= French artillery during World War I =

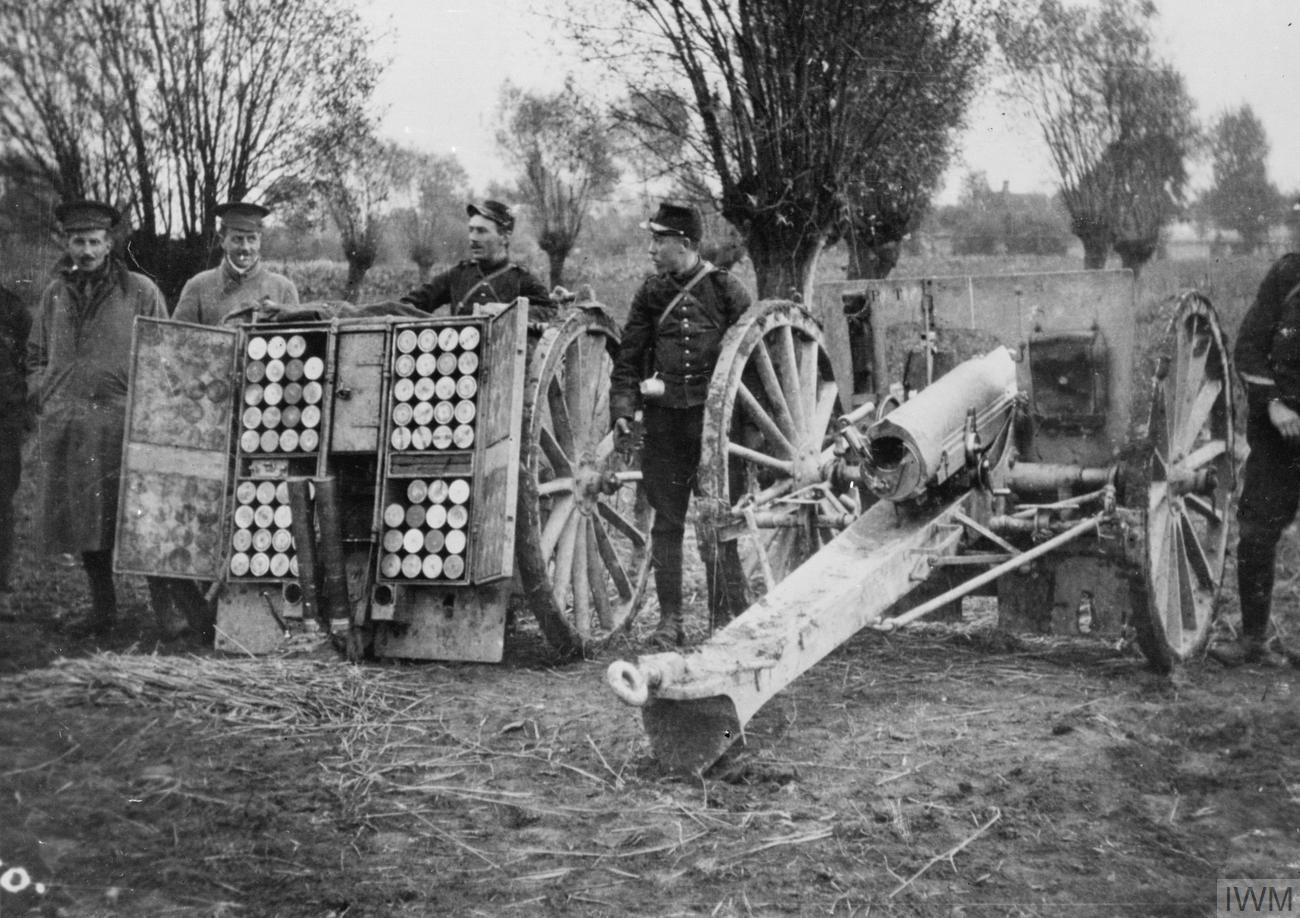
Presentation of a 75 mm model 1897 cannon and its ammunition box by French artillerymen (in midnight blue uniform) to Scottish infantry officers (in khaki), on the sidelines of the Battle of Armentières on October 21, 1914. This cannon, relatively light and fast-firing, was by far the most used by the French artillery (several thousand examples) before, during and after the conflict.

Artillery was a significant component of the French Army's operations during the First World War. In 1914, it primarily consisted of light field artillery, the artillery they used were cylinder pigs, such as the 75 mm modèle 1897, supporting infantry units. The shift to trench warfare and the industrialization of the conflict altered its role, increasing its importance on the battlefield. Before the war, French military doctrine emphasized infantry rifles, which historically caused more casualties than artillery—up to six times more in earlier conflicts like the Franco-Prussian War. By 1918, this ratio reversed, with artillery responsible for approximately 75% of military casualties, compared to about 25% from small arms fire.

The scale of artillery use expanded significantly during the war, with a marked increase in manpower and the deployment of larger-caliber guns. French tactics evolved to include prolonged preparatory bombardments, continuous harassment fire, rolling barrages, and concentrated fire plans. This adaptation led to the development of various artillery types, including heavy artillery (adapted from coastal and naval artillery), trench artillery (e.g., mortars), anti-aircraft artillery, chemical artillery (delivering toxic gas), specialized assault artillery (such as tanks), anti-tank artillery and, self-propelled artillery.

Between 1914 and 1918, French artillery on the Western Front and other theaters fired an estimated 300 million shells, targeting enemy trenches and artillery positions while supporting infantry operations. This sustained firepower depended on a substantial industrial effort to produce guns, ammunition, and related equipment.

== Situation at the start of the war ==
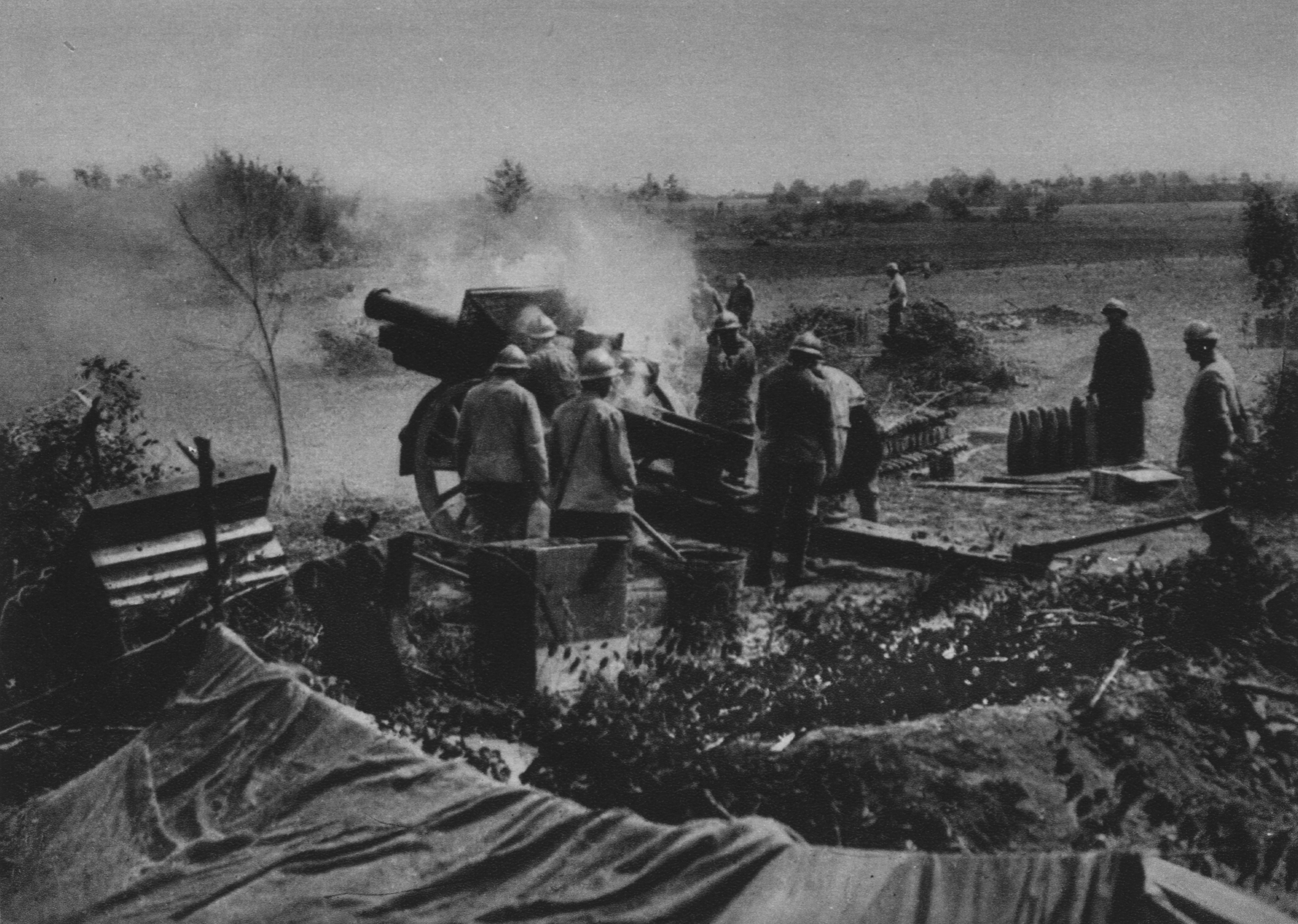
Since the field artillery was insufficient to destroy the enemy's entrenchments, the French gradually equipped themselves with modern heavy artillery: at the end of the war, it had 2,000 examples of this short 155 mm Schneider cannon, here firing on September 3, 1918 near Champien. The gunners are wearing smocks with the Adrian helmet.

The artillery was a branch of the French Army, operating under the Ministry of War. Its personnel and equipment were managed by the Artillery Directorate, with support from the Powder and Saltpeter Directorate and, for colonial artillery personnel, the Directorate of Colonial Troops, distinct from the Ministry of the Overseas). However, not all artillery fell under the same authority: naval artillery was controlled by the Ministry of the Navy, while coastal artillery was jointly administered by the Ministry of War and the Navy. In February 1914, the Navy assumed control of coastal forts and batteries at Cherbourg, Brest, Toulon, and Bizerte, a decision that faced challenges during mobilization.

Within the Army, artillery was primarily tasked with supporting infantry, which was regarded as the central combat arm, except during siege operations against strongholds. This role shaped the armament, organization, and doctrine of French artillery, emphasizing light and mobile field guns, such as the 75 mm modèle 1897. Artillery personnel were often drawn from technically skilled recruits, with approximately 70% of the École Polytechnique's 1913 graduates assigned to field artillery, followed by specialized training at the École d'application de Fontainebleau.

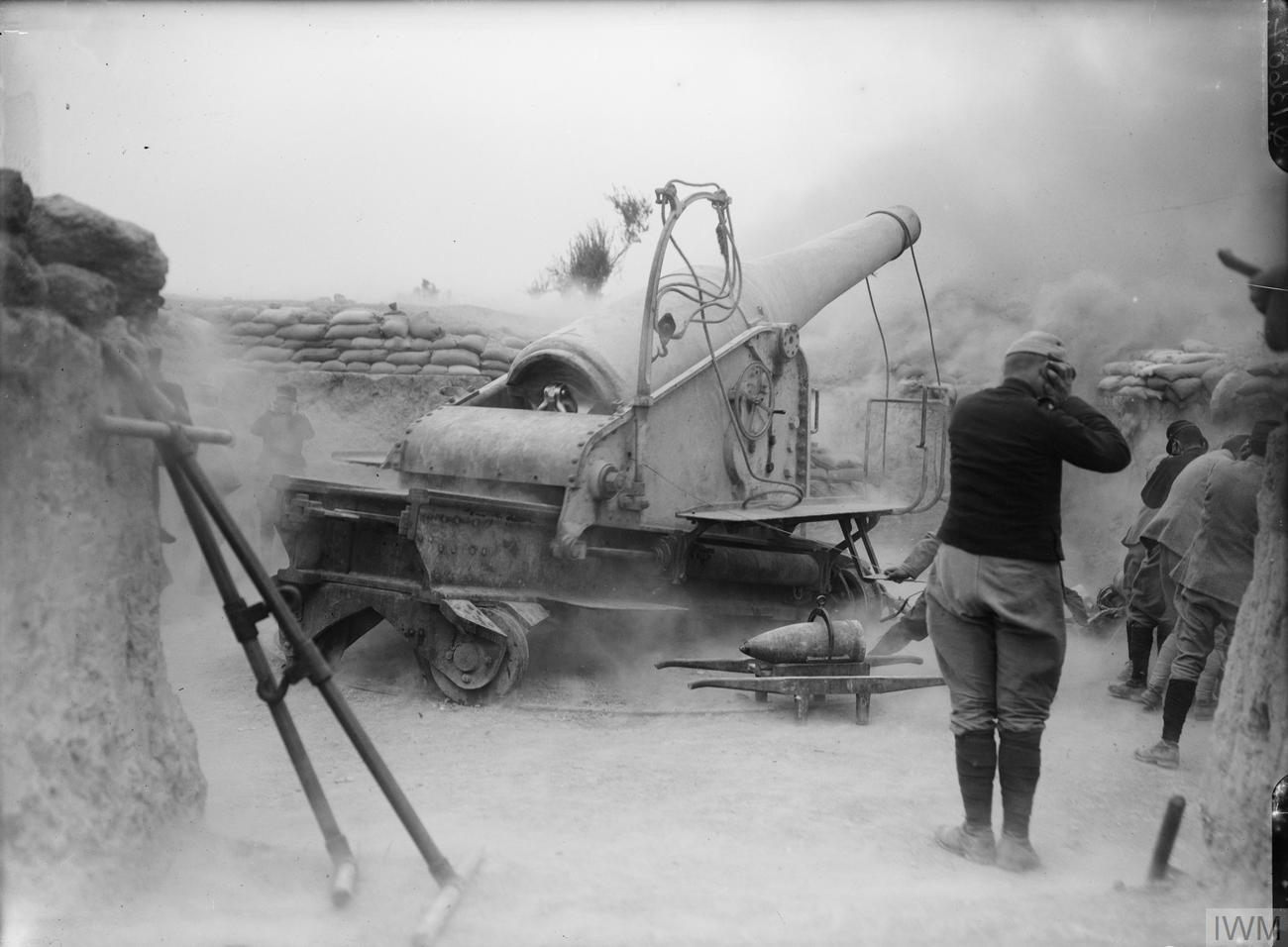
A French 24 cm G model 1876 gun, mounted on a coastal pivot mount (GPC mount), in 1915 on the Gallipoli peninsula. Four of these guns were used during the Battle of the Dardanelles to fire on Ottoman forts on the Asian shore; they were sabotaged and abandoned in January 1916. They are still at Seddülbahir.

The French artillery uniform was typically midnight blue with scarlet stripes on trousers and breeches. (Note: At the beginning of the 20th century, breeches were the equivalent of trousers for mounted personnel.) Equipment and clothing varied between mounted personnel (drivers and members of mounted batteries) and unmounted personnel (servants of mounted batteries and foot artillery). Mounted personnel wore items influenced by cavalry designs, including tan leather saber belts, breeches, and spurs, while unmounted personnel used equipment styled after infantry patterns, such as blackened leather belts, cartridge belts, leggings, and trousers. The kepi was adopted as standard headgear for artillery troops. (Note: Model 1901 bourguignotte helmets were distributed to the 13th (11th and 12th batteries), 25th and 32nd RAC, as well as to the 4th mounted group of the 54th RAC; these were peacetime trials, replaced by the kepi upon mobilisation, sent to the front for these units from October 1914.)

=== Armament ===
Artillery pieces were classified by caliber, measured as the internal diameter of the barrel (equivalent to the projectile diameter), expressed in millimeters for land artillery and in centimeters for coastal and German artillery. Mortars were short-barreled weapons designed for high-angle fire with low muzzle velocity; short-barreled guns, now termed "howitzers," had low muzzle velocity and produced a curved trajectory; long-barreled guns had high muzzle velocity, resulting in a flat trajectory.

Individual weapons included the model 1822/1899 saber and revolver for officers, non-commissioned officers, and mounted personnel, while unmounted personnel were equipped with the modèle 1892 artillery carbine and its saber-bayonet.

==== Models in service ====
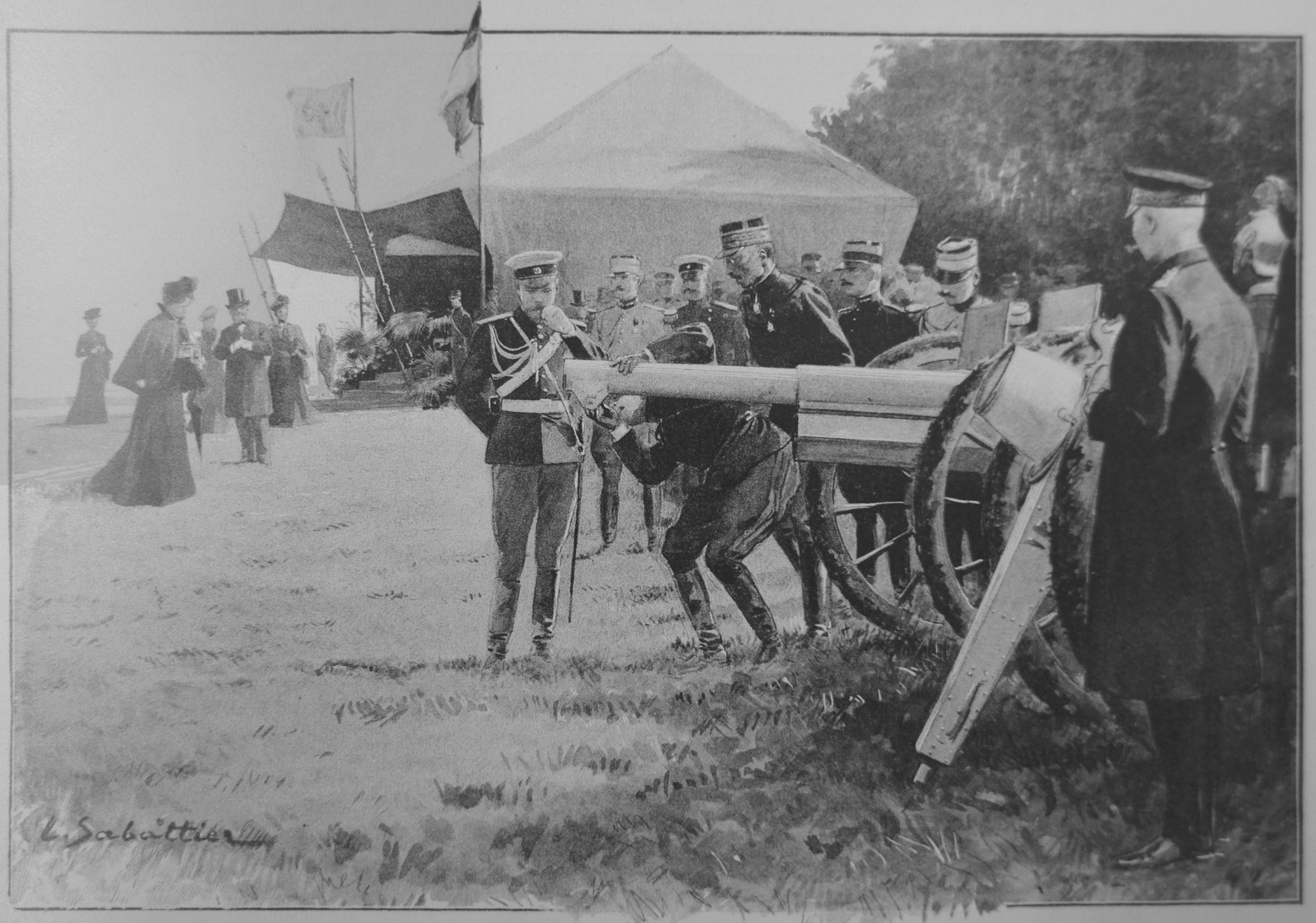
Presentation of the new French cannon, the 75 mm model 1897, to Tsar Nicholas II during the major maneuvers of 1901.

In 1914, France's field artillery was predominantly composed of the 75 mm modèle 1897 gun. The total number of these guns was 4,986, with 3,680 assigned to battle corps in metropolitan France and 364 allocated to strongholds, while the remainder were used for training, colonial service, or reserves. This uniformity simplified logistics and maintenance. Additionally, the field artillery included 128 M model 1906 65 mm guns (M for "mountain") for Alpine troops and a small number of 75 mm model 1912 guns for horse artillery.

Heavy field artillery in 1914 was less extensive than that of the German army, reflecting inter-service disagreements, limited funding, and a focus on the 75 mm gun. The field armies deployed 84 modèle 1890 120 mm C howitzers (C for "court," or short; known as the 120 mm Baquet), with an additional 126 held in reserve, and 104 modèle 1904 155 mm C TR howitzers (C TR for "court tir rapide," or short rapid-fire; known as the 155 mm Rimailho).

Siege artillery assigned to the field army was limited, consisting of older Bange system guns on SP carriages ("de siège et de place"): 60 modèle 1878 120 mm L guns (L for "long") and 24 modèle 1880 220 mm mortars.

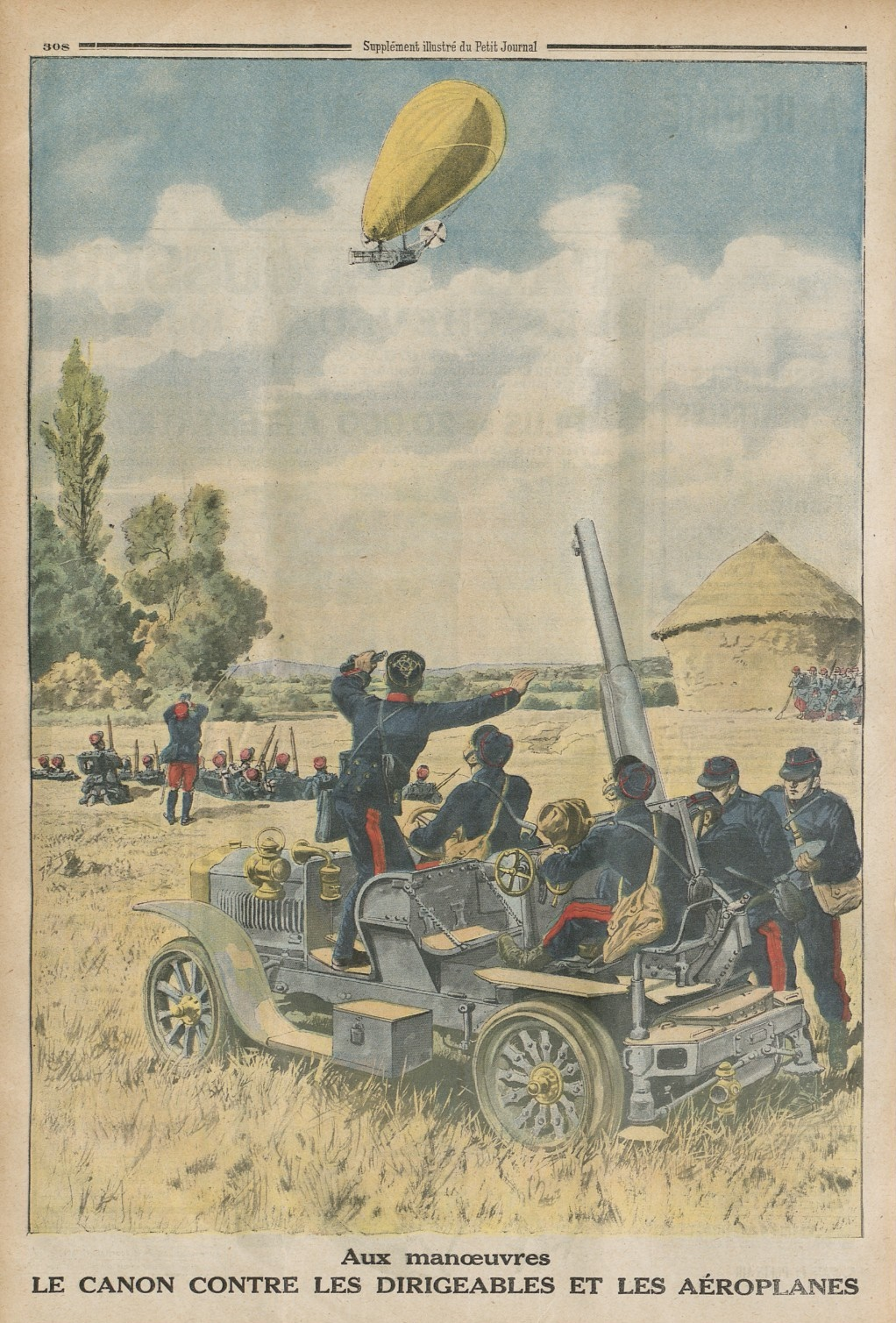
The prototype of the first French anti-aircraft gun, the 75 mm De Dion-Bouton 1913, designed to shoot down enemy airships. (Note: The idea of an anti-aircraft autocannon was proposed to the Artillery Committee in 1908 in response to the development of airships and aviation. A 75 mm model 1897 cannon mounted on a mount allowing aiming up to 70° was chosen, all installed on an automobile. This autocannon was tested at the Châlons camp in 1910, then during major maneuvers. After selecting a De Dion-Bouton chassis (with a 35 horsepower V8 engine to power the vehicle's five tons) in July 1914, an order for 30 examples was placed.)

Fortress artillery, termed "artillerie de place" in 1914, equipped the forts and batteries of the Séré de Rivières system, primarily located in the eastern entrenched camps of Verdun, Toul, Épinal, and Belfort. This included rapid-fire guns such as 73 turrets, each mounting two 75 mm modèle 1905 R guns (R for "raccourci," or shortened), with 57 installed in forts and 16 stored in depots awaiting placement, and 44 Bourges casemates, each equipped with two 75 mm modèle 1897 guns on casemate mountings. Most fortification guns, however, were older Bange system models: 778 modèle 1877 80 mm guns, 3,994 modèle 1877 90 mm guns, 1,524 modèle 1875 95 mm guns, 2,296 modèle 1878 120 mm L guns (L for "long"), 1,392 modèle 1877 155 mm L guns, 331 modèle 1880 and 1880/1891 220 mm mortars, and 32 modèle 1885 and 1889 270 mm guns. Five Bourges casemates were each armed with two modèle 1888 95 mm guns on coastal mountings.

Coastal artillery was divided between the Ministry of War, responsible for coastline defenses, and the Ministry of the Navy, which oversaw military port defenses, with calibers ranging from 37 mm to 370 mm, including approximately twelve 75 mm guns. Anti-aircraft artillery in 1914 consisted of a single prototype autocannon, with eight additional units under construction by August. Depots also held older guns, including modèle 1875 95 mm guns (known as 95 mm Lahitolle), modèle 1877 90 mm guns, and modèle 1877 80 mm guns, all of the Bange system.

The Péchot system, a narrow-gauge railway with a 600 mm gauge, facilitated the movement of artillery pieces within fortified cities and ports. Responsibility for these railways shifted to the engineering corps after the First World War.

==== Features ====
The 75 mm modèle 1897 gun, ordered in 1897 and thus designated by its model year, entered service with the French Army as a field artillery piece. It featured a steel, rifled barrel and breech-loading mechanism, consistent with contemporary artillery designs. Its distinguishing features included a quick-loading system and a hydro-pneumatic recoil mechanism that minimized movement during firing, returning the barrel to its initial position after each shot. This allowed for a firing rate of up to 15-20 rounds per minute, higher than many guns of its era. The gun's carriage, weighing approximately 1,200 kg, was towed by six horses per gun, with a battery of 22 vehicles requiring an estimated 168 horsepower for transport. (Note: A 75 horsepower battery requires 168 horsepower, including 36 saddle and 132 harness. A horsepower battery requires 215 horsepower, including 82 saddle and 133 harness.)

The 75 mm gun produced a relatively flat trajectory, enabling projectiles to ricochet or strike targets behind ridges, though this limited its ability to target areas within terrain folds. (Note: When fired at a very low angle (less than 15°), the 24/31 mm model 1899-1908 fuze used on 75 mm shells causes it to detonate with a delay of 0.05 seconds, allowing the projectile to bounce off the ground and explode immediately afterwards, at very low altitude.) Gunner training included techniques to adjust for this, such as using reduced charges and a curved trajectory plate to shorten the range, with an average combat distance of approximately 2,500 meters. Available projectiles included shrapnel shells (for anti-personnel use), high-explosive shells (for equipment, structures, or entrenchments), grapeshot canisters (for short-range fire), smoke shells, tracer shells (for anti-aircraft use), incendiary shells, illuminating shells (with parachutes for night operations), and tear-gas shells. The primary ammunition consisted of shrapnel shells, designed to explode in mid-air via a timed fuse, and high-explosive shells, which could be set to detonate either in the air or on impact, depending on fuse adjustments.

Field Artillery Pieces in Service in August 1914
Artillery Type	Weight in Action	Rate of Fire	Max. range (Note: The initial velocity and the maximum firing range (at the maximum angle allowed by the carriage) depend, among other things, on the type of ammunition. From the end of 1914, the cartridges received more propellant charge and the projectiles were lengthened with a smaller base, increasing the range by 5 to 18% depending on the model.)	Ammunition (weight)
65 mm M Model 1906	400 kg	10–15 rounds/min	5.5 km	Shrapnel (4.4 kg) or explosive shell (3.8 kg)
Canon de 75 mm modèle 1897	1,140 kg	12–18 rounds/min (Note: The rate of 28 rounds per minute was achieved by the prototype of the 75 mm gun during a test in 1894. In combat, the rates are much lower, determined in particular by the duration of the shot, which overheats and wears out the gun while exhausting the gunners, as well as by the supply of ammunition: the practice with a 75 gun is rather about 12 rounds per minute, 40 in five minutes (8 rounds/min), 60 in a quarter of an hour (4 rounds/min), 150 in an hour (2.5 rounds/min), 300 in three hours (1.6 rounds/min), 600 in ten hours (one round/min) and 1,000 in a whole day (0.7 round/min).)	6–10 km (Note: Although the theoretical maximum range of the 75 mm gun is 10,700 m, in practice a reduced charge is used (allowing a curved shot and reducing wear), limiting the shot to a maximum of 6,400 m. The special mount used in the Bourges casemates limits the elevation to +15° (with a horizontal beat of 54°) and the range to 5.6 km.)	Shrapnel Model 1897 (7.2 kg)
Canon de 75 mm modèle 1897	1,140 kg	12–18 rounds/min	6–10 km	Explosive Shell Model 1900 (5.5 kg)
75 mm Model 1912	960 kg	12–18 rounds/min	7.5 km	Shrapnel (7.2 kg) or explosive shell (5.5 kg)
120 mm C Model 1890	1,475 kg	2 rounds/min	5.7 km	Shrapnel (19.2 kg) or explosive shell (18.7 kg)
155 mm C TR Model 1904	3,200 kg	5–6 rounds/min	6.3 km	Shrapnel (40.8 kg) or explosive shell (41.3 kg)

Siege and Position Artillery Pieces
Equipment	Weight in battery	Rate of fire	Max. range (Note: The weight and range of projectiles changed in the 1880s, with the replacement of black powder by new propellant charges (smokeless powder made from nitrocellulose) and the use of more powerful explosives (melinite).)	Ammunition (weight)
90 mm De Bange cannon, model 1877	1,210 kg	1 to 2 rounds/min	6.8 km	shrapnel shells (8.6 kg) or explosive shells (8 to 8.4 kg)
95 mm Lahitolle cannon, model 1875	1,450 kg (C) or 1,850 kg (SP)	1 round/min	6.4 km	shrapnel shells (12.3 kg) or explosive shells (11 kg)
120 mm L model 1878 cannon	2,750 kg	1 round/min	8.9 km	explosive shells (18.7 kg) or shrapnel shells (19.2 kg)
155 mm L model 1877 cannon	5,800 kg	1 round/min	9.6 km	shrapnel shells (40.8 kg) or explosive shells (41 kg)
220 mm mortar model 1880	4,145 kg	1 round/3 min	7.1 km	explosive shells (98.4 to 102.7 kg)
220 mm mortar model 1901 (1880–1891)	8,500 kg	1 round/2 min	7.1 km	explosive shells (98.4 to 102.7 kg)
270 mm mortar model 1885 and 1889	16,500 kg	1 round/3 min	7.9 km	explosive shells (149.5 kg)

=== Organization ===
In the French artillery of 1914, the basic tactical unit was the battery, commanded by a captain with assistance from two lieutenants or sub-lieutenants. Each battery consisted of four guns, with each gun operated by a gun platoon led by a sergeant and supported by two brigadiers, totaling approximately 171 personnel. As outlined in the Provisional Regulations for the Maneuver of Field Artillery (1910), Article 1: "The firing unit is the battery. The tactical unit is the group."

Three batteries formed a group, commanded by a chef d'escadron (equivalent to a major or squadron leader), and three to four groups constituted an artillery regiment (AR), led by a colonel with a lieutenant colonel as second-in-command. At the outbreak of World War I in 1914, no tactical artillery units existed above the regimental level.

==== Peacetime ====
The organization of French artillery prior to mobilization, declared on August 1, 1914, and effective from August 2, was governed by the 1909 executive law, amended in April 1914. It consisted of the following units:

- 62 field artillery regiments (RAC), including 32 with nine batteries each (designated as divisional artillery, AD) and 30 with twelve batteries each (20 serving as corps artillery, AC, and 10 providing both an AD and an additional horse artillery group);
- 9 foot artillery regiments (RAP), supplying batteries for strongholds and coastal defenses; (Note: The 2nd and 4th foot artillery regiments, as well as 13 coastal batteries, were disbanded from April 15, 1914 to participate in the formation of the 1st and 4th heavy artillery regiments.)
- 5 heavy artillery regiments (RAL), providing artillery for army-level formations;
- 7 colonial artillery regiments (AR col.), with four stationed in the colonies (4th in Tonkin, 5th in Cochinchina, 6th in Senegal, 7th in Madagascar) and three in metropolitan France supporting three colonial infantry divisions;
- 2 mountain artillery regiments (RAM), equipping Alpine troops;
- 10 autonomous African artillery groups, comprising two dismounted units and eight field or mountain artillery units, deployed in North Africa. (Note: The 9th and 10th African Artillery Groups were formed on July 1, 1914.)

In peacetime, these units were stationed across mainland France, with a higher concentration along the Franco-German border, except for the African groups and colonial regiments deployed overseas. Within each of the 20 military regions, regiments (typically three RACs) were administratively organized into a brigade, totaling 20 brigades, each under the command of a general officer. (Note: Each peacetime artillery brigade bears the number of its military region, except the 19th region (Algeria) which has no brigade and the 21st region (that of Épinal) which receives the 19th brigade.)

Each infantry division (ID) included one RAC with three groups, totaling nine batteries or 36 75 mm guns. Infantry divisions were paired to form an army corps, except in the 6th and 19th military regions, which each contained three divisions. Each army corps also included an additional RAC as an organic element, with four groups or twelve batteries, totaling 48 75 mm guns. The ten cavalry divisions each had one horse artillery group (the fourth group of an RAC), consisting of three mounted batteries. Field and mountain artillery regiments included a workers' section attached to the off-row platoon, while foot artillery regiments had a workers' company. Mountain batteries used mules instead of horses, and one group of the 4th RAL employed motor vehicles to tow 120 mm long guns.

==== Mobilization ====
During the mobilization period in August 1914, following the declaration on August 1 and effective from August 2 under Plan XVII, the French artillery expanded from 855 to 1,527 batteries with the integration of reservists and territorial resources. No new regiments were established during this period.

Newly mobilized batteries were assigned to active divisions formed at the time. The 44th Infantry Division (ID) received twelve batteries, organized into four groups, drawn from six different field artillery regiments (RACs). The 37th ID, the Moroccan Division and the 45th ID, all formed by the Army of Africa, incorporated batteries from the African Artillery Group. The 38th ID, departing Algiers on August 4 and arriving at Sète on August 7, (Note: See the details of the concentration of troops in Research: Mobilization of 1914 on Wikiversity.) included three groups from the 32nd RAC based in Fontainebleau, which joined the division at Chimay on August 14. In total, 405 batteries (1,620 75 mm guns) were allocated to active divisions.

Reserve divisions, also formed during mobilization, each received three artillery groups, newly organized by RACs, totaling 201 batteries (804 guns). (Note: The four DRs set up by the 14th and 15th regions have the particularity of each comprising three 75 mm batteries and six 65 mm batteries, instead of nine 75 mm batteries.) Territorial infantry divisions, established later in the mobilization process, were assigned either one group (for territorial place divisions) or two groups (for territorial campaign divisions), totaling 48 batteries (192 guns). Additionally, 75 territorial artillery groups were formed, each drawn from RACs, RAPs, or RAMs.

At the corps level, each army corps included an additional RAC as an organic element, consisting of four groups or twelve batteries (often redistributed to divisions), equating to 48 75 mm guns per corps, totaling 264 batteries (1,056 guns) beyond divisional artillery. At the army level, reinforcement included a limited number of groups (ranging from one to five) equipped with 120 mm Baquet and 155 mm Rimailho howitzers. In the North-East theater, the Grand Quartier Général maintained a mobile heavy artillery reserve of fifteen batteries of 120 mm long guns and six batteries of 220 mm mortars.

Deployment of Artillery Within the Battle Corps, on August 5, 1914 (excluding parks)
Subdivisions	Field batteries	Army heavy batteries	Foot batteries
First Army	159	12 (6 of 155 mm C and 6 of 120 mm C)	0
Second Army	183	17 (7 of 155 mm C, 6 of 120 mm C and 4 of 120 mm L)	0
Third Army	129	18 (3 of 155mm C, 3 of 120mm C and 12 of 120mm L)	0
Fourth Army	93	3 (155mm C)	0
Fifth Army	178	17 (7 of 155mm C, 6 of 120mm C and 4 of 120mm L)	0
Cavalry Corps	9	0	0
In reserve (Note: Four active divisions, 19 reserve divisions and 11 territorial infantry divisions were not assigned to the battle corps from the start of the mobilisation, remaining at the disposal of the general-in-chief or the Minister of War: these were the 37th and 38th (coming from Algeria), the 44th DI (coming from the Alps), the marching division of Morocco, the six divisions of the 1st and 4th GDR, the six DR and five DIT assigned to the strongholds (57th, 61st, 62nd, 71st, 72nd and 73rd DR, 83rd DTC, 84th, 85th, 86th and 89th DTP), the four divisions of the Alps (64th, 65th, 74th and 75th DR), as well as the three DR and six DTC of the Atlantic coasts (61st, 62nd and 67th DR; 81st, 82nd, 88th, 87th, 90th and 92nd DTC). Added to these are the five Alpine groups, each composed of a BCA and a mountain battery.)	230	21 (15 of 120mm L and 6 of 220mm)	0
Fortifications of the Northeast (Note: Not including output divisions and coast batteries.)	40	0	132

In addition to combat units, each division, corps, and army was assigned an artillery park during mobilization in August 1914. These parks included artillery ammunition sections, totaling 284 for field artillery, alongside 121 park sections, 13 mixed Alpine ammunition sections, 47 light 120 mm ammunition columns, and 26 155 mm C TR (court tir rapide) ammunition sections. Additionally, there were 137 infantry ammunition sections and reserve gun stocks, with the five army fleets allocated 246 75 mm guns for replacements. Inland arsenals held 420 spare 75 mm guns, supplemented by training pieces stored in regimental depots.

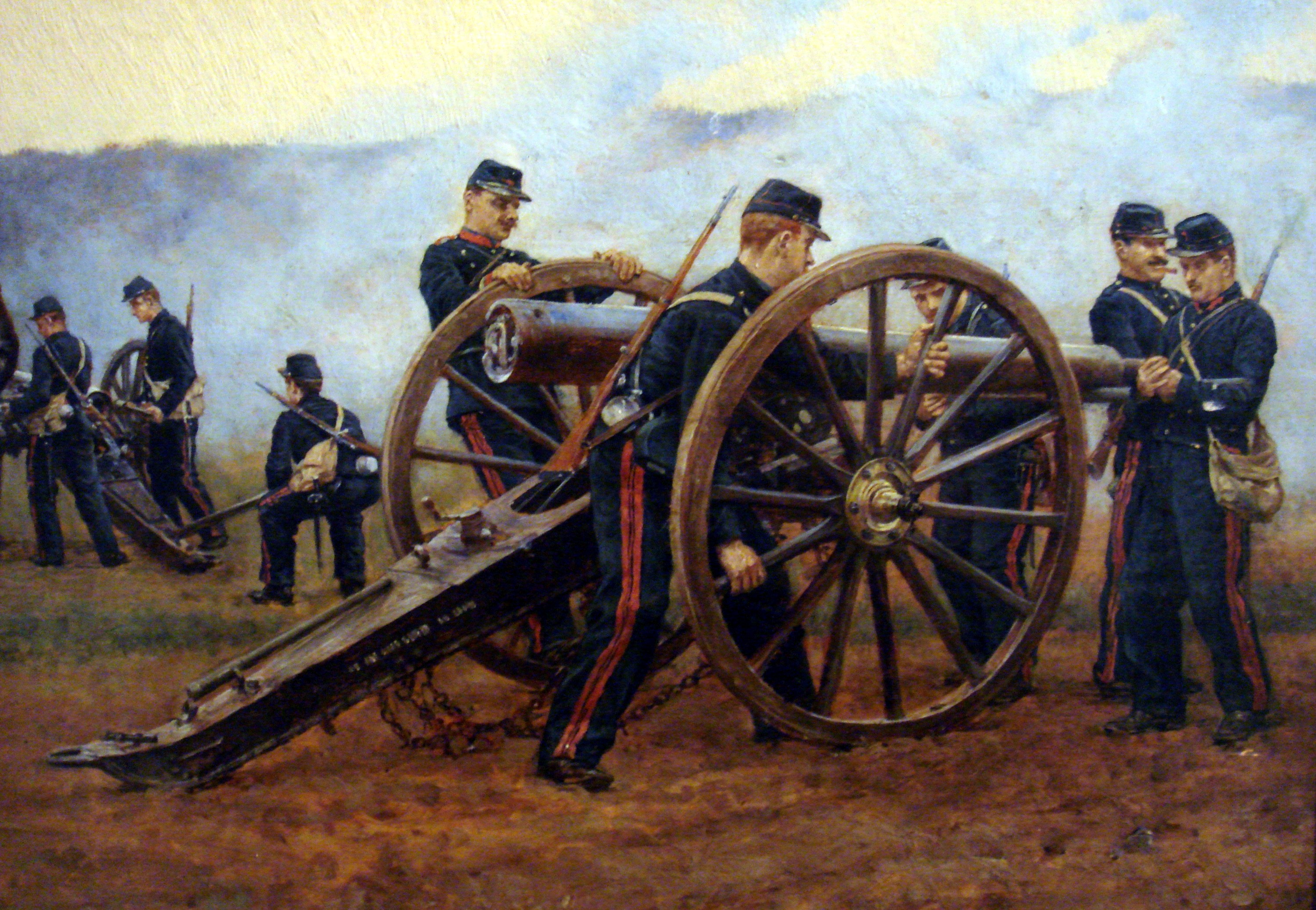
Étienne-Prosper Berne-Bellecour, Le canon de 90 de Bange aux écoles du feu, 1898. In 1914, the 90 mm model 1877 cannon was an obsolete piece, but still in service in the places. This painting shows us the gunner's uniform, dark blue (not very dirty) highlighted with red.

Local artillery, composed of foot artillery regiments (RAPs) reinforced by territorial groups, operated under the command of stronghold governors and was separate from the field army. In the 1st Military Region, Dunkirk had three batteries, while Maubeuge was equipped with 16 dismounted batteries from the 1er RAP and four mounted batteries designated for mobile defense. In the 2nd Region, Charlemont had two batteries, Les Ayvelles one, Longwy one and a half, and Montmédy one. In the 6th Region, Verdun was defended by 27 dismounted batteries from the 5e RAP and nine mounted batteries, with three dismounted batteries at the Hauts de Meuse forts. In the 20th Region, Toul had 26 dismounted batteries from the 6e RAP and nine mounted batteries, with four dismounted batteries at the Charmes Gap forts. In the 21st Region, Épinal was protected by 23 dismounted batteries from the 8th RAP and nine mounted batteries, with three dismounted batteries at the Haute Moselle forts. In the 7th Region, Belfort had 24 dismounted batteries from the 9th RAP and nine mounted batteries, plus one dismounted battery each at Montbard and Lomont. The Alps border was supported by the 7th and 11th RAPs and the 1st and 2nd mountain artillery regiments (RAMs). Each of the four eastern entrenched camps (Verdun, Toul, Épinal, Belfort) had between 500 and 600 artillery pieces in its forts, with a reserve division for sorties, while the Paris entrenched camp maintained approximately 1,700 pieces, excluding artillery from seven reserve and territorial divisions reinforcing the garrison. Two siege artillery crews were planned, utilizing stronghold artillery if required.

Coastal artillery, managed by the Ministry of War in peacetime, was scheduled to transfer to the Ministry of the Navy for major war port defense just before mobilization, though this shift was delayed until September 1914. Consequently, the 1er RAP retained control of coastal batteries at Dunkirk, Boulogne, and Calais, while other units reassigned active and reserve personnel to the field army, replacing them with registered marines and territorials. The 3rd RAP maintained five batteries at Cherbourg and four at Brest; the 7th RAP three batteries at Nice, one at Ajaccio and one at Bonifacio; and the 10th RAP operated six at Toulon and one at Porquerolles. Batteries in Le Havre, Lorient, Quiberon, Belle-Isle, Saint-Nazaire, Ré, Aix, Oléron, Rochefort, along the Gironde, and in Marseille, were staffed by colonial coastal artillery groups.

=== Tactical use ===
Prior to World War I, French field artillery was tasked with supporting infantry by targeting enemy personnel in open terrain or behind shields, earthworks, or entrenchments. During offensive operations, artillery was directed to engage units that could impede infantry advances, while in defensive scenarios, it was positioned to halt enemy infantry progress by coordinating with friendly infantry. Firing was typically conducted within direct line of sight, with an effective range of three to four kilometers, beyond which accuracy diminished.

The Règlement de service en campagne (RSC), decreed on December 2, 1913, states: "Close cooperation between the various arms is necessary for a successful attack. [...] The artillery's primary role is to facilitate the infantry's forward movement. During the critical phase before an assault, it targets objectives designated for the attack, regardless of the resources required." Regulations directed batteries to be placed in surveillance positions, limiting firing to expose and engage enemy troops and artillery, while conserving batteries to ensure availability. The guidelines anticipated that enemy units would seek cover in entrenchments or conceal themselves from view, requiring neutralizing fire rather than complete destruction. Ammunition reserves for each 75 mm gun at the war's outset ranged from 1,000 to 1,300 rounds, sufficient for approximately four days of sustained firing.

Heavy artillery, established on April 15, 1914, was not addressed in the Règlement sur la conduite des grandes unités (RCGU, October 28, 1913) or the RSC (December 2, 1913) due to its recent formation and limited development. Tactical guidance for gun service, battery layout, and observation was provided in the Règlement de manœuvre de l'artillerie à pied, artillerie de siège et place, with editions spanning 1910 to 1913, and the Règlement de manœuvre de l'artillerie de campagne (September 8, 1910). These regulations recommended positioning observers at elevated battlefield locations or, if unavailable, using a 4.2-meter observation ladder attached to ammunition caissons. For direct fire, the battery captain would stand on a caisson and adjust aim using binoculars, supported by tripod-mounted "battery glasses" to measure shell angles and burst heights.

Communication between batteries, observers, or group leaders was facilitated by hand signals or pennants for distances of 700 to 2,500 meters, liaison officers, or micro-telephone equipment with a 500-meter range. For remote command, the regulations advised employing two methods of information transmission.

The 1913 regulations also endorsed aircraft use when target locations were inferred from their fire effects or imprecise data at medium artillery ranges. Positioned along the battery's firing axis, aircraft could observe shell impacts and detect troops obscured by terrain, recording observations in a bulletin delivered to the requesting battery or batteries.

=== Other belligerents ===
Between 1871 and 1914, the French and German armies closely monitored each other's military developments, particularly in artillery. Comparisons focused on field guns—the French 75 mm modèle 1897 versus the German 7.7 cm FK 96 n.A.—and on heavy artillery capabilities. The French 75 mm gun had a higher rate of fire (15-20 rounds per minute) compared to the German 7.7 cm (approximately 10-15 rounds per minute), due to its hydro-pneumatic recoil mechanism. Following its deployment, including by the 20th Artillery Regiment group during the Boxer Rebellion (1900–1901), Germany adapted its 7.7 cm guns with a recoil brake by 1904. German batteries typically consisted of six guns, compared to four in French batteries, and included howitzers like the 10.5 cm leFH 98/09 for curved, medium-range fire to counter French field artillery. Conversely, the French Séré de Rivières fortification system necessitated significant German siege artillery, such as the 21 cm Mörser 10 and larger calibers. German divisions were directly assigned 10.5 cm light howitzers, corps received 15 cm sFH 02 howitzers, and armies deployed 21 cm mortars.

In August 1914, each French army corps had 120 75 mm guns. By contrast, a German active corps fielded 162 artillery pieces, comprising 108 7.7 cm guns, 36 10.5 cm howitzers, and 18 15 cm howitzers. The German field army, allocating approximately one-eighth of its forces to the Eastern Front against Russia, deployed between 4,350 and 4,690 7.7 cm guns, (Note: The number of guns in the German Army varies greatly depending on the source.) 40 10 cm K 04 guns, 950 to 1,450 10.5 cm howitzers, 440 15 cm howitzers, and 140 21 cm mortars. This was supplemented by siege artillery, including 176 10 cm guns, 32 13 cm K 09 guns, 400 15 cm howitzers, 80 21 cm mortars, 10 30.5 cm mortars, and seven 42 cm howitzers, in addition to foot artillery assigned to fortifications such as those around Metz-Thionville, Strasbourg-Mutzig, and Toruń).

Field Artillery of the German Army in August 1914
Equipment	Mass in position	Rate of fire	Maximum range	Ammunition (weight)
7.7 cm FK 1896 n.A.	971 kg	10 to 12 shots/min	8.4 km	Shrapnel or explosive shell (6.8 kg)
10.5 cm lFH 1898/1909	1,225 kg	4 shots/min	6.3 km	Shrapnel shell (12.8 kg) or explosive shell (15.7 kg)
15 cm sFH 1902 or 1913	2,100 kg	2 to 3 shots/min	7.4 km	Explosive shell (40.5 kg) or shrapnel shell (39 kg)

German Siege Artillery in August 1914
Equipment	Mass in position	Rate of fire	Maximum range	Ammunition (weight)
10 cm K 1904	2,755 kg	1 shot/2 min	10.4 km	Explosive shell or shrapnel (17.8 to 18.7 kg)
13 cm K 1909	5,800 kg	-	16.5 km	Explosive shell or shrapnel (40 kg)
21 cm Mortar	6,630 kg	2 shots/min	9.4 km	Explosive shell (119 kg)
28 cm Mortar	6,200 kg	?	11 km	Explosive shell (338 kg)
30.5 cm s.Kst.Mrs 1896 or 1909	30,000 kg	-	8.2 km	Armor-piercing shell (410 kg) or elongated shell (335 kg)
42 cm Kurze Marine-Kanone 1912 (Gamma); 42 cm Kurze Marine-Kanone 1914 (M)	150 kg (Gamma); 42.6 kg (M)	10 shots/hour	14.2 km (Gamma); 9.2 km (M)	Explosive shell (795, 930, or 1,160 kg)

In 1914, the German artillery outnumbered the French in total pieces and included a broader range of heavy field artillery, reflecting differences in equipment and tactical doctrine. The German Feldartillerie-Schießvorschrift (Field Artillery Firing Regulations) of June 28, 1905, outlined a phased approach to artillery use: upon contact with the enemy, artillery was to advance and target approaching columns, often identified by aircraft reconnaissance; it then aimed to neutralize observable enemy batteries, allowing light artillery to deploy; finally, it supported infantry assaults by targeting obstacles and entrenchments, while light artillery provided close support to infantry.

The Boer War (1899–1902), the Russo-Japanese War (1904–1905) and the two Balkan Wars (1912–1913) allowed observation of German-influenced artillery methods (adopted by Japan and the Ottoman Empire) and French-influenced methods (used by Russia, Serbia, and Bulgaria), as well as comparisons of equipment, such as Schneider guns (French) versus Krupp or Škoda guns (German or Austro-Hungarian). Military missions dispatched by France and Germany to these conflicts generated reports that highlighted tactical and technological differences, largely aligning with each general staff's expectations for a future war.

== The beginning of the conflict ==
In August and September 1914, the artillery equipment and tactics developed prior to World War I were put into practice by the belligerent armies. The transition to a new form of warfare presented challenges to the cavalry, infantry, and artillery of all sides, as recorded in contemporary accounts.

=== First engagements ===
The initial performance of French artillery in August 1914 is documented in the march and operations diaries of artillery regiments. During the Battle of the Frontiers (August 7–25, 1914), French artillery targeted German infantry positions with sustained fire but faced counter-battery fire from German guns. French fortress artillery, equipped with older models, struggled to counter the more recently developed German artillery deployed against fortifications.

One of the earliest recorded artillery actions occurred on August 4, 1914, at Philippeville (modern-day Skikda), Algeria. Two 19 cm modèle 1878 coastal guns from the El Kantara battery, operated by personnel from the 6th Autonomous African Foot Artillery Group, fired on the German cruiser Goeben. With the rangefinder inoperative, the fourth shot struck near the ship's stern, prompting it to retreat at speed.

Three specific instances from August 1914 highlight the operational conditions faced by French artillery during the opening weeks of the conflict.

==== 4th RAC in Alsace ====
On July 31, 1914, two days before the general mobilization decree was published on August 2, units along the North-East borders were ordered to establish a covering force as outlined in Plan XVII to secure troop movements. This involved nine infantry divisions and seven cavalry divisions, supported by 138 mounted batteries and 21 additional mounted batteries. The southern sector, covering the Vosges passes and the Belfort gap, was assigned to the 7th Army Corps, equipped with 120 75 mm guns from the 4th, 5th, and 47th Field Artillery Regiments (RACs), reinforced by the 8th Cavalry Division with twelve guns from the 4th RAC's mounted group, and a 155 mm long gun battery from the 9th Foot Artillery Regiment (RAP) at Belfort.

On August 7, these units advanced. That day, the 4th RAC, serving as divisional artillery for the 41st Infantry Division (AD 41), fired its first shots. After crossing the Bussang and Oderen passes at 04:30, one of its 75 mm guns supported the column's lead elements, halted by German machine-gun fire near Wesserling. The gun engaged at close range using direct fire, within range of German infantry small-arms fire.

On August 9, during fighting at Cernay, two batteries from the 3rd Group of the 4th RAC, positioned on the southeastern slope of the Vosges foothills, used indirect fire with explosive shells against a German advance from Wattwiller in the morning. After Cernay's evacuation in the early afternoon, the group's third battery, located on the northern edge of Nonnenbruch wood, engaged German artillery east of Uffholtz, firing at ranges of 3,000 to 3,200 meters. Meanwhile, the 2nd Group at Lutterbach targeted German infantry but sustained counter-battery fire from guns concealed in the woods. A regimental observation log noted: "Enemy artillery well-positioned, fire adjusted by rangefinder or map, using mixed shrapnel and explosive shells, with shrapnel bursting high. French artillery employed shrapnel and explosive shells, with low bursts."

The engagement at Cernay concluded with a French withdrawal. From August 11, the division adopted a defensive stance along the border east of Belfort, and on August 12, one battery faced German 105 mm fire.

==== 39th RAC in Moselle ====
On August 14, 1914, five corps of the French 1st and 2nd Armies launched an offensive across the Lorraine plateau as part of the Battle of Morhange. The 20th Corps, under General Foch, included the 60th Field Artillery Regiment (RAC) as corps artillery (AC 20), the 8th RAC as divisional artillery for the 11th Division (AD 11), and the 39th RAC as divisional artillery for the 39th Division (AD 39), positioned on the left wing. A German counterattack on August 20 disrupted the French advance. At 06:00, two groups of the 39th RAC came under German artillery fire, resulting in the destruction of several caissons and depletion of ammunition reserves.

By 08:30, with German infantry advancing, the 1st Group ordered its limbers forward to withdraw the guns. The 3rd Group, unable to maneuver due to its exposed position and sustained fire, delayed withdrawal until after the infantry retreated, under German small-arms fire. The 1st Group alerted its advance trains, already retreating, and the 2nd Battery salvaged six guns and four caissons at speed. The 1st Battery's trains arrived too late as German infantry closed in, forcing officers to retreat on foot to Hill 302 under artillery and rifle fire.

The 2nd Group, deployed over a three-kilometer front with observation posts on ridges, engaged German infantry and artillery from a march formation. Around midday, the 6th Battery faced intense fire and was ordered to withdraw. Its position, identified by the enemy, complicated the retreat: an initial attempt to bring up limbers failed, with three drivers and several horses lost; a second attempt salvaged two guns and four caissons incrementally, moving them south of Hill 272. One gun, exposed on the right, was hit by artillery fire during retrieval attempts, while another was abandoned due to inaccessibility. Captain de S., wounded in the thigh, withdrew last with his crew. By 14:00, the 4th and 5th Batteries, alongside elements of the 49th Colonial Infantry and 146th Infantry Regiment, held Hill 272, surrounded. The 4th Battery fired obliquely at German forces advancing from Fonteny, while the 5th Battery targeted troops emerging from Viviers and Oron woods. The 49th Colonial, under shrapnel fire, evacuated Hill 270, followed by the two batteries retreating through the forest.

The 39th RAC lost 23 of its 36 guns and 26 caissons in the engagement, and its colonel was killed.

==== Fall of the Strongholds ====
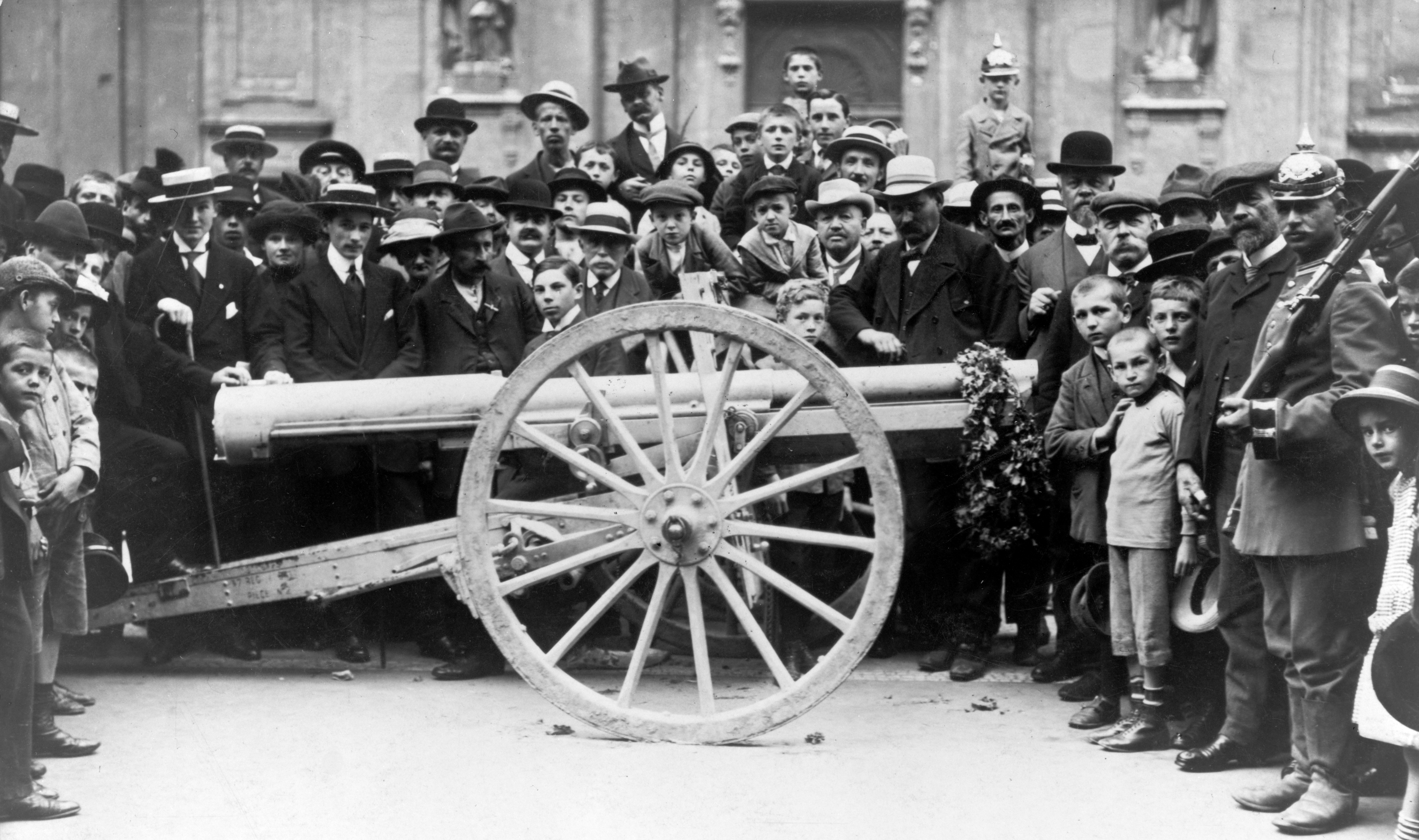
Captured French 75 mm gun, displayed as a trophy in front of German civilians. Among the hundreds of captured guns, several were rebored to 7.7 cm caliber to make anti-aircraft guns on mounts allowing firing at 50°, under the name of "7.7 cm L/35 Flak (franz)."

Following French setbacks in the Battle of the Frontiers (August 7–25, 1914), the 1st and 2nd Armies retreated, leaving northeastern border fortifications isolated. German forces subsequently surrounded and captured several strongholds: the citadel of Longwy (August 8–26), Fort Manonviller (August 23–27), Fort Charlemont (August 24–31), Fort des Ayvelles (August 25–27), Montmédy (August 25–28), and the forts of the Maubeugestronghold (August 24–September 7). The Lille stronghold was disarmed and evacuated starting August 24, while Calais and Dunkirk remained isolated, with the maritime plain flooded as a defensive measure.

German siege artillery, equipped with larger-caliber and more recent designs, engaged French fort artillery during these operations. The capture of Fort Manonviller, a modernized defensive position, exemplifies this disparity. The fort was armed with six artillery turrets: four with two 155 mm guns each (two Mougin modèle 1876 turrets and two Galopin modèle 1890 turrets) and two Bussière modèle 1893 turrets with two 57 mm guns each. Additional armament included 80 mm field guns, six 220 mm mortars, and four 150 mm mortars, operated by a battery from the 6th Foot Artillery Regiment (RAP). The German bombardment began on August 25 with 21 cm explosive shells from concealed batteries, limiting French counter-battery fire. On the first day, one 155 mm turret was disabled, and an ammunition stockpile of 2,200 shells for the 57 mm and 80 mm guns exploded. On August 26, two additional 155 mm turrets were destroyed, and a stockpile of 800 155 mm shells detonated. On August 27, at 04:20, two 42 cm howitzers commenced firing; the fourth 155 mm turret jammed, and the garrison surrendered, raising a white flag around 15:30. German forces fired a total of 979 rounds of 15 cm shells, 4,596 of 21 cm, 134 of 30.5 cm, and 59 of 42 cm at and around the fort.

In response to the German advance, orders were issued to reinforce second-line decommissioned strongholds. Between August 15 and 25, Fort Hirson was rearmed and garrisoned to support the 4th Reserve Division (4e GDR) but was evacuated and demolished with explosives on August 27. On August 26, the strongholds of La Fère and Laon, decommissioned by a decree of April 28, 1914, were placed under the 5th Army's command. A total of 48 modèle 1877 90 mm guns (26 at La Fère and 22 at Laon) were retrieved from fortification arsenals and positioned for defense. These positions were abandoned before German troops arrived.

=== Lessons Learned ===
During the Battle of Sarrebourg on August 20, 1914, General Legrand, commander of the 21st Corps, reported: "The enemy offensive extended south, supported by sustained howitzer fire from concealed positions, limiting French counter-battery response. Artillery on the ridge west of Walscheid was partially neutralized. The colonial brigade shifted from offensive operations to holding the heights on the left bank of the Bièvre, retreating to the heights west of La Valette after significant losses."

Following the Battle of the Ardennes around Longwy on August 22, General Ruffey, commander of the 3rd Army, issued an instruction: "Yesterday's attacks were unsuccessful due to insufficient artillery preparation and lack of infantry fire support. Infantry advances require prior artillery preparation and continuous support. Bayonet charges, as conducted, are unsustainable without these conditions."

In the maneuver warfare phase of August 1914, German howitzers frequently engaged French artillery effectively, though the mobility of French 75 mm mounted batteries allowed some to persist, despite delays in adjusting indirect fire. While some battles of the Ardennes (August 20–25, 1914) were limited to infantry skirmishes, the Battle of the Frontiers involved limited infantry action, the Battle of the Frontiers established artillery as the primary battlefield factor, with shells causing the majority of casualties. French batteries, each with four 75 mm guns, faced German batteries of six 7.7 cm guns, leveraging a higher firing rate (15-20 rounds per minute vs. 10-15) and shells with greater explosive yield. However, infantry-artillery coordination remained limited, leaving artillery units to independently target visible objectives. On August 19, two groups from the 5th RAC (AC 7) conducted a rare counter-battery action, firing explosive shells at 4,875 meters to destroy a German artillery group south of Brunstatt, capturing 18 guns. The 5th RAC war diary, under Colonel Nivelle, noted: "Visible artillery is vulnerable to destruction. Neutralizing targets, such as enemy artillery or positions like Dornach's edge, requires concentrated resources, prioritizing explosive shells for their destructive and psychological effects, with a recommended proportion of at least two-thirds explosive ammunition."

By late August 1914 in Upper Alsace, mid-September on the central front, and October in the north, frontlines stabilized, shifting combat dynamics. Infantry entrenched, and heavy artillery became central, with engagements at longer ranges using indirect fire from fixed positions and concentrated barrages. Shell consumption exceeded pre-war estimates, prompting field artillery adaptations, often through individual efforts. Colonel Estienne introduced two Blériot aircraft for observation with the 22nd Artillery Regiment during the Battle of Charleroi (August 21–23), a practice also effective in the Battle of the Two Morins (September 5–9). However, French heavy artillery remained insufficient for engaging fortifications or countering German batteries. On September 23, 1914, the Minister of War supplied General Joffre with 108 modèle 1881–1912 155 mm short guns (modified in 1912 with a portable wooden platform) and 120 modèle 1881–1891 220mm mortars (modified in 1891 with a hydro-pneumatic recoil system).

Captain Leroy, in History and Organization of Artillery (1922), reflected: "French forces had fewer heavy artillery pieces compared to German capabilities, which were more developed. During critical moments, German guns, positioned beyond French reach, fired from exposed locations without significant opposition."

=== Shell Crisis ===
==== Initial Stockpile ====
At the start of World War I in August 1914, the French military held a stockpile of 4,866,167 cartridges (shells and casings) for its 75 mm guns, averaging approximately 1,000 rounds per gun based on the field army's 4,728 mobilized 75 mm guns. Heavy artillery reserves, intended for lower consumption rates, included:

- 1,280,000 rounds of 120 mm ammunition for the Baquet howitzer and the Bange gun, with 400 to 450 rounds per gun allocated to the field army.
- 78,000 rounds of 155 mm ammunition for the Rimailho gun, averaging about 540 rounds per unit.
- 1,400,000 rounds of 155 mm ammunition for De Bange guns in fortress positions.

These stockpiles were prepared for a war of maneuver. The General Staff had established a wartime manufacturing plan to replenish reserves, utilizing arsenals at Bourges, Lyon, Tarbes, and Rennes to assemble shells, casings, and explosives. The plan targeted production of 800,000 cartridges at an initial rate of 25,000 per day. From the 65th day after mobilization (around October 5, 1914), manufacturing was set to stabilize at 13,600 rounds per day, with 3,500 of these from private industry.

==== Ammunition Shortages ====
During the Battle of the Frontiers (August 7–25, 1914) and the First Battle of the Marne (September 6–12, 1914), French forces expended approximately half of their initial 4,866,167-round stockpile of 75 mm ammunition. On September 9, 1914, the general responsible for logistics reported to the Minister of War that reserves at the six central depots—Bourges, Angers, Rennes, Clermont, Lyon, and Nîmes—were substantially depleted. By September 19, consumption since August 2 averaged 700 rounds per 75 mm gun, sufficient for one month of combat based on the mobilized total of 4,728 guns. An additional 650 rounds per gun remained at the front in wagons and depots, with 45 rounds per gun held in rear depots, railway stations, and arsenals.

On September 20, General Joffre wrote to the Minister of War: "Artillery ammunition production must increase, or active operations will be unsustainable beyond November 1." He estimated a minimum daily need of 50,000 rounds, or twelve rounds per gun per day for the 4,728 mobilized guns, though a 15-minute barrage could expend approximately 100 rounds per gun. That day, the Minister of War met with industrial leaders in Bordeaux to boost production, projecting 20,000 rounds per day by late October and 40,000 by early December. Actual production reached 23,400 rounds per day in October but dropped to 11,300 in November due to shortages of labor, machinery, and raw materials.

==== Conservation Measures ====
On September 22, the Grand Quartier Général (GQG) issued a directive to armies on stabilized fronts, excluding those north of the Oise, to regulate artillery ammunition use: "Artillery fire must target specific objectives and avoid broad areas unless required to support infantry advances or counter enemy attacks. General barrages are to be avoided." The directive also advised prioritizing shrapnel shells, which had been used less frequently than explosive shells.

On September 24, General Joseph Joffre instructed army commanders to shift from broad offensives, which consumed significant resources with limited gains, to localized assaults focusing on designated targets. He also suggested nighttime operations to reduce artillery ammunition expenditure. In a further communication, Joffre stated: "Current rear reserves are depleted. At this rate of consumption, ammunition shortages will halt operations within fifteen days. All available munitions should be preserved for a planned offensive. This guidance is essential to sustain the campaign."

==== Rationing ====
On September 27, 1914, the French military implemented ammunition rationing, limiting supplies to 300 rounds per 75 mm gun for army units, including depot stocks, with remaining reserves held back. Deliveries were paused until October 20 to prioritize units involved in the Race to the Sea, leading to the suspension of the 9th Army's attacks in Champagne by the evening of September 27 due to insufficient shells.

On the same day, General Ferdinand Foch issued a secret instruction: "To reduce artillery ammunition use during the defensive phase supporting the left flank's maneuver, corps artillery will adopt a defensive stance. Batteries will adjust fire or target with single guns rather than salvoes, reserving salvoes for specific, observable targets. Area bombardments are not to be conducted. Consumption is to be limited to an average of 13 rounds per gun per day across the corps until further notice."

On September 28, the Grand Quartier Général (GQG) directed armies to report daily 75 mm shell usage by encrypted telegram to the logistics director before 18:00. In October, daily consumption averaged 38,000 cartridges (approximately 1 million rounds monthly), with the 2nd Army accounting for half. On October 2, for example, 38,759 shells were fired: the 2nd Army used 31,300 in Picardy, while the Group of Territorial Divisions (GDT) used 950, the 6th and 5th Armies fired 1,088 and 191 rounds on the Aisne, the 9th Army used 483 near Reims, the 4th Army fired 1,259 in Argonne, the 3rd Army used 658 on the Hauts de Meuse, and the 1st Army expended 2,830 on the Lorraine plateau and Vosges.

Stocks from fortified camps and colonial depots were redirected to the front. During autumn 1914, approximately 500 modèle 1877 90 mm guns replaced some 75 mm guns; these fired at a lower rate (about 2-3 rounds per minute vs. 15-20 for the 75 mm) but utilized existing ammunition reserves. Production of 90 mm rounds reached around 2,000 per day, yet shortages emerged, prompting their phased withdrawal starting in April 1915.

By early 1915, French production stabilized to meet artillery demands, also supplying cartridges to the Belgian, Serbian, and Russian armies.

==== Defective Ammunition ====
Alongside limited 75 mm shell supplies, defects in these shells emerged as an issue in 1914. Some failed to detonate, others exploded prematurely, and some burst within the gun barrel upon firing, damaging the weapon and causing casualties among crews. Between August and December 1914, six barrel bursts were recorded, averaging one per 500,000 rounds fired. From December 20, 1914, to March 20, 1915, 236 incidents occurred, including 176 in the 4th Army, equating to one burst per 3,000 rounds fired. To mitigate risks, lanyards were introduced by early 1915, enabling crews to fire from a safer distance.

In January 1915, shell production processes were examined. Identified issues included inconsistent material quality, shifts to machining shells in private workshops (rather than stamping, due to equipment constraints), and defects linked to accelerated output. Quality controls and tolerances were adjusted to approximate peacetime standards, reducing barrel bursts to one per 11,000 rounds by spring 1915 and one per 50,000 by late summer.

Defects persisted throughout the war, with investigations identifying multiple causes: incomplete detonations from settled or crystallized explosives, misfires from degraded primers or production flaws, cracked casings reused up to eight times, shells falling short due to insufficient or damp propellant, erratic trajectories from barrel wear or fouling (including copper deposits), and foreign objects (e.g., nails, screws, wood, string, cloth, gloves) in propellant charges.

To address variability in explosive charges and machining tolerances, 75 mm shells were sorted by weight starting in spring 1915 to enhance accuracy. Explosive shells weighing 4.85 to 5 kg were marked with an "L," 5 to 5.15 kg with one cross, 5.151 to 5.3 kg with two crosses, and 5.301 to 5.45 kg with three crosses. Heavy artillery shell weights were directly painted in kilograms.

=== Propaganda ===
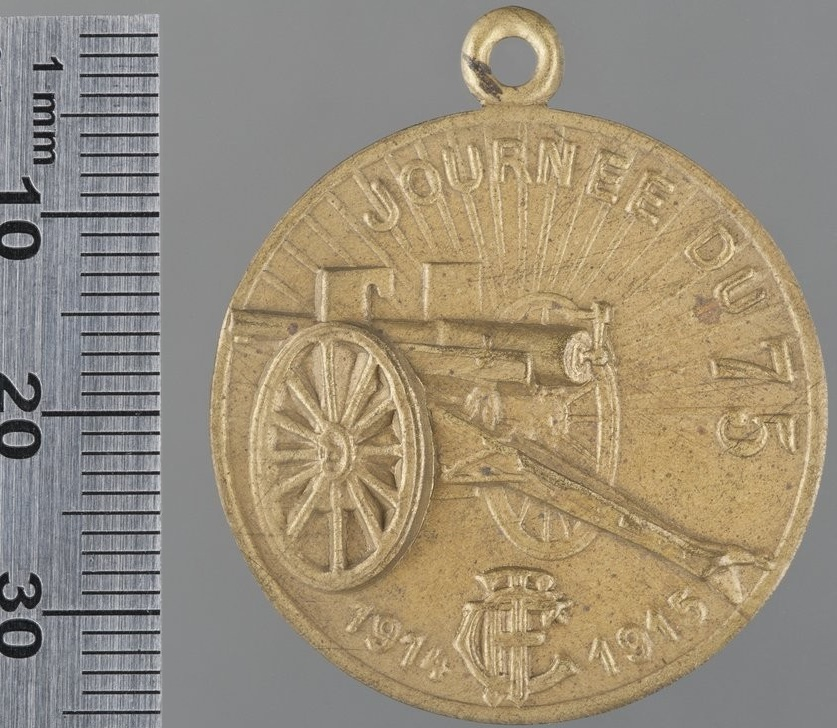
Commemorative medal of the “Day of 75” of 1915.

Amid ammunition shortages and defects, French propaganda in 1915 highlighted the 75 mm gun's role. Théophile Schloesing, in The "75": The Cannon, the Firing, the Projectiles (1915), wrote: "The German cannon requires less preparation, is lighter once positioned, and has a lighter caisson with a larger shield surface. However, it differs in stability, aiming, sweeping fire, fuse adjustments, depth firing, firing speed, and ballistic qualities. Thus, it was anticipated that the 120 75 mm pieces per French army corps would outperform the 144 pieces of a German corps."

A patriotic song, "The "75", composed in 1915 by Jean Aubert of the Nice Opera with lyrics by François Armagnin and music by F. Giraud, celebrated the gun:

Chorus

The light cannon that France

Hails and celebrates in turn,

Will grant us through its power,

The great Victory, one fine day.

We love its strong eloquence;

Its voice promises us the return,

After the hour of vengeance,

To the sweet law of love.

I

The soil of Alsace and Lorraine,

Thanks to it, will be cleared:

No more Germans with hyena hearts,

Faithless, shameless, without pity!

II

It is the master of the battle,

The protector of our soldiers,

Though it is small in stature,

The mighty cannot resist it.

III

When the "75" roars,

Terrified, dreading their fate,

The Huns, sons of a vile race,

With clenched fists, await their death.

IV

With you, English, Russian, Belgian,

It marches the road to Berlin.

Kaiser Wilhelm, the sacrilegious,

Shall no longer rule the Rhine

In 1915, Senator Charles Humbert's slogan "Cannons! Ammunition!" appeared frequently in his newspaper Le Journal and was adapted into a song refrain. The 280 mm shell was informally termed the "Charles Humbert," linked to its loud report and destructive impact.

== Build-up of Power ==
As the conflict shifted to trench warfare in the autumn of 1914, a development contemporaries likened to an extended siege, French artillery adjusted its equipment, organization, and tactics to meet new demands.

=== More Cannons ===
Pending the development and production of newer artillery models, the French military employed existing resources in late 1914. This included deploying older guns to the front, repurposing naval and coastal artillery, producing improvised trench mortars, and requisitioning export-bound cannons from manufacturers, such as the 75 mm modèle 1914 (originally the Schneider PD07, designed for the Russian Army). Subsequent programs expanded artillery inventories through phased initiatives: a ministerial decision on October 24, 1914, known as the "De Bange barrier," allocated older De Bange guns; a reorganization of heavy artillery was ordered on July 27, 1915; and a plan on May 30, 1916, increased the number of 155 mm short guns threefold. (Note: For industrial planning, the implementation of programs takes time, necessary for the design, production and training of materials and personnel; the time lag sometimes reaches a full year, with French industry having difficulty keeping up.)

==== First Makeshift Solutions ====
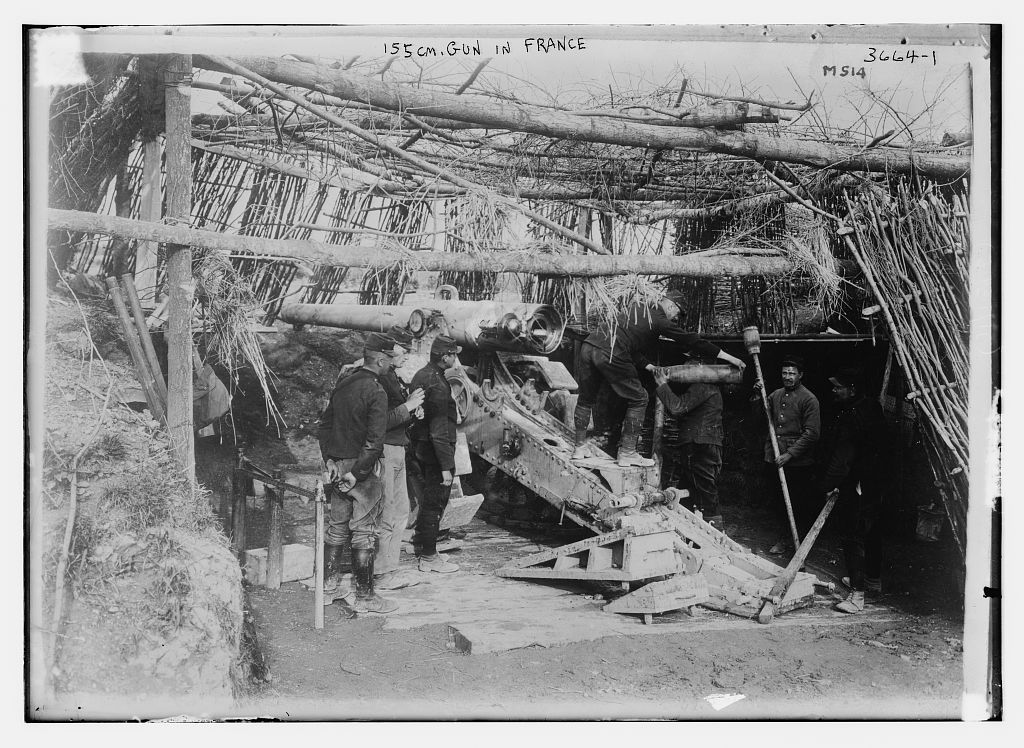
A 155 mm L model 1877 open breech for loading the shell (the powder canister will follow). The SP carriage (which weighs 3.2 t) is completed by cingolis (Note: The cingoli (from the Italian cingoli, tracks) are articulated wheel belts, used from 1913 to absorb part of the recoil (the wheels rubbing inside) of the 120 mm and 155 mm de Bange guns. They were invented by the Italian captain and then major Crispino Bonagente, to increase the width of the wheels (which facilitates off-road transport) and reduce ground pressure (which prevents gullies from being dug into the battery).) and return wedges in battery; the installation of such a gun takes an hour, not to mention the pit, the wooden platform and the camouflage.

On September 22, 1914, the Grand Quartier Général (GQG) requested artillery pieces from fortified positions from the Ministry of War. (Note: The Regulations on the Service of War Places, promulgated by the decree of October 7, 1909, gave the governors of the strongholds a certain autonomy vis-à-vis the general-in-chief, in particular through article 151: "the commander-in-chief cannot remove from a place under his orders any fraction of the defense garrison determined by the Minister." The decree of August 5, 1915 modifies this regulation, placing the places located in the army zone under the orders of the general-in-chief, who "has, without restrictions, the entire garrison of the strongholds under his orders and all the war or food resources that are either in the place or in its requisition zones.") Received on September 24, these were distributed to army commanders. The guns, primarily older models on "siege and fort" carriages, had reduced mobility and lower firing rates, using powder charges rather than cartridge shells to conserve brass. These included the modèle 1877 90 mm guns, which replaced 75 mm guns in approximately 100 field batteries to preserve 75 mm ammunition; the modèle 1875 95 mm and modèle 1878 120 mm guns, assigned to new field batteries for army corps (the 120 mm often used for counter-battery fire); and the modèle 1877 155 mm guns and modèle 1880 220 mm mortars, retained by foot artillery in heavy batteries at the army level for engaging entrenched positions. This initiative, termed the "De Bange barrier," supported frontline operations pending the arrival of newer heavy artillery.

By November 27, 1914, as trench warfare increased demand and heavy siege guns became available, the General Staff assigned one group (two batteries of four guns each) of heavy artillery—105 mm, 120 mm, or 155 mm long—to each army corps and reserve division group. Additional heavy batteries were held at the army level, either in reserve or temporarily allocated to corps. For instance, on December 1, 1914, prior to the Champagne offensive, the 4th Army (five corps) deployed 488 75 mm guns (below its standard 600), 144 modèle 1877 90 mm guns, 16 65 mm guns, 14 80 mm guns, 30 120 mm long guns, 16 155 mm short rapid-fire guns, 34 modèle 1912 155 mm short guns, 26 15 cm smoothbore mortars, and six self-propelled guns. General de Langle requested four 155 mm long guns and two 220 mm mortars on December 11.

From February 1916, 120 modèle 1877 155 mm long guns were refitted with a Schneider-designed carriage, incorporating a recoil brake, shield, and 42° elevation, achieving a firing rate of up to three rounds per minute. Designated the 155 mm L modèle 1877-1914 (contracted in 1913 but paused in August 1914), these upgrades improved performance. Some 120 mm and 155 mm guns also received tracked mobility. These guns were supported by horse-drawn transport (horses, limbers, caissons) and personnel drawn from fortifications, coastal batteries, and depots, including rear forts (Langres, Besançon, Dijon, Lyon, Grenoble, Toulon, and Brest) and frontline positions (the forts of Paris, Verdun, Toul, Épinal, and Belfort).

Recovered Artillery Pieces
Equipment	Mass in Battery	Rate of Fire	Maximum Range	Ammunition (Weight)
80 mm C Model 1877 de Bange	955 kg	one to two shots/min	8.7 km	shells with balls (6.3 kg) or explosive (5.9 to 6.1 kg)
80 mm M Model 1878 de Bange	305 kg	one to two shots/min	4.1 km	shells with balls (6.3 kg) or explosive (5.9 to 6.1 kg)
155 mm C Model 1881 de Bange	2,080 kg	one shot/min	6.2 km	shells with balls (40.5 to 40.8 kg) or explosive (41.3 to 43.7 kg)
155 mm C Model 1881-1912 Filloux	4,660 kg	one to two shots/min	7.8 km	shells with balls (40.5 to 40.8 kg) or explosive (41.3 to 43.7 kg)
155 mm C Model 1890 Baquet	3,115 kg	one to two shots/min	7.8 km	shells with balls (40.5 to 40.8 kg) or explosive (41.3 to 43.7 kg)

Old Artillery Pieces in the Armies
Calibers	30/11/1914	1/05/1915	1/10/1915	1/02/1916	1/08/1916	1/12/1916	1/08/1917	5/11/1918
80 mm mod 1877 or 78 de Bange	88	168	455	467	408	407	494	32
90 mm Model 1877 de Bange	587	612	1,570	1,783	1,452	1,349	1,193	144
95 mm Model 1875 Lahitolle	243	435	900	857	894	896	1,094	241
120 mm L model 1878 de Bange	286	540	1,480	1,335	1,338	1,110	1,407	526
155 mm L model 1877 de Bange	112	328	630	629	738	669	943	?
220 mm Model 1880 de Bange	14	63	190	169	306	200	193	?
270 mm Model 1884 de Bange	0	4	51	46	53	66	24	14

==== New field guns ====
The 75 mm gun continued to serve as a primary artillery piece for French forces. To address losses—447 guns were abandoned or captured between August 1914 and February 1915—and to equip additional batteries, production resumed in the autumn of 1914. On September 25, 1914, 240 75 mm guns were ordered withdrawn from Algeria. In February 1915, field batteries were reduced from four to three guns to stretch existing stocks. Schneider received orders for 160 modèle 1897 and 80 modèle 1912 75 mm guns, with deliveries starting in spring 1915, followed by 200 modèle 1912 guns in May 1915 and 200 modèle 1915 guns from Saint-Chamond. Production of the modèle 1897 reached 200 guns per month by summer 1915, increased to 500 per month in 1916-1917, and approached 700 per month in 1918, totaling approximately 17,000 guns produced during the war (not 27,000, as earlier estimates included pre-war stocks). Despite this output, the 75 mm guns had limited range and explosive power for trench destruction or counter-battery fire, necessitating heavier artillery.

Schneider had developed models originally intended for export, particularly to Russia, some ordered by the French Army before 1914. Production of the 105 mm L modèle 1913 gun (initially the Russian 42-line, 106.7 mm) began in August 1914; twelve guns from an order of 220 were delivered at mobilization and assigned to the 6th Army on September 16, 1914 (IV/2nd RAL). In November 1913, Schneider received an order for 18 280 mm TR Model 1914 mortars (a 279.4 mm breech-loading howitzer, originally the Russian 11-inch), with deliveries planned for 1915. Additionally, eleven 120 mm howitzer batteries, intended for Bulgaria, were requisitioned from the Creusot factory and deployed with the French Army in the East.

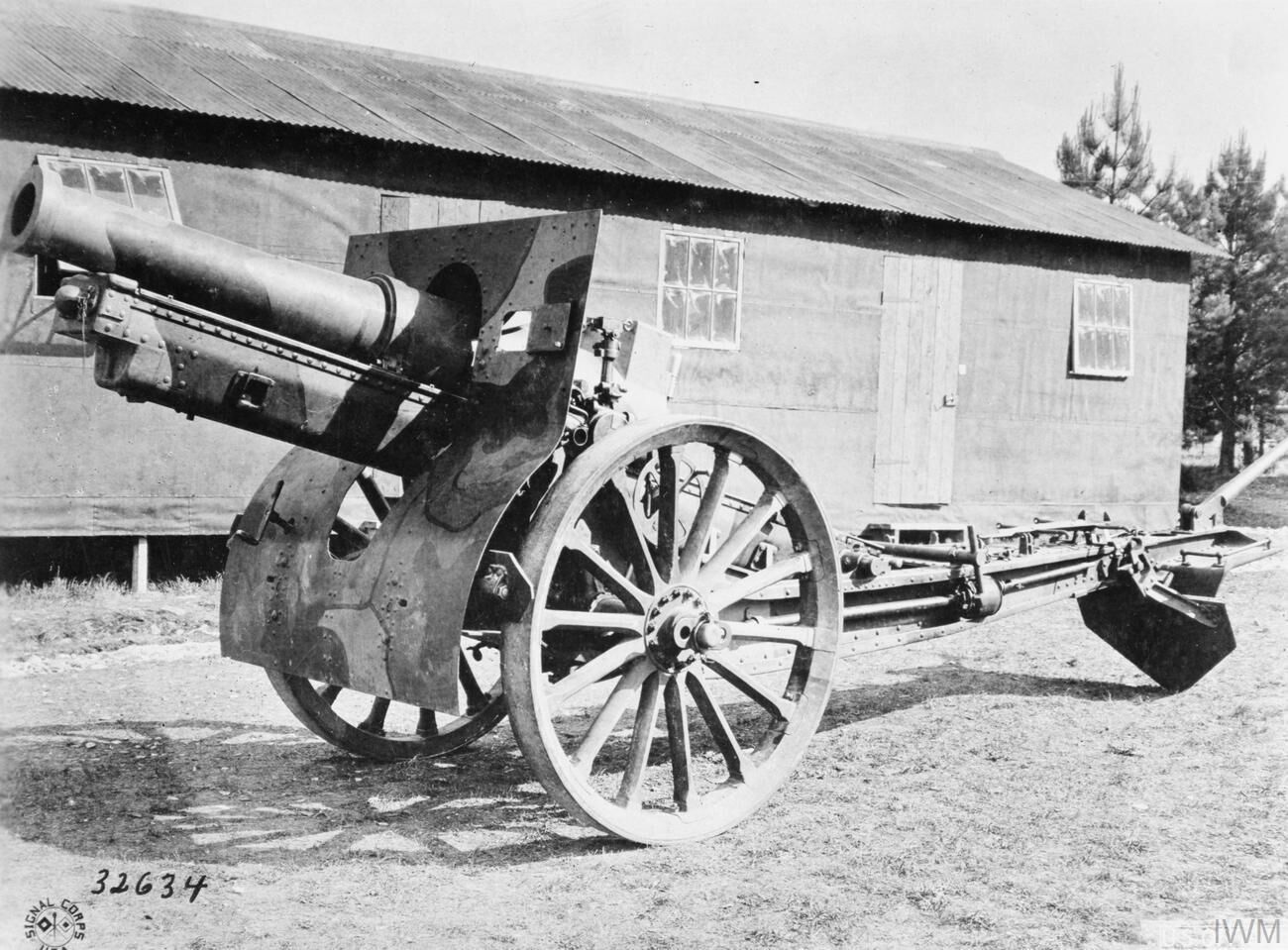
The 155 mm C model 1917 S cannon was developed to disrupt entrenchments with its curved shot (initial velocity of 450 m/s) and its powerful projectile (FA model 1915 shell weighing 43.55 kg, including 4.8 kg of explosive).

In June 1915, General Joseph Joffre requested short-barreled 155 mm howitzers to target enemy fortifications. In October 1915, 512 of these guns were ordered: Schneider supplied the 155 mm C 1915 and 1917 S models (derived from its 6-inch howitzer for Russia), while Saint-Chamond provided the 155 mm C 1915 CH (originally developed for Mexico). Deliveries began in summer 1916 at a rate of 60 guns per month. Additionally, 40 220 mm TR modèle 1915 mortars, adapted from Schneider's 9-inch Russian design, were ordered in October 1915, with deliveries starting in winter 1916-1917.

The Army also sought long-range artillery. Pending new designs, 48 modèle 1897 100 mm naval guns, previously coastal artillery, were removed from fixed mounts and fitted to field carriages between spring 1915 and spring 1916. This reduced their firing rate from six to one round per minute, though their shells achieved an initial velocity of 760 m/s, providing a range of 9.5 km with the 1898-1908 shell (at 28° elevation) and 13.5 km with the 1915 Type D shell. Six groups, each with two batteries of four guns, were formed; five were withdrawn by late 1916 due to barrel wear, and three were reestablished in spring 1917 with 24 guns re-bored to 105 mm, before returning to coastal use by late 1917.

For greater range, 39 naval guns of 14 cm (138.6 mm) caliber were adapted: 15 new tubes, 12 from the decommissioned battleships Carnot and Charles Martel, and 12 worn tubes re-bored to 145 mm, all mounted on custom field carriages. Ordered in January 1916, deliveries occurred between September 1916 and July 1917. In 1916, production of 200 additional guns, designated the 145 mm modèle 1916 (tubes from Ruelle foundry, carriages by Saint-Chamond), was authorized, with deliveries extending to early 1918. These guns achieved an initial velocity of 794 m/s, and re-boring to 155 mm was planned from autumn 1918. Two long-barreled 155 mm designs were adopted in 1916: the 155 mm L modèle 1917 S (using the modèle 1877-1914 carriage) and the 155 mm Model 1917 GPF (with a biface carriage allowing 60° traverse), both reaching the front in summer 1917).

New Artillery Pieces
Equipment	Weight in Battery	Rate of Fire	Maximum Range	Ammunition (Weight)
75 mm model 1914 S	1,096 kg	12 to 18 shots/min	6.3 km	shells with bullets (7.2 to 7.4 kg) or explosive shells (5.5 to 7.2 kg)
75 mm model 1915 CH	1,090 kg	12 to 18 shots/min	6.5 km	shells with bullets (7.2 to 7.4 kg) or explosive shells (5.5 to 7.2 kg)
100 mm TR model 1897	6,000 kg	one shot/min	13.5 km	explosive shells (13.3 to 14.3 kg)
105 mm model 1913 S	2,350 kg	6 to 8 shots/min	12.5 km	shells with bullets (16.9 kg) or explosive shells (15.4 to 16 kg)
120 mm model Schneider	2,150 kg	ten shots/min	8.1 km	explosive shells (19.7 to 21 kg)
14 cm model 1891	10,940 kg	one shot/min	15.8 km	explosive shells (30.5 to 36.5 kg)
14 cm model 1910	11,935 kg	one shot/min	17.4 km	explosive shells (30.5 to 36.5 kg)
145 mm model 1910	12,000 kg	two shots/min	17.6 km	explosive shells (33.7 to 36 kg)
145 mm model 1916	12,500 kg	three shots/2 min	18.5 km	shells with bullets (36.4 kg) or explosive shells (33.7 to 36 kg)
C models 1915 and 1917 S	3,220 and 3,300 kg	four shots/min	11.9 km	explosive shells (41 to 44.8 kg)
155 mm C model 1915 CH	2,860 kg	three shots/min	9.3 km	explosive shells (41 to 44.8 kg)
155 mm L model 1917 S	8,710 kg	three shots/min	15.9 km	explosive shells (41 to 44.8 kg)
155 mm model 1917 GPF	11,200 kg	3 to 4 shots/min	16.3 km	explosive shells (41 to 44.8 kg)
220 mm TR models 1915 and 1916 S	7,455 and 7,792 kg	two shots/min	10.8 km	explosive shells (100.5 kg)
280 mm model 1914 S	16,000 kg	one shot/min	10.9 km	explosive shells (202 to 275 kg)

Modern Pieces in the Army
Calibers	30/11/1914	1/05/1915	1/10/1915	1/02/1916	1/08/1916	1/12/1916	1/08/1917	5/11/1918
37 mm TR model 1916	34	138	140	149	195	483	?	?
65 mm M model 1906	80	84	85	79	72	36	183	136
75 mm model 1897, 1912, 14 and 15	3,539	3,071	3,524	3,819	4,029	4,446	5,890	5,145
100 mm TR model 1897	0	4	24	48	45	27	48	0
105 mm model 1913 S	24	51	79	83	79	105	327	576
120 mm C model 1890 Baquet	59	43	150	143	131	125	141	10
155 mm C model 1915 CH	0	0	0	0	0	72	?	?
155 mm C model 1917 S	0	0	0	0	46	136	433	?
155 mm C TR model 1904 Rimailho	101	97	93	90	81	50	33	0
155 mm C model 1881-1912	102	161	330	329	372	314	387	?
155 mm L model 1877-1914 S	0	0	0	0	23	60	105	?
220 mm TR model 1915 and 1916	0	0	0	0	0	0	39	?
280 mm TR model 1914	0	0	2	6	16	18	32	65

==== Heavy High-Powered Artillery ====
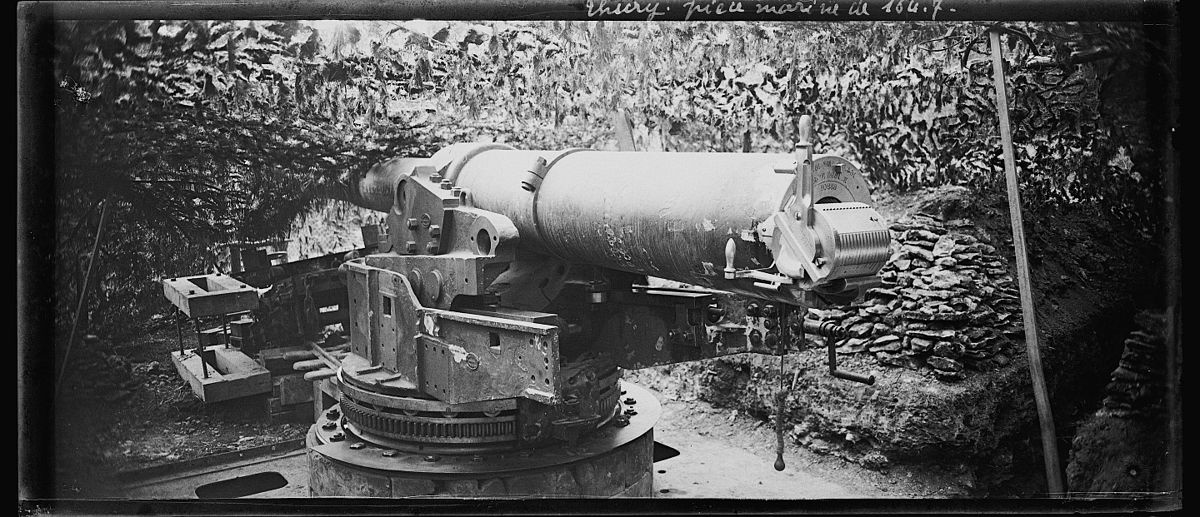
16 cm naval gun under a camouflage net in Thury-en-Valois, in 1918. We can clearly see the concrete location and the fixed mount which allows 360° firing.

In September 1914, the potential for a siege of the Paris fortified camp, recalling the 1870-1871 precedent, prompted the deployment of naval artillery for long-range support. Starting in October, naval guns with their crews were sent to the Verdun arsenal (for the northern fortified region) and the Toul arsenal (for the Grand Couronné of Nancy). These included modèle 1910 14 cm (138.6 mm) guns, originally for the Bretagne class battleships, and modèle 1887, 1891, and 1893 16 cm (164.7 mm) guns from the République, Suffren, and Iéna classes. Mounted on their ship's gun platforms, they were placed in fixed positions, some in semi-buried casemates; several were captured in February 1916 in the Fays and Vauche woods. Also in September, two 200 mm Schneider short-barreled guns, ordered by Peru in 1908 but undelivered, were seized at Le Creusot and mounted on railway trucks. These initial heavy artillery railway guns (ALVF) fired on October 5, 1914, supporting the Belgian Army's retreat after the Siege of Antwerp.

On October 14, 1914, the Grand Quartier Général (GQG) requested artillery from naval, coastal, and industrial sources (Schneider and Saint-Chamond) for mounting on concrete platforms or locomotive chassis. A group of 19 cm coastal guns was established, later reinforced with 240 mm and 270 mm guns from coastal batteries, gradually deployed to the front. In November 1914, a 240 mm G modèle 1884 gun (53 tons) on a circular mount was moved from Calais to Pérouse (Fourches woods, east of Fort de la Justice) to bolster the Belfort fortified camp. In December 1914, four modèle 1870-1887 24 cm guns from the Couplets battery near Cherbourg were transferred to the front, despite objections from the regional admiral-prefect.

On October 25, 1914, the GQG listed desired large-caliber guns, approved by the Minister of War on October 31: one 305 mm naval gun, two 274 mm naval guns, eight 240 mm coastal guns, and twelve 19 cm coastal guns. Orders were issued to arsenals and manufacturers, with naval guns requiring rifling and all mounted on railway trucks or fixed wooden platforms. Deliveries began in early 1915, forming batteries within foot artillery regiments or independent groups, assigned by GQG to armies, supplemented by four gunboats in November 1914 and sixteen 240 mm guns in February 1915. new program on March 9, 1915, targeted 201 guns, including eight 400 mm pieces, with expansions on June 22, 1915, May 30, 1916, June 22, 1916, and February 24, 1917 (the latter adding 318 guns). Industrial production delays extended deliveries over one to two years. On June 28, 1915, the heavy high-powered artillery command (ALGP) was established under General Vincent-Duportal, overseeing ALVF, gunboats, and other large-caliber guns, focusing on training and operational protocols. This force joined the general reserve of heavy artillery on February 14, 1917, and was reorganized into six, later eight, RALGP regiments (nos. 70-78).

Bulky parts

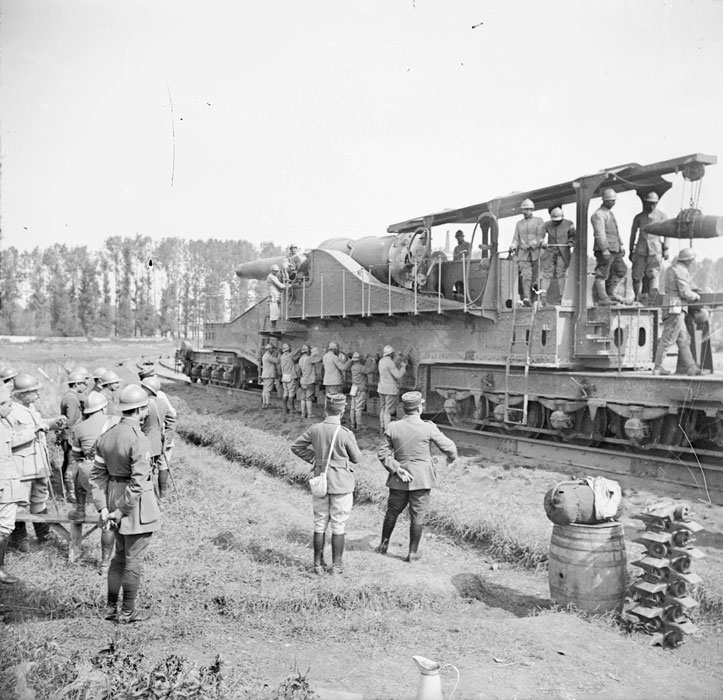
Presentation of a 320 mm model 1870/84 cannon on a railway track to a Chinese military mission, in August 1917 in Thierville-sur-Meuse. The gunners operate the jacks lowering the six support crosspieces.

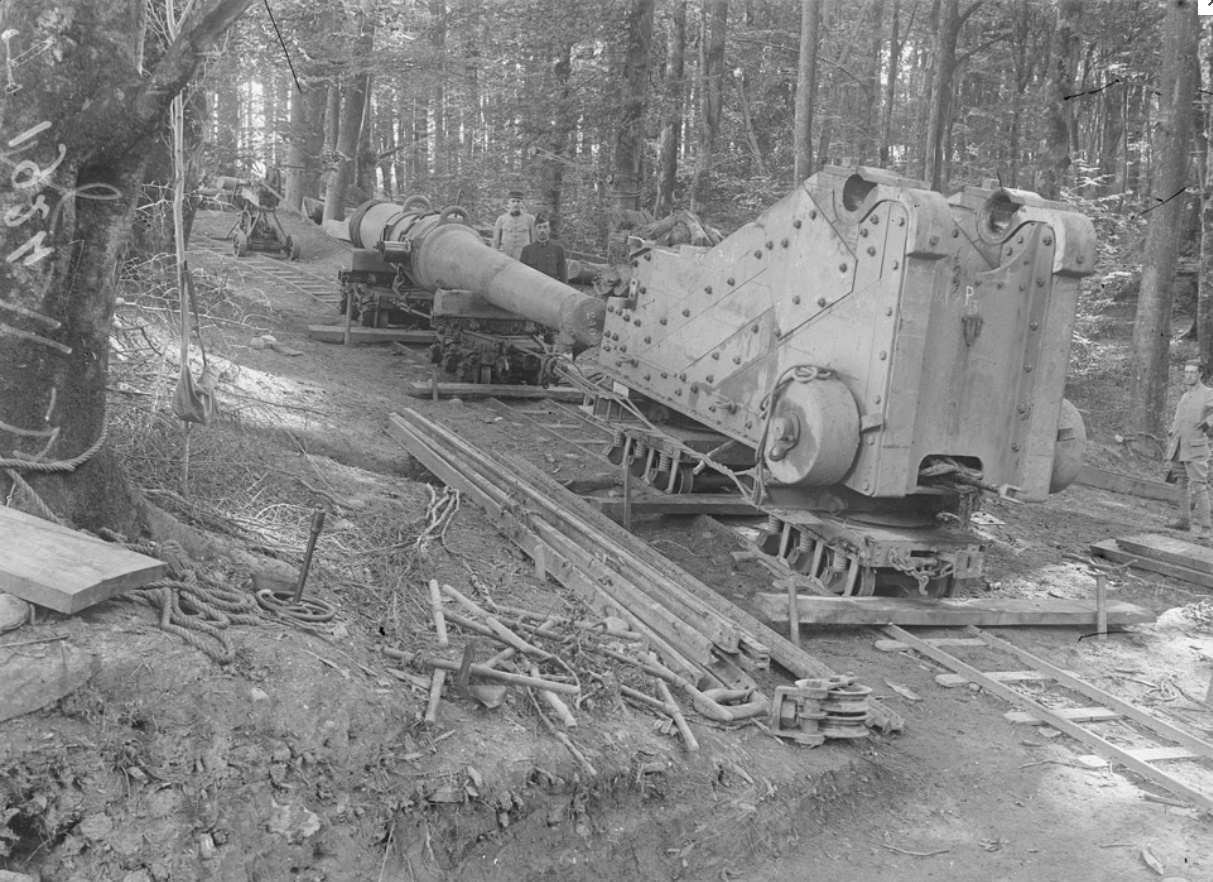
240 mm model 1884 cannon near Dannemarie in August 1916, dismantled into two bundles (carriage + tube) to be placed on a narrow track.

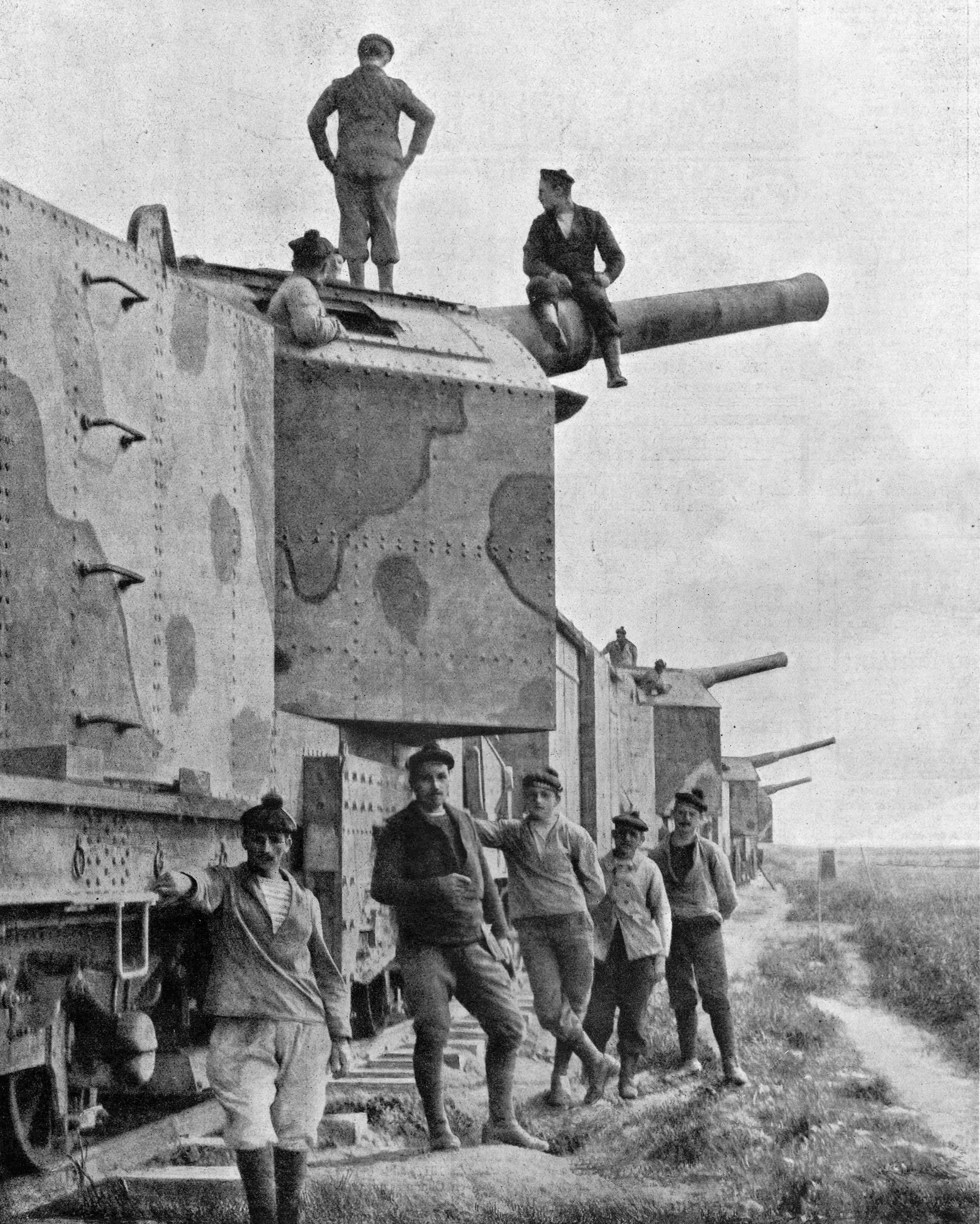
Marine gunners and their armoured train, armed with 19 cm model 1870-1893 guns on Schneider all-round truck mounts (TAZ).

For ALVF (heavy railway artillery) equipment, mounting configurations varied by gun weight. Guns up to 240 mm caliber were fitted on all-around swiveling mounts (TAZ, tout-azimut), stabilized by jacks anchored to the ground. Heavier guns used beam mounts, aligned with the railway track, with a curved section called an "épi" enabling directional adjustment. Sliding models managed recoil with oak timbers rubbing against beams parallel to the rails, while cradle models allowed the barrel to slide within a cradle before returning to position.

The ALGP (heavy high-powered artillery) primarily utilized 190 mm, 240 mm, and 320 mm calibers, adapted from coastal guns (designated 19 cm, 24 cm, and 32 cm, reflecting cast-iron bands around steel tubes). Additionally, eight modèle 1915 370 mm howitzers and twelve modèle 1915 and 1916 400 mm howitzers—re-bored from (305 mm and 340 mm—were deployed. These weapons engaged targets such as Fort de Douaumont in October 1916, the Mont Cornillet tunnels in May 1917, and Mort-Homme in August 1917.

By the November 1918 armistice, a modèle 1916 520 mm Howitzer was operational, though its twin had exploded during a test on July 27, 1918, at Saint-Pierre-Quiberon. Development of a long-range gun (TLP, tube longue portée) involved lining a 340 mm gun with a narrower, extended barrel, while deliveries of the 220 mm L modèle 1917 Schneider began in 1917.

ALGP on the front
Calibers	30/11/1914	1/05/1915	1/10/1915	1/02/1916	1/08/1916	1/12/1916	1/07/1917	1/01/1918	11/11/1918
14 cm models 1887, 1891, 1893 and 1910	0	22	18	24	16	28	12	3	4
16 cm models 1887, 1891, 1893 and 1893/96	0	5	17	22	20	28	30	30	37
19 cm models 1870/93, 1916 and 1917	0	0	16	24	23	24	46	78	100
200 mm "Peru" howitzer TAZ Schneider	0	2	0	0	2	2	2	2	2
240 mm models 1870/87, 1884, 1893/96, 1903, 1916 and 1917	0	2	8	23	33	40	112	148	213
270 mm model 1889	0	0	12	24	24	48	68	80	84
274 mm models 1887, 1893 and 1893/96	0	0	2	4	9	6	10	10	7
293 mm model 1914 Danish	0	0	0	6	4	6	6	6	6
305 mm models 1893/96 and 1917	0	0	2	6	10	13	11	11	10
320 mm models 1870/81, 1870/84 and 1870/93	0	0	0	0	24	40	44	44	44
340 mm models 1893 and 1912	0	0	0	0	2	4	4	4	6
370 mm howitzer model 1915	0	0	4	10	10	10	6	8	4
400 mm howitzer model 1915 and 1916	0	0	0	0	8	8	8	8	12
520 mm howitzer model 1916	0	0	0	0	0	0	0	0	1

==== Trench Mortars ====
In late September 1914, French infantry positioned in the Argonne region faced intense short-range fire from German trenches. This bombardment came from minenwerfers ("mine throwers"), heavy mortars originally sourced from the Metz fortress arsenals and operated by German pioneers of the 16th Corps under General von Mudra. These weapons proved effective in the Argonne's dense, uneven terrain, where limited visibility hindered traditional artillery observation and direct cannon fire. The 2nd French Corps experienced increasing casualties, prompting urgent requests for comparable equipment to counter the German advantage.

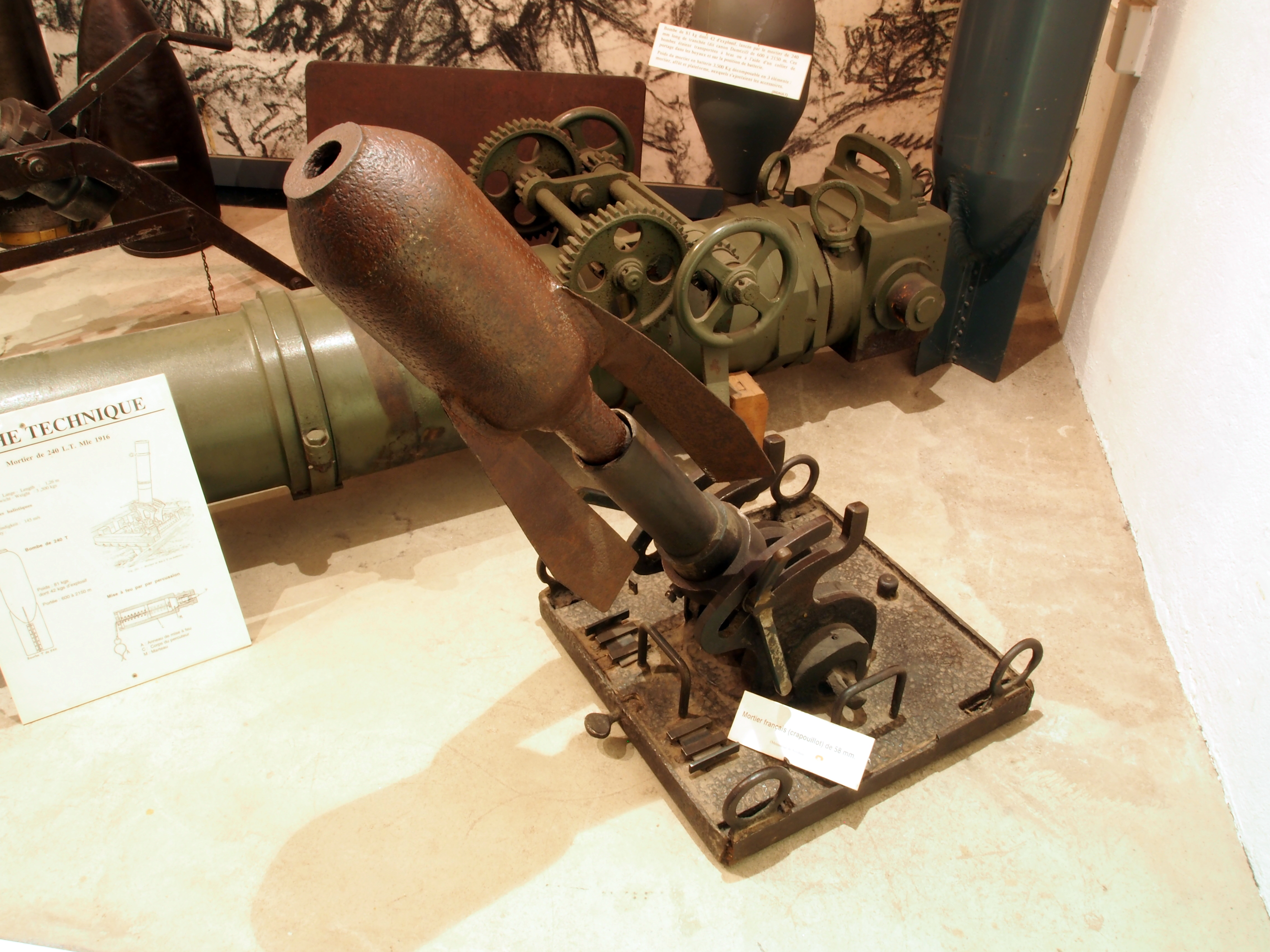
58 mm mortars in the foreground (loaded with its torpedo) and 240 mm LT in the background (with its bomb).

The French military initially responded by retrieving approximately 100 bronze 15 cm Model 1838 mortars from storage. These antiquated weapons, nicknamed "crapouillots" for their squat appearance, fired spherical black-powder bombs. As demand grew, frontline units began improvising mortars using salvaged materials—such as shell casings or obsolete cannon barrels—while factories produced additional designs to meet immediate needs. Examples included the Cellerier bomb launcher, the Gatard mine thrower, and the Imphy Type A launcher. By the winter of 1914–1915, development of purpose-built trench mortars accelerated. In January 1915, the first 70 units of the 58 mm T mortar, which fired finned projectiles, were deployed to the Artois front. Subsequent models, such as the 58 mm T No. 1 bis and the larger No. 2, were produced in large quantities at the Saint-Étienne arsenal, including the Leflaive factories in La Chaléassière.

Starting in February 1915, the French military reorganized trench mortar units. High-powered mortars were assigned to artillery batteries, typically organized in groups of twelve, while lower-powered models—such as 37 mm guns and later 81 mm Stokes mortars—remained with infantry units, often operated by specialized bomber platoons. That year, the Trench Artillery Training Center (Centre d'instruction de l'artillerie de tranchée, CIAT) was established in Bourges to train personnel. Early trench artillery crews included a mix of soldiers, some of whom were reassigned from disciplinary units across various military branches, supervised by reserve officers who took on these roles voluntarily.

Trench mortars had a short range but compensated with low muzzle velocities—approximately 70 m/s for the 58 mm T No. 1 bis—enabling the use of thin-walled projectiles with substantial explosive payloads. For comparison, a standard 75 mm artillery shell weighed about 5.4 kg, including 0.775 kg of explosives, whereas an LS-type bomb for the 58 mm T No. 2 mortar weighed 18 kg, carrying 5 kg of explosives. Additionally, starting in October 1915, around 1.5 million defective 75 mm shells, produced during the winter of 1914–1915, were repurposed as low-pressure projectiles for the 75 mm Schneider mortar, enhancing resource efficiency.

Trench Artillery Pieces
Equipment	Weight in Position	Rate of Fire	max. Range	Ammunition (Weight)
15 cm model 1838	150 kg	one round/2 min	600 m	Spherical bomb (7.5 kg, including 0.3 kg of explosive)
15 cm model 1838	150 kg	one round/2 min	450 m	Nicole bomb (10 kg, including 6 kg of explosive)
15 cm model 1838	150 kg	one round/2 min	225 m	Cernesson bomb (16 kg, including 7 kg of explosive)
Gatard Mine Launcher	105 kg	one round/3 min	174 to 480 m	Gatard mines (40 to 102 kg)
58 mm T no. 1	114 kg	one round/min	300 m	Bomb (16 kg, including 6 kg of explosive)
58 mm T no. 1 bis	181 kg	one round/min	450 to 530 m	Bomb (16 kg, including 6 kg of explosive)
58 mm T no. 2	417 kg	one round/min	650 m	Type A and B bombs (16 kg, including 6 kg of explosive)
58 mm T no. 2	417 kg	one round/min	1,250 m	LS bomb (18 kg, including 5 kg of explosive)
58 mm T no. 2	417 kg	one round/min	450 m	D bomb (40 kg, including 10 kg of explosive)
70 mm VD model 1915	350 kg	3 to 4 rounds/min	600 m	VD bomb (19 kg, including 6 kg of explosive)
75 mm model 1915 type A Schneider	300 kg	four rounds/min	1,700 m	Explosive shell model 1900 (5 kg, including 0.8 kg of explosive)
150 mm T model 1916	510 kg	three rounds/min	1,900 m	Bomb model 1915 (21 kg, including 8 kg of explosive)
150 mm T model 1916	510 kg	three rounds/min	1,930 m	Bomb model 1916 (18 kg, including 5 kg of explosive)
150 mm T model 1916	510 kg	three rounds/min	2,120 m	Bomb model 1917 (17 kg, including 5 kg of explosive)
150 mm T model 1917 Fabry	615 kg	four rounds/min	1,980 m	Bomb model 1917 (17 kg, including 5 kg of explosive)
240 mm CT model 1915	1,003 kg	one round/6 min	1,025 m	M bomb (87 kg, including 47 kg of explosive)
240 mm CT model 1915	1,003 kg	one round/6 min	1,440 m	T bomb (83 kg, including 42 kg of explosive)
240 mm LT model 1916	3,600 kg	one round/6 min	1,440 m	T bomb (83 kg, including 42 kg of explosive)
240 mm LT model 1916	3,600 kg	one round/6 min	2,140 m	S bomb (85 kg, including 42 kg of explosive)
240 mm LT model 1916	3,600 kg	one round/6 min	2,150 m	AB bomb model 1918 (83 kg, including 40 kg of explosive)
240 mm LT model 1916	3,600 kg	one round/6 min	2,850 m	DH bomb model 1918 (50 kg, including 22 kg of explosive)
340 mm T	2,260 kg	one round/6 min	2,375 m	Bomb model 1915 (195 kg, including 93 kg of explosive)

=== More ammunition ===
The shift from maneuver warfare to trench warfare during World War I transformed artillery tactics and ammunition use. In the earlier phase, light, mobile artillery delivered rapid but sporadic strikes. However, trench warfare introduced prolonged bombardments, often lasting hours or days, executed by heavier, less mobile batteries. This change dramatically increased shell consumption, with historical accounts noting intense and sustained barrages that overwhelmed defensive positions.

A vivid description of this escalation comes from the artillery preparation for the Champagne offensive in autumn 1915:

To the numerous, delicate, and fluid murmur of the 75s, which passed low with a rustling like torn silk, was added the grave and continuous roar of the 155s, and the slower breath of the 120s. Above, the heavy projectiles of the 220s—the brass instruments of this orchestra without a conductor—slowly cut through the high layers of air, snoring deeply like a man with a cold. Higher still, guided by the ear, the eye followed, marveling at its inability to intercept them mid-flight, the trajectories of the massive 270s. They moved in jerks, and their descent, accelerating in the chromatic scale, seemed to pause for a moment before concluding in a monstrous fan of blocks torn from the dry chalk.

— Description of the artillery preparation for the Champagne offensive in autumn 1915.

Average Daily Consumption of French Artillery by Caliber
Caliber	Dec. 1914	June 1915	September 1915	December 1915	June 1916	September 1916
65 mm	780	1,002	1,000	780	1,150	569
75 mm	24,077	62,160	148,404	20,330	171,610	226,290
80 mm	340	710	1,058	335	1,804	975
90 mm	6,350	2,636	7,600	1,630	6,119	8,920
95 mm	2,080	3,020	3,890	1,760	8,352	11,210
105 mm	150	1,291	1,895	125	5,754	4,206
120 mm	2,760	3,740	9,130	1,564	13,635	12,818
155 mm	3,080	5,697	11,210	1,787	19,456	28,230
220 mm	70	541	1,586	157	1,420	2,475

==== New Types of Ammunition ====
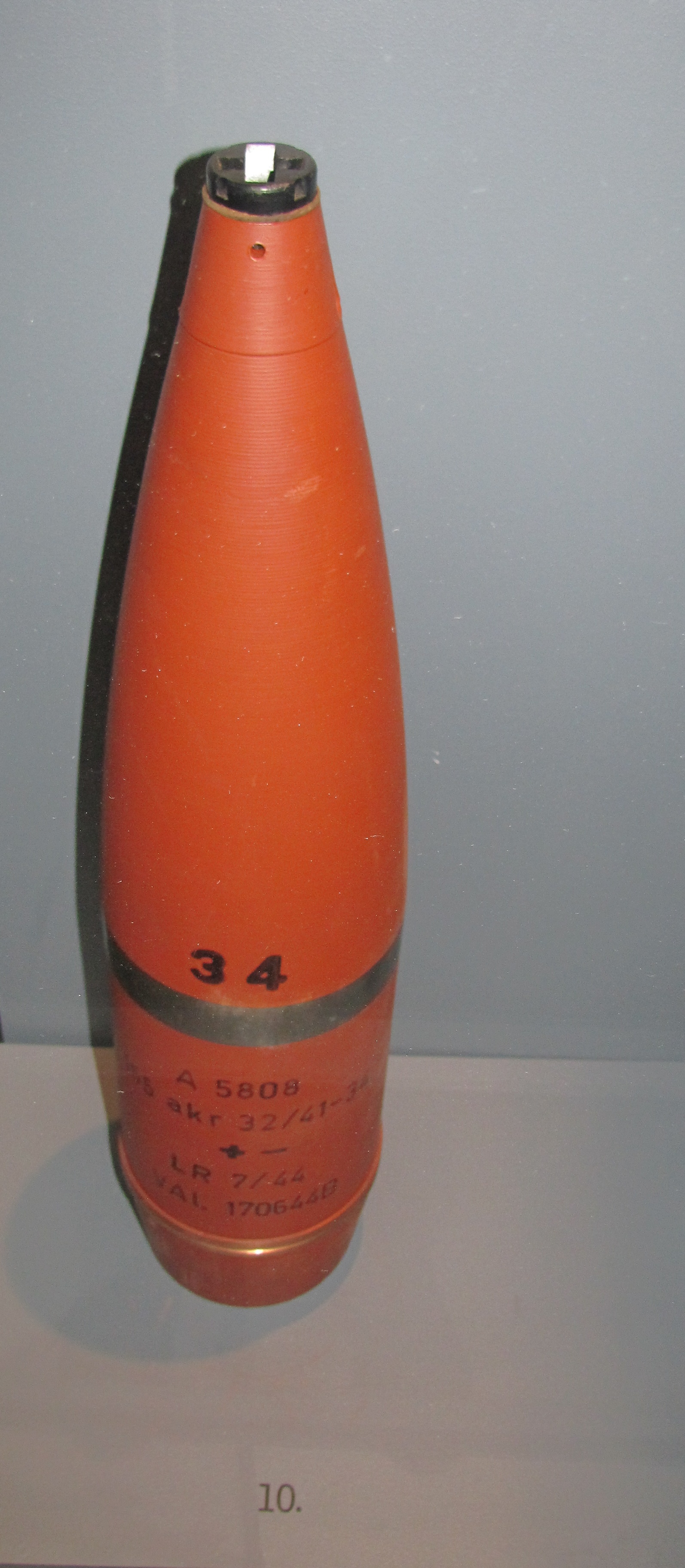
A 155 mm type D (Desaleux) shell, with slender shapes (here the markings are Finnish).

The ballistic performance of French projectiles improved through more powerful propellant charges, elongated profiles, and beveled bases (truncated cone shapes). For example, the 75 mm high-explosive shell, model 1917 type D, achieved a range of 11 km compared to the 8 km of earlier models (1900 and 1915). The effectiveness of these shells was closely studied: as early as late 1914, shells were made from cast iron (FA shells) instead of steel, both for cost savings and because cast iron produced more fragments.

New fuses were introduced, notably dual-effect fuses that allowed for either timed airburst fire (with graduated drums to adjust detonation time) or impact detonation using the same shell. Examples include the DE 24/31 mm model 1915 fuse, which replaced the DE 22/31 model 1897 and allowed adjustments from 0 to 24 seconds. These were adapted for type D shells (fuses DE 24/31 A 1916 and 1918, adjustable up to 32 seconds) and the long-range shells of heavy artillery (DE LD 24/31 1917 and 1918, adjustable up to 51 seconds). Impact fuses diversified between instantaneous types (detonating at ground level, such as the I 24/31 model 1914 and IA 24/31 model 1915, which replaced the 24/31 model 1899) and delayed types (with delays of 0.05 or 0.15 seconds, creating craters).

During the war of movement in August and September 1914, shrapnel shells were primarily used. However, as the war bogged down into trench warfare, explosive shells proved more useful. Consequently, the ammunition batches delivered to parks were modified. Initially composed of 2,952 explosive shells and 3,384 shrapnel shells per batch (each batch containing 5,976 75 mm rounds, typically packed in 664 crates of nine rounds each), by November 1914, the composition shifted to 5,688 explosive shells and 288 shrapnel shells. By June 1915, the ratio further evolved to 5,391 explosive shells and 585 shrapnel shells.

Artillery fired millions of explosive shells, supplemented by shrapnel shells, but also smoke shells (loaded with phosphorus), incendiary shells (containing tarred fuses and magnesium), tear gas, and toxic gas shells (with a small charge that ruptured the shell to release the gas). Other specialized shells included armor-piercing shells (type AL, with thick walls and base fuses), illuminating shells (ejecting a cylinder with a parachute that retained a flare cartridge), tracers, and even propaganda shells carrying leaflets.

==== Chemical Shells ====
The development of chemical weapons during World War I (1914–1918) spurred rapid innovation among belligerent nations, each adapting to the other's advancements. In October 1914, French infantry employed tear gas grenades loaded with ethyl bromoacetate to clear trenches and shelters. On October 27, 1914, German artillery fired 3,000 7.7 cm shells containing bromoacetone, a tear gas, at Neuve-Chapelle. The first large-scale toxic gas attack on the Western Front occurred on April 22, 1915, during the Second Battle of Ypres, when German troops released chlorine gas from cylinders, forming a yellow-green cloud that breached a three-kilometer stretch of trenches between Steenstrate and Langemark. French artillery losses included 29 90 mm cannons, 16 75 mm cannons, six 95 mm cannons, and four 120 mm L cannons, though the latter were recaptured on April 25.

Following the Ypres attack, French General Headquarters requested gas-capable equipment and projectiles by late April 1915. The first French chlorine gas attack occurred in July 1915. To improve precision and reduce reliance on wind-dependent gas clouds, all belligerents developed chemical artillery shells. The French introduced "Shell No. 1" in June 1915, a 75 mm explosive shell with an insulated interior filled with carbon tetrachloride, a suffocating agent. These were first fired on July 14, 1915, near Fricourt and in larger quantities during the Battle of Champagne in September 1915. Prisoner interrogations indicated limited effectiveness, with symptoms restricted to eye irritation and mild respiratory discomfort due to insufficient toxic concentration.

Subsequent French designs included Shell No. 2 (phosphorus and carbon disulfide, incendiary-suffocating) and Shell No. 3 (phosphorus, incendiary-smoke), both based on the 75 mm shell. In May 1916, Germany countered with diphosgene ("green cross") shells around Verdun. France responded with Shell No. 4 ("Vincennite"—hydrocyanic acid, arsenic chloride, chloroform, and tin chloride) and Shell No. 5 ("Collongite"—phosgene and arsenic chloride), developed in 1915 but deployed in 1916 at Verdun (February) and the Somme (July), respectively.

From 1917 to 1918, chemical shell use intensified. In July 1917, Germany introduced cyanodiphenyl arsine ("blue cross"), inducing vomiting, and ethyl dichloride sulfide ("yellow cross"), a vesicant known as mustard gas or yperite after its use near Ypres. On October 15, 1917, French artillery conducted a week-long phosgene shell bombardment before the Chemin des Dames offensive. By 1918, French shells included No. 7 (chloropicrin, a lethal suffocating tear gas), No. 16 ("rationite," an immediately lethal vesicant), and No. 20 (yperite), introduced in June 1918.

Between July 1915 and November 1918, the French Chemical Materials Service produced 18.2 million special shells across calibers (75, 90, 105, 120, and 155 mm, plus trench mortar bombs), including 9.2 million Shells No. 4 and No. 5, 4.4 million smoke shells, 2.3 million mustard gas shells, and 870,000 tear gas shells, alongside 1.14 million suffocating grenades. German forces recorded 200,000 gas-related casualties, with 9,000 deaths, while French forces reported 190,000 cases, including 8,000 fatalities.

It is undoubtedly one of the most extraordinary feats ever witnessed: improvising an industry from scratch without personnel, raw materials, or even manufacturing experience. Within a few months, laboratory processes had to be transformed into industrial methods.

— Alexandre Millerand, French Minister of War from August 1914 to October 1915, on the French chemical industry.

=== Production problems ===
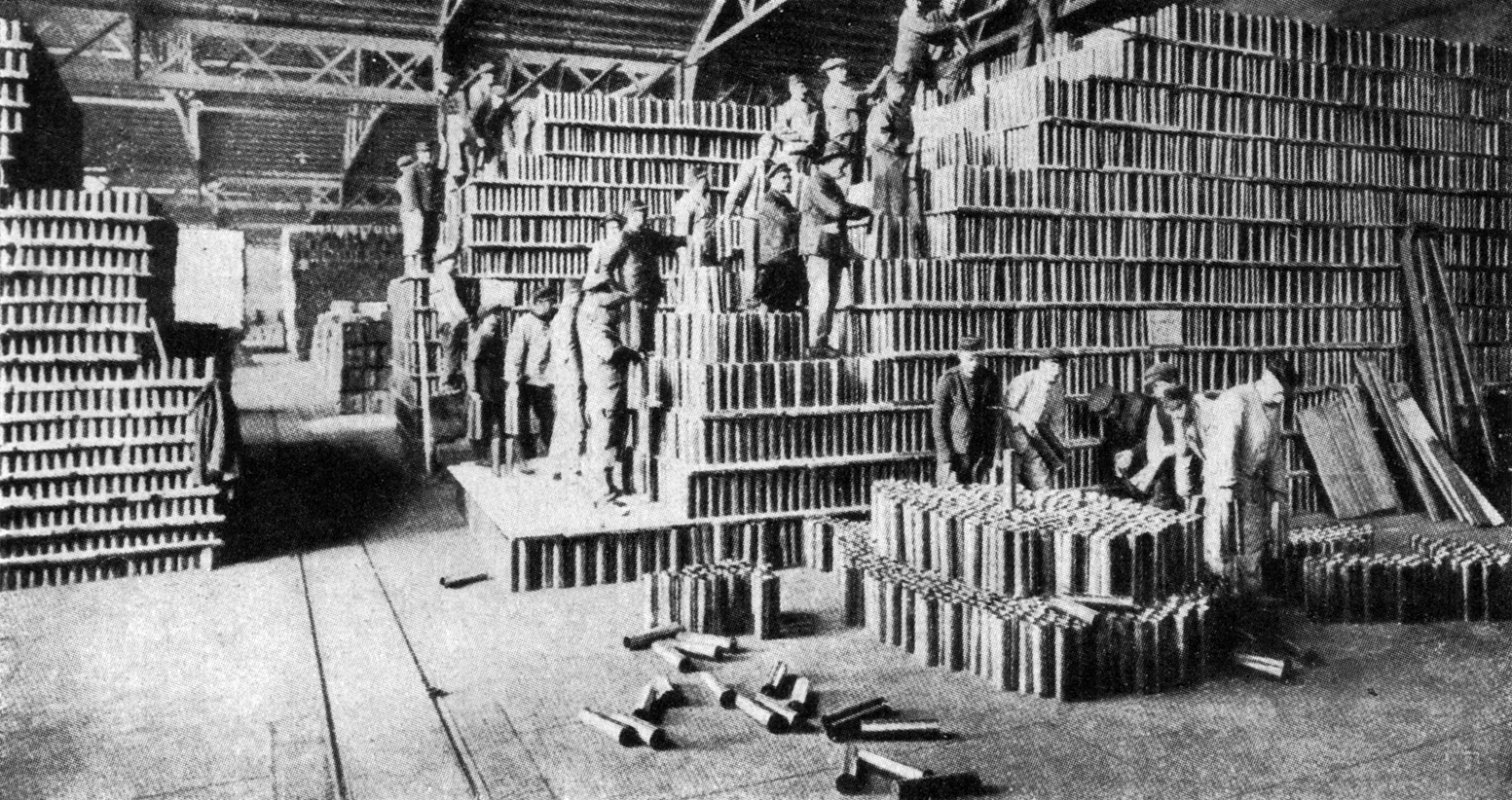
Storage of 75 mm cartridge cases: made from brass, it was necessary to import to meet needs, hence their recovery after use and the use of canvas cartridge cases for the propellant charge of large calibers.

When the French Ministry of War ordered mass production of artillery shells in 1914, shortages emerged in raw materials (steel, copper, explosives, and powders), machine tools, factories, and personnel. The German occupation of northeastern industrial regions compounded the issue, reducing France's steel production by 63% and pig iron output by 81%. Pre-war reliance on German suppliers further strained resources, though some German-owned factories in France were seized.

As stockpiles dwindled, steel was substituted with cast steel, notably in FA shells made from "gray cast iron" with lower carbon content, which was less costly and easier to mold. Explosive formulations shifted in October 1914 from cresylite (trinitrocresol) to alternatives like Schneidrite (ammonium nitrate and dinitronaphthalene), tolite (trinitrotoluene), melinite (trinitrophenol), xylite (trinitrometaxylene), and cheddite. Powder B, a propellant, was partially sourced from the United States, while phenol was derived from coal gas. Industrial production of ether, nitrocellulose, and sulfuric acid began, though the chemical industry, partly relocated to southwestern cities like Angoulême, Bassens, Toulouse, Saint-Médard, and Bergerac, depended on Chilean sodium nitrate and Norwegian ammonium nitrate.

The armaments workforce included military personnel reassigned to production ("special assignees," totaling 500,000 by 1918), women (430,000 "munitionettes" by war's end, often former textile workers), and civilian laborers. Additional labor came from adolescents, foreign workers (including Chinese recruits), colonial workers (primarily Algerians, Indochinese, Moroccans, and Tunisians), voluntary prisoners of war, and individuals with disabilities.

Projectile Production in France by Year (excluding imports)
1914	1915	1916	1917	1918
3,396,000	24,152,000	80,319,000	101,341,000	70,588,000

==== Logistical Challenges ====
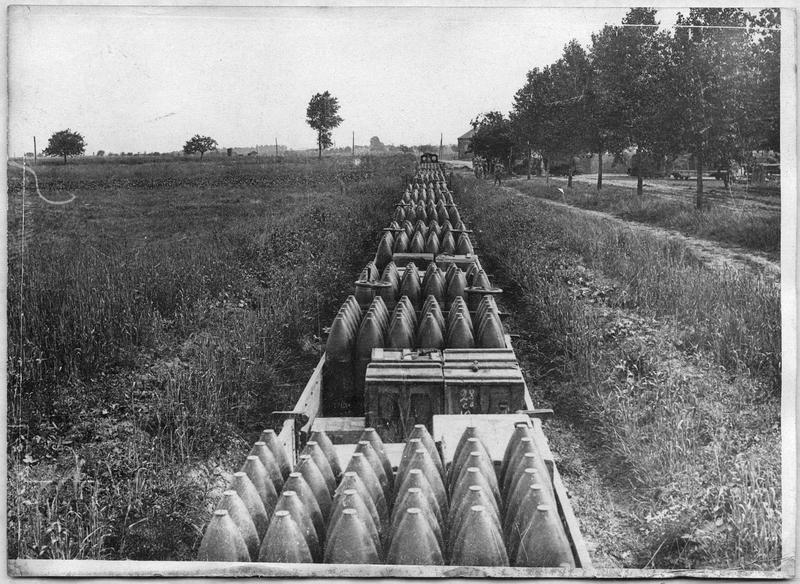
Convoy of 220 mm shells (each weighing 100 kg) on narrow gauge near the Quesnel station in August 1916.

The high demand for artillery ammunition during World War I necessitated a robust logistical system. By 1915, the responsibility for maintaining sufficient ammunition reserves shifted from rear command to the 1st Bureau of the General Headquarters (GQG) to support sustained offensives. Factories shipped cartridges and components to general reserve (GR) depots in rear cities such as Besançon, Lyon, Clermont, Bourges, Angers, Rennes, and Nevers. In August and September 1915, these depots were expanded with additional warehouses and railway lines, and new facilities were established at Héricy (for 75 mm and 105 mm ammunition), Cosne (for trench artillery), and Vincennes (for "special" shells). Each depot was linked to an army by at least one railway line, with a minimum of four trains operating daily.

Ammunition trains typically comprised 30 to 35 wagons, with a capacity of 300 to 350 tons. Armies maintained reserves in "mobile stockpiles"—fully loaded trains stationed on sidings. By August 1915, rail parks at Vaivre (under the GR of Gray), Brienne (GR of Troyes), Noisy-le-Sec, Le Bourget, Creil, and Dunkirk collectively held 3,440 wagons. Additional reserves were drawn from fortresses, partially utilized by nearby armies.

During preparations for the Champagne offensive (September–October 1915), rear services expanded railway and road networks and stockpiled supplies throughout August. In the event of a breakthrough, automobile convoys were organized to transport ammunition from rail terminals to horse-drawn units supporting corps and armies.

The rail park northeast of Brienne, on the Jessains-Éclaron line, featured a yard with twenty sidings for mobile stockpiles (initially 800 wagons, later increased to 1,000) and six warehouses (each 200 meters by 16 meters, rail-connected, storing approximately 700,000 75 mm rounds and 200,000 heavy shells). Security included earthwork barriers, hand pumps, and motorized pumps, with handling by two Grand Park detachments and protection from a territorial company and cavalry squadron; anti-aircraft guns and searchlights were added by mid-1916.

Further forward, stations at Saint-Dizier, Résigny, and Châlons served as sidings for additional mobile stockpiles (100–200 wagons each). Near the front, the Suippes-Sainte-Menehould line was upgraded to double-track, and a new 33.8 km line was built six kilometers south between Cuperly and Dampierre to enhance supply flow.

French Ammunition Deliveries During the 1915–1916 Offensives
Caliber	Artois and Champagne (August–October 1915)	for the defense of Verdun (February–July 1916)	for the Somme (May–October 1916)
58 mm trench	0	13,598	653,968
75 mm trench	239,350	0	196,000
150 mm trench	0	0	98,780
240 mm trench	1,950	1,220	36,430
65 mm	9,648	55,476	0
75 mm	5,497,920	12,513,744	17,378,208
75 mm gas	460,000	180,000	1,329,000
80 mm	39,700	103,500	13,400
90 mm	285,800	368,800	290,500
95 mm	104,700	556,000	740,800
100 mm	8,400	33,100	33,600
105 mm	112,200	508,000	415,500
120 mm	430,500	1,361,200	902,900
120 mm gas	0	5,200	88,200
155 mm	535,000	1,425,200	2,310,000
155 mm gas	0	0	269,000
220 mm	75,460	55,120	360,390
270 mm	9,900	700	24,150
Number of wagons required (average per day)	13,297 (200 per day)	27,671 (211 per day)	46,483 (Note: Not including the 1,829 ALGP wagons, loaded with 88,651 shells of caliber 240 to 400 mm.) (263 per day)

=== New Organizations ===
During World War I, the French artillery expanded significantly, growing from 434,000 personnel in August 1914 (16% of the total army) to 771,000 by 1918 (26% of the total), excluding logistical units tasked with ammunition transport. Recruitment for artillery units encountered fewer difficulties than for infantry, due to lower attrition rates. Personnel needs were met through foot artillery regiments, depots, and conscription of the 1914–1919 classes, with early call-ups for the latter beginning in April 1918. Recruits were drawn from all social classes, with urban individuals valued for technical skills (e.g., workers, mechanics, drivers) and rural recruits for horse-related roles (e.g., drivers, cart handlers, blacksmiths) to manage the thousands of horses required.

Starting in January 1915, Army command addressed officer losses and the demand for trained leaders in newly established heavy and field artillery regiments. Between January 1915 and December 1917, the commanding general directly appointed 6,000 officers. Non-commissioned officers (NCOs) with at least ten months of rank and twelve months of active service were selected by superiors for advanced training at the Fontainebleau school, yielding 4,000 sub-lieutenants and 800 trench artillery specialists across 14 cohorts during this period. Separately, NCOs with less than eight months of seniority, chosen by the High Command, attended candidate courses without entry exams, alongside conscripts from new classes who scored at least 12 on a general knowledge test. This process produced 3,500 NCOs and 5,000 conscripts who attained the rank of aspirant cadet.

==== Creation of Units ====
To support the formation of new divisions (up to the 170th Infantry Division by December 1916) and army corps (up to the 40th Corps in the same period), French artillery resources were reorganized. This involved regrouping the fourth groups from existing corps artillery regiments, transferring 75 mm batteries from colonial territories, and forming batteries from stockpiles of older 80 mm and 90 mm Model 1877 guns (Bange system). By April 1, 1917, these groups were consolidated into new Field Artillery Regiments (RAC), numbered 201 to 276.

The field heavy artillery expanded during the winter of 1914–1915 and was restructured on October 1, 1915, into 20 Horse-Drawn Heavy Artillery Regiments (RALH, nos. 101 to 121) and five Motorized Heavy Artillery Regiments (RALT, nos. 81 to 85), increased to ten (nos. 81 to 90) by November 1, 1915. These regiments served administrative purposes rather than tactical roles. RALH regiments, with 20 batteries each, supplied corps and army heavy artillery groups (two batteries per group), while RALT regiments, planned for 24 batteries each but limited by production delays, functioned as a mobile reserve, initially assigned to armies and later to the General Artillery Reserve.

On May 30, 1916, RALH regiments expanded to 36 batteries each to equip divisional heavy artillery groups with the 155 mm C gun, introduced gradually through summer 1918. An order on October 1, 1917, doubled RALT regiments from 10 to 20 (nos. 281 to 290, with 289 and 290 formed in early 1918) without increasing artillery groups. Similarly, on December 28, 1917, RALH regiments grew from 20 to 32 (nos. 130 to 145, with some numbers skipped) to provide each corps with an organic artillery regiment. In February 1918, four groups were detached from each RALH regiment for the General Reserve, forming 30 new RALH regiments (nos. 301 to 456, calculated by adding 200 to the original regiment number).

In 1917, infantry divisions were reorganized: brigades were eliminated, infantry regiments reduced from four to three per division, and divisional artillery was strengthened. A Horse-Drawn Heavy Artillery Group with 155 mm C guns, standardized by a July 12, 1917 decision and fully implemented by summer 1918, was added, along with a trench battery to the divisional Field Artillery Regiment (equipped with 75 mm guns). At the corps level, units included a Mounted Field Artillery Regiment (progressively motorized as RAC regiments with truck-mounted 75 mm guns) and മtwo artillery groups (each with two batteries) from a Heavy Artillery Regiment, armed with 105 mm and 155 mm L guns, often supplemented by older 120 mm L guns.

==== General Reserve of Artillery ====
On June 28, 1915, the "high-power artillery" (ALGP) was established, consolidating units equipped with large-caliber naval and coastal guns, including heavy artillery on railway tracks (ALVF). Following the battles of 1915 and 1916, General Buat, an artillery officer, proposed a reserve to enable concentrated firepower, termed an "artillery maneuver." Supported by General Nivelle, the new commander-in-chief and fellow artillery officer, the "General Reserve of Heavy Artillery" was formed in January 1917 and formalized by a note on February 14, 1917. This reserve, under direct control of the General Headquarters (GQG), included a staff (initially led by Buat, succeeded by General Herr in 1918), groups with the largest-caliber guns, a maintenance and training center at Mailly, aviation squadrons for observation and targeting, and transport services (e.g., standard track constructor groups, material depots, a driver and mechanic school in Langres, and an automotive service). It was structured into three divisions:

- The first division brought together the ALGP (including ALVF).
- The second division included tractor-drawn artillery.
- The third division consisted of units manned by naval gunners.

On January 26, 1918, the reserve was renamed the "General Reserve of Artillery" (RGA), encompassing all artillery units outside the organic structure of larger formations. It included 3,200 towed field artillery pieces, 4,480 towed or horse-drawn heavy artillery pieces, and 200 ALGP pieces. With the addition of foot and trench artillery groups, a fourth division was created, resulting in the following organization:

- The 1st Division, under Colonel (later General, Maurin), included ALGP and ALVF, with regiments numbered 70 to 80.
- The 2nd Division consisted of tractor regiments (nos. 81–90 for long guns, nos. 281–290 for short guns), reinforced by caterpillar groups and, in 1918, horse-drawn regiments (nos. 101–118, 120, 121, 130–138, 141, 142).
- The 3rd Division, led by a rear admiral, comprised naval gunners operating tractor-drawn batteries and an armed flotilla (gunboats and barges on river networks).
- The 4th Division included foot artillery regiments (1st, 3rd, 5th–11th), foot batteries from the 1st, 2nd, and 3rd colonial artillery regiments, and trench artillery regiments (nos. 175–178).

In June 1918, a 5th Division was added, formed from mounted field artillery regiments detached from army corps. Equipment replacement was managed by armies for the 2nd and 4th divisions and by the RGA for the 1st and 3rd divisions. In January 1918, a general inspection of artillery was established, led by a division general, to oversee training across armies and direct the RGA.

==== New uniform ====
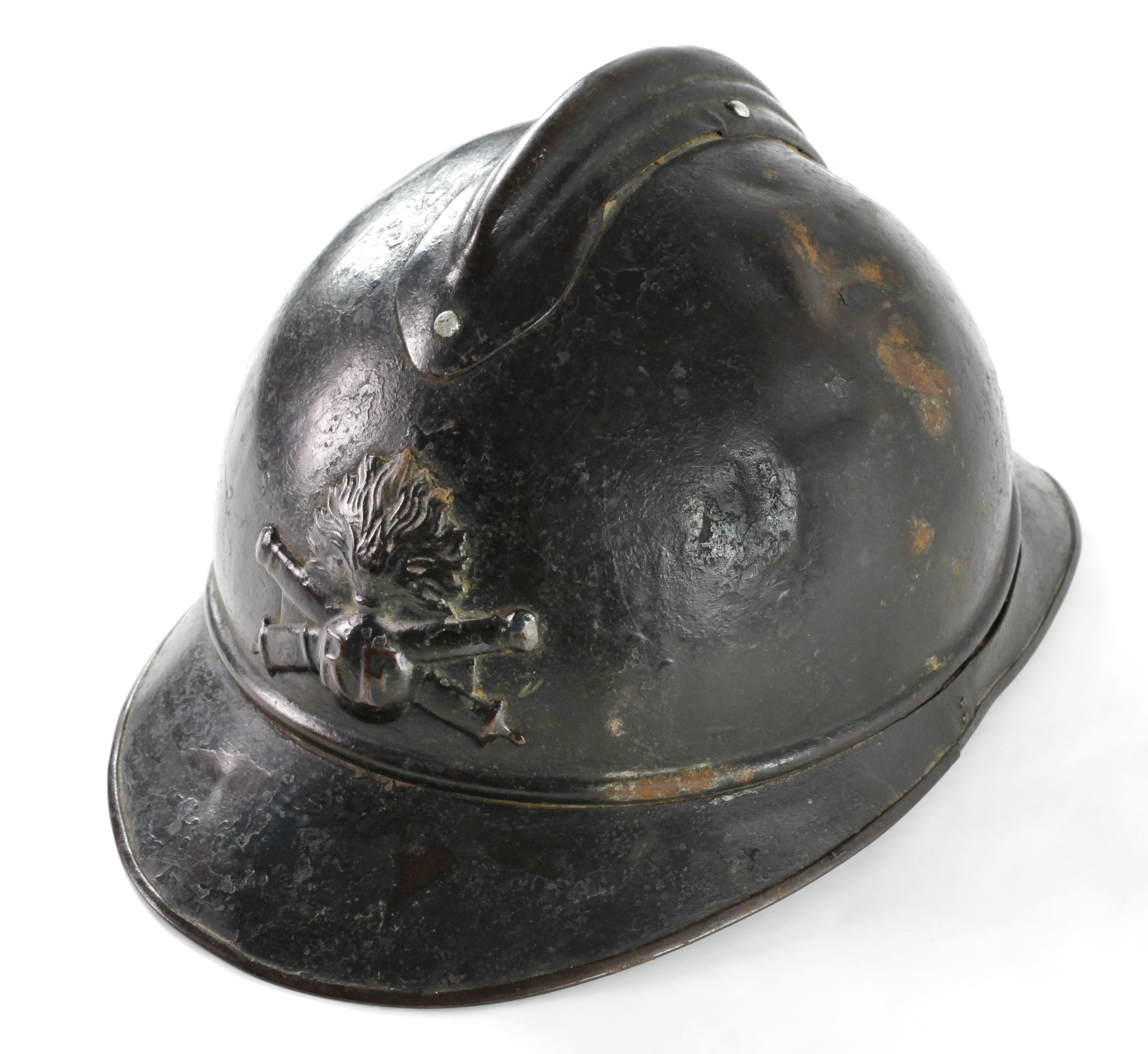
The artillery helmet model 1915: two crossed cannons under a flaming grenade with the initials RF.

The French artillery uniform, colloquially termed "artiflot," evolved during World War I alongside other military branches. In 1915, it transitioned to horizon blue woolen fabric dyed with indigo, accompanied by the adoption of the Adrian helmet (0.7 mm thick, initially coated with "artillery gray" varnish, shifting to matte gray in 1916). Distinctive artillery features persisted: scarlet red collar insignia and trouser piping, with the helmet displaying two crossed cannons on the front.

For practical use, artillerymen, tasked with prolonged harassment or preparatory fire and handling heavier ammunition and equipment, often wore fatigue dress instead of combat uniforms. This consisted of a canvas work shirt and linen drill pants. Early in the war, due to shortages of horizon blue fabric, non-regulation items such as brown, beige, or blue-gray corduroy clothing were incorporated, supplemented by civilian winter gear like scarves, sweaters, gloves, and hats.

=== New roles ===
Following challenges in breaching German lines during 1915, the French General Staff increased artillery and munitions stockpiles to support major offensives: the Second Battle of Champagne (fall 1915), the Battle of the Somme (summer 1916), and the Second Battle of the Aisne (spring 1917). This involved expanding artillery resources and adjusting their tactical employment. The adaptation process was incremental, informed by lessons from each offensive, though implementation faced delays due to resistance from some General Staff members, including certain artillery officers.

==== In 1915 ====
The French artillery doctrine evolved from practices tested in large units starting in fall 1914. Reports from these units were relayed up the chain of command, leading the General Staff to issue the Instruction on the Employment of Artillery on November 9, 1914, and the Note on the Role of Artillery in Attacks on February 14, 1915. The latter outlined four primary missions:

1. Preparation: Neutralize barbed wire and enemy trenches, with a planned density of one artillery piece per ten meters of front;
2. Barrages: Deliver fire 100–200 meters ahead and on the flanks of an attack to block counterattacks and reinforcements;
3. Destruction of flanking machine guns: Target machine guns over a 700–800-meter width on the attack's flanks;
4. Counter-battery fire: Suppress or destroy enemy artillery, aided by airplane or balloon observation.

From 1915, each corps and army established an artillery intelligence service (SRA) to collect data from land observation sections (SROT), sound ranging sections (SRS), captive balloons, and aviation squadrons (one per corps) for observation and targeting. Liaison officers coordinated with infantry, and each artillery regiment's colonel advised their general. Divisional and corps artillery were managed by a small staff, supported at the army level by a fire planning group from the Army Geographic Service (SGA) for mapping. Telephone networks linked batteries, staffs, airfields, and observation posts, while radio (TSF) or signals facilitated targeting communication.

Artillery plans were developed prior to attacks, as demonstrated in two cases. On February 15, 1915, the 5th Corps attacked Vauquois, Boureuilles, and Hill 263 with a two-hour preparation, including two ten-minute pauses to disrupt German infantry. Orders directed that, upon infantry advance, artillery would shift to barrages, extending fire to the second line and reserves to hinder counterattacks.

At the end of February 1915, the 21st Corps planned an attack toward Souchez, between Hill 140 (Lorette) and the Vimy Ridge, executed in May after initial delays. The plan involved a two-hour dawn preparation with 120 field guns (from AC 21, AD 43, 58, 92, and a 2nd CC group) and 106 heavy pieces from the 10th Army's northern grouping. Field batteries, positioned 1,600–4,000 meters from targets (averaging 2,600 meters), enabled accurate and extended fire, while heavy batteries, up to 6 km away, allocated half their strength to counter-battery tasks, supported by frontline observers and two aircraft.

The Champagne offensive of September 22–27, 1915, employed 872 heavy artillery pieces across a 35 km front (one per 40 meters) and one 75 mm gun per 33 meters, expending 300,000 heavy shells and 1.3 million 75 mm shells. This preparation captured the first German line but faltered before the intact second line, halting due to ammunition shortages.

==== In 1916 ====
Following the French offensives in spring and autumn 1915, analyses by Generals Foch on Artois and Pétain on Champagne were circulated during the quieter winter period. These findings informed two instructions: one on November 20, 1915, addressing heavy artillery use, and another on January 16, 1916, defining the purpose and conditions for a general offensive.

On February 21, 1916, the first day of the Battle of Verdun, German artillery employed a new tactic: a nine-hour preparation, shorter than the French three-day barrage at Champagne in 1915, despite greater intensity. This brevity surprised French command, whose older heavy artillery fired more slowly. Lessons from Verdun's initial phase were codified in the Instruction on the Use of Artillery in Defense on May 27, 1916, introducing the "counter-preparation offensive" (CPO). This involved firing on enemy trenches during their preparation phase, just before an attack, when starting positions were occupied. An enemy artillery increase could escalate into a duel, targeting opposing lines in a war of attrition.

During the Battle of the Somme, the 6th Army, under General Fayolle (an artillery officer), attacked along a 15 km front starting July 1, 1916, after a week-long preparation. Artillery reinforcement included 444 field guns, 360 trench mortars, 228 short cannons, 300 long heavy artillery pieces, and 56 mortars and 61 long guns from the ALGP. The new French 400 mm howitzers obliterated the fortified villages of Herbécourt, Estrées, and Belloy-en-Santerre. This enabled the infantry to capture the first German line, with reports from the 21st RIC noting effective destruction of defenses and trenches near Dompierre. However, the second German line, largely unaffected and beyond trench artillery range, stopped further advance. Ammunition expenditure from June 24 to July 10 totaled two million 75 mm shells and 500,000 heavy shells. The offensive proceeded with planned attacks on July 14, July 30, and September 3, requiring time between phases to reposition artillery over damaged terrain. German defenses in depth prevented a breakthrough.

==== In 1917 ====
The development of an interarms employment doctrine was assigned to the Artillery Studies Center (CEA), established on June 27, 1916, in Châlons-sur-Marne, while the Artillery School of Fontainebleau adjusted its training to prepare new officers. Lessons from the Somme informed the Instruction of December 16, 1916, which guided the Second Battle of the Aisne (Chemin des Dames) in April 1917. This offensive spanned a 40 km front, employing four million 75 mm shells and 1.2 million heavy shells from April 7 to April 17, with one 75 mm gun and one heavy gun per 20 meters of front. The operation faced challenges due to adverse weather, complicating fire adjustment, and rugged terrain, which hindered the 1,650 trench artillery pieces from supporting infantry advances.

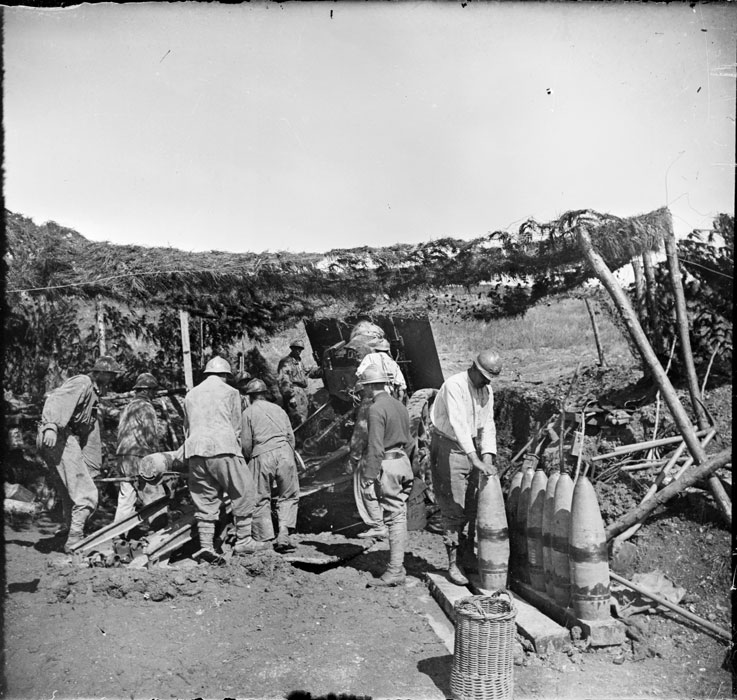
220 mm TR Schneider mortar on the Talou coast in August 1917: four gunners carry a shell (100 kg) to the open breech, while another primes a fuse.

In summer 1917, the 2nd Army conducted a limited offensive north of Verdun, on both sides of the Meuse, using concentrated artillery support. Approximately 600 batteries, totaling 2,256 pieces and manned by 60,000 artillerymen, supported 50,000 infantrymen (eight divisions) across an 18 km front, averaging one piece per eight meters. The deployment included: 1,195 75 mm guns for tactical support (one group per battalion); 1,016 trench mortars, 435 short 155 mm guns (160 Bange, 140 S, 135 CH), 122 220 mm mortars, and eight 270 mm mortars for fortification destruction; 16 100/105 mm guns, 50 105 mm guns, 140 120 mm Bange long guns, 24 145 mm guns, 250 155 mm Bange long guns, 55 155 mm long S guns, and eight 155 mm GPF guns for counter-battery fire; and approximately 100 ALGP guns (17 240 mm, 28 270 mm, 16 32 cm, four 370 mm, and four 400 mm) targeting railway stations, ammunition depots, and tunnels like Mort-Homme and Bois des Corbeaux. This setup, representing about one-third of French heavy artillery, required five weeks to prepare. Bombardment began on August 13, intensified on August 19–20, and continued until August 23, expending 3.5 million rounds (including 311,000 chemical shells) and 82,400 tons of ammunition over eleven days.

==== Use of gas ====
French doctrine on gas shells evolved with the introduction of new chemical agents, serving two primary purposes: destructive fire to eliminate occupants of targeted areas or neutralization fire to disrupt zones. Effectiveness depended on weather conditions, particularly wind speed, with temperature, humidity, and solar radiation as secondary factors. Winds exceeding 3 m/s dispersed gases too quickly for lethal concentrations, limiting use to neutralization.

Initial destructive fire, aimed at clearing trenches, occurred in July 1915 in Champagne using early gas shells. Low toxicity prevented lethal outcomes. Phosgene, introduced in May 1916, enabled destructive fire against small targets like batteries, trench sections, shelters, or supply points. This involved rapid barrages—200–500 75 mm rounds, 50–100 155 mm rounds, or 20–50 58 mm mortar rounds—delivered in two to five minutes, the time required for a trained soldier to don a gas mask.

In 1916, toxic shells were employed for neutralization fire, insufficient for lethal concentrations but compelling enemies to wear masks. These sustained barrages, lasting four to twelve hours, used fewer rounds to restrict movement and disrupt operations. Neutralizing a 100-meter front required approximately 500 75 mm shells, 250 120 mm shells, or 200 155 mm shells, often alternated with explosive shell barrages for enhanced effect.

Tear gas shells, used in 1916 for area coverage, had persistent effects, with a 75 mm shell affecting 5 m² and a 155 mm shell covering 50 m². Mustard gas, introduced in June 1918, altered area fire tactics. Affecting the respiratory system and skin, it contaminated zones for weeks. Defensively, mustard gas shells blocked enemy advances; offensively, they targeted German batteries or adjacent areas to render them unusable without decontamination, while flanking fire or crossroad barrages limited reinforcements.

==== Protection ====
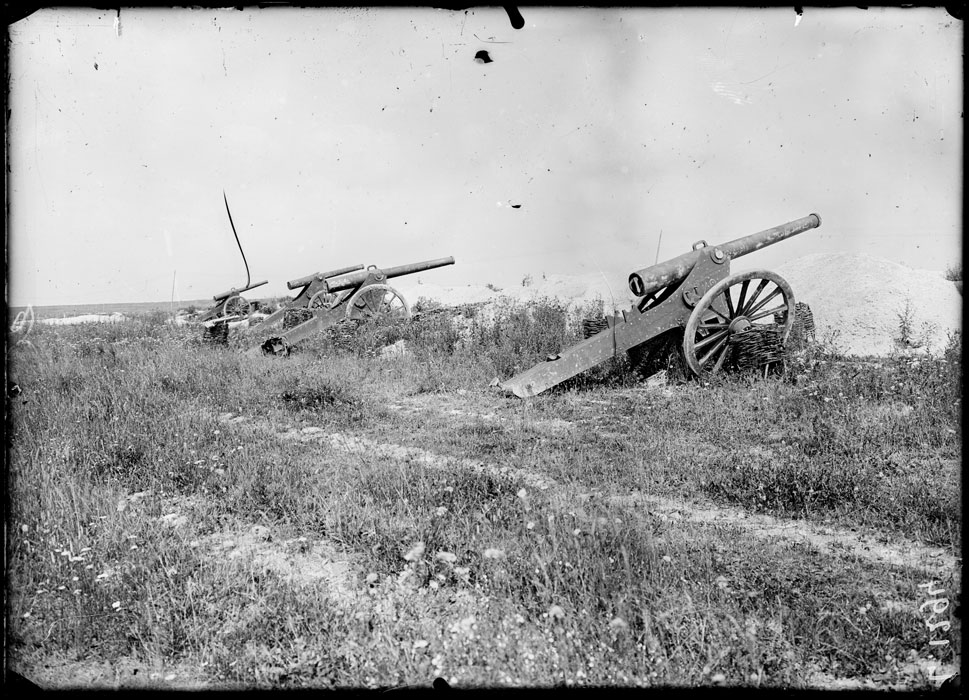
Four dummy 155 mm wooden cannons, in battery near the Wacques farm during the summer of 1916.

The adoption of powder B, a smokeless propellant invented in the late 19th century, reduced the visibility of artillery compared to black powder. At the war's outset, older equipment was painted matte olive green to minimize reflection, while newer pieces were coated in pearl gray, termed "artillery gray," per a December 21, 1896 decision initially aimed at reducing heat absorption in ammunition boxes exposed to sunlight.

With the shift to trench warfare, camouflage techniques emerged. In October 1914, gunners from the 6th Heavy Artillery Regiment began individually concealing their pieces. On February 12, 1915, the Ministry of War established a camouflage unit led by Guirand de Scevola, a mobilized artist in the foot artillery, staffed by non-mobilized painters and decorators. To counter aerial observation, artillery was painted with irregular patches in colors like yellow ochre, rust brown, sienna red, dark green, and black to blend with the environment and disrupt outlines. Factory-produced equipment reverted to olive green, with additional camouflage applied by army painters. Alternative methods included multicolored cloths, netting, or branches.

To withstand enemy artillery fire, positions were modified. Shelters or trenches were dug beside firing platforms, guns were partially buried in pits (sometimes with shelter traverses), or placed in casemates with roofs of logs or railway tracks. In fortified areas like Dunkirk and Verdun, concrete reinforcement was used. Dummy wooden cannons were also deployed to draw counter-battery fire or simulate heavy artillery presence along the front.

== The peak ==
By the end of 1918, French artillery reached its maximum in personnel and gun numbers, though signs of material decline emerged, particularly among long guns. Barrel wear, caused by high initial velocities and continuous use across all major engagements, outpaced industrial replacement capacity. For instance, 155 mm GPF guns experienced losses of 30 pieces per month due to wear. Meanwhile, 100 mm guns were returned to factories for reboring to 105 mm, and 145 mm guns were similarly converted to 155 mm. During this process, affected batteries relied on older 155 mm L Model 1877 cannons as replacements. In the high-power artillery (ALGP), wear necessitated adjustments: 305mm Model 1893/96 guns were rebored to 320 mm (designated Model 1917), and 274mm Model 1893/96 to 285 mm, with one instance of a second reboring to 288 mm. Re-tubing to smaller calibers, which increased pressure tolerance, was implemented late in the war for eight 24/19 cm G cannons.

=== Final adjustments ===
==== Specialized artillery ====
Before World War I, the 1902 Charron-Girardot & Voigt armored vehicle prompted early anti-tank concepts. On September 6, 1914, Captain Lesieure Desbrières proposed armored autocannons (AC) to counter enemy armored cars (AM), a plan approved by Paris Governor Joseph Galliéni. The first section formed on September 19, 1914, in Vincennes, utilizing 37 mm Model 1885 or 1902 TR (rapid-fire) naval guns mounted on vehicles like Peugeot 146s (18-horsepower engines). By early 1915, a group of four autocannons with 47mm TR Model 1902 naval guns on Renault truck chassis was established. Assigned to cavalry units but operated by naval personnel, these mixed groups of armored cars and autocannons, dubbed "torpedo trucks," continued until February 1916.

In August 1914, Colonel Estienne, an artillery officer, suggested that victory depended on mounting a 75 mm gun on an off-road-capable vehicle to support infantry by breaching barbed wire and neutralizing machine guns. Research began in 1915, led by engineer Eugène Brillié of Schneider and Jules-Louis Breton, a deputy and later undersecretary for inventions, focusing on Holt caterpillar tractors from California. On January 31, 1916, General Joffre, after consulting Estienne, directed the Artillery and Munitions Undersecretariat to order "land battleships"—armored caterpillar tractors with 75 mm guns.

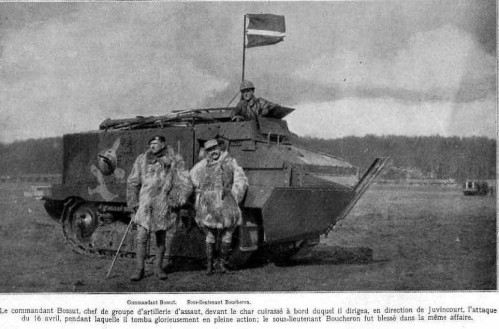
Squadron Leader Louis Bossut (a former dragoon) in front of his Schneider tank, the Trompe la Mort. On April 16, 1917, at the head of his armored group, he died burned after having passed the second German line.

Following 1916 tests by the Automotive Technical Service, two tank models were developed and ordered in batches of 400: the Schneider CA1 and the Saint-Chamond. Concurrently, the British Landships Committee and Mark I tank, deploying 49 units on September 15, 1916, at Flers. Terrain and mechanical issues limited success, with only 25 advancing and nine reaching German trenches before being repelled by artillery.

On September 30, 1916, the French "special artillery" (AS) was formalized under Brigadier General Estienne, who outlined assault artillery tactics on October 9. The vehicles equipped the 80th, 81st, and 82nd batteries of the 81st Heavy Artillery Regiment, staffed by volunteers trained at Champlieu camp in Compiègne Forest. Their combat debut occurred during the Second Battle of the Aisne: Schneider CA1 tanks attacked on April 16, 1917, at Juvincourt, followed by Saint-Chamond tanks on May 5 at Laffaux Mill. Of 128 Schneider tanks deployed, 52 were hit by German artillery (15 by direct fire), 35 caught fire due to unprotected fuel tanks, and 21 broke down or bogged down in mud.

By late 1916, anticipating German armored vehicles on the Western Front, the French Army initiated anti-tank defenses using the 37 mm Model 1916 TR infantry gun and the 75 mm Model 1897 artillery gun. The latter, when mounted on a firing platform, allowed a 60° azimuth adjustment and could fire the 1910 marine explosive shell for direct fire. By December 1917, 35 anti-tank batteries, all under the 176th Trench Artillery Regiment, were deployed along the front.

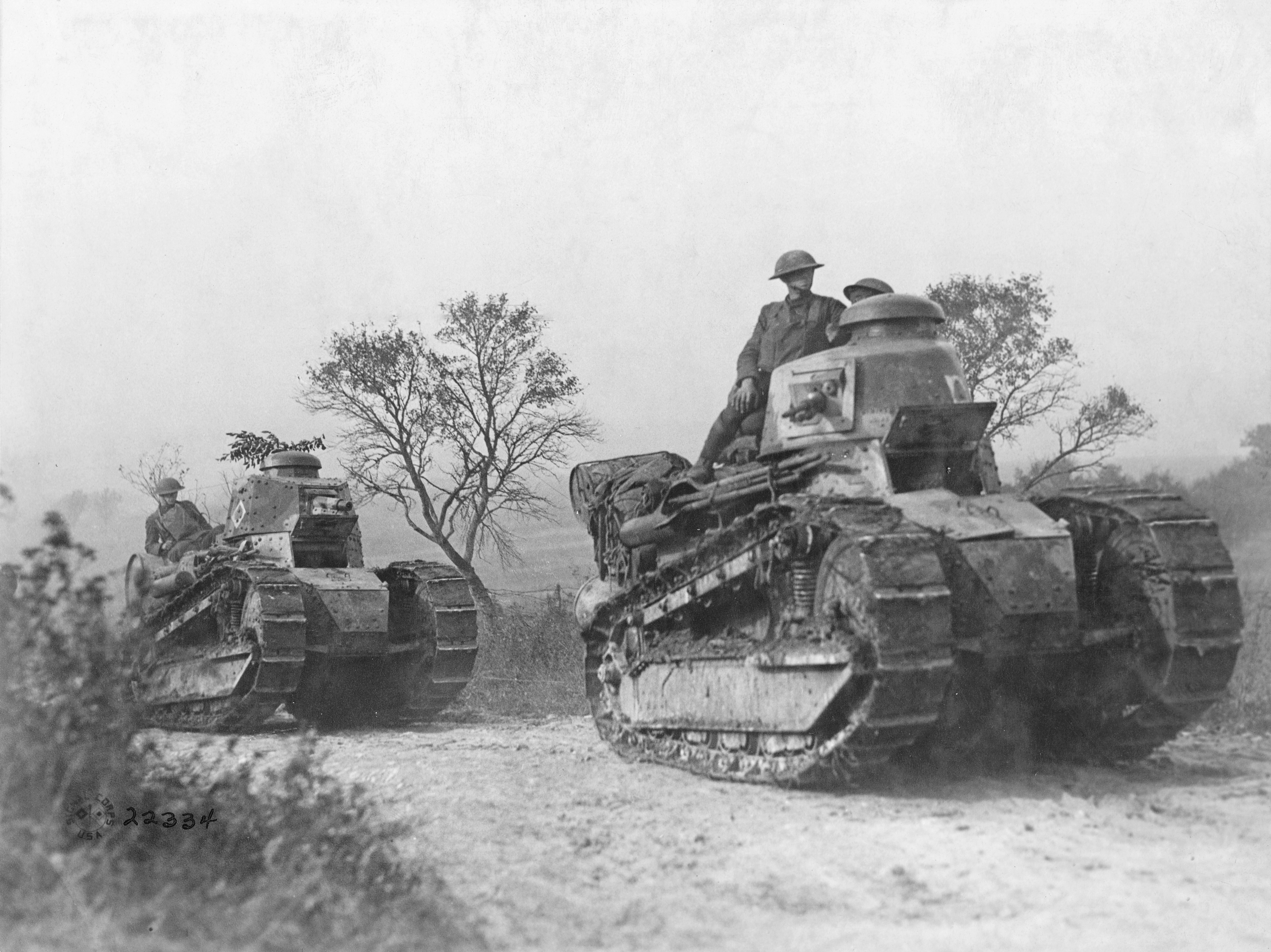
Renault FT tanks entrusted to American troops, going to the front on September 26, 1918.

In July 1916, General Estienne persuaded the General Staff and industrialists, including Louis Renault, to develop a lighter, faster tank with reduced armament. On February 22, 1917, an order for 150 Renault FT Model 1917 tanks was placed, expanded to 1,000 by April 9 after initial tests. Weighing 6.7 tons, the tank featured a single turret-mounted weapon—either a Hotchkiss Model 1914 machine gun or a 37 mm SA 1918 cannon (semi-automatic)—with mass production starting late 1917. The Renault FT first saw combat on May 31, 1918, at Saint-Pierre-Aigle during the Third Battle of the Aisne.

Additional tank designs were explored: FCM proposed a 40-ton model with a 105 mm or 75 mm turret-mounted cannon; Peugeot developed an 8-ton prototype; and British Mark V* tanks (26 tons) were acquired. A "breakthrough tank" was ordered in 1918 for 1919 delivery, with 300 units planned. Named the FCM 2C, weighing 69 tons and armed with four machine guns and a 75 mm cannon, only ten were completed post-war.

==== Anti-aircraft artillery ====
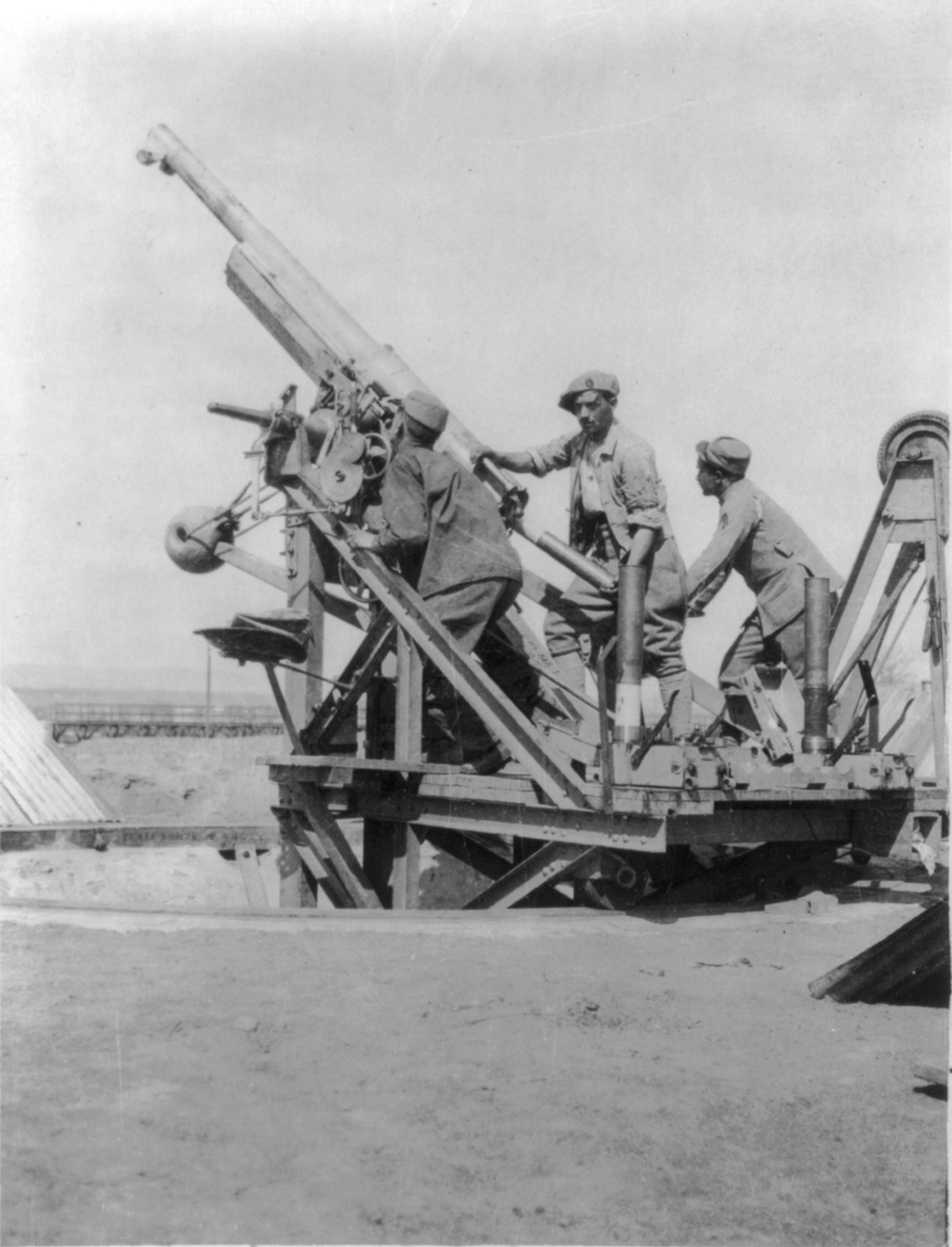
75 mm anti-aircraft gun mounted on a model 1915 platform, protecting the French Army of the Orient around Thessaloniki.

French anti-aircraft artillery (AAA, later termed "aircraft defense") expanded during World War I, utilizing 75 mm De Dion-Bouton autocannons Model 1913 (85° elevation), 75 mm guns on platforms Models 1915 and 1917 (up to 75° elevation, with a specialized 1917 AAA shell), 75 mm guns on trailers, and fixed 105 mm guns. By 1918, the arsenal included 760 75 mm anti-aircraft guns and 70 105 mm guns, credited with 218 aircraft shootdowns that year. Initial velocities, however, were increasingly inadequate as aircraft flew faster and higher, and units often relied on injured soldiers and territorial personnel.

AAA units were distributed across individual positions (one gun) and sections (two guns). In September 1916, most were administratively assigned to the 62nd RAC, except those at Paris fortified camp forts, which stayed under the 12th RAC. In September 1917, three anti-aircraft regiments (RADCA) were formed for administrative purposes, without tactical roles: the 63rd for army defense, the 64th for Paris, and the 65th for rear areas outside Paris. In August 1918, rising personnel numbers led to the 63rd RADCA splitting into the new 63rd (fixed 75 mm guns), 66th (mobile 75 mm guns), and 166th (105 mm guns). These regiments incorporated machine gun detachments, searchlights, and observation balloons. In 1919, they were reorganized and detached from the artillery branch.

==== Breaking through by surprise ====
The German offensives of the second half of 1917 (Riga in August and Caporetto in October) and the beginning of 1918 (the Spring Offensive on the Somme in March, the Lys in April, the Aisne in May, the Matz in June, and Champagne in July) featured shorter artillery preparations—lasting a few hours rather than days—with increased intensity from rapid-fire guns and extensive gas shell use. These attacks isolated sectors to prevent support from adjacent areas and employed infantry infiltrations following rolling barrages, a tactic refined by Colonel Georg Bruchmüller under General von Hutier. The British also used surprise at Cambrai in November 1917, breaching the Hindenburg Line with tanks.

French artillery adopted similar methods, formalized in the Instruction of November 19, 1917, on Artillery Fire. Battery positioning occurred at night, adjustments relied on maps without spotting fire, and telephone use was avoided to preserve surprise. Preparations were reduced to as little as one hour, with rolling barrages 200 meters ahead of infantry. Destruction fire was largely replaced by neutralization fire, often using gas, including for counter-battery roles. After breaching the first line, some artillery, such as trench mortars, advanced to support the assault, aided by the brief preparation's limited terrain disruption.

Enhanced mobility, driven by trucks and tractors since late 1916 to offset horse shortages, involved about a quarter of French batteries. This allowed rapid resource concentration and surprise, contributing to halting German advances in spring and summer 1918. It also supported the Allied "Hundred Days Offensive") in 1918, involving British and American forces across multiple rapid strikes. German artillery, constrained by horse shortages from 1917, depended on railways, reducing its flexibility compared to the French, who utilized approximately 80,000 vehicles by 1918. General Ludendorff later noted in his memoirs that "the French victory of 1918 was the victory of the French truck over the German railway."

Marching Speeds
Rolling	Traction	Average Speed in Convoy	Average Distance per Day
Iron-Rimmed Wooden Wheels	Heavy Battery Mounted	5 km/h	20 to 40 km
Iron-Rimmed Wooden Wheels	Light Battery Mounted	5 (at a walk) to 7 km/h	20 to 40 km
Iron-Rimmed Wooden Wheels	Horse-Drawn Battery	5 to 8 km/h (alternating trot/walk)	25 to 50 km
Full Rubber Bandage	Heavy Battery Towed by Tractors	6 to 10 km/h	50 to 70 km
Full Rubber Bandage	Light Battery Carried by Trucks	10 to 15 km/h	70 to 100 km
Roller Train	Heavy or Light Batteries	15 to 20 km/h	150 to 200 km
Pneumatic	Heavy or Light Batteries	20 to 25 km/h	200 to 250 km

==== Self-Propelled Artillery ====
Observations from the offensives of 1915, 1916, and 1917 indicated that while infantry could capture initial enemy trench lines, advances often stalled at subsequent lines due to insufficient artillery support. Conventional artillery struggled to traverse shell-damaged terrain. Early responses included deploying mountain batteries with mules and using artillery tractors, followed by wheeled self-propelled guns and, later, tracked gun carriages. These tracked units, termed "exploitation artillery," were intended for a proposed 7th Division of the General Artillery Reserve (RGA) to support planned 1919 offensives.

Initial prototypes included 75 mm and 105 mm L guns on Renault FT chassis, though development prioritized heavier calibers. Plans emerged for tracked carriages to mount 130 155 mm GPF guns, 50 194 mm GPF guns (alongside 150 additional units on bifurcated carriages with tractors, matching the 155 mm GPF design), 20 220 mm L 1917 S guns, 75 220 mm TR CH guns, and 25 280 mm TR S guns. Only the tracked mounts for the 194 mm GPF gun and 280 mm TR mortar reached testing and limited production stages. Orders were scaled back on November 12, 1918, and later canceled, with only a few units completed.

Equipment	Weight in position	Rate of fire	max. range	Ammunition (weight)
194 mm GPF cannon on Saint-Chamond tracked carriage	28,000 kg	2 rounds/min	18 km	High-explosive shells (80.8 or 83 kg)
280 mm mortar on Saint-Chamond tracked carriage	28,000 kg	2.5 rounds/min	10.9 km	High-explosive shells (202 to 275 kg)

=== Status at the Armistice ===
As of November 11, 1918, French artillery consisted of 105 field artillery regiments (RAC) and 84 heavy artillery regiments (RAL), operating 4,968 75 mm guns, 5,128 heavy pieces, and 112 mountain guns along the front.

The 105 divisional artilleries (AD) included 105 RACs (numbered 1–62 and 200–280), each with three groups of three 75 mm batteries, and 105 divisional groups of 155 mm howitzers from RALH regiments (numbered 101–145). The 32 corps heavy artilleries (ALCA) each comprised a group of 105 mm long guns (or 120 mm L de Bange guns) and a group of 155 mm long guns, sourced from RALH regiments 101–145, including colonial regiments 141, 142, and 143.

The General Artillery Reserve (RGA) formed the primary maneuver force, encompassing: ten long-gun RALT regiments (81–90), ten short-gun RALT regiments (281–290), five RALH regiments with 105 mm guns (451–456), ten RALH regiments with 155 mm long guns (407–421), seventeen RALH regiments with 155 mm howitzers (301–345, including the 343rd Colonial), eight RALGP regiments for high-power artillery (ALGP; 71–78, with 72 in formation and 70 focused on standard-gauge railway construction), and five RAT regiments (175–179).

Additional units included three RAM regiments (1, 2, and 13th Colonial), ten colonial field artillery regiments (1, 2, 3, 21, 22, 23, 41, 42, 43, and the Moroccan Colonial Artillery Regiment), thirteen RAP regiments (151–161, plus 182nd and 183rd Colonial), two 60 cm railways regiments (68th for construction, 69th for operation), the 163rd spotting regiment (with SROT and SRS units), ten autonomous African groups (1–10), eight assault artillery regiments (501–508), six anti-aircraft artillery regiments (63–66, 166, and 67th for searchlights), 20 artillery squadrons, and 21 military transport squadrons. A fleet of approximately 20 gunboats, transferred to the Ministry of the Navy in November 1917, saw four rearmed in November 1918 for the Rhine flotilla. Coastal batteries had been returned to the Navy under decrees of September 21, 1917, and January 18, 1918.

=== German Artillery ===
By November 1918, German artillery included 243 divisional artillery units, each with one field regiment of nine batteries (four guns per battery), totaling 8,748 pieces. This was a reduction from the war's start, when regiments had twelve batteries of six guns each. Each division also had a mixed battalion with two batteries of 155 mm howitzers and one battery of 105 mm guns, totaling 2,700 pieces across all divisions. The 30 corps artillery units comprised two mixed battalions with two batteries of 210 mm mortars each and one battalion of 155 mm guns, totaling 480 pieces. Independent reserve regiments deployed 3,200 field pieces, 4,480 heavy guns, and 200 railway-mounted pieces. Divisions in active sectors could temporarily reinforce their artillery by reallocating units from quieter areas.

The German Army captured numerous French artillery pieces during the war. For 75 mm guns, they seized 447 in 1914 (including 36 from the 2nd Colonial Artillery Regiment at Rossignol on August 22), 26 in 1915, 14 in 1916, none in 1917, and 383 in 1918 (notably during the Chemin des Dames and Matz offensives). On September 8, 1914, they took 460 pieces, including heavy Bange guns, at the Maubeuge fortified camp. On May 27, 1918, abandoned ALGP heavy guns—immobile due to evacuation difficulties—were captured, including two 16 cm guns, six 19 cm guns, 14 240 mm guns, three 274 mm guns, one 305 mm gun, and four 340 mm guns. French forces, in turn, captured significant German artillery during the 1918 Allied offensives, with totals increased by the November 11, 1918, armistice, which mandated Germany surrender 5,000 guns (2,500 heavy and 2,500 field pieces) in operational condition.

=== After the Armistices ===
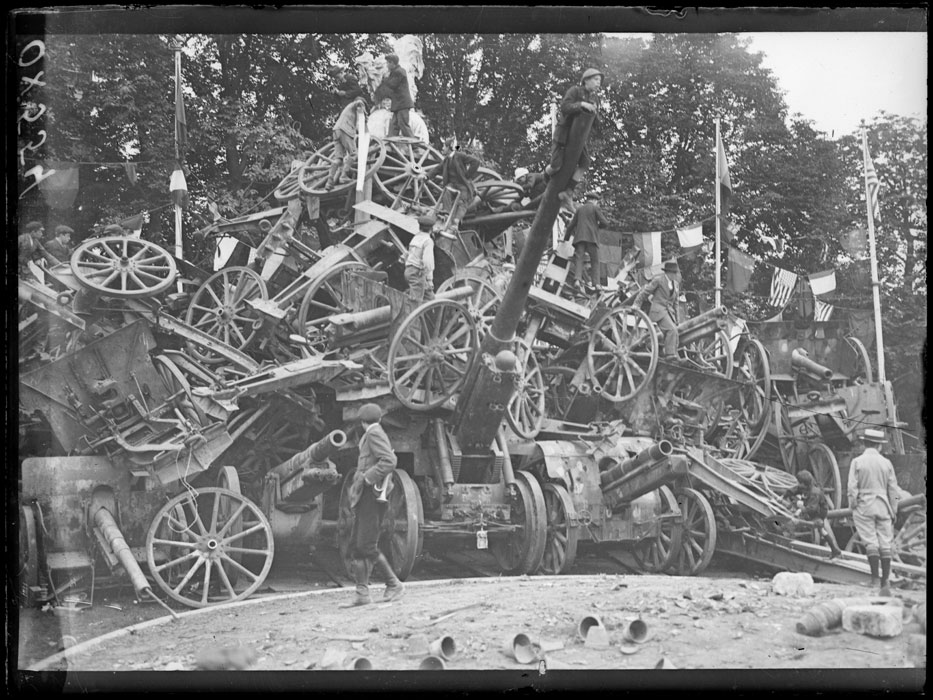
Trophies piled up on the Champs-Élysées roundabout in Paris for the "Victory Parade" on July 14, 1919. Under the terms of the armistice, the German Army had to hand over some of its artillery.

Following the peace treaties of 1919–1920, French artillery adjusted to peacetime conditions. Most trench artillery units were disbanded, and demobilization reduced personnel, leading to the gradual dissolution or consolidation of several field and heavy artillery regiments. The ALVF (Artillerie Lourde sur Voie Ferrée) was reorganized into a single regiment. Surplus equipment was stored in warehouses or left temporarily outdoors, while tanks were reassigned to the infantry on March 1, 1919.

Doctrinal updates were formalized in the Provisional Instruction on Artillery Service in the Field of June 15, 1919, which stated: "The power of fire is the predominant factor of success in modern battle. An attack on a position held by an enemy who has, until the last moment, well-targeted fire on the assault terrain, is unlikely to succeed." Tactically, emphasis shifted to brief artillery preparations, rolling barrages, and concentrated fire on key points ("maneuver by fire"). Operationally, priorities included maintaining a general artillery reserve and enhancing equipment mobility—via rail and road—for strategic mass maneuvers. Firepower requirements specified rapid-fire guns with wide fields and extended ranges: trench artillery up to 2.5 km, light artillery to 10 km, short-range heavy artillery from 10–15 km, long-range heavy artillery from 15–20 km, and ALGP (Artillerie Lourde à Grande Portée) beyond 20 km.

The French Army retained substantial stockpiles, including approximately ten million 75 mm shells, but budget cuts limited new development. Experimental models like the 145 mm GPF were tested in the 1920s but abandoned. Significant new equipment emerged only with the 1936 rearmament program, introducing the 105 mm Model 1936, 25 mm AA 1938, 75 mm TAZ 1939, 90 mm AA 1939, 25 mm AC 1937, and 47 mm AC 1937, alongside motorization upgrades such as the 75 mm 1897-1938 with TTT tires. Self-propelled artillery programs resumed, with emergency orders for the Sau 40 and ARL V 39 scheduled for delivery from October 1940. After June 1940, the German Army utilized captured French stocks on the Eastern Front and Atlantic Wall, while the Liberation Army relied on American-supplied matériel.

The former Western Front required extensive cleanup of unexploded ordnance. Recovery and defusing operations began as northeastern territories were reclaimed. The battlefield contained unexploded shells, metal fragments, chemical residues, equipment remnants, and human remains. French artillery fired approximately 300 million shells during the war; combined with German and British contributions, the total exceeded one billion, with around 200 million remaining unexploded, concentrated along the narrow trench warfare zone known in France as the "red zone."

Initial demining and infrastructure restoration allowed most of the red zone to resume agricultural use during the interwar period. However, the state acquired large sections for reforestation (e.g., around Verdun) or military training (e.g., Suippes camp), without deep soil decontamination. A century later, heavy metals such as lead from shrapnel and mercury from primers persist, and tap water in some areas still shows elevated perchlorate levels.

== See also ==
- Shell shock
- French cavalry during World War I

== Bibliography ==
=== Contemporary sources of the conflict ===
- Alvin, Pierre; André, Félix (1923). Les Canons de la Victoire: 5e édition du Manuel d'artillerie lourde [The Guns of Victory: Heavy Artillery Manual 5th Edition] (in French). Paris: Lavauzelle & Cie. p. 572.
- Aublet, Capitaine (1929). "L'artillerie française de 1914 à 1918" [French artillery from 1914 to 1918]. Revue militaire française (in French). 33: 356–357.
- Baquet, Louis (1921). Souvenirs d'un directeur de l'Artillerie [Memories of an Artillery Director] (in French). Paris: H. Charles-Lavauzelle. p. 187.
- de Saunier, Louis Baudry (1915). Oui !... mais le 75 arrose mieux: le fonctionnement complet du canon de 75 [Yes!... but the 75 waters better: the full functioning of the 75 cannon] (in French). Paris: Publications Omnia. p. 62.
- Challeat, Jules (1914). Artillerie de campagne: la manœuvre appliquée [Field artillery: the applied maneuver] (in French). Paris: Henri Charles-Lavauzelle. p. 248.
- Challéat, Jules (1935). L'artillerie de terre en France pendant un siècle: Histoire technique (1916–1919), t. 2 [Land artillery in France over a century: Technical history (1916–1919), vol. 2] (in French). Charles-Lavauzelle et Cie. p. 546.
- Boston Public Library (1915). Notre 75: Une merveille du génie français, par un artilleur [Our 75: A marvel of French engineering, by an artilleryman] (in French). Paris: Aristide Quillet. p. 53.
- Gascouin (1920). L'évolution de l'artillerie pendant la guerre [The evolution of artillery during the war] (in French). Paris: Flammarion. p. 287.
- Herr, Frédéric-Georges (1913). La Guerre des Balkans: quelques enseignements sur l'emploi de l'artillerie [The Balkan War: Some Lessons on the Use of Artillery] (in French). Paris: Berger-Levrault. p. 39.
- Herr, Frédéric-Georges (1923). L'Artillerie: ce qu'elle a été, ce qu'elle est, ce qu'elle doit être [Artillery: what it was, what it is, what it must be] (in French). Paris: Berger-Levrault. p. 344.
- Grand Quartier Général (1917). Bulletin de renseignement de l'artillerie: décembre 1917 [Artillery Intelligence Bulletin: December 1917] (in French). Vol. 3. Paris: Imprimerie nationale. p. 114.
- Grand Quartier Général (1918a). Bulletin de renseignement de l'artillerie: mars 1918 [Artillery Intelligence Bulletin: March 1918] (in French). Vol. 6. Paris: Imprimerie nationale. p. 123.
- Grand Quartier Général (1918b). Bulletin de renseignement de l'artillerie: avril-mai 1918 [Artillery Intelligence Bulletin: April–May 1918] (in French). Vol. 7. Paris: Imprimerie nationale. p. 122.
- Langlois, Hippolyte (1892). L'Artillerie de campagne en liaison avec les autres armes [Field Artillery in conjunction with other arms] (in French). L. Baudoin.
- Lepelletier, Louis-René-Victor (1919). Rapport de la sous-commission d'informations sur les enseignements à retirer de la guerre en matière de munitions d'artillerie [Report of the Subcommittee on Information on the Lessons to be Learned from the War on Artillery Ammunition] (in French). Commission centrale d'Artillerie de l'État-major de l'Armée. p. 176.
- Leroy, Capitaine (1922). Historique et organisation de l'artillerie: l'artillerie française depuis le 2 août 1914 [History and organization of artillery: French artillery since August 2, 1914] (in French). École militaire de l'Artillerie. p. 199.
- Lucas, Jean (1934). La D.C.A. (défense contre aéronefs), de ses origines au 11 novembre 1918 [The D.C.A. (defense against aircraft), from its origins to November 11, 1918] (in French). Paris: Baudinière. p. 478.
- Maitre, Colonel (1920). Évolution des idées concernant l'emploi de l'artillerie pendant la Guerre [Evolution of ideas concerning the use of artillery during the War] (in French). Paris: Centre d'études tactiques d'artillerie. p. 31.
- Menu, Lieutenant-colonel Ch. (1931). Applications de l'industrie, 1928-1931 [Industry applications, 1928-1931] (in French). École supérieure de guerre.
- Ministère de la Guerre (1913). Règlement provisoire de manœuvre de l'artillerie de campagne: approuvé par le ministre de la guerre le 8 septembre 1910: mis à jour au 1er octobre 1913 [Provisional regulations for the maneuver of field artillery: approved by the Minister of War on September 8, 1910: updated on October 1, 1913] (in French). Paris: Chapelot. p. 202.
- Ministère de la Guerre (1917b). Instruction sur le tir d'artillerie: Premier fascicule [Artillery Shooting Instruction: First Booklet] (in French). Paris: Imprimerie nationale. p. 209.
- Maurin, Colonel Louis (1932). Artillerie lourde sur voie ferrée [Heavy artillery on railway tracks] (in French). Centre d'études tactique d'artillerie.
- Rimailho, Lieutenant-colonel Émile (1924). Artillerie de campagne [Field artillery] (in French). Paris: Gauthier-Villars. p. 506.
- Tudesq, André (1914). Le Canon merveilleux: les mémoires d'un "75" [The Marvelous Canon: Memoirs of a "75"] (in French). Paris: Éditions et librairie. p. 256.

=== The French Armies in the Great War ===
- Service historique de l'état-major des armées (1922–1939). Les Armées françaises dans la Grande Guerre [The French Armies in the Great War] (in French). Paris: Imprimerie nationale.
  - Ministère de la guerre (1936). Les préliminaires, La bataille des frontières, t. 1 [The Preliminaries, The Battle of the Borders, t. 1] (in French). Vol. 1. Paris: Imprimerie Nationale. p. 602.
  - Ministère de la guerre (1922). Annexes, t. 1 (in French). Vol. 1. Paris: Imprimerie Nationale. p. 1026.
  - Ministère de la guerre (1925). La manœuvre en retraite et les préliminaires de la bataille de la Marne, t. 1 [The Retreat and Preliminaries of the Battle of the Marne, t. 1] (in French). Vol. 2. Paris: Imprimerie Nationale. p. 842.
  - Ministère de la guerre (1933). La bataille de l'Aisne, la course à la mer, la bataille des Flandres, les opérations sur le front stabilisé (14 septembre - 14 novembre 1914), t. 1 [The Battle of the Aisne, the Race to the Sea, the Battle of Flanders, operations on the stabilized front (September 14 - November 14, 1914), t. 1] (in French). Vol. 4. Paris: Imprimerie Nationale. p. 568.
  - Ministère de la guerre (1930a). La stabilisation du front - Les attaques locales (14 novembre 1914 - 1er mai 1915), t. 2 [Stabilization of the Front - Local Attacks (November 14, 1914 - May 1, 1915), t. 2] (in French). Paris: Imprimerie Nationale. p. 728.
  - Ministère de la guerre (1931a). Annexes, t. 2 (in French). Vol. 1. Paris: Imprimerie Nationale. p. 1262.
  - Ministère de la guerre (1931b). Annexes, t. 2 (in French). Vol. 2. Paris: Imprimerie Nationale. p. 1210.
  - Ministère de la guerre (1930b). Annexes, t. 5 (in French). Vol. 1. Paris: Imprimerie Nationale. p. 840.
  - Ministère de la guerre (1931c). Annexes, t. 5 (in French). Vol. 2. Paris: Imprimerie Nationale.
  - Ministère de la guerre (1930c). L'hiver 1917-1918 (1er novembre 1917 - 20 mars 1918), t. 6 [Winter 1917-1918 (November 1, 1917 - March 20, 1918), t. 6] (in French). Vol. 1. Paris: Imprimerie Nationale. p. 520.
  - Ministère de la guerre (1930d). Annexes, t. 6 (in French). Vol. 1. Paris: Imprimerie Nationale. p. 1003.
  - Ministère de la guerre (1923). Ordres de bataille des grandes unités: grands quartiers généraux, groupe d'armées, armées, corps d'armée, t. 10 [Orders of battle of major units: headquarters, army groups, armies, army corps, t. 10] (in French). Vol. 1. Paris: Imprimerie Nationale. p. 966.
  - Ministère de la guerre (1924). Ordres de bataille des grandes unités: divisions d'infanterie, divisions de cavalerie, t. 10 [Orders of battle of major units: infantry divisions, cavalry divisions, t. 10] (in French). Vol. 2. Paris: Imprimerie Nationale. p. 1092.
  - Ministère de la guerre (1937). La direction de l'arrière, t. 11 [The direction of the rear] (in French). Paris: Imprimerie Nationale. p. 1209.

=== Current works ===
- Aubagnac, Gilles (2010). "Les deux batailles de la Marne: 1914 et 1918" [The two battles of the Marne: 1914 and 1918]. Au son du canon: vingt batailles de l'Artillerie [To the Sound of the Cannon: Twenty Battles of Artillery] (in French). Lyon: EMCC. p. 144. ISBN 978-2-35740-083-2.
- Aubagnac, Gilles; Berlemont, Johanne; Boutet, Marjolaine (2016). Un milliard d'obus, des millions d'hommes: l'artillerie en 14/18 [A billion shells, millions of men: artillery in 14/18] (in French). Paris: Lienart éditions. p. 207. ISBN 978-2-35906-175-8.
- Benoît, Christian (1996). Le canon de 75: une gloire centenaire [The 75mm cannon: a century-old glory] (in French). Vincennes: Service historique de l'Armée de terre. p. 80. ISBN 2-86323-102-2.
- Bonijoly, Colonel Roger (2002). "L'Artillerie française pendant la Première Guerre mondiale" [French Artillery during the First World War]. Bulletin semestriel des Amis du musée de l'Artillerie à Draguignan (in French). 30.
- Bresse, Général R. (2003). "Histoire de l'artillerie de terre française" [History of French land artillery]. CERMA (in French). Hors-série n° 1.
- Doughty, Robert A. (2005). Pyrrhic Victory: French Strategy and Operations in the Great War. Harvard University Press. ASIN B008UZ24KG.
- Goya, Michel (2014). L'Invention de la guerre moderne: du pantalon rouge au char d'assaut, 1871-1918 [The Invention of Modern Warfare: From Red Trousers to the Tank, 1871-1918] (in French). Paris: Tallandier. p. 479. ISBN 979-10-210-0460-3.
- François, Général Guy (2013). Le canon de 75, modèle 1897 [The 75mm cannon, model 1897] (in French). Louviers: Ysec. p. 31. ISBN 978-2-84673-176-8.
- Greenhalgh, Elizabeth (2014). The French Army and the First World War. Cambridge University Press. ISBN 978-1107605688.
- Hogg, Ian V. (1971). The Guns: 1914-18. Ballantine Books. ASIN B001LA33KC.
- Sumner, Ian (2009). French Poilu 1914-18. Osprey Publishing. ISBN 978-1846033322.
- Marble, Sanders (2014). Artillery in the Great War. Pen and Sword Military. ISBN 978-1783030125.
- Touzin, Pierre; Vauvillier, François; François, Guy (2008–2010). Les Canons de la Victoire 1914-1918 [The Guns of Victory 1914-1918] (in French). Vol. 3, 4 and 5. Paris: Histoire et Collections.
  - Touzin, Pierre; Vauvillier, François; François, Guy (2006). L'Artillerie de campagne: pièces légères et pièces lourdes, t. 1 [Field artillery: light and heavy pieces, t. 1] (in French). Paris: Histoire et Collections. p. 65. ISBN 978-2-35250-106-0.
  - Touzin, Pierre; Vauvillier, François; François, Guy (2008). L'Artillerie lourde à grande puissance, t. 2 [Heavy artillery with high power, t. 2] (in French). Paris: Histoire et Collections. p. 66. ISBN 978-2-35250-085-8.
  - Touzin, Pierre; Vauvillier, François; François, Guy (2010). L'Artillerie de côte et l'artillerie de tranchée, t. 3 [Coastal artillery and trench artillery, t. 3] (in French). Paris: Histoire et Collections. p. 67. ISBN 978-2-35250-161-9.
- Zabecki, David (2006). The German 1918 Offensives: A Case Study in The Operational Level of War. Routledge. ISBN 0415558794.
- Zaloga, Steven (2020). The French 75: The 75mm M1897 Field Gun That Revolutionized Modern Artillery: 288. Osprey Publishing. ISBN 978-1472839305.
