= 24 cm SK L/30 "Theodor Otto" =

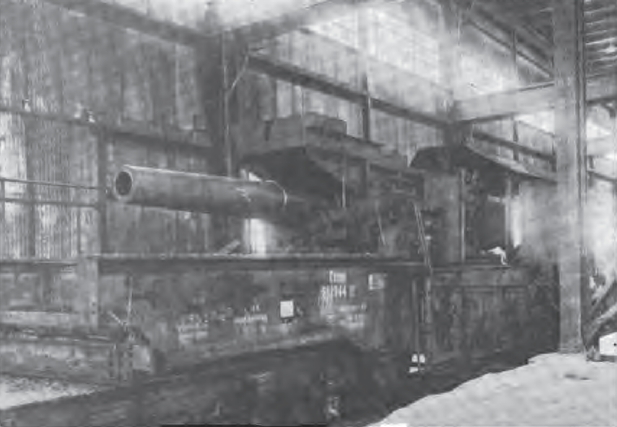
- Note the prominent counterweight over the barrel
- Type: Railroad gun
- Place of origin: German Empire

Service history
- In service: 1918
- Used by: German Empire
- Wars: World War I

Production history
- Designer: Krupp
- Manufacturer: Krupp
- Produced: 1917—1918
- No. built: 4

Specifications
- Mass: 103 tonnes (101 long tons; 114 short tons)
- Length: 15.85 metres (52 ft 0 in)
- Barrel length: approx. 7.14 metres (23 ft 5 in) L/30
- Shell: separate-loading, cased charge
- Caliber: 238 millimetres (9.4 in)
- Breech: horizontal sliding-wedge
- Recoil: hydro-pneumatic
- Carriage: 2 x 4-axle trucks
- Elevation: +0° to 45°
- Traverse: 4°
- Muzzle velocity: 640 m/s (2,100 ft/s)
- Maximum firing range: 18,700 metres (20,500 yd)

The 24 cm SK L/30 "Theodor Otto" (SK - Schnelladungskanone (Fast-loading cannon) L - Lange (with a 30 caliber barrel) was a German railroad gun used in World War I. Four were built and saw service in 1918 on the Western Front.

== Design and history ==
These guns were originally fitted to the obsolete armored ship SMS Oldenburg, which had been disarmed when it was converted to a target ship about 1912. One obvious change made for land service was the placement of a large counterweight just forward of the trunnions to counteract the preponderance of weight towards the breech. This, although heavy, was simpler than adding equilibrators to perform the same function. Four were fitted in 1918 to the railroad and firing platform mounts (Eisenbahn und Bettungsschiessgerüst) (E. u. B.) designed for the 24 cm SK L/40 "Theodor Karl". This was fairly simple, but required an even larger counterweight to compensate for the older gun's shorter barrel and greater weight.

The E. u. B. could fire from any suitable section of track after curved wedges were bolted to the track behind each wheel to absorb any residual recoil after the gun cradle recoiled backwards. It also had a pintle built into the underside of the front of the mount. Two large rollers were fitted to the underside of the mount at the rear. Seven cars could carry a portable metal firing platform (Bettungslafette) that had a central pivot mount and an outer rail. It was assembled with the aid of a derrick or crane, which took between three and five days, and railroad tracks were laid slightly past the firing platform to accommodate the front bogies of the gun. The gun was moved over the firing platform and then lowered into position after the central section of rail was removed. After the gun's pintle was bolted to the firing platform's pivot mount, the entire carriage was jacked up so that the trucks and their sections of rail could be removed. The carriage was then lowered so that the rear rollers rested on the outer track. Concrete versions were also used. It could have up to 360° of traverse. The E. u. B. mount retained 4° of on-mount traverse for fine aiming adjustments.

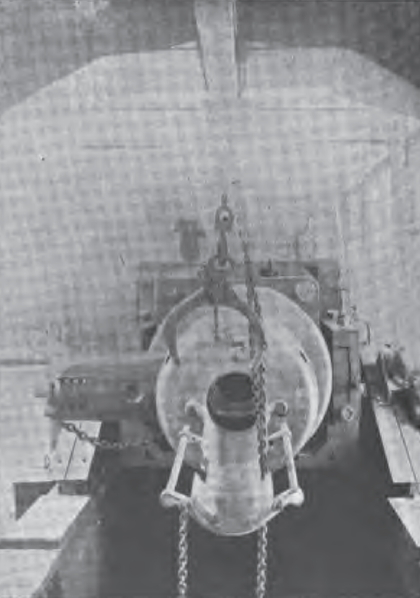
Breech, cradle, loading tray and shell tongs of a "Theodor Otto"

=== Ammunition ===
Ammunition was moved by means of an overhead rail from which a pair of shell tongs lifted up individual shells to be placed in the loading tray fixed to the breech. An extensible rail could be raised and braced in place to allow the tongs to reach shells placed on the ground or in an ammunition car behind the mount. The gun had to be at zero elevation to load and thus it had to be re-aimed after every shot. The "Theodor Otto" fired several different shells with weights between 140 and 151 kilograms (309 and 333 lb). It used the German naval system of ammunition, where the base charge was held in a metallic cartridge case and supplemented by another charge in a silk bag which was rammed first.

== Combat history ==
Little is known of their service, although the Americans captured one in November 1918. Nothing is known of their disposition after the Armistice.

== See also ==
- BL 9.2-inch Railway Gun: approximate British equivalent

== Sources ==
- François, Guy. Eisenbahnartillerie: Histoire de l'artillerie lourd sur voie ferrée allemande des origines à 1945. Paris: Editions Histoire et Fortifications, 2006
- Jäger, Herbert. German Artillery of World War One. Ramsbury, Marlborough, Wiltshire: Crowood Press, 2001 ISBN 1-86126-403-8
- Kosar, Franz. Eisenbahngeschütz der Welt. Stuttgart: Motorbook, 1999 ISBN 3-613-01976-0
- Miller, H. W., Lt. Col. Railway Artillery: A Report on the Characteristics, Scope of Utility, Etc., of Railway Artillery, Volume I Washington: Government Print Office, 1921
- Schmalenbach, Paul (1983). "German Navy Large Bore Guns Operational Ashore During World War I". Warship International. XX (2): 123–153. ISSN 0043-0374.
