= BL 9.2-inch railway gun =

Ordnance BL 9.2-inch Gun on truck, railway
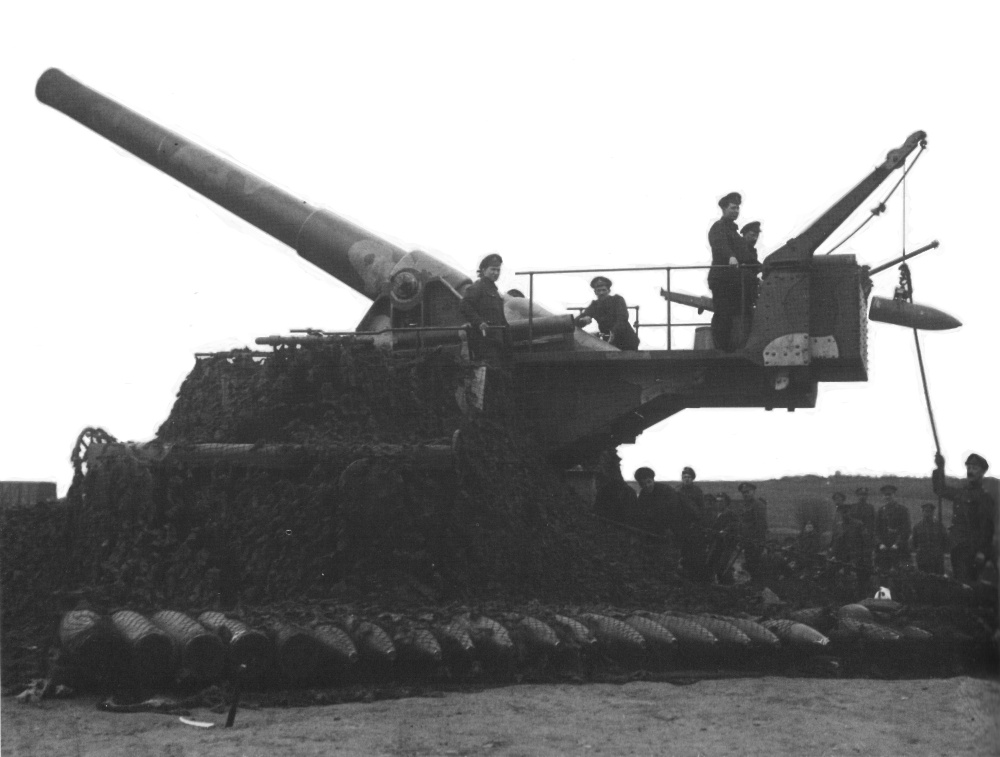
- Camouflaged Mk XIII gun in action in France in World War I
- Type: Railway gun
- Place of origin: United Kingdom

Service history
- In service: 1915–1945
- Used by: United Kingdom
- Wars: First World War

Production history
- Manufacturer: Elswick Ordnance Company

Specifications
- Shell: HE 380 pounds (172.37 kg)
- Calibre: 9.2 inches (233.7 mm)
- Recoil: inclined slide
- Elevation: Mk I: 28° MK IV: 40°
- Traverse: Mk I: 10° L & R Mk III: 360°
- Effective firing range: Mk III & VI: 17,000 yd (15,540 m); Mk X: 21,000 yd (19,200 m); Mk XIII: 22,600 yd (20,670 m)
- Filling: Lyddite, Amatol
- Filling weight: 40 pounds (18.14 kg)

The British Ordnance BL 9.2 inch gun on truck, railway mounted a variety of surplus 9.2 inch naval guns, together with the custom-designed Mk XIII railway gun, on various railway platforms to provide mobile long-range heavy artillery on the Western Front in World War I. Mk XIII remained in service for British home defence in World War II.

== History ==
=== Second Boer War 1899-1902 ===
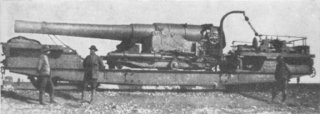
The gun at Belfast, August 1900

A 9.2 inch railway gun was first deployed in 1900. The British mounted a 9.2 inch gun from the Cape Town coastal defences on a railway truck and sent it up the railway line to support the British assault on Boer defences at Belfast, north-east of Johannesburg. The battle ended on 27 August 1900 before the gun arrived, and as the Boers thereafter resorted to guerrilla warfare this innovation was not used in action during the war.

=== World War I ===
Early in 1915 a variety of surplus Mk III and Mk VI 9.2-inch naval and coast-defence guns were adapted by the Elswick Ordnance Company for mounting on railway trucks for use in France and Belgium. They were mounted on Vavasseur slides, which travelled backwards and upwards to absorb the recoil, on "well-based" trucks, where the base was level with the axles.

These early mountings allowed 10° of traverse left and right, and moved forward and backwards along curved sections of track for further traversing. They limited elevation to 28° and hence limited maximum range. In March 1916 a modification increased elevation to 35°.

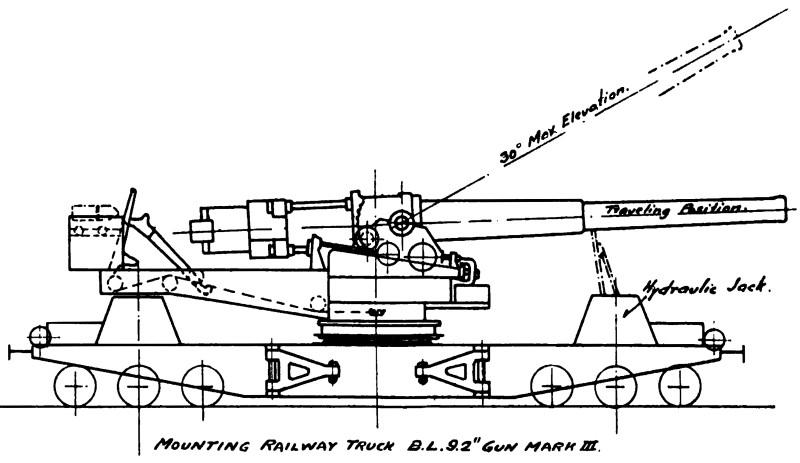
Mk X gun on Mk II "straight-back" truck

In June 1916 Elswick produced a more sophisticated turntable mounting with a loading platform, on a "straight-back" truck which mounted the gun much higher. This was lowered to the ground for firing, had outriggers for stability, allowed 360° traverse and elevation to 30°. The more modern Mk X gun was mounted on this design, together with 2 Mk X variants intended for Australian coast defence (Mk XT), 4 Vickers 45-calibre guns (Mk XIV) which were originally intended for a foreign order, and a specially developed 35-calibres railway gun (Mk XIII).

=== Mk XIII gun ===
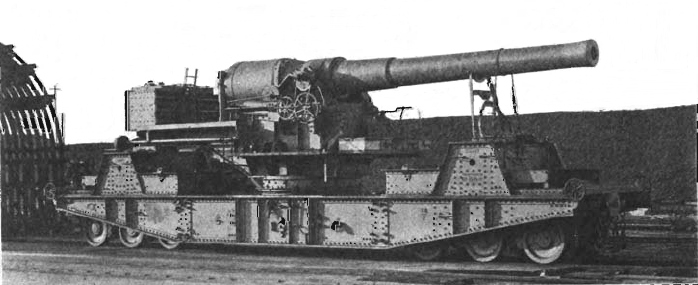
BL 9.2 inch Mk XIII railway gun

The custom-designed 35-calibres Mk XIII gun had a heavier breech which allowed the trunnions to be closer to the breech and hence the breech did not depress as far when the barrel was elevated. On a new Mk IV mounting, Mk XIII guns could then be elevated to 40° and attain a range of 22,600 yards. These remained in service until 1945, serving in the home defence of Britain in World War II where they were deployed on railways in the south and east of Britain, along with 12" rail howitzers. Their main role in WW2 was to bombard any hostile landing, and potentially any captured airfields. Live firing produced a significant recoil and so rail spurs were laid specifically for the rail guns which incorporated ground anchors, and allowed firing in the general direction of the track. The blast wave from the guns could damage civilian infrastructure so the rail spurs were generally in unpopulated areas.

== Combat service ==
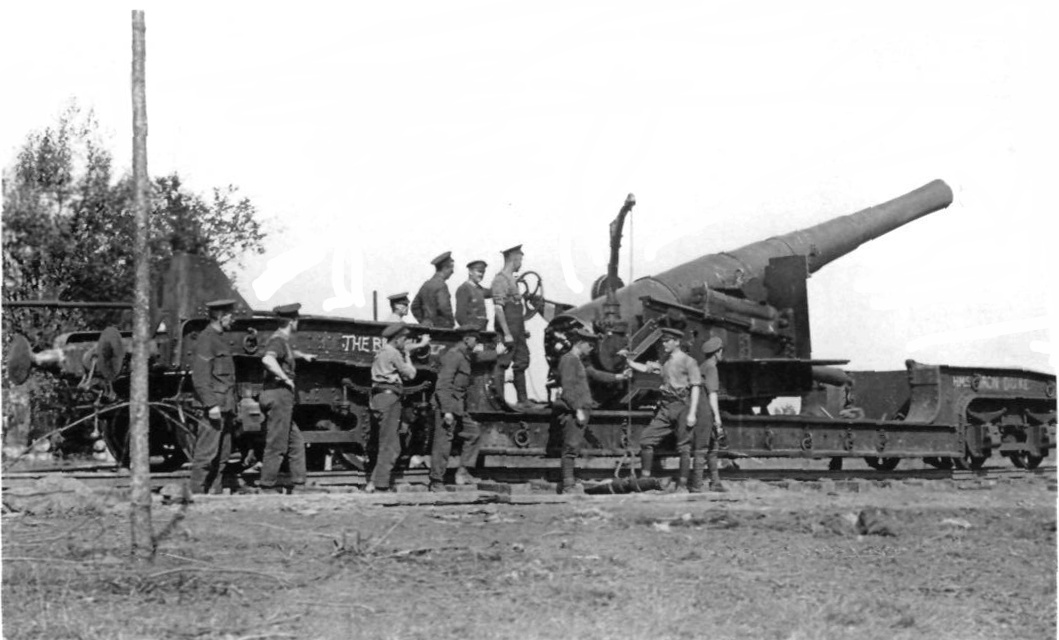
HMS Iron Duke, a Mk III* or Mk VI gun on Mk I well-based railway truck, in action at Maricourt, Battle of the Somme, September 1916

9.2-inch railway guns expended 45,000 rounds during World War I. At the Armistice guns in service were :
First Army : 6 guns : Batteries 366 (2), 461 (2), 523 (2)
Second Army : 3 guns : Batteries 45 (2), 53 (1)
Third Army : 4 guns : Batteries 363 (2), 442 (2)
Fifth Army : 3 guns : Batteries 53 (1), 546 (2)

Mk XIII guns remained in service until 1945; all others were declared obsolete after World War I.

== See also ==
- List of railway artillery

=== Weapons of comparable role, performance and era ===
- 24 cm SK L/40 "Theodor Karl" : Approximate German equivalent
- 24 cm SK L/30 "Theodor Otto" : Approximate German equivalent

== Bibliography ==
- Dale Clarke, British Artillery 1914-1919. Heavy Artillery. Osprey Publishing, Oxford UK, 2005 ISBN 1-84176-788-3
- General Sir Martin Farndale, History of the Royal Regiment of Artillery. Western Front 1914–18. London: Royal Artillery Institution, 1986. ISBN 1-870114-00-0
- Major D Hall, The South African Military History Society. Military History Journal - Vol 2 No 3 June 1972. Guns in South Africa 1899-1902 Part V and VI
- I.V. Hogg & L.F. Thurston, British Artillery Weapons & Ammunition 1914 - 1918. London: Ian Allan, 1972
- Admiral Sir Percy Scott, "Fifty Years in the Royal Navy". London: John Murray, 1919
