= 15 cm SK "Nathan" =

15 cm SK L/45 "Nathan"
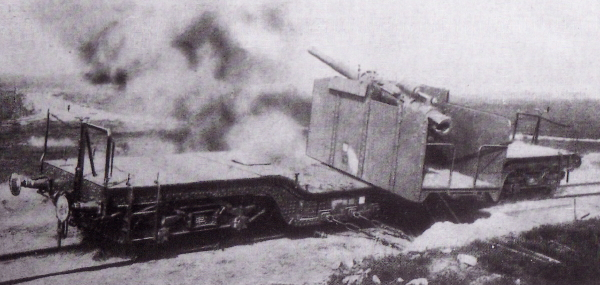
- "Nathan" firing; note the chains to anchor it in place
- Type: Railway gun
- Place of origin: German Empire

Service history
- In service: 1916—18
- Used by: German Empire
- Wars: World War I

Production history
- Designer: Krupp
- Manufacturer: Krupp
- No. built: 21+

Specifications
- Mass: 55.5 tonnes (54.6 long tons; 61.2 short tons)
- Barrel length: 6.326 metres (20 ft 9 in) L/42.4
- Shell: separate-loading, cased charge
- Caliber: 149.1 millimetres (5.87 in)
- Breech: horizontal sliding-wedge
- Carriage: 2 x 2-axle bogies
- Elevation: +0° to 45°
- Traverse: 50° or 180° with side restraints
- Muzzle velocity: 840 metres per second (2,800 ft/s)
- Maximum firing range: 22,675 metres (24,798 yd)

The 15 cm SK L/45 "Nathan" or, more formally, the 15 cm SK L/45 in Mittelpivot-Lafette (SK - Schnelladekanone (quick loading gun)) 45 caliber on a central-pivot mount was a German railroad gun used in World War I.

== Design and history ==
The Germans were desperate for long-range artillery in the early part of World War I and resorted to mounting naval guns on wheeled carriages as well as rail cars. The wheeled carriages were less than successful due to their great weight, but the rail-mounted guns rather more so. All of the naval guns received nicknames and were crewed by sailors. The 15 cm guns were called "Nathan", "Nathan Ernst" and "Nathan Emil" although the reason for three different names isn't known for certain. Quite probably they were used to differentiate between models of the 15 cm gun as both the C/13 and the C/16 guns are known to have been used. The latter guns were originally intended for the canceled Cöln-class cruisers then under construction while the former were spare guns for dreadnoughts and older light cruisers.

At any rate the 15 cm guns were mounted in a well-base flatcar with two four-wheel bogies. No outriggers were fitted so the recoil energy from shots fired perpendicular to the railroad track could rock the flatcar significantly even with it chained to the ground. They were fitted with front and side gunshields, although, oddly enough, no overhead armor was fitted. They first saw service in 1918 and appear to have been mainly used for coastal defense duties.

It fired naval Spgr. L/5 (Haube) HE shells weighing 44 kilograms (97 lb) with 5 kilograms (11 lb) of explosive filler. It used the German naval system of ammunition where the base charge was held in a metallic cartridge case and supplemented by another charge in a silk bag which was rammed first.

The same gun was used for coast defense duties in concrete emplacements after World War I as the 15 cm SK L/45.

== Bibliography ==
- François, Guy. Eisenbahnartillerie: Histoire de l'artillerie lourd sur voie ferrée allemande des origines à 1945. Paris: Editions Histoire et Fortifications, 2006
