= Obusier de 200 "Pérou" sur affût-truck TAZ Schneider =

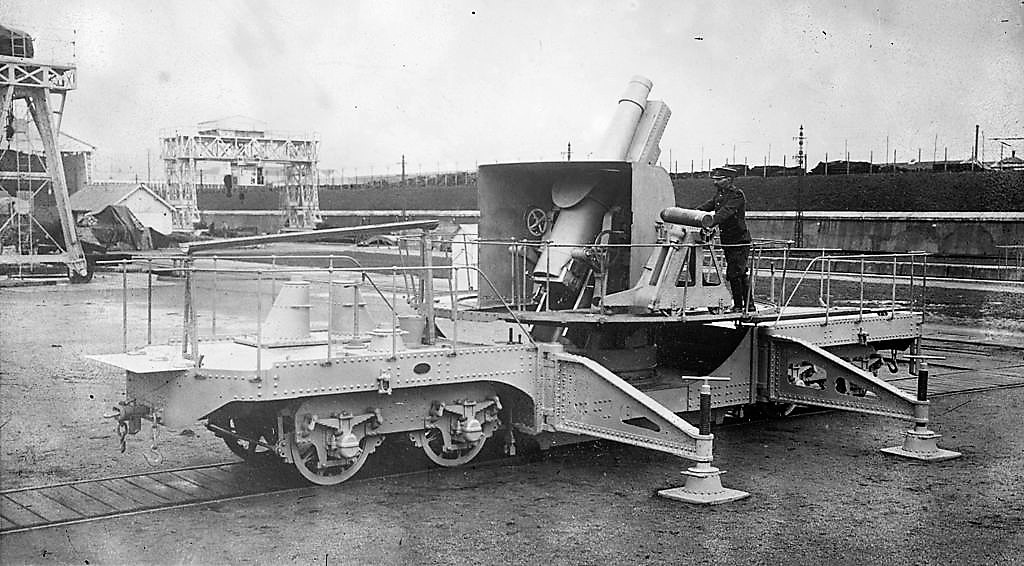
- A howitzer with outriggers deployed and its firing platform unfolded.
- Type: Railway gun
- Place of origin: France

Service history
- In service: 1914–1918
- Used by: France
- Wars: World War I

Production history
- Designer: Schneider
- Designed: 1914
- Produced: 1914
- No. built: 2

Specifications
- Mass: 38,250 kg (84,330 lb)
- Length: 12.09 m (39 ft 8 in)
- Barrel length: 3 m (9 ft 10 in) L/15
- Shell: Separate-loading, cased charge and projectiles.
- Shell weight: Projectile: 100 kg (220 lb); Charge: 13 kg (29 lb)
- Caliber: 200 mm (7.9 in)
- Breech: Interrupted screw
- Recoil: Hydro-pneumatic recoil
- Carriage: Top carriage traverse on 4-axle carriage
- Elevation: -5° to +60°
- Traverse: 360°
- Muzzle velocity: 425 m/s (1,395 ft/s)
- Maximum firing range: 11 km (6.8 mi)

The Obusier de 200 "Pérou" sur affût-truck TAZ Schneider was a French railway gun built before and served throughout the First World War. It was one of the first French railway guns mounted on a standard gauge rail car during the First World War.

== History ==
Although the majority of combatants had heavy field artillery prior to the outbreak of the First World War, none had adequate numbers of heavy guns in service, nor had they foreseen the growing importance of heavy artillery once the Western Front stagnated and trench warfare set in. Since aircraft of the period were not yet capable of carrying large diameter bombs the burden of delivering heavy firepower fell on the artillery. Two sources of heavy artillery suitable for conversion to field use were surplus coastal defense guns and naval guns.

However, a paradox faced artillery designers of the time; while large caliber naval guns were common, large caliber land weapons were not due to their weight, complexity, and lack of mobility. Large caliber field guns often required extensive site preparation because the guns had to be broken down into multiple loads light enough to be towed by a horse team or the few traction engines of the time and then reassembled before use. Building a new gun could address the problem of disassembling, transporting and reassembling a large gun, but it didn't necessarily address how to convert existing heavy weapons to make them more mobile. Rail transport proved to be the most practical solution because the problems of heavy weight, lack of mobility and reduced setup time were addressed.

== Design ==
The Obusier de 200 "Pérou" sur affût-truck TAZ Schneider began life as two rail mounted coastal defense howitzers ordered by Peru in 1910 from Schneider that were produced at their Le Havre factory. The two howitzers were seized by the French Army when war broke out. The howitzers were designated as Obusier ("howitzer" in English), sur affût-truck "railway carriage mounted", and TAZ (from Tous Azimuts) "all azimuth" in English. The barrels were of built-up steel construction consisting of a rifled steel liner and protective outer jacket 15 calibers in length. The barrels were trunnioned at their center and were mounted on high-angle center pivot mounts and provided with gun shields. The howitzers incorporated a U-shaped hydro-pneumatic recoil mechanism below the barrel, interrupted screw breech and fired separate-loading, cased charges and projectiles. A disadvantage was that the 200 mm (7.9 in) ammunition was not used by any other French guns.

The howitzers were mounted on four-axle well base carriages and were top carriage traversing mounts with 360° of traverse. Once on site the carriage's outriggers would be unfolded and jackscrews at the ends of the outriggers lowered to level the carriage and take the weight off the axles while four rail clamps would anchor the carriage in place. A circular gun platform unfolded to give the gun crew a level work surface for loading, traversing and elevating the guns. The elevation system had a combination of a rapid system which lowered the barrel to +5° for reloading while a slow system allowed for small adjustments to vary range. Traverse was by a worm gear at the base of the mount which allowed for fine adjustment.

In service, the two guns operated as a battery, sharing both an ammunition wagon and a command wagon equipped with a telescopic observation post for an artillery spotter. Ammunition was transferred from the wagon to the howitzers via an elevated trough, and projectiles could be placed on a cart running along a rail within the firing platform for loading. This arrangement allowed the howitzer to be loaded while oriented in any direction.

== Deployment ==
The mobile battery consists of four railroad cars. Two cars have an 8-inch rapid-fire gun, there is an ammunition car that is between the two gun cars, and a telescoping observation car. The advantages of the Schneider train were that it was less costly than a fixed battery of the same firepower; the train allowed a degree of secrecy since it was not in a fixed location; ease of maintenance since it could be stored in a train shed; there was no need to construct new roads for its use; and any railroad tracks laid for its use can also be used by passenger and freight haulage. The cars of the train were arranged with the train engine first, followed by the observation car, then the first gun car, the ammunition car, and then the second gun car. The observation car was placed near the engine so that the commanding officer could more easily place the train where required. The ammunition car was placed between the two gun cars to provide the shortest distance to move the artillery shells to each gun.

== World War I ==
The two guns were assigned to the 51e batterie du 1er Régiment d'Artillerie à Pied or foot artillery regiment in English of the ALVF (Artillerie Lourde sur Voie Ferrée) or rail mounted heavy artillery in English. They first saw action in Belgium during 1914 in the Race to the Sea to protect Belgium's channel ports from a German offensive and served throughout the war.

== Gallery ==
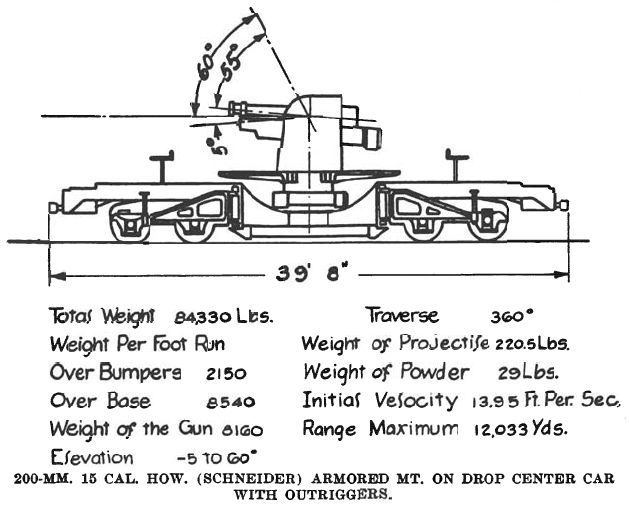
A diagram of the guns.

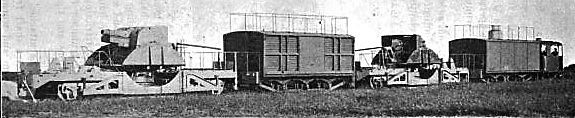
Two guns in travel mode.

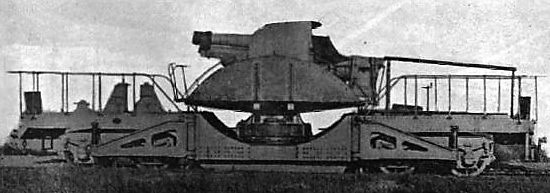

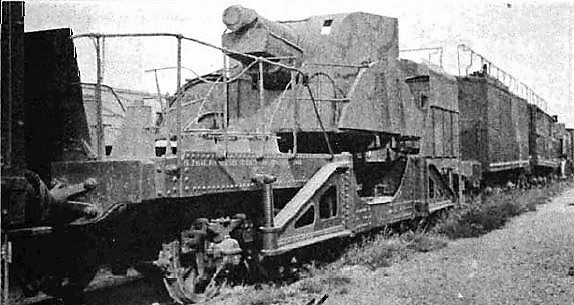

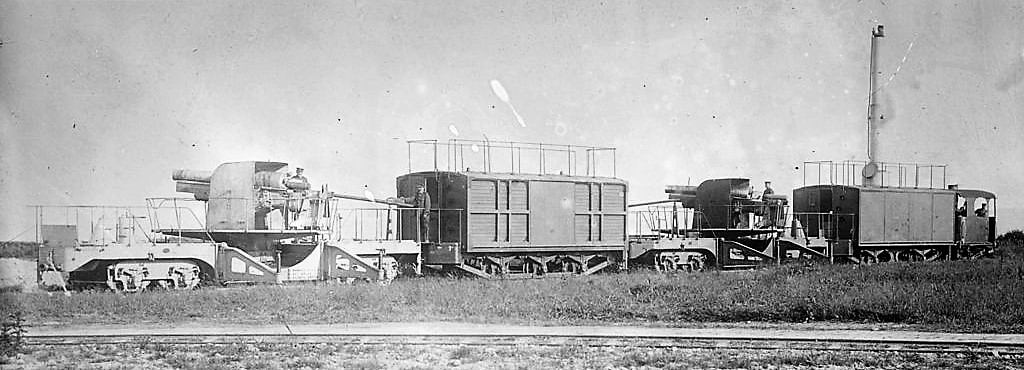
Both guns have their outriggers and firing platform unfolded and their observation post raised.

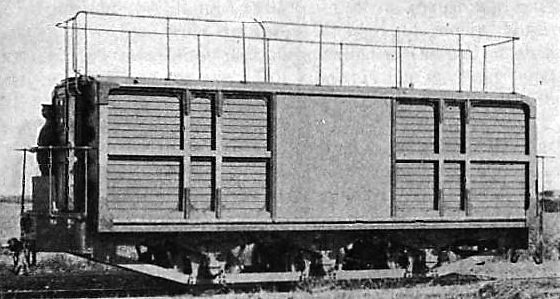
The ammunition wagon.

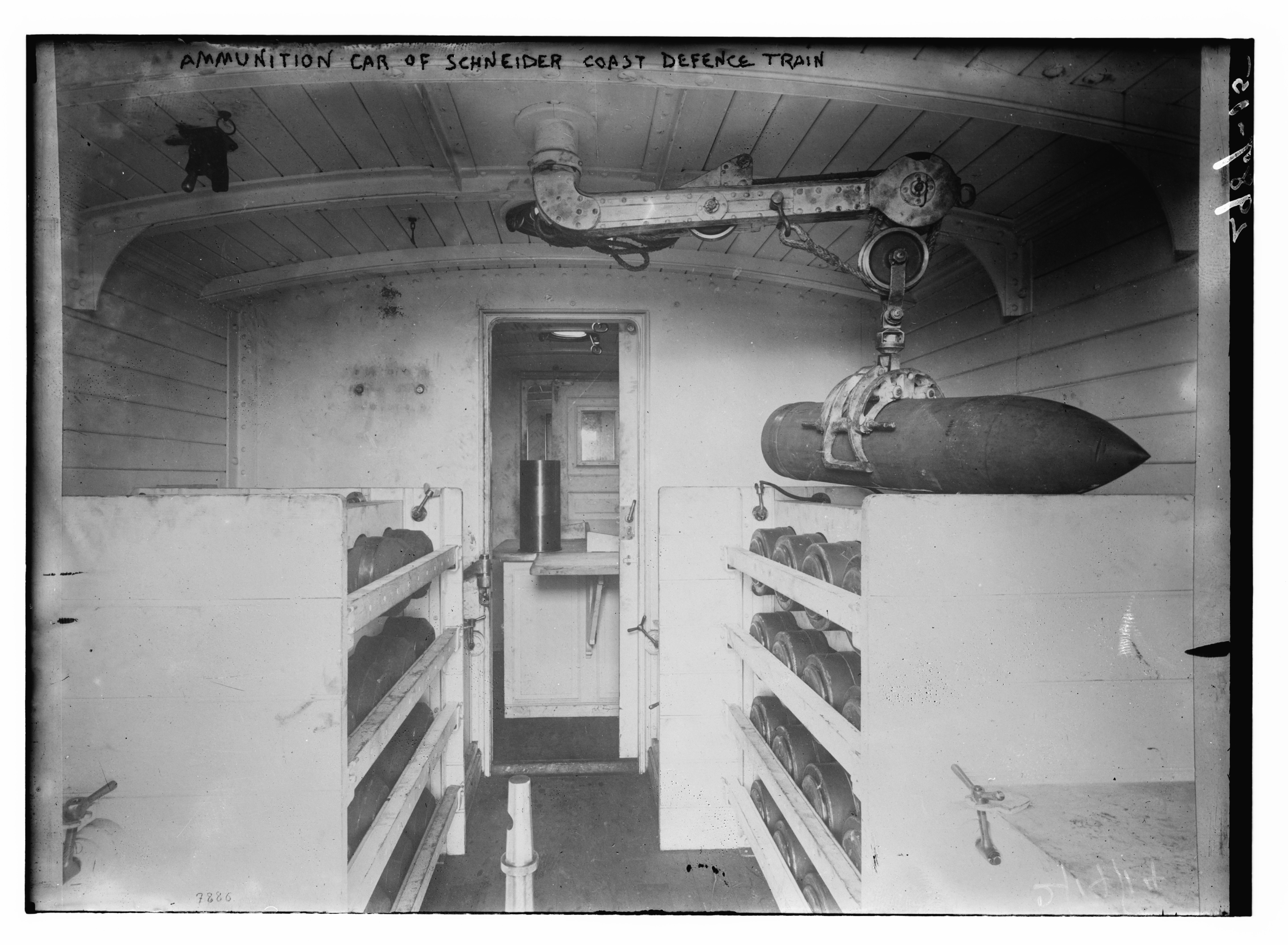
Inside the ammunition wagon.

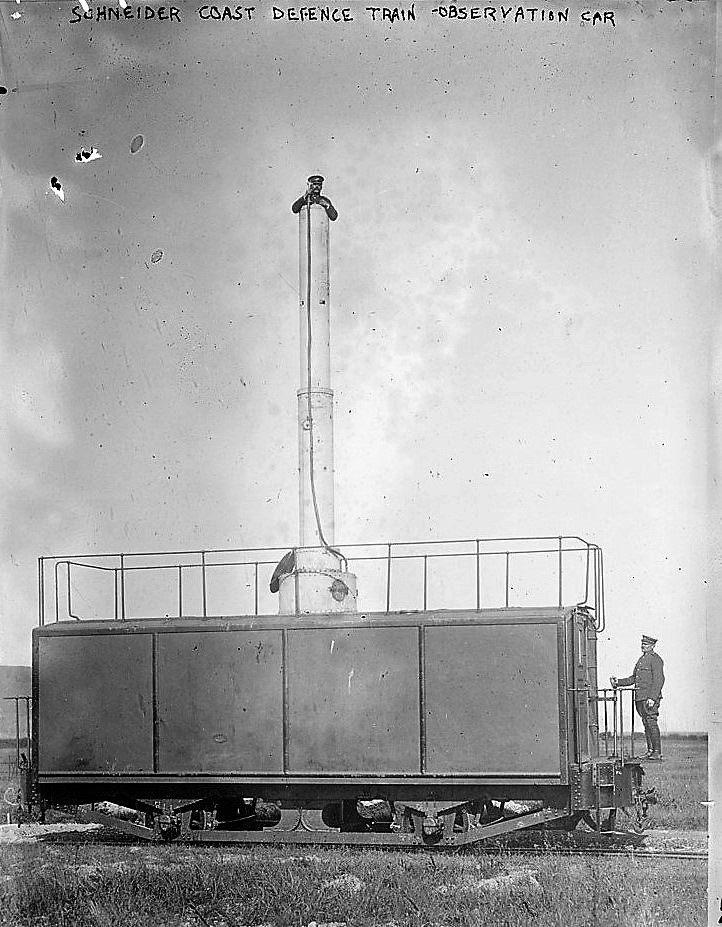
The command wagon with its observation post extended.
