= Railway gun =

Form of large artillery

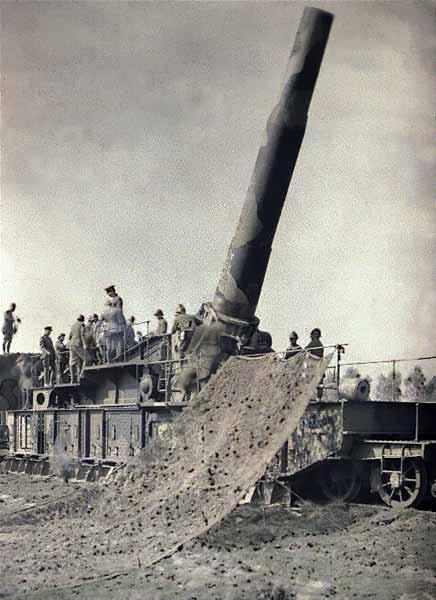
French 370 mm railway howitzer of World War I

A railway gun, also called a railroad gun, is a large artillery piece, often surplus naval artillery, mounted on, transported by, and fired from a specially designed railway wagon. Many countries have built railway guns, but the best-known are the large Krupp-built pieces used by Germany in World War I and World War II. Smaller guns were often part of an armoured train. They were only able to be moved where there were good tracks, which could be destroyed by artillery bombardment or airstrike. Railway guns were phased out after World War II.

== Design considerations ==
The design of a railway gun has three firing issues over and above those of an ordinary artillery piece to consider. Namely how the gun is going to be traversed – i.e. moved from side to side to aim; how the horizontal component of the recoil force will be absorbed by the gun's carriage and how the vertical recoil force will be absorbed by the ground.

=== Methods of traverse ===
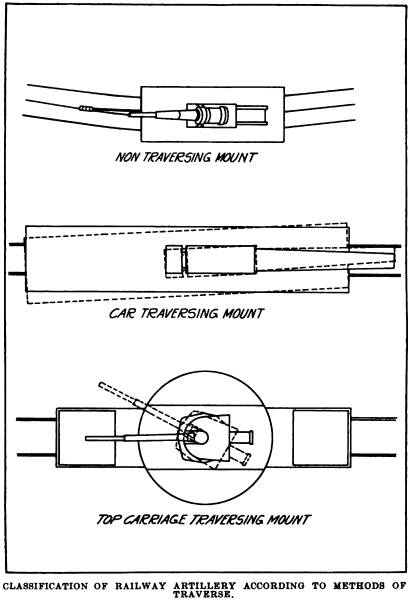
Non-traversing (top); car traversing mount (middle); top carriage traversing mount (bottom)

The first method of traverse is to rely entirely on movement along a curved section of track or on a turntable with no provision to traverse the gun on its mount. The second is to traverse the rail car body on its trucks, known as a car-traversing mount. Generally this is limited to a few degrees of traverse to either side unless an elaborate foundation is built with a centre pivot and traversing rollers. The design of the foundation is the only limit to the amount of traverse allowed in this latter case. The third choice is to allow the separate gun mount to rotate with respect to the rail car body, known as a top-carriage traversing mount. This usually requires the gun to be mounted on a central pivot which, in turn, is mounted on the car body. With few exceptions these types of mounts require some number of outriggers, stabilisers, or earth anchors to keep them in place against the recoil forces and are generally more suitable for smaller guns. The American post–World War I assessment of railway artillery considered that the utility of even a small amount of traverse for fine adjustments was high enough that either of the two latter traversing methods is preferable to a fixed mount.

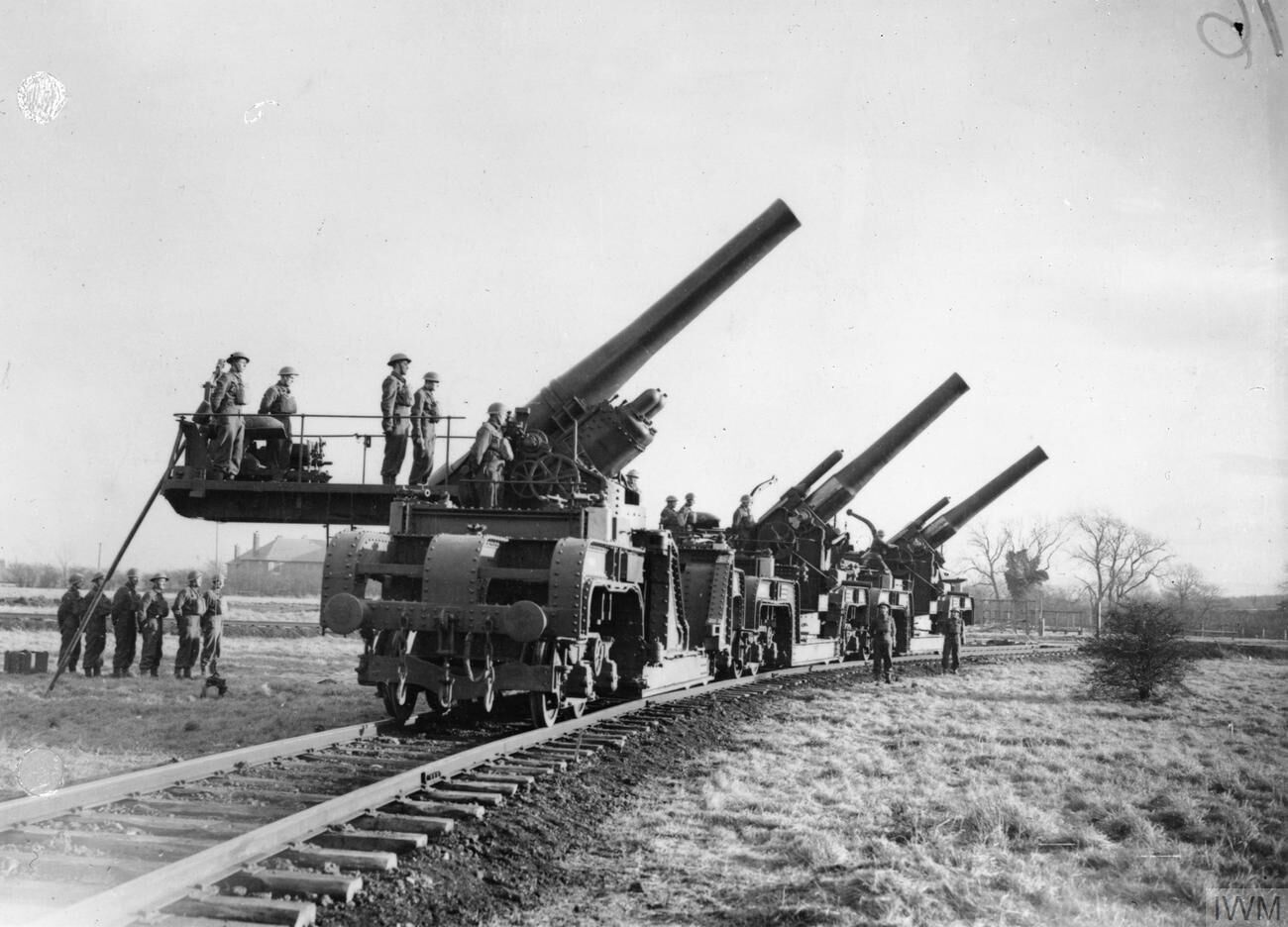
British 12-inch howitzers on top-carriage traversing mounts, traversed 90°, Catterick, December 1940

=== Recoil systems ===
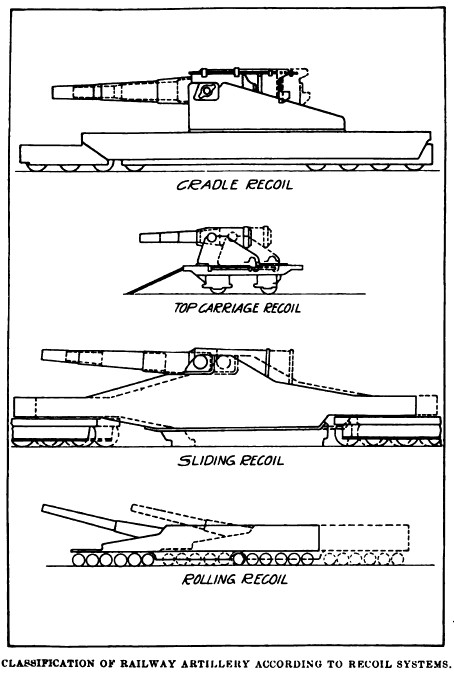
Cradle recoil (top); top carriage recoil (second); sliding recoil (third); rolling recoil (bottom)

There are four primary methods to absorb the recoil force for railway guns: cradle recoil, top-carriage recoil, sliding recoil and rolling recoil.

Cradle recoil means that the gun recoils backward in its cradle, slowed and stopped by hydraulic buffers. It is returned to battery, or the firing position, by either helical springs or by air in a pneumatic recuperator cylinder that is compressed by the force of recoil. This is the most common method used for lighter railway guns and for virtually all field artillery designed after the French introduced their Canon de 75 modèle 1897.

Top-carriage recoil is the situation in which the gun is mounted in an upper carriage that moves on wheels on fixed rails mounted on the lower. The gun and upper carriage recoil together, restrained by the usual hydraulic buffers. Return to battery is effected either by gravity, through the use of inclined rails, which the gun and carriage have run up, by springs, or even by rubber bands, on some improvised mounts. It is not well-suited to firing at steep upward angles because it cannot absorb much of the vertical component of the recoil force.

Sliding recoil has the car body sitting on a set of wooden crossbeams or "sleepers" placed underneath it which have been jacked down on to a special set of girders incorporated into the track so that about half the weight of the mount has been transferred to them from the trucks. The gun, car body and trucks all recoil together with the friction generated by the crossbeams sliding on the girders absorbing the recoil force after moving only about 1 to 2 metres (3.3 to 6.6 ft) to the rear. The sleepers must be jacked up again to allow the gun to roll forward to its firing position. This was often done by handwheels driving gear trains attached to the wheels, or even by electric motors on more modern mounts. Almost all of these types of mounts were of the non-traversing type and had to be fired from a curved section of track or turntable. The American post–World War I assessment of railway artillery praised its ruggedness, ease of manufacture and convenience in service, but acknowledged its unsuitability for smaller guns, due to excessive time of operation and lack of traverse, and that it was not suitable for the largest howitzers firing at high angles because of the enormous trunnion forces.

With rolling recoil the entire gun, mount, and carriage rolls backward, typically between 30 and 50 feet (9.1 and 15.2 m), restrained only by the brakes. The mount was winched back into firing position by cables fastened to the track. This system was usually combined with cradle recoil because the springs of the trucks cannot withstand the vertical component of the recoil force alone. This type of mount was usually fitted with car-traverse. It was unsuitable for smaller guns due to the lack of traverse. The great advantage of this method is that it requires minimal preparation and can fire from any suitable section of curved track.

The methods were often used in combination with each other. Examples include the French 520 mm (20 in) railway howitzer which used cradle-sliding recoil. The American 14"/50 caliber railway gun Mark II used cradle-rolling recoil as did the 14 and 12 inch railway guns from Great Britain. Only the oldest weapons used a combination of top-cradle and sliding recoil. One example being the earliest mounts for the British designed BL 9.2 inch Railway Gun.

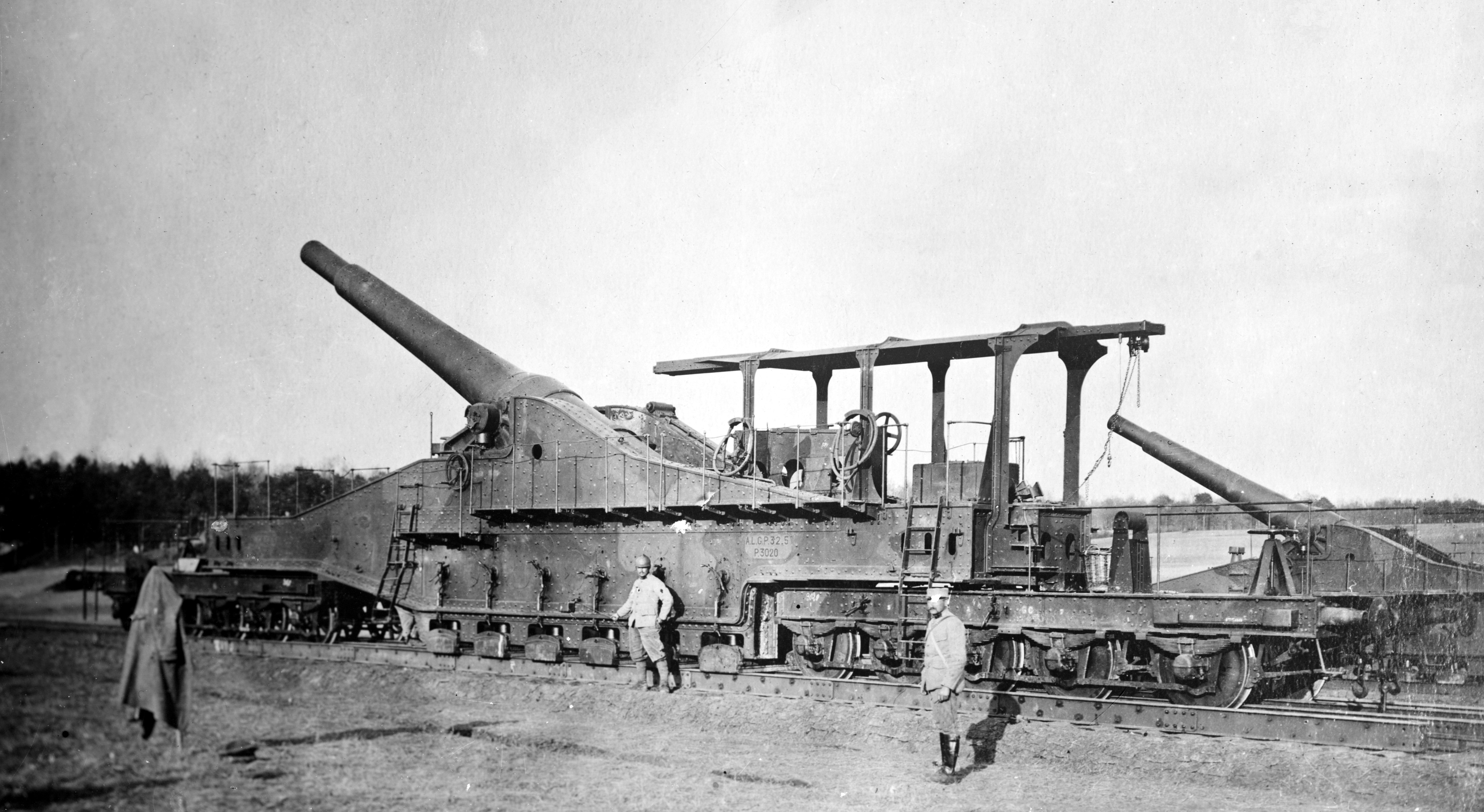
This French 320 mm railway gun uses sliding recoil. The jacked-down sleepers are visible at full-size.

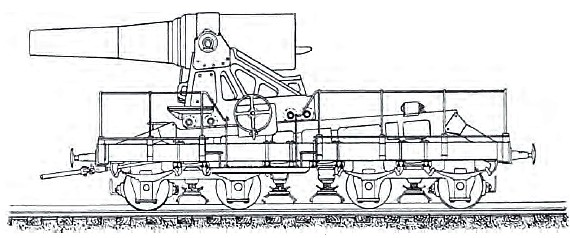
This French 274 mm howitzer used a combination of top-cradle and sliding recoil.

=== Anchorage ===
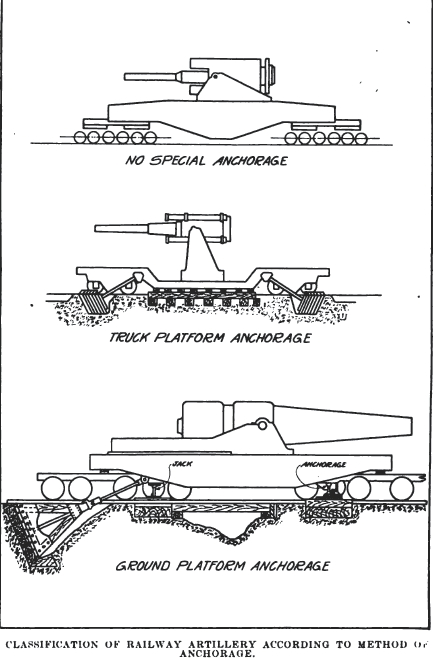
No anchorage needed (top); truck platform anchorage (middle); ground platform anchorage (bottom)

The combination of rolling and cradle-recoil methods absorbed both the horizontal and vertical components of the recoil force and needed no special preparations, but all other types required some method to transmit the vertical force to the ground. One way is to build a platform on either the ties or the ground with girders, beams, pads or floats. The horizontal component would be alleviated by either sliding recoil or rail clamps, guys or struts to secure the mount in place. The French Schneider 194 mm (7.6 in) and 240 mm (9.4 in) mounts and the British 9.2 inch guns and 12 inch howitzers used rail clamps or guys. The American 8 in (200 mm) gun and the French 240 mm Canon de Mle 1893/96 M used struts.

The other method is build a firing position and recoil pit (épi de tir in French) underneath the tracks, using either heavy timbers like the French 340 mm (13 in) and 400 mm (16 in) howitzers or an elaborate concrete or steel base. These latter were mostly used by the Germans for the 21 cm (8.3 in) and larger railway guns and by the French for their Batignollesmounts. Generally, for these emplacements the rails merely served to guide the gun into position and the gun was often mounted on a central pivot to allow up to 360° of traverse. The primary drawback of these positions was the lengthy time to build them.

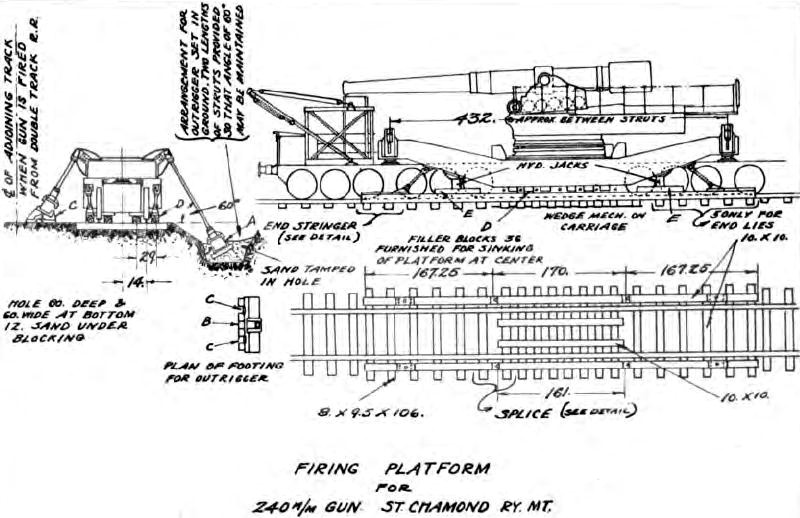
French St Chamond 240 mm Canon de Mle 1893/96, WWI, using ground platform anchorage

== History ==
=== 19th century ===
The idea of railway guns was first suggested in Russia in 1847 by Gustav Kori (proposal), followed by Ye. Repin (project, 1855), Pyotr Lebedev (who outlined the theoretical foundations of the railway artillery in Primeneniye Zheleznykh Dorog k Zashite Materika, 1857) and P. Fomin (developed a project of a large-caliber cannon, 1860).

==== American Civil War ====
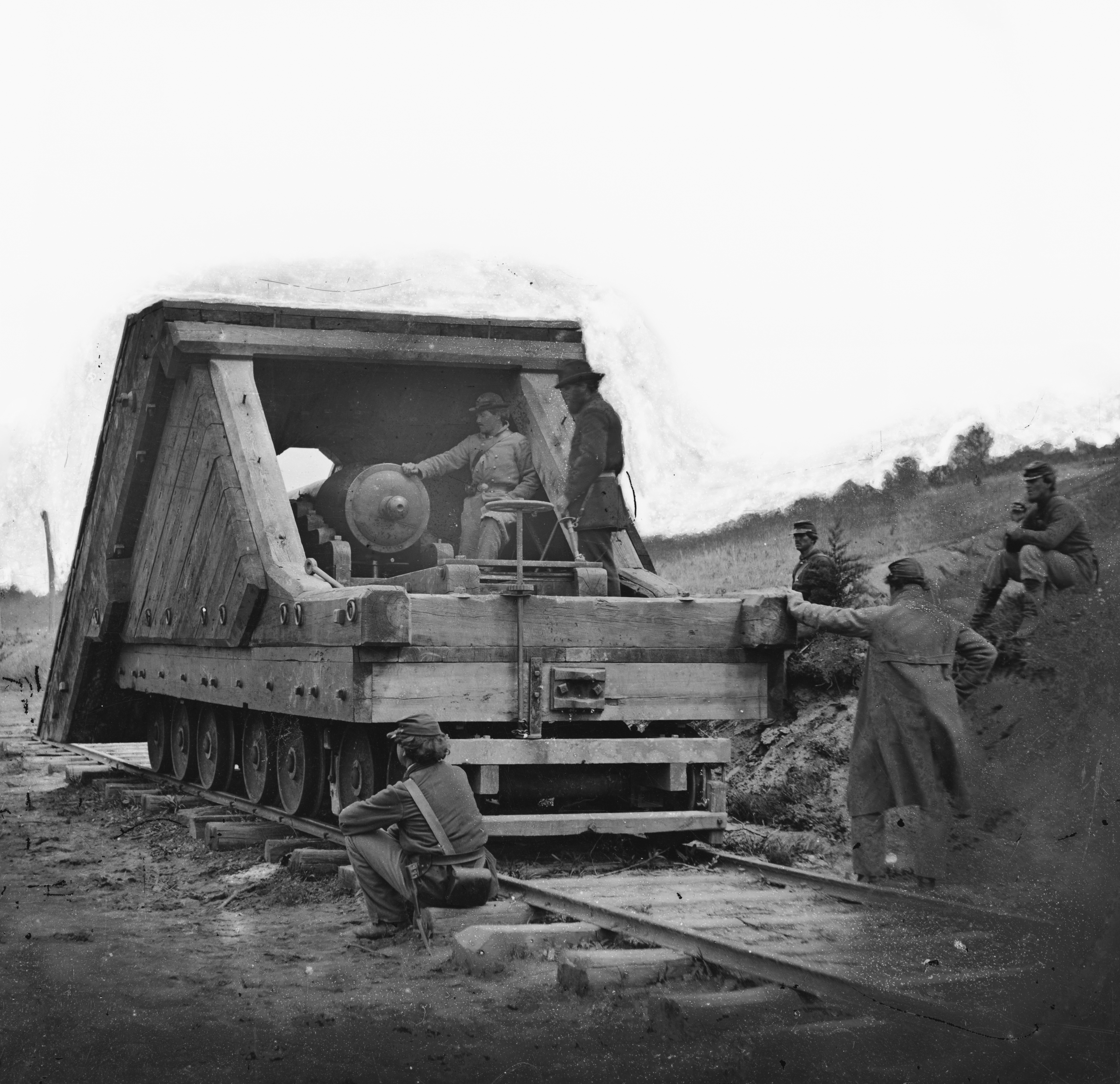
A 32-pounder Brooke naval rifle railway gun used in the American Civil War

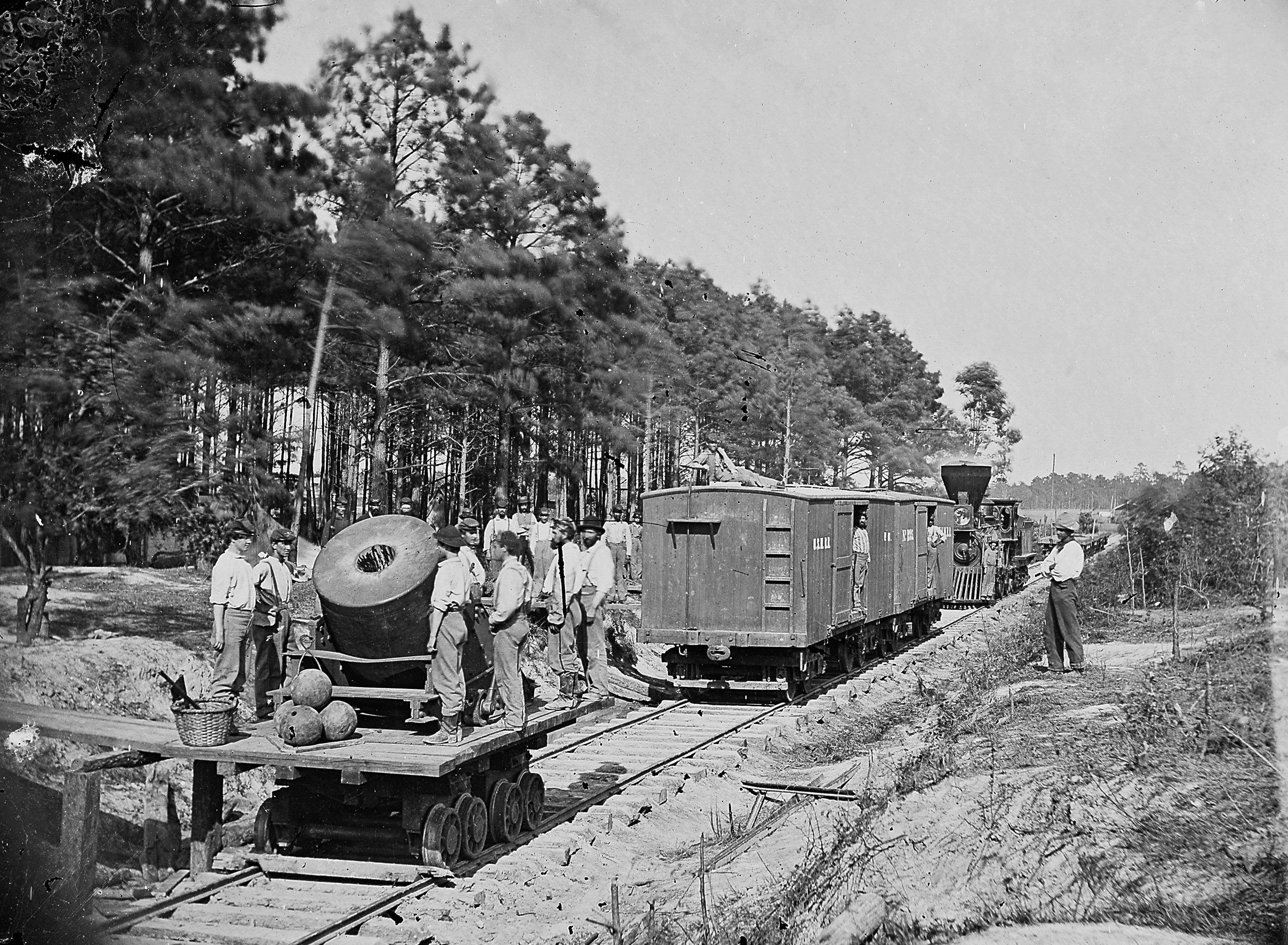
The "Dictator", Petersburg (Mathew Brady)

The first railway gun used in combat was a banded 32-pounder Brooke naval rifle mounted on a flat car and shielded by a sloping casemate of railroad iron. On 29 June 1862, Robert E. Lee had the gun pushed by a locomotive over the Richmond and York River line (later part of the Southern Railway) and used at the Battle of Savage's Station to interfere with General George McClellan's plans for siege operations against Richmond during the Union advance up the peninsula.

Photographic evidence exists of at least one Union 13-inch siege mortar mounted on a rail car during the Siege of Petersburg. It was nicknamed the Dictator or the Petersburg Express. When it was first fired, the recoil destroyed the flatcar on which it was mounted. A flatcar strengthened by additional beams covered by iron plate was able to resist recoil damage from a full charge. The Dictator was then fired from a section of the Petersburg and City Point Railroad where moving the strengthened flatcar along a curve in the track trained the gun on different targets along the Confederate lines. The Dictator silenced the Confederate guns on Chesterfield Heights to prevent them from enfilading the right end of the Union line. Another photo exists of a gun mounted on an armoured rail car with the caption of "Railway battery used in siege of Petersburg" although no textual evidence survives in support of the caption, which makes the claim that it is a photo of the Confederate gun from 1862 dubious.

==== France ====
France also used improvised railway guns during the Siege of Paris (1870–1871). In France, Lt. Col Peigné is often credited with designing the first railway gun in 1883. Commandant Mougin is credited with putting guns on rail cars in 1870. The French arms maker Schneider offered a number of models in the late 1880s and produced a 120 mm (4.7 in) gun intended for coastal defense, selling some to the Danish government in the 1890s. They also designed a 200 mm (7.9 in) model the Obusier de 200 "Pérou" sur affût-truck TAZ Schneider for Peru in 1910, but they were never delivered.

==== United Kingdom ====
The United Kingdom mounted a few 4.7 in (120 mm) guns on railway cars which saw action during the Siege and Relief of Ladysmith during the Second Boer War. A 9.2 inch gun was taken from the Cape Town coast defences and mounted on a rail car to support the British assault on Boer defenses at Belfast, north-east of Johannesburg, but the battle ended before it could get into action.

=== World War I ===
The outbreak of the First World War caught the French with a shortage of heavy field artillery. In compensation, large numbers of large static coastal defense guns and naval guns were moved to the front, but these were typically unsuitable for field use and required some kind of mounting. The railway gun provided the obvious solution. By 1916, both sides were deploying numerous types of railway guns.

==== France ====
During the First World War France produced more railway guns in more calibers and with different mountings than everyone else combined. The largest French gun produce by Schneider of France the Obusier de 520 modèle 1916, a 20-inch (520 mm) railway "Fort Buster" to do what the German 16.53-inch Big Bertha had done at the outbreak of World War I and reduce the German forts in the final line of German defenses. One was destroyed in trials and the other did not complete firing trials prior to the signing of the Armistice. The gun remained in storage and was captured by the Germans during World War II. It later formed part of the German artillery complement during the Siege of Leningrad. The gun was disabled by a premature detonation and later abandoned.

==== Germany ====
- 15 cm SK "Nathan"
- 17 cm SK L/40 i.R.L. auf Eisenbahnwagen
- 21 cm SK "Peter Adalbert"
- 24 cm SK L/30 "Theodor Otto"
- 24 cm SK L/40 "Theodor Karl"
- 28 cm K L/40 "Kurfürst"
- 28 cm SK L/40 "Bruno"
- 38 cm SK L/45 gun
- Amiens Gun
- Paris Gun

==== United States ====
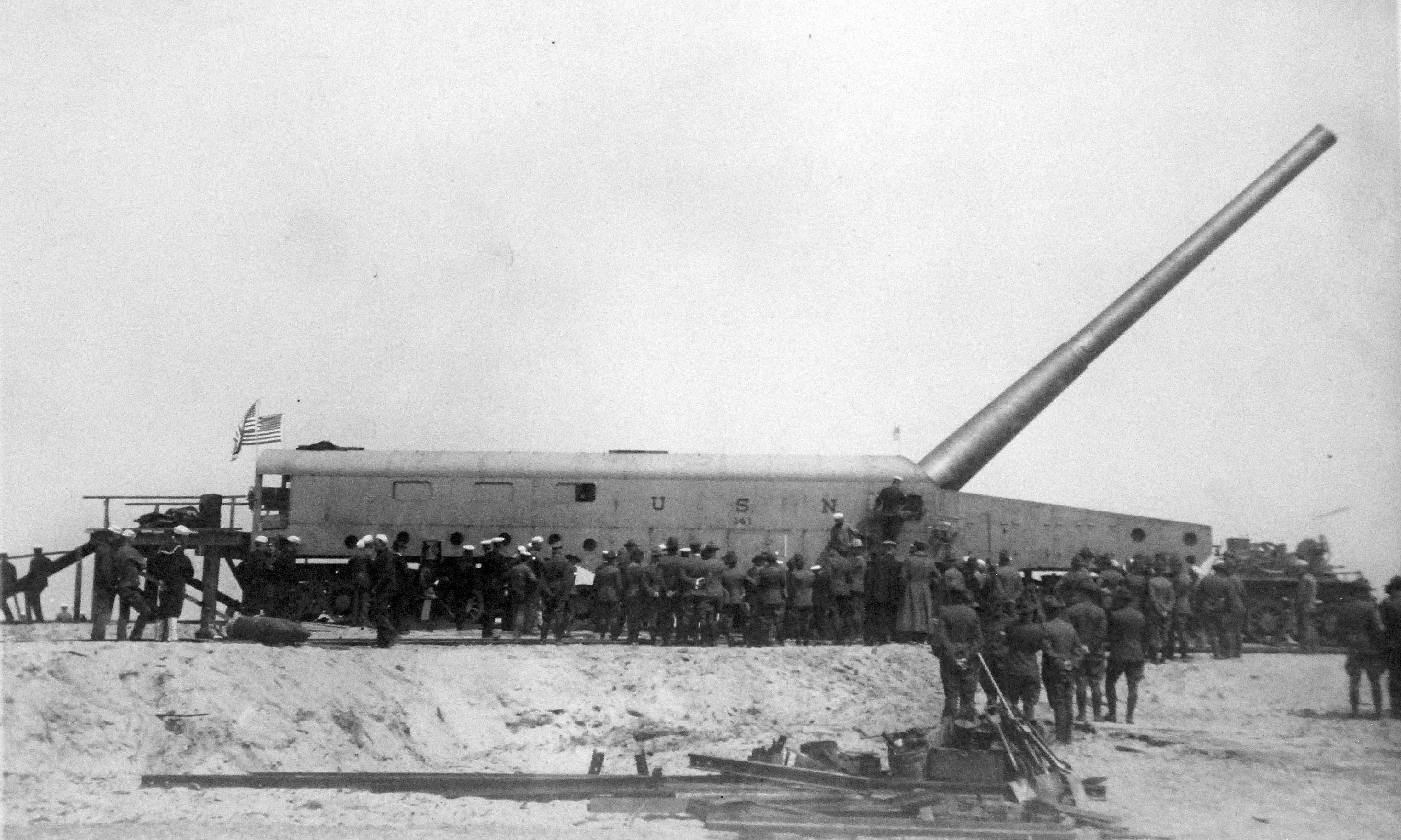
WWI era U.S. Navy 14" railway gun at Sandy Hook, New Jersey

Baldwin Locomotive Works delivered five 14"/50 caliber railway guns on trains for the United States Navy during April and May 1918. Each 14"/50 gun mounted on a 72-foot (22 m), 535,000-pound (243 t) rail carriage with four 6-wheel bogies was under the command of a United States Navy lieutenant with a standard U.S. Army 2-8-0 locomotive, a 10-ton crane car, two armored ammunition cars carrying 25 shells each, two cars carrying the recoil pit foundation materials, two fuel and workshop cars, three berthing cars, a kitchen car, a commissary car, and a medical dispensary car. A sixth locomotive pulled a headquarters car for Rear Admiral Charles Peshall Plunkett, with a machine-shop car, a spare parts car, a berthing car, a kitchen car, a commissary car, and a medical dispensary car. After delivery by ship, these trains were assembled in St. Nazaire in August and fired a total of 782 shells during 25 days on the Western Front at ranges between 27 and 36 kilometres (30,000 and 39,000 yd). Each 14-inch (36 cm) projectile weighed 1,400 pounds (640 kg) and was fired at 2,800 feet (850 m) per second. The railway carriages could elevate the guns to 43 degrees, but elevations over 15 degrees required excavation of a pit with room for the gun to recoil and structural steel shoring foundations to prevent caving of the pit sides from recoil forces absorbed by the surrounding soil. The trains moved cautiously because axle loading under the gun barrels was 50,330 pounds (22.83 t) while French railways were designed for a maximum of 39,000 pounds (18 t). These axle journals overheated at speeds of more than 10 kilometres (6.2 miles) per hour. After reaching its intended firing site and constructing the recoil pit, each gun could fire about two shells per hour. One of these guns was retained after the War as an ammunition test gun at the Dahlgren Weapons Laboratory until all United States battleships with 14"/50 guns were scrapped shortly after World War II. The gun was then placed on display outside the U.S. Navy Museum at the Washington Navy Yard.

Baldwin constructed six similar gun carriages and two of an improved Mk II type designed to permit firing the gun at all elevation angles without transferring weight to a separate foundation. These eight guns were completed too late to see combat, and were designated the 14-inch M1920 railway guns. Some were later stationed through World War II in special coast defense installations at San Pedro, California, (near Los Angeles) and in the Panama Canal Zone where they could be shifted from one ocean to the other in less than a day. Improved carriages were designed to allow their transportation to several fixed firing emplacements including concrete foundations where the railway trucks were withdrawn so the gun could be rapidly traversed (swiveled horizontally) to engage moving ship targets.

After the American entry into World War I on 6 April 1917, the U.S. Army recognized the need to adopt railway artillery for use on the Western Front. No US railway guns existed at that time. Due to low production and shipping priorities, the Army's railway gun contribution on the Western Front consisted of four U.S. Coast Artillery regiments armed with French-made weapons. Three additional railway gun regiments were in France, but did not complete training prior to the Armistice, and they did not see action. Other Coast Artillery units also operated various types of French-, British-, and American-made heavy artillery. The Army also converted some of the numerous coast artillery weapons to railway mounts. A total of 96 8-inch guns (including some from Navy spares), 129 10-inch guns, 45 12-inch guns, and 150 12-inch mortars could be spared from fixed coast defense batteries or spare stocks. Twelve 7-inch ex-Navy guns and six 12-inch guns being built for Chile were also available. None of these weapons were shipped to France except three 8-inch guns, as few of any type were completed before the Armistice. Forty-seven 8-inch railway guns were ordered, with 18 completed by the Armistice and a total of 37 (or 47, references vary) completed before the contract was canceled. Eight 10-inch railway mounts of 54 ordered were completed by the Armistice, and twelve 12-inch railway mounts were completed by 1 April 1919; the 12-inch contract was cancelled at that point. At least some of the 10-inch gun barrels were shipped to France and mounted on French-made carriages, but sources do not indicate any use of them in combat. Three railway mountings for the Chilean 12-inch guns were ready for shipment by the Armistice, and the remaining three barrels were kept as spares. A total of twenty-two 10-inch guns were eventually mounted. Ninety-one 12-inch railway mortars were ordered, with 45 complete by 7 April 1919 and the remainder eventually completed.

The 7-inch and 8-inch guns and 12-inch mortars used a common carriage, with a depressed center and two 4-wheel or 6-wheel bogies. The bogies were interchangeable for standard-gauge or (with 12-wheel bogies) 60-cm (23.6-inch) gauge track. Outriggers and a rotating mount allowed all-around fire. This allowed the weapons to be used in coast defense against moving targets. The 8-inch guns and 12-inch mortars were kept on railway mountings after the war, while almost all of the 7-inch, 10-inch, and 12-inch guns were returned to the coastal forts. With 47 available, plus an additional 24 ex-Navy Mark VI guns on railway mounts by 1942, the 8-inch guns were the most-commonly-deployed American railway gun through World War II. About 12 of these were used for the defense of Oahu, Hawaii. Others were stationed for the coastal defense of Manila (eventually dismounted from the railway carriage at Corregidor), Bermuda, Newfoundland, Puget Sound, Chesapeake Bay, Delaware Bay, and Fort Hancock, New Jersey (near New York City).

Although numerous 12-inch railway mortars were available, few were deployed. In 1930 the US Army tested them at Fort Hancock, New Jersey, and Fort Miles, Delaware. During World War II, four railway mortars were among the temporary harbor defenses of Grays Harbor, Washington state, and emplacements for an additional four at Cape George, Washington, were constructed, but never armed. Of the more than 250 railway guns built in the United States from 1916 to 1942, the five navy 14"/50 guns that were sent to France during World War I and possibly two 8-inch guns in the Philippines were the only ones ever to be used in combat. Reportedly, the eight 8-inch railway guns in the Philippines in 1941–42 were either destroyed by air attack or lacked trained crews.

=== World War II ===
World War II saw the final use of the railway gun. This included the massive 80 cm (31 in) Schwerer Gustav gun, the largest artillery piece to be used in combat, deployed by Nazi Germany. After the Fall of France Germany added 58 captured French guns to its inventory while Italy was given 19 French guns with many of these being captured by the Germans after the Italian capitulation.

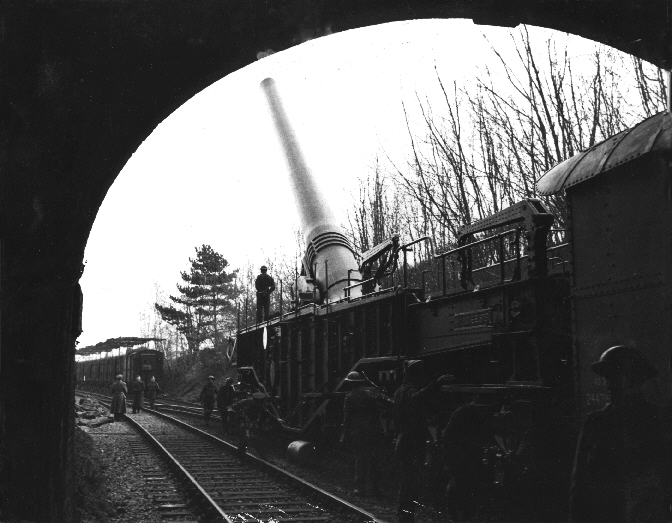
Boche Buster, seen from Bourne Park Tunnel on the Elham Valley line, at Bishopsbourne in Kent, England, on 21 March 1941

Both Nazi Germany and Great Britain deployed railway guns that were capable of firing across the English Channel in the areas around Dover and Calais. The Wehrmacht deployed three 40.6-cm (16-inch) guns. The British Army deployed three 13.5-inch (34.3-cm) railway guns on the East Kent Light Railway, locating them around Lydden and Shepherdswell. These were codenamed the "Gladiator", the "Sceneshifter", and the "Peacemaker". 9.2-inch Mark 13 guns were located near Canterbury and Hythe, Kent; and 12-inch howitzers, Mk 3 and 5, located around Guston, north of Dover on the Southern Railway line to Deal and Ramsgate.

The 18-inch howitzer "Boche Buster" was sited on the Elham Valley Railway, between Bridge, Kent, and Lyminge, and was intended for coastal defense against invasion. It was not capable of cross-channel firing, having a maximum range of only about 20 km (12 miles).

The IJA (Imperial Japanese Army) employed one railway gun, the Type 90 240 mm railway gun, which served as a coastal battery in the Tokyo bay, and was then stationed in Manchukuo, in the area of Heilongjiang. It was destroyed by the retreating Kwantung Army when the Soviets invaded Manchuria in late 1945.

== Surviving railway guns ==
- An 11.2" or 28 cm railway gun is preserved at the Australian War Memorial, Canberra, ACT, Australia. It was captured by the AIF at Amiens in 1918 and is commonly known as the "Amiens Gun".
- In the United Kingdom, a BL 18 inch Howitzer barrel survives. This was constructed too late to see service in World War I; it was put into service during World War II, but never saw action. In September 2013 it was moved to the Royal Armouries artillery museum at Fort Nelson, Hampshire.
- A 12" railway gun is preserved at the United States Army Ordnance Museum, Fort Lee, Virginia, United States.
- A US Navy 14"/50 caliber railway gun from World War I is preserved at the Washington Navy Yard, Washington DC, United States.
- A German 283 mm Krupp K5 gun ("Anzio Annie") is displayed at the United States Army Ordnance Museum, Fort Lee, Virginia. It was constructed using parts from two German guns that shelled the Anzio beachhead and were partially destroyed by their crews before being captured by the Allies.

A second 283 mm Krupp K5 can be seen at the Todt Battery museum, near Audinghen in northern France.

- Soviet-era 305 mm MK-3-12 guns are preserved at the Krasnaya Gorka fort near Lomonosov, Russia, and the Museum of Railway Technology, Saint Petersburg.
- Soviet 180 mm ТМ-1-180 guns may be seen at Krasnaya Gorka fort, at the Museum of the Great Patriotic War, Moscow, and at the Railway Station in Sevastopol, Ukraine.
- The last surviving American-made 7-inch (178 mm) railway gun is now on display at Museu Militar Conde de Linhares in Rio de Janeiro, Brazil.
- A Model 1918 railroad car mount for a 12-inch seacoast mortar is located at the Chehalis-Centralia RR of Chehalis, WA. These cars were built in the early 1920s to make obsolete seacoast artillery more mobile. Most guns of this type were scrapped in the early days of WWII.
- There is an 8-inch gun on an M1918 Railway Mount at the University of Tampa, Tampa, FL.

== Images ==
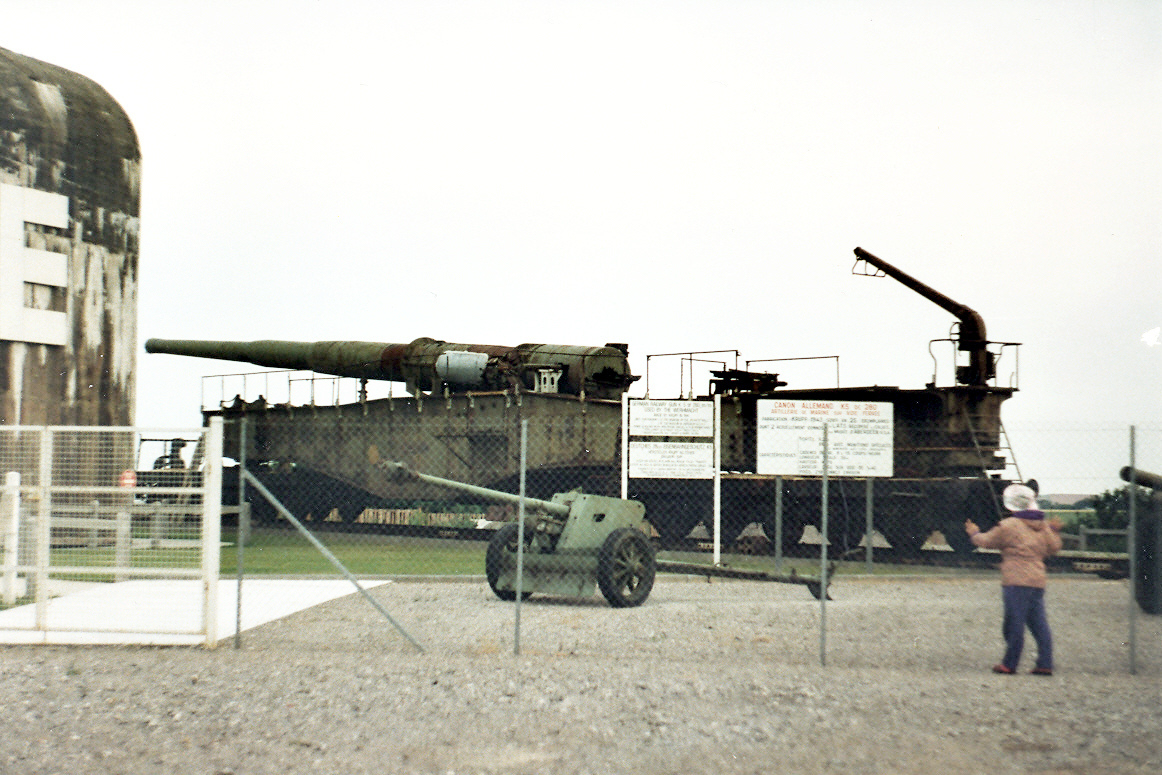
Krupp K5, Todt Battery Museum, France

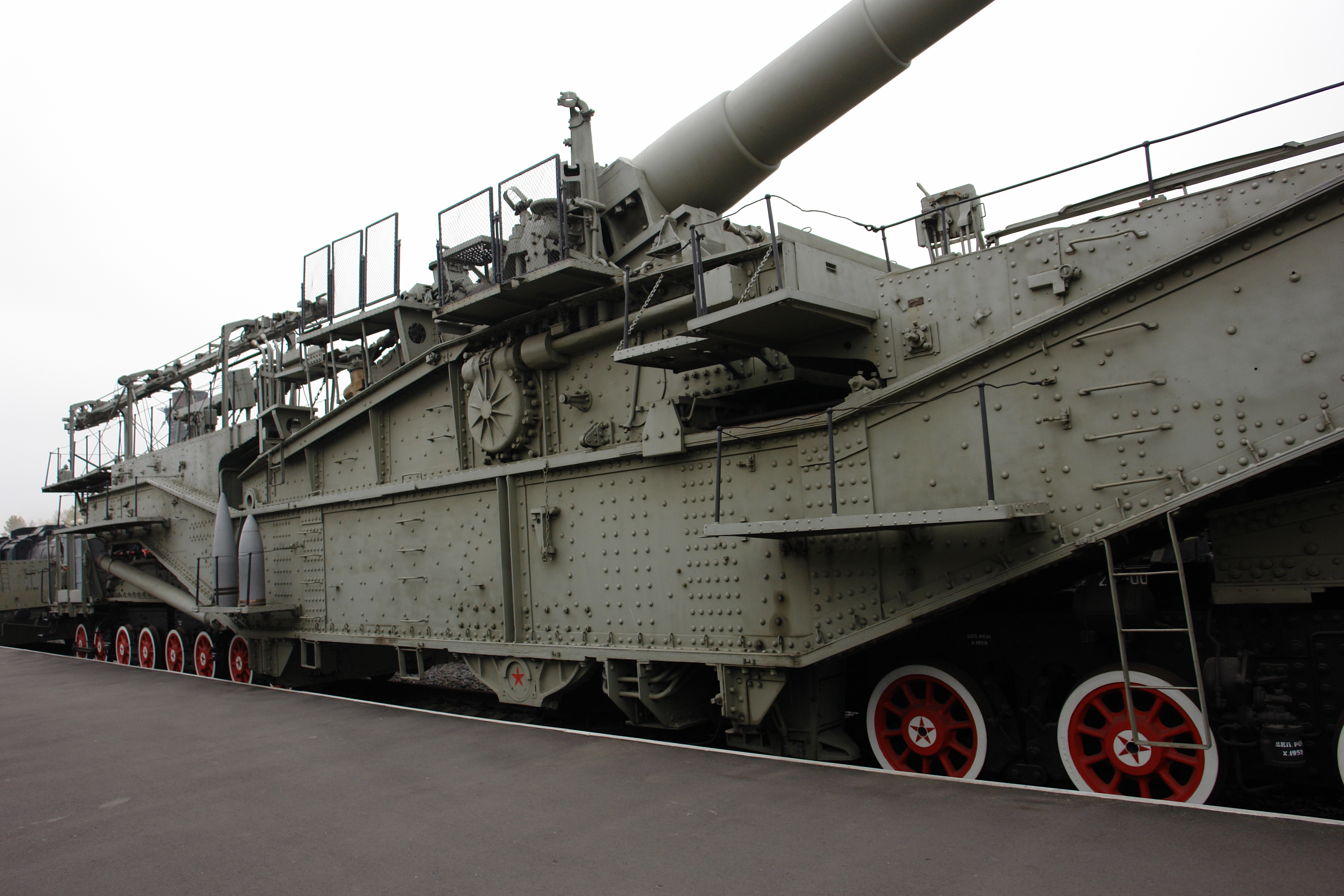
MK-3-12, at the Central Museum of Railway Transport, Russian Federation, at Varshavsky Rail Terminal, St.Petersburg

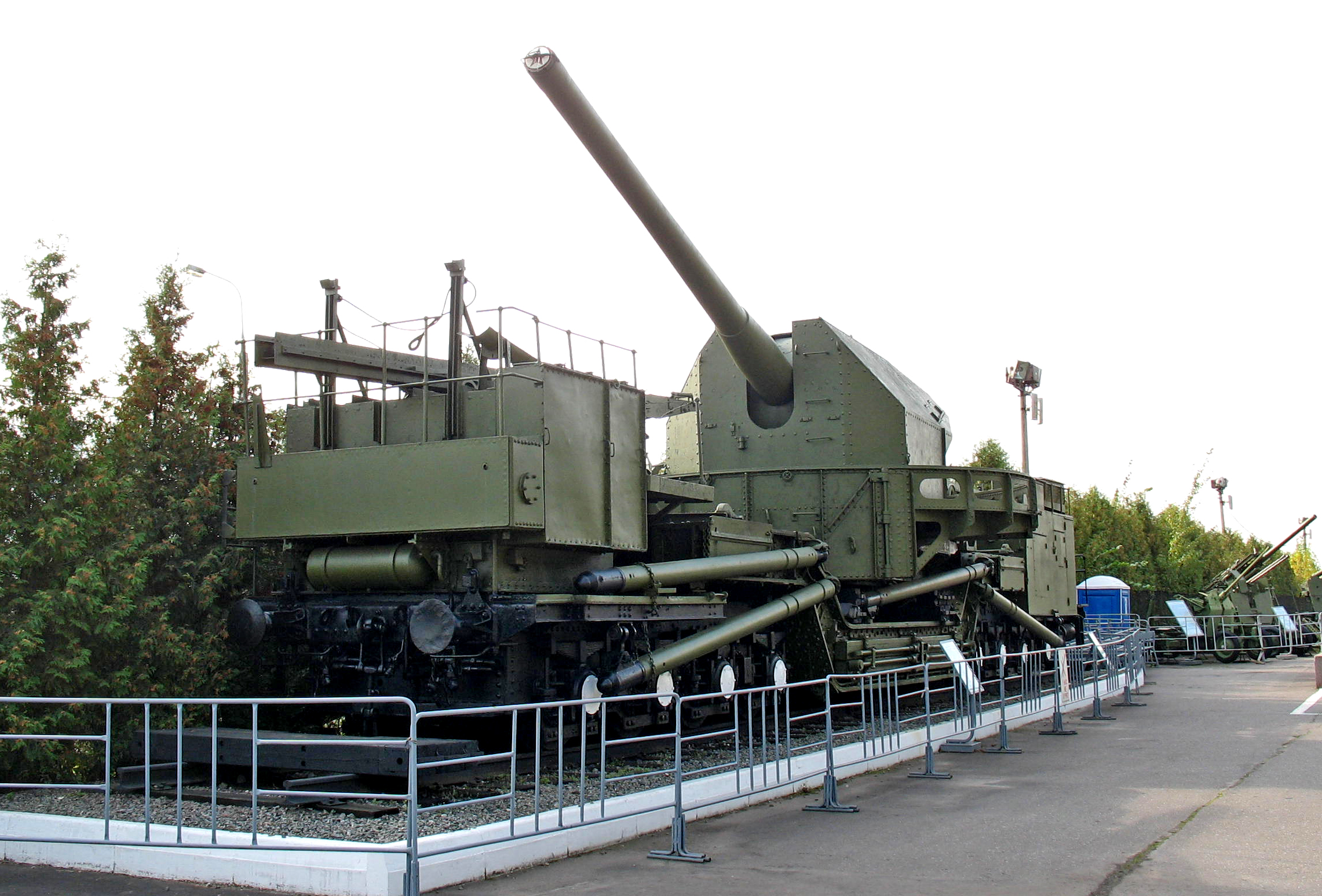
TM-1-180 at the Moscow Victory park Museum of the Great Patriotic War

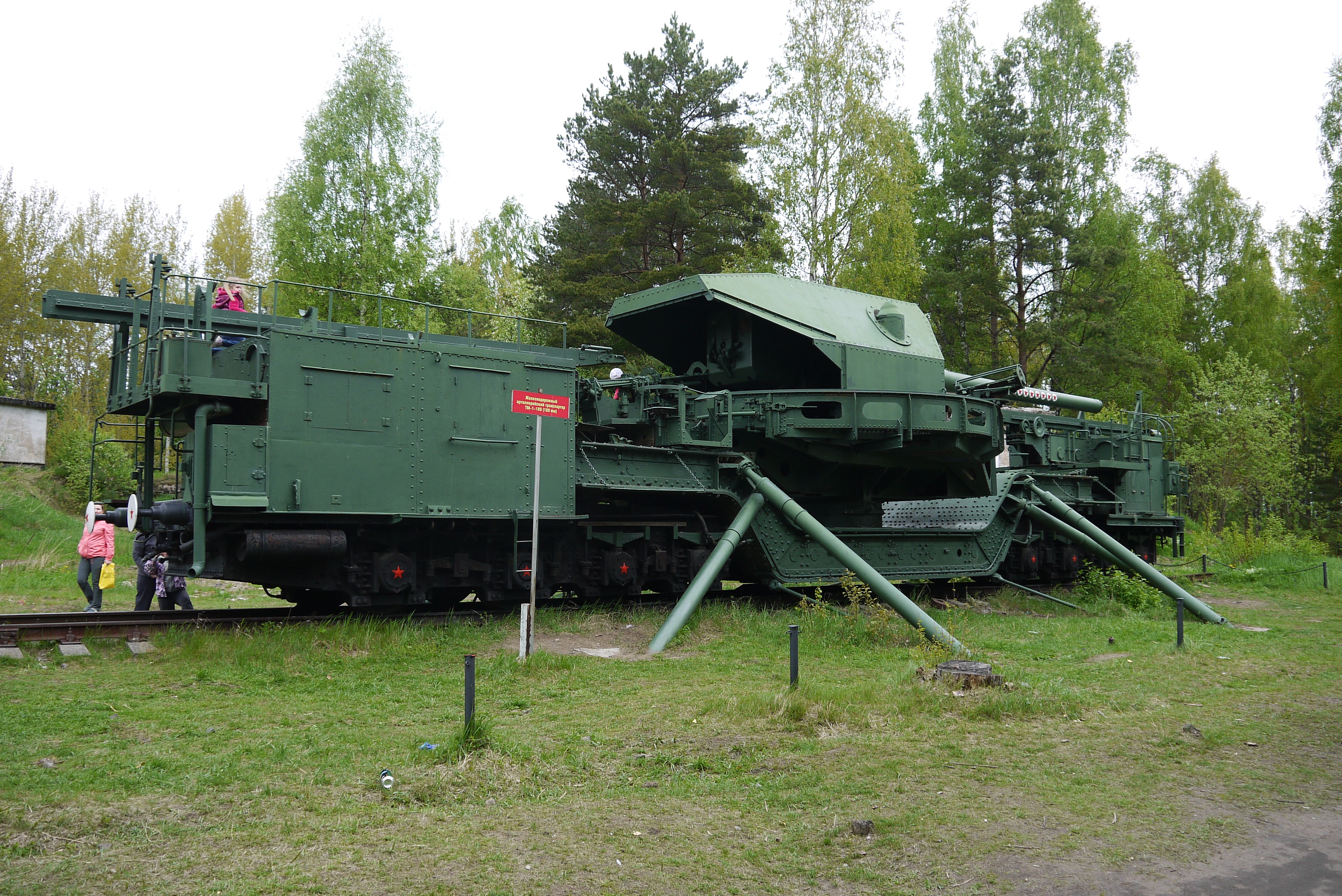
TM-1-180, Krasnaya Gorka fort

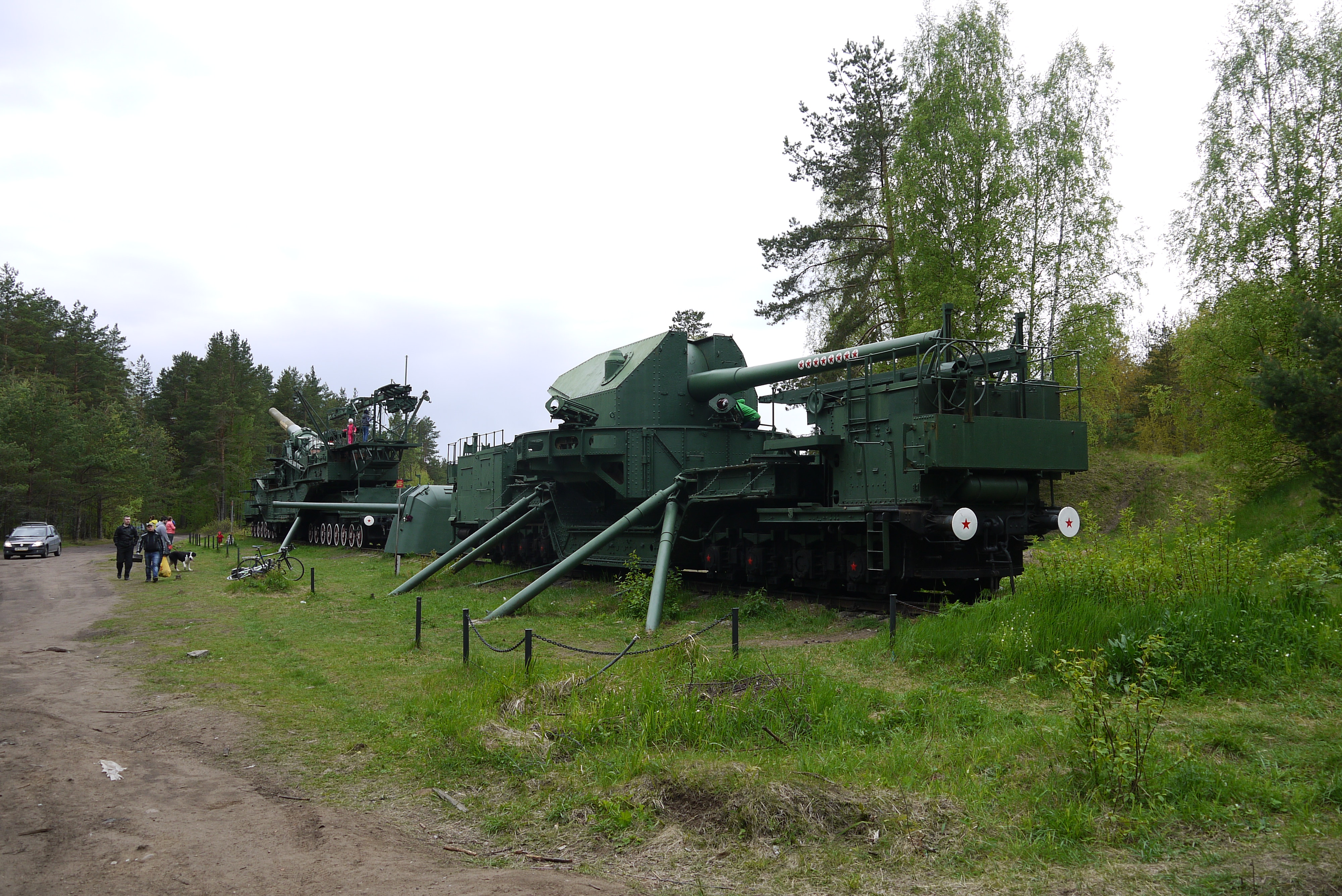
TM-1-180 and TM-3-12 Krasnaya Gorka fort

Model used by the IJA (Imperial Japanese Army) designated as the type 90 240mm railway gun. Photograph taken in France

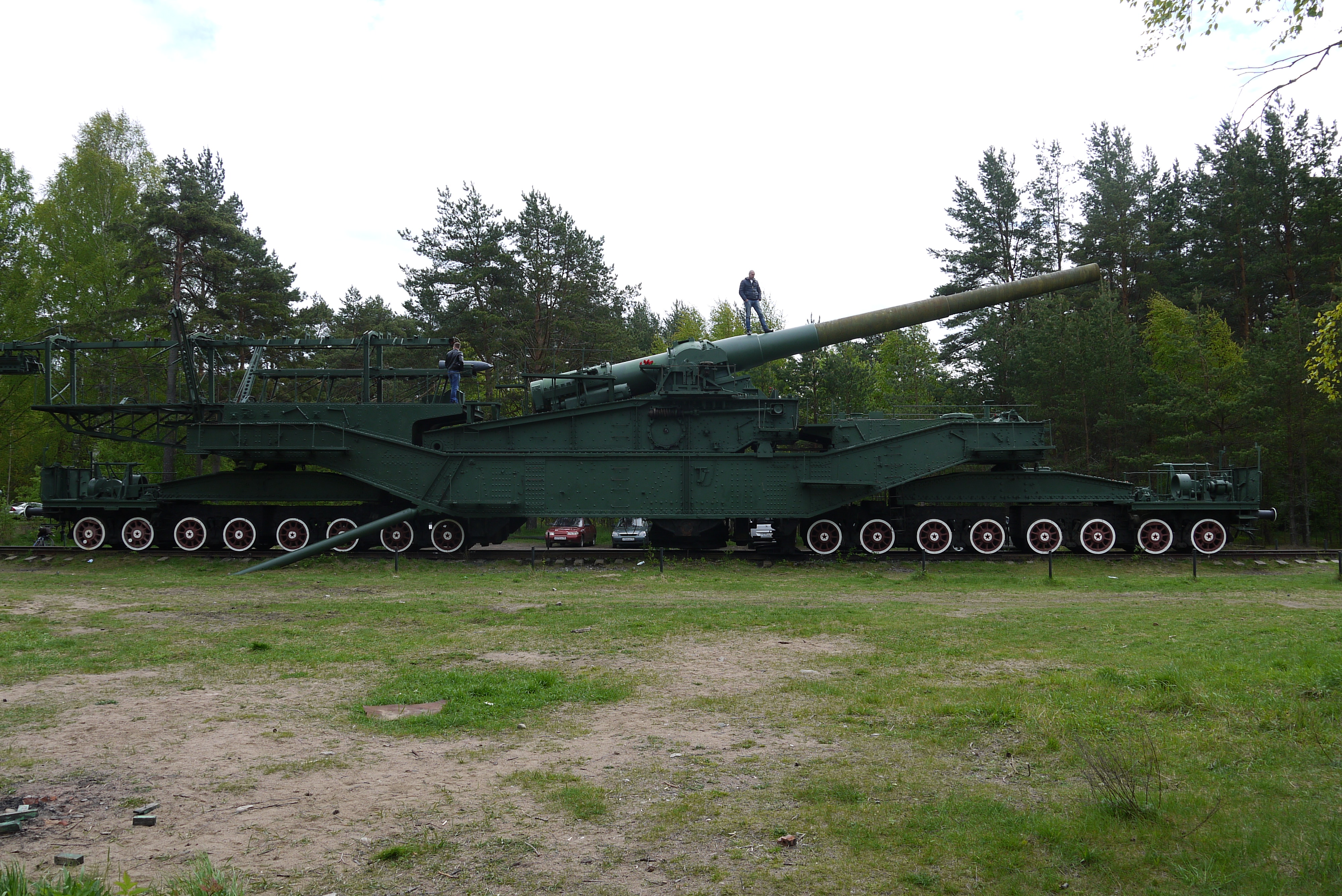
TM-3-12 Krasnaya Gorka fort

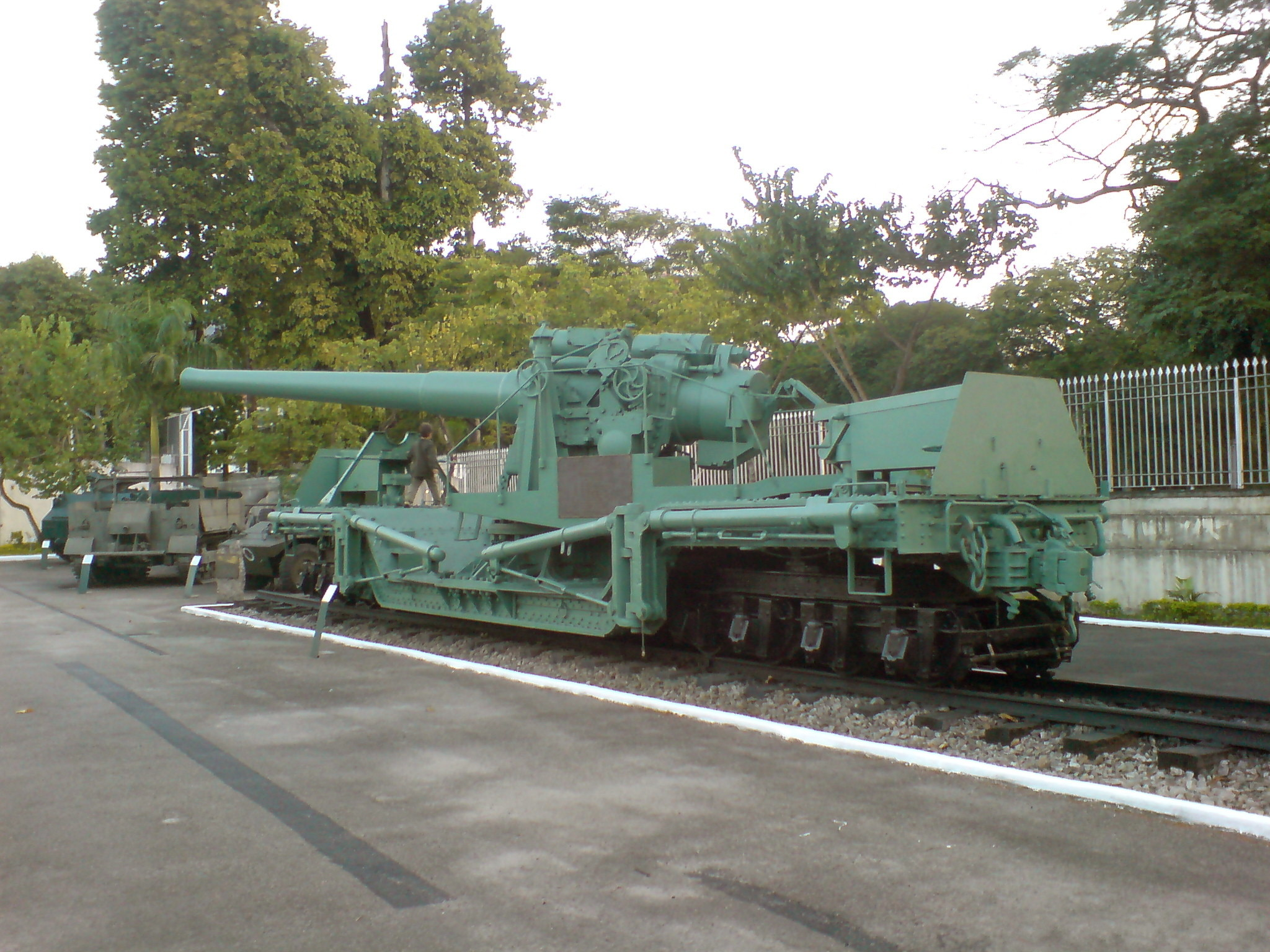
Bethlehem Steel 7-inch (178 mm) railway gun, Museu Militar Conde de Linhares, Brazil

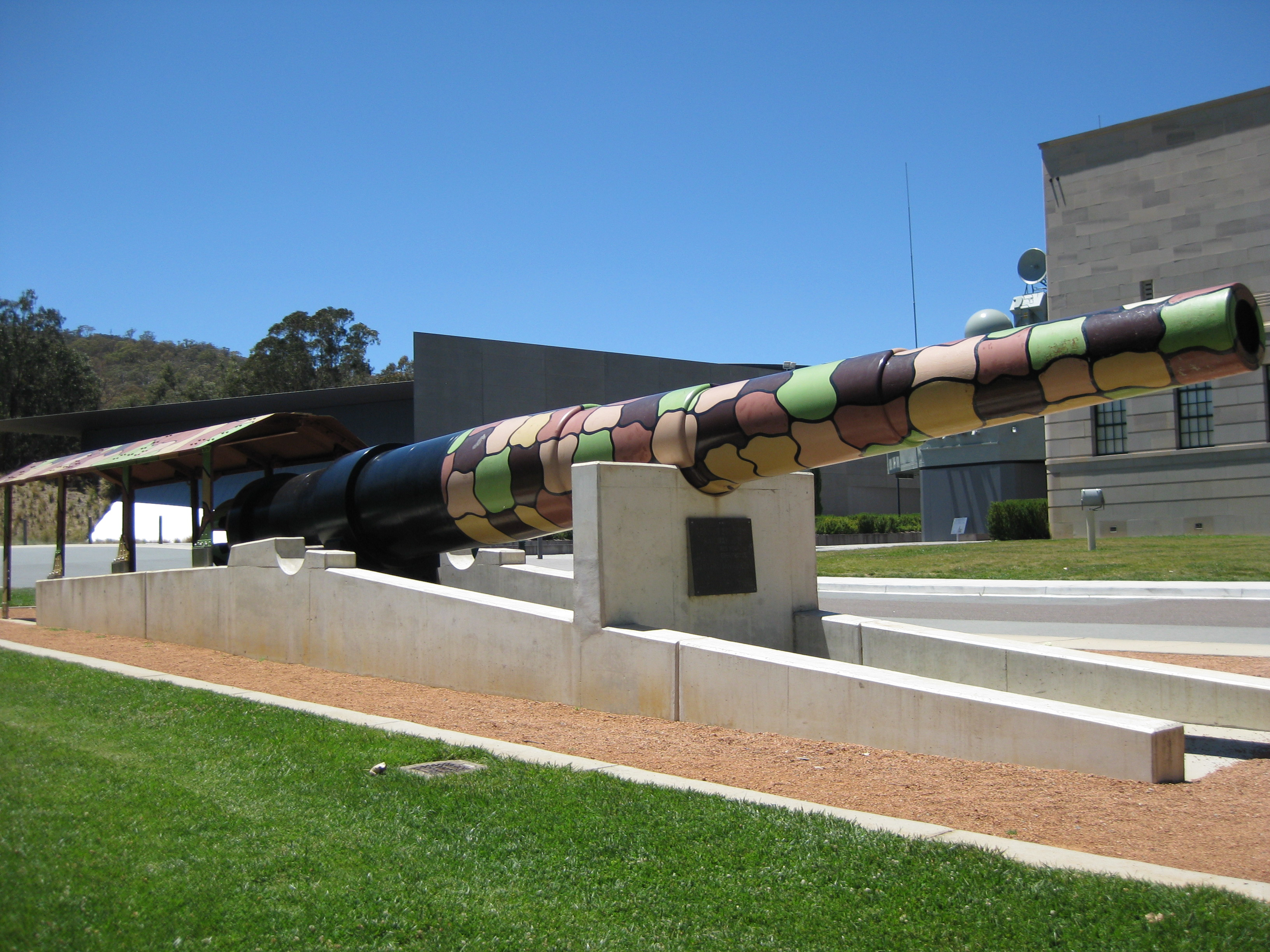
Barrel of German 28 cm Bruno from World War I, at the Australian War Memorial, Canberra

== See also ==
- List of railway artillery

== Bibliography ==
- Arnold, Colonel B. E. (1982). Conflict Across the Strait: A Battery Commander's Story of Kent's Defences 1939–45. Dover: Crabwell Publications / Buckland Publications. ISBN 0-906124-06-9.
- Berhow, Mark A., ed. (2004). American Seacoast Defenses, A Reference Guide (Second ed.). CDSG Press. ISBN 0-9748167-0-1.
- Breyer, Siegfried (1973). Battleships and Battle Cruisers 1905–1970. Garden City, New York: Doubleday. ISBN 978-0-356-04191-9.
- Campbell, John (1985). Naval Weapons of World War Two. Annapolis, Maryland: Naval Institute Press. ISBN 0-87021-459-4.
- Doyle, David (2011). K5(E) Railgun – Detail in Action. Carollton, Texas, United States: Squadron Signal Publications. ISBN 978-0-89747-635-5.
- Engelmann, Joachim (1976). Armor in Action – German Railroad Guns. Squadron/Signal Publications. ISBN 0-89747-048-6.
- Hall, D Major. Military History Journal The South African Military History Society. - Vol 2 No 3 June 1972. Guns in South Africa 1899–1902 Part V and VI
- Hogg, Ian V. (2005). Allied Artillery of World War One. Crowood Press. ISBN 1-86126-712-6.
- Jäger, Herbert (2001). German Artillery of World War One. Crowood Press. ISBN 1-86126-403-8.
- Lewis, Emanuel Raymond (1979). Seacoast Fortifications of the United States. Annapolis, Maryland: Leeward Publications. ISBN 978-0-929521-11-4.
- Many, Seymour B. (April 1965). "He Made No Complaint". United States Naval Institute Proceedings.
- Miller, H. W., Lt. Col. Railway Artillery: A Report on the Characteristics, Scope of Utility, Etc., of Railway Artillery, Volumes I and II Washington: Government Print Office, 1921
- Phillips, Lance (1965). Yonder comes the Train. Cranbury, New Jersey: A.S. Barnes and Company. ISBN 0-498-06303-8.
- Robbins, Charles B. & Lewis, E. R. (2000). "The Chilean-American 12-inch Gun". Warship International. XXXVII (2): 184–190.
- Westing, Fred (1966). The Locomotives that Baldwin Built. Bonanza Books.
- Zaloga, Steven J & Dennis, Peter (2016). Railway Guns of World War II. Oxford, UK: Osprey Publishing. ISBN 978-1-4728-1068-7.
