= Type 90 240 mm railway gun =

- The Schneider/Saint-Chamond gun in France. The gun is in its traveling position.
- Type: Railway gun
- Place of origin: Empire of Japan

Service history
- In service: 1930–1945
- Used by: Imperial Japanese Army
- Wars: World War II

Production history
- Manufacturer: Schneider
- Produced: 1930
- No. built: 1

Specifications
- Mass: 136 t (149.9 short tons)
- Barrel length: 12.83 m (42 ft 1 in)
- Caliber: 240 mm (9.4 in)
- Carriage: Railcar with 2 × 6 wheeled bogeys
- Elevation: 0 to +50 degrees
- Traverse: 360 degrees
- Muzzle velocity: 1,050 m/s (3,400 ft/s)
- Effective firing range: 50 km (31 mi)

The Type 90 240 mm railway gun (九〇式二十四糎列車加農, Kyūrei-shiki nijyūyon-miri Resshahō) was a large caliber railroad gun acquired by the Imperial Japanese Army from the French arms manufacturer Schneider in 1930. The Type 90 designation was given to this gun as it was accepted in the year 2590 of the Japanese calendar (1930). It was the only railroad gun in Japanese service.

== History and development ==
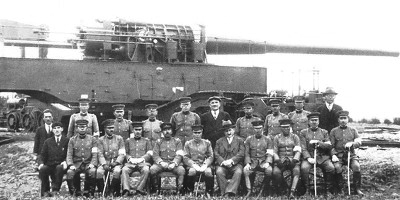
The Type 90 240-mm-Railway Gun, with members of the Imperial Japanese Army and staff of the French Schneider-Creusot company from which Japan purchased the gun.

The Imperial Japanese army had made extensive use of armoured trains since the Russo-Japanese War, and Japanese military advisors in Europe during World War I had noted the development of railway guns, whereby extremely large caliber weapons, such as previously found only on battleships, could be made mobile and could be rapidly deployed to front-line combat areas.

However, despite this interest, other projects had higher priority, and nothing was done until funding was found to purchase a single sample unit from Schneider in France in 1930. Only the gun body (barrel with a breech-lock) was purchased from Schneider, and the railway carriage and auxiliary equipment was all produced locally in Japan. The completed assembly was designated as the Type 90 240mm railway gun.

The gun itself was not, strictly, a Schneider gun. It was designed by FAMH (Saint-Chamond) as part of the French TLP (très longue portée, “very long range”) projects. Approval for the Saint-Chamond long range gun was granted in November 1918 and the gun was tested in 1926. The maximum range achieved was 59,000m with a 240mm L/51 barrel. The Saint-Chamond gun was unusual for a large calibre railway gun because it was designed with 360° traverse on a carriage which had an auxiliary engine which gave limited autonomy to the railway gun. The firm of Schneider et Cie had taken over FAMH in 1924 and since Schneider had its own TLP projects the Saint-Chamond design became superfluous.

== Combat record ==
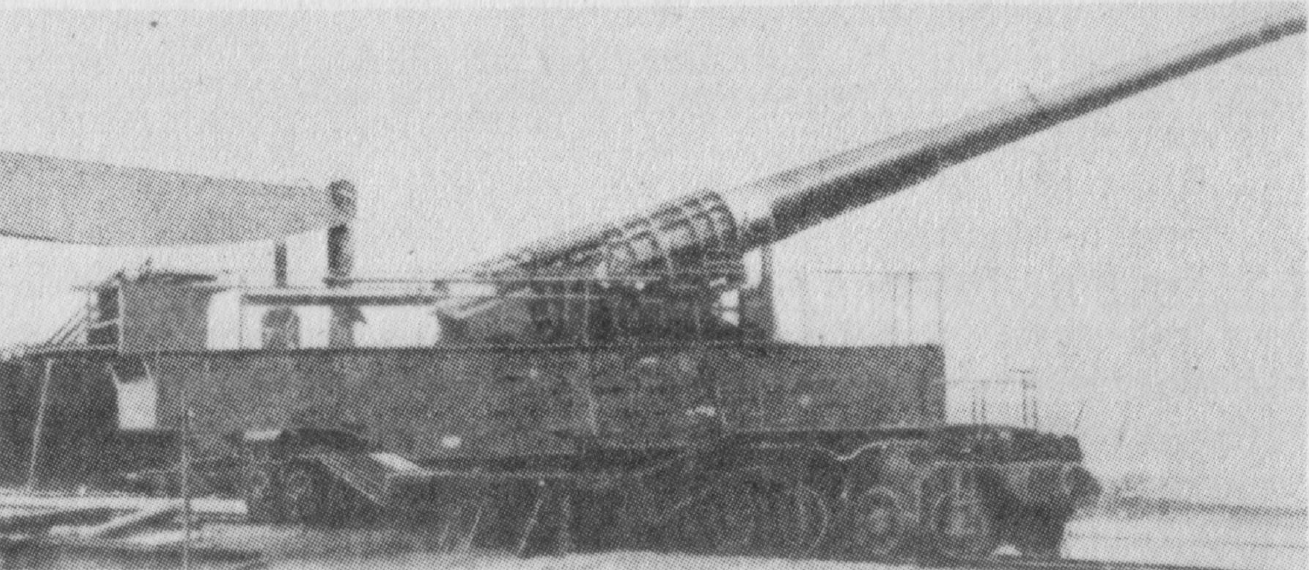
Japanese 24 cm Railway gun

The Type 90 240mm Railway Gun was initially deployed as a coastal artillery battery at Futtsu, Chiba, as part of the defenses guarding the entrance to Tokyo Bay. It was redeployed to Manchukuo in 1941, and based in the Hulin area of Heilongjiang, as part of the defenses against the Soviet Union, where it remained for the duration of World War II. When the Soviet Union invaded Manchukuo in the closing days of the war, the gun was destroyed by retreating Kwantung Army forces and abandoned.
