= BL 12-inch railway howitzer =

Ordnance BL 12-inch Howitzer Mk I, III, V on truck, railway
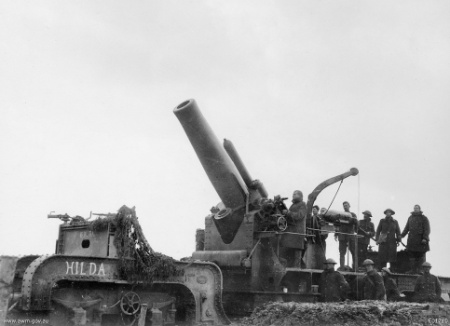
- Mk. I "Hilda" in action, Ypres, 7 November 1917
- Type: Railway howitzer
- Place of origin: United Kingdom

Service history
- In service: 1916–1940
- Used by: United Kingdom
- Wars: First World War

Production history
- Designer: Elswick Ordnance Company
- Manufacturer: Elswick Ordnance Company
- No. built: 81
- Variants: Mk I, III, V (Note: Mk I = Mark 1, Mk III = Mark 3, Mk V = Mark 5. Britain used Roman numerals to denote Marks (i.e. models) of ordnance until after World War II. Hence this article covers the first, third and fifth models of British 12-inch howitzers. Mks II and IV were the unrelated BL 12-inch siege howitzer.)

Specifications
- Barrel length: Mk I: 12 ft (3.7 m); Mk III & V: 17 ft 3 in (5.26 m)
- Shell: HE; 750 lb (340 kg)
- Calibre: 12-inch (305 mm)
- Elevation: Mk I & III: 40° - 65° Mk V: 20° - 65°
- Traverse: Mk I & III: 20° L & R Mk V: 120° L & R
- Muzzle velocity: Mk I: 1,175 ft/s (358 m/s); Mk III & V: 1,468 ft/s (447 m/s)
- Effective firing range: Mk I: 11,132 yd (10,179 m); Mk III: 15,000 yd (14,000 m); Mk V: 14,350 yd (13,120 m)
- Filling weight: 83lb 3oz (37.96 kg) Amatol

The British Ordnance BL 12 inch howitzer on truck, railway, a type of railway gun, was developed following the success of the 9.2-inch siege howitzer. It was similar but unrelated to the 12-inch siege howitzers Mk II and IV.

== Design and development ==
=== Mark I ===
Mk I was introduced from March 1916. It is identified by its short barrel and recuperator above the barrel.

=== Mark III ===
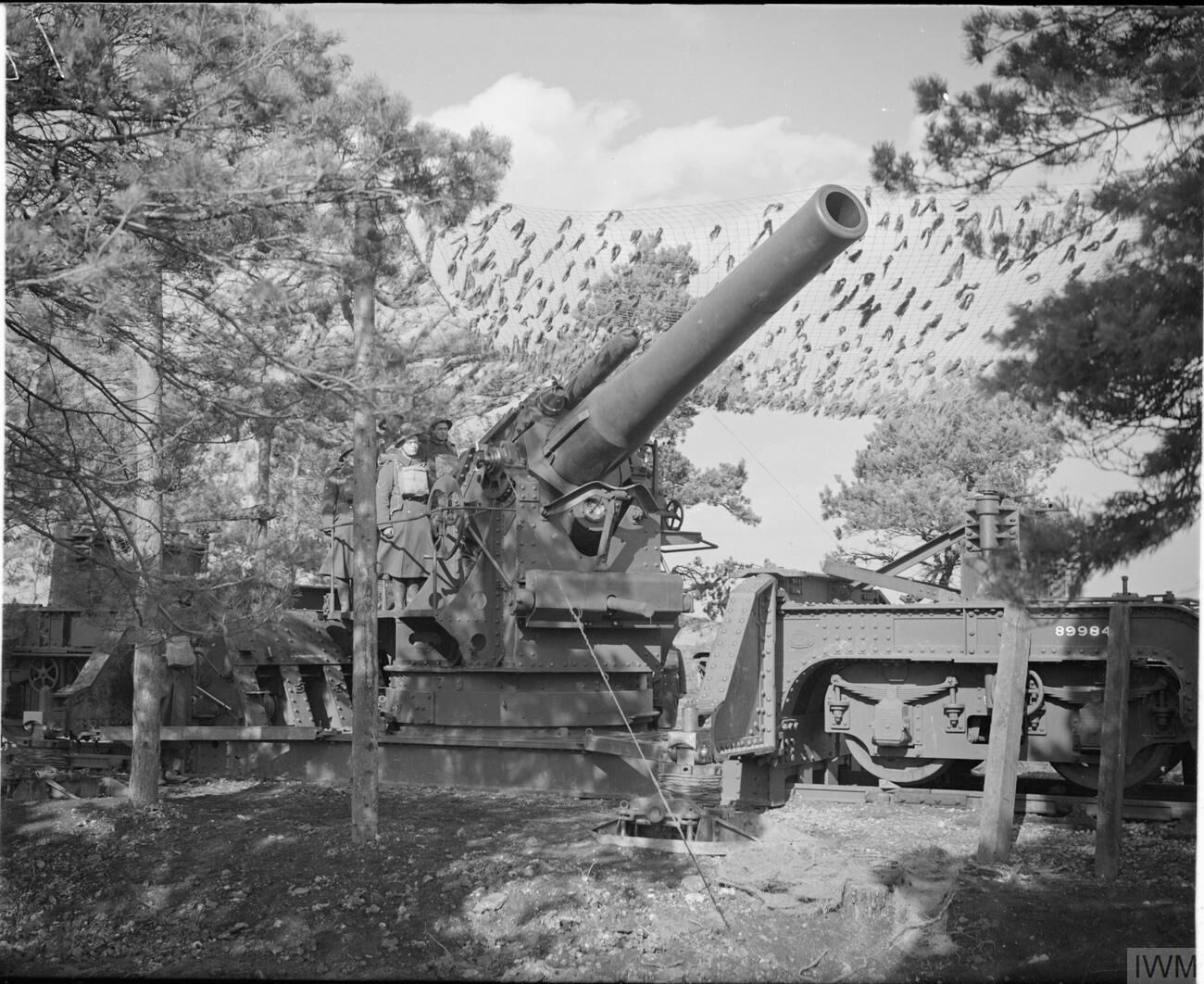
Mk III at Wareham, Dorset, 26 February 1941

The longer-barrelled Mk III soon followed, with a heavier breech to balance the gun. It retained the recuperator above the barrel.

=== Mark V ===
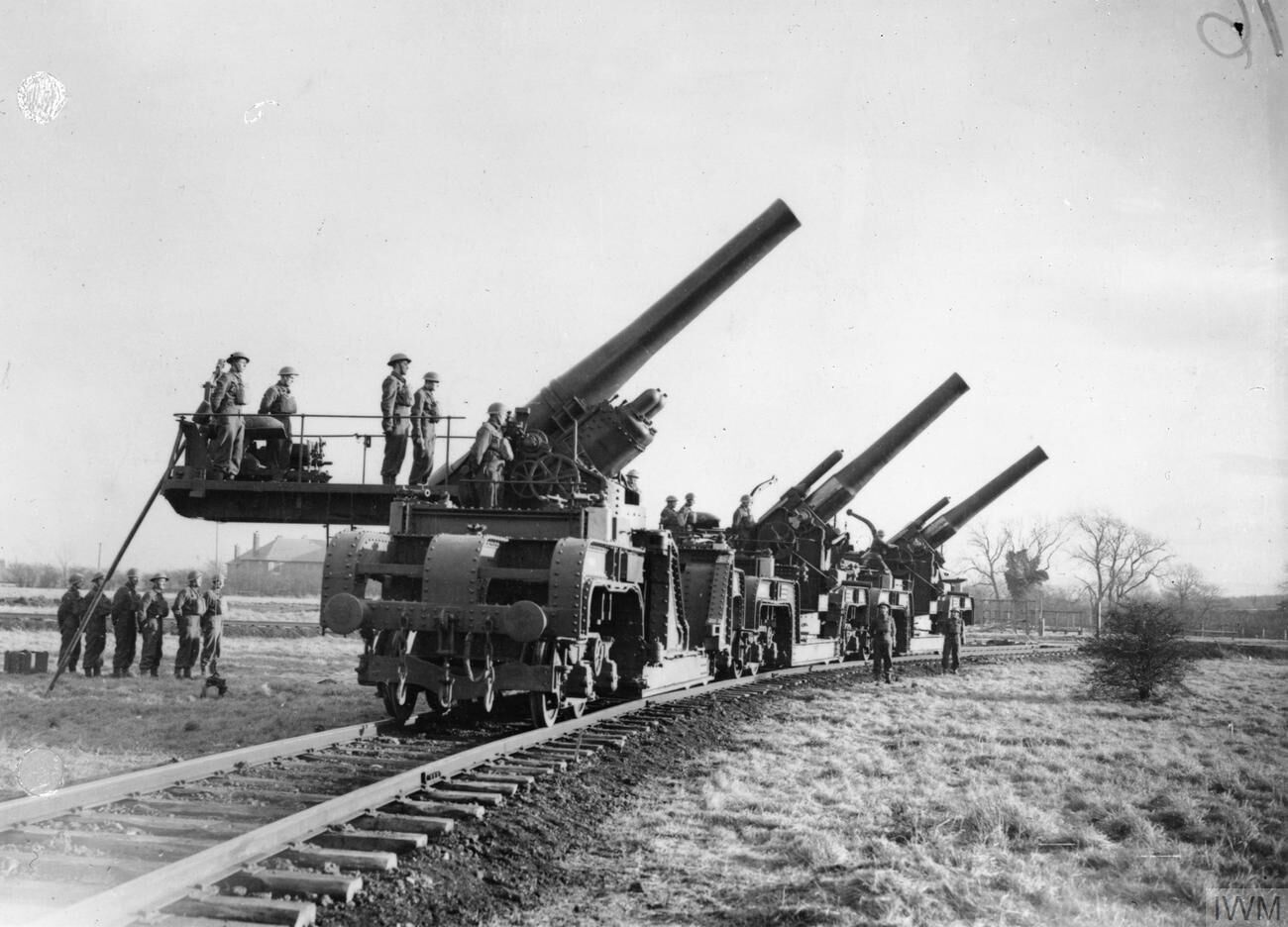
One Mk V (foreground) and two Mk IIIs, Catterick UK, 12 December 1940

Mk V, dating from July 1917, moved the recoil buffer and recuperator into a single housing below the barrel, which was common for all new British artillery developed during World War I. It also had a lighter breech with the gun balanced by the redesigned recoil system and altered gun positioning on the cradle. Mk V also relocated the loading platform from the railway wagon to the revolving gun mounting, which now allowed 120° of traverse, and by overhanging the opposite side provided crew access when the gun fired to the side (90° traverse) and also helped to balance it.

== Combat service ==
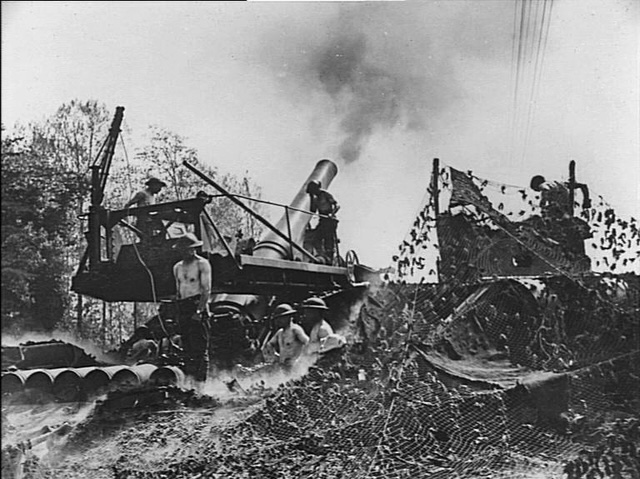
Mk V in action at Soissons, France, 19 May 1918

All 3 versions served on the Western Front in World War I, usually in 2-gun batteries, operated by the Royal Garrison Artillery.

Mk III and MK V were deployed for the home defence of Great Britain in World War II.

== Ammunition ==
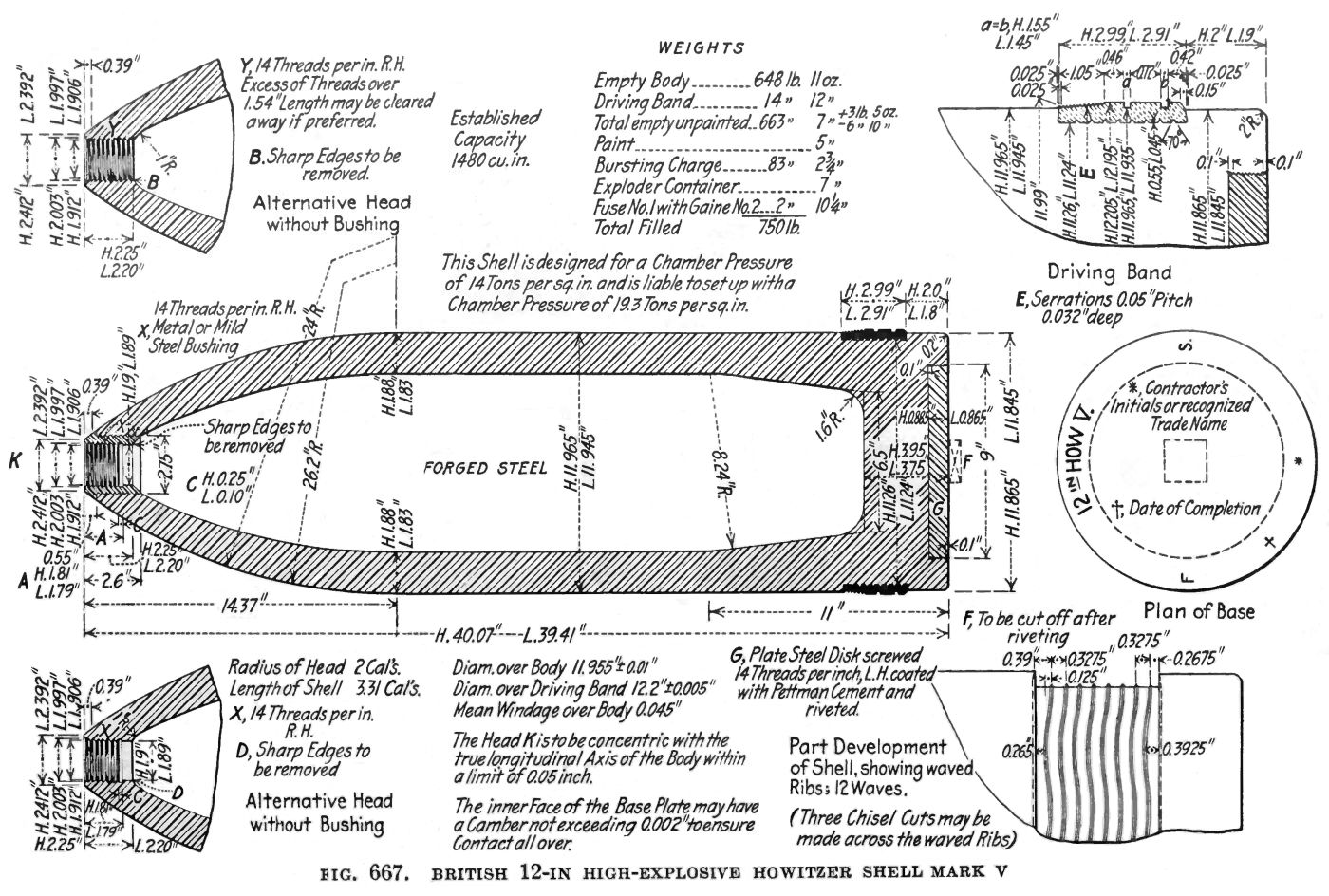
Mk V HE shell, WWI

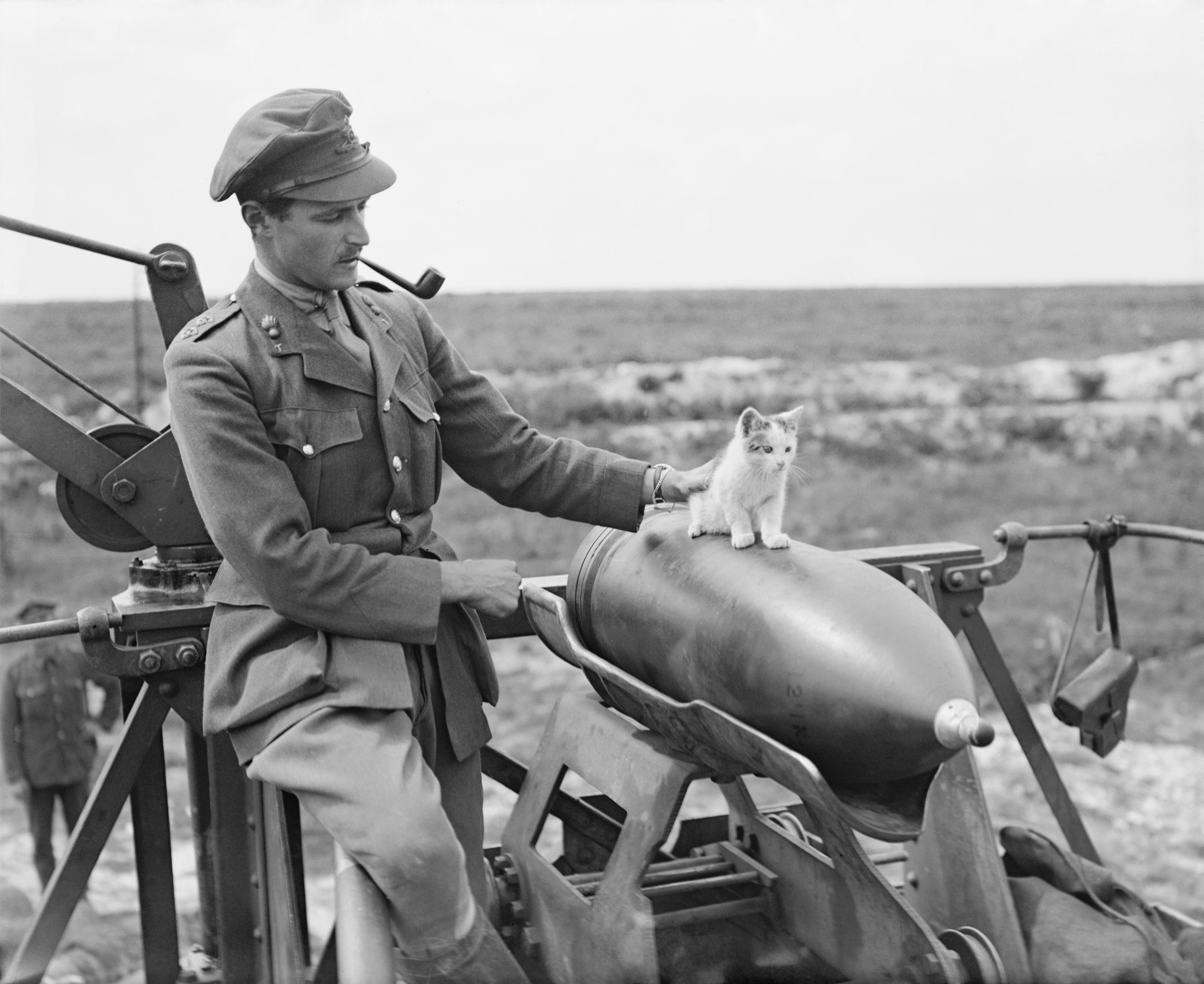
Officer of 444 Siege Battery and kitten, Mk V howitzer, near Arras 19 July 1918

== See also ==
- List of railway artillery

== Bibliography ==
- Dale Clarke, British Artillery 1914-1919. Heavy Artillery. Osprey Publishing, Oxford UK, 2005 ISBN 1-84176-788-3
- I.V. Hogg & L.F. Thurston, British Artillery Weapons & Ammunition 1914–1918. London: Ian Allan, 1972.
