= 24 cm SK L/40 "Theodor Karl" =

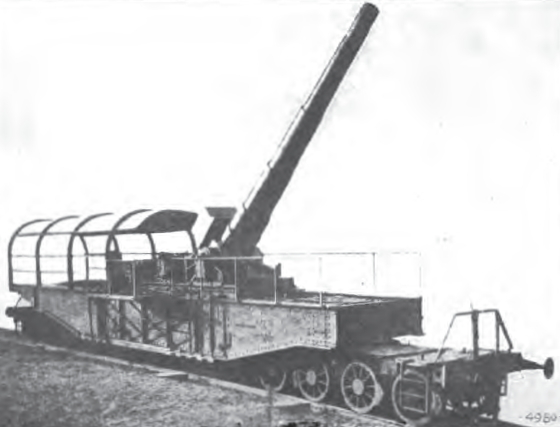
- One of four "Theodor Karls" on a railroad mount
- Type: Railroad gun
- Place of origin: German Empire

Service history
- In service: 1916—45
- Used by: German Empire; Belgium; Nazi Germany
- Wars: World War I World War II

Production history
- Designer: Krupp
- Designed: 1915—16
- Manufacturer: Krupp
- Produced: 1916—17
- No. built: 34

Specifications
- Mass: 116.9 tonnes (115.1 long tons; 128.9 short tons) (Bettungsscheissgerüst); 103.3 tonnes (101.7 long tons; 113.9 short tons) (E. u. B.); 110.2 tonnes (108.5 long tons; 121.5 short tons) (Eisenbahnlafette)
- Barrel length: 8.866 metres (29 ft 1 in) L/40
- Shell: separate-loading, cased charge
- Caliber: 238 millimetres (9.4 in)
- Breech: horizontal sliding-wedge
- Recoil: hydro-pneumatic
- Carriage: 2 x 4-axle trucks
- Elevation: +0° to 45°
- Traverse: 2° 15' (E. u. B.); 4° (Eisenbahnlafette) up to 180° (Bettungsscheissgerüst)
- Muzzle velocity: 690 to 810 m/s (2,300 to 2,700 ft/s)
- Maximum firing range: 20,100–26,600 metres (22,000–29,100 yd)

The 24 cm SK L/40 "Theodor Karl" (SK - Schnelladekanone (quick loading cannon) L - Länge (with a 40 caliber barrel)) was a German railroad gun that served on both the Eastern Front and the Western Front in World War I. Originally a naval gun, it was adapted for land service after its ships were disarmed beginning in 1915. One gun saw service in the Belgian Army after the war. After Belgium's surrender in World War II, the Germans used that gun on coast-defense duties for the rest of the war.

== Design ==
Beginning in February 1915, the five ships of the pre-dreadnought Kaiser Friedrich III class were decommissioned by the German Navy (Kaiserliche Marine) as obsolete, followed by the five ships of the Wittelsbach class in 1916. Twenty-six of their 24 cm SK L/40 C/94 main guns were transferred to the Army. Eight to be used for coast defense by Batterie S2 at Sylt and Batterie Hamburg at Norderney, and the remaining eighteen were intended for the Western Front. One obvious change made for land service was the placement of a large counterweight above the trunnions to counteract the weight of the cradle below the trunnions. This facilitated elevating the gun using hand wheels.

The guns for the Western Front were mounted in Bettungsschiessgerüst (firing platforms), which were portable mounts that could be emplaced anywhere after several weeks of labor to prepare the position. The Bettungsschiessgerüst rotated on a pivot at the front of the mount; the rear was supported by rollers resting on a semicircular rail. It was generally equipped with a gun shield.

The Germans were dissatisfied with the lengthy time required to emplace the Bettungsschiessgerüst and, on 1 July 1916, decided to emulate the French and place the guns on railroad mounts (Eisenbahnlafette) to maximize their mobility and minimize the time required to emplace the gun. Four guns were removed from their mounts and tested at the Krupp Proving Grounds in Meppen beginning in December 1916. Despite being able to fire in less than ten minutes, they were deemed unsatisfactory. A combination of the best of both methods was developed as the Eisenbahn und Bettungsschiessgerüst (E. u. B.) (railroad and firing platform) mount. The twenty-two remaining guns were placed on the new mounts. The E. u. B. could traverse a total of 2° 15' for fine aiming adjustments.

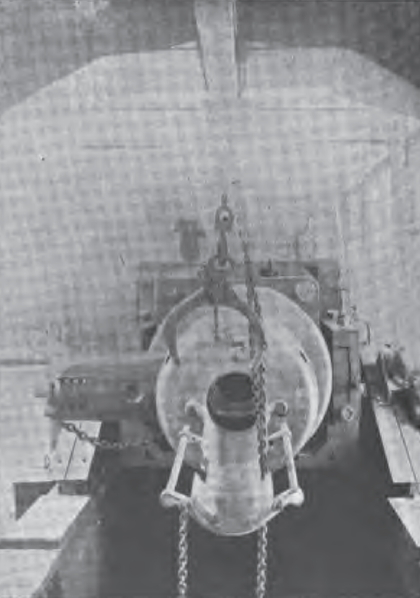
The breech and loading system of a "Theodor Otto", identical to that of the "Theodor Karl"

It could fire from any suitable section of track after curved wedges were bolted to the track behind each wheel to absorb any residual recoil after the gun cradle recoiled backwards. It also had a pintle built into the underside of the front of the mount. Two large rollers were fitted to the underside of the mount at the rear. Seven cars could carry a portable metal firing platform (Bettungslafette) that had a central pivot mount and an outer rail. It was assembled with the aid of a derrick or crane, which took between three and five days, and railroad tracks were laid slightly past the firing platform to accommodate the front bogies of the gun. The gun was moved over the firing platform and then lowered into position after the central section of rail was removed. After the gun's pintle was bolted to the firing platform's pivot mount, the entire carriage was jacked up so that the trucks and their sections of rail could be removed. The carriage was then lowered so that the rear rollers rested on the outer track. Concrete versions were also used. It could have up to 360° of traverse.

=== Ammunition ===
Ammunition on the Eisenbahnlafette and E. u. B. mounts was moved by means of an overhead rail from which a pair of shell tongs lifted up individual shells to be placed in the loading tray fixed to the breech. An extensible rail could raised and braced in place to allow the tongs to reach shells placed on the ground on in an ammunition car behind the mount. The gun had to be loaded at zero elevation and thus needed to be re-aimed between each shot. The "Theodor Karl" used two different shells, one armor-piercing and the other high-explosive, that both weighed 151 kg (333 lb). It used the German naval system of ammunition, where the base charge was held in a metallic cartridge case and supplemented by another charge in a silk bag that was rammed first.

== Combat history ==
The "Theodor Karl" was first blooded at the Battle of the Somme in October 1916, where it performed well enough that another eight guns were transferred to the Army. One gun, assigned to Battery 1011, participated in the Battle of Riga in September 1917. One complete C/96/97 turret from the armored cruiser Fürst Bismarck was emplaced in the Forêt d'Houthulst in 1917, where it formed Battery 1025 - it was called "Turm Theodor Karl". The two guns were removed from the turret at the end of 1917 and placed on E. u. B. mounts.

Three E. u. B. guns were captured in Belgium in 1918. Twenty Theodor Karls mounted on railroad cars (either Eisenbahnlafette or E. u. B. mounts) were destroyed after the Armistice. It is uncertain if the four railroad mounts were among those destroyed by the Allies. Four escaped destruction by the Military Inter-Allied Commission of Control because they were assigned to Batterie Altona on coast-defense duties at Wilhelmshaven.

One gun survived in Belgian service after the war and was captured in World War II by the Germans and placed into service with Railroad Artillery Battery (Artillerie-Batterie (Eisenbahn)) 674. It spent the war on coast-defense duties in the vicinity of Hendaye and Saint-Jean-de-Luz near the Spanish border with France, but its fate is unknown.

== See also ==
- BL 9.2 inch Railway Gun: approximate British equivalent

== Sources ==
- Reichs-Marine-Amt, ed. (1908). Bedienungsvorschrift für die 24 cm Schnellade-Kanone L/40 in Drehscheibenlafette C/97. Berlin: E. S. Mittler. OCLC 252062325.
- François, Guy. Eisenbahnartillerie: Histoire de l'artillerie lourd sur voie ferrée allemande des origines à 1945. Paris: Editions Histoire et Fortifications, 2006
- Hogg, Ian V. German Artillery of World War Two. 2nd corrected edition. Mechanicsville, PA: Stackpole Books, 1997 ISBN 1-85367-480-X
- Jäger, Herbert. German Artillery of World War One. Ramsbury, Marlborough, Wiltshire: Crowood Press, 2001 ISBN 1-86126-403-8
- Kosar, Franz. Eisenbahngeschütz der Welt. Stuttgart: Motorbook, 1999 ISBN 3-613-01976-0
- Miller, H. W., Lt. Col. Railway Artillery: A Report on the Characteristics, Scope of Utility, Etc., of Railway Artillery, Volume I Washington: Government Print Office, 1921
- Schmalenbach, Paul (1983). "German Navy Large Bore Guns Operational Ashore During World War I". Warship International. XX (2): 123–153. ISSN 0043-0374.
