= List of railway artillery =

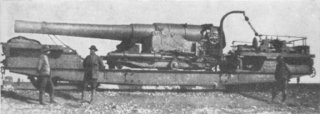
BL 9.2 inch (233 mm) Railway Gun c 1900

Railway guns were large guns and howitzers mounted on and fired from specially constructed railway cars. They have been obsolete since World War II and have been superseded by tactical surface-to-surface missiles, multiple rocket launchers, and bomber aircraft.

Caliber (mm)	Weapon name	Country of origin	Period
120	Canon de 120 L mle 1878 sur affût-truc Peigné-Canet-Schneider mle 1897	France	World War I
138.6	Canon de 140 sur affût-truc mle 1884	France	World War I
149.1	15 cm SK "Nathan"	German Empire	World War I
149.3	15 cm K (E)	Nazi Germany	World War II
155	Materiel de 155 sur affût-truc Schneider	France	World War I
155	Obusier de 155 C mle 1881 sur affût-truc Peigné-Canet-Schneider mle 1897	France	World War I
164	Canon de 164 modèle 1893/96 TAZ	France	World War I
172.6	17 cm SK L/40 i.R.L. auf Eisenbahnwagen "Samuel"	German Empire	World War I
173	17 cm K (E)	Nazi Germany	World War II
180	TM-1-180	Soviet Union	World War II
194	19 cm Canon G modèle 1916/1917	France	World War I
194	Canon de 19 modèle 1870/93 TAZ	France	World War I, World War II
200	Obusier de 200 "Pérou" sur affût-truck TAZ Schneider	France	World War I
203	20.3 cm K (E)	Nazi Germany	World War II
203	8-inch M1888 gun	United States	World War I, World War II
203	8-inch Mk. VI railway gun (aka M3A2)	United States	World War II
209.3	21 cm SK "Peter Adalbert"	German Empire	World War I
210	21 cm K12 (E)	Nazi Germany	World War II
233	BL 9.2 inch Railway Gun	United Kingdom	World War I, World War II
238	24 cm SK L/30 "Theodor Otto"	German Empire	World War I
238	24 cm SK L/40 "Theodor Karl"	German Empire	World War I
238	24 cm Theodor Kanone (E)	Nazi Germany	World War II
238	24 cm Theodor Bruno Kanone (E)	Nazi Germany	World War II
240	24 cm Canon G modèle 1916	France	World War I
240	Canon de 240 L Mle 1884	France	World War I
240	Canon de 240 TR Mle 1903	France	World War I - World War II
240	Canon de 240 modèle 93/96 TAZ	France	World War I - World War II
240	Type 90 240 mm railway gun	Japan	World War II
274	Mortier de 274 Mle 1870/81	France	World War I
274	Canon de 274 modèle 93/96 Berceau	France	World War I
274	Canon de 274 modèle 87/93 Glissement	France	World War I, World War II
283	28 cm SK L/40 "Bruno"	German Empire	World War I
283	28 cm K L/40 "Kurfürst"	German Empire	World War I
283	28 cm schwere Bruno Kanone (E)	Nazi Germany	World War II
283	28 cm K5 railway gun	Nazi Germany	World War II
293	Mortier de 293 Danois sur affut-truck modèle 1914	France	World War I - World War II
305	Canon de 305 modèle 93/96 TAZ	France	World War I
305	Canon de 305 modèle 1893/96 à berceau	France	World War I
305	Canon de 305 modèle 1893/96 à glissement	France	World War I
305	Canon de 305 modèle 1906/10 à glissement	France	World War II
305	BL 12 inch Mk IX Railway Gun	United Kingdom	World War I
305	BL 12 inch Railway Howitzer Mk I, III, V	United Kingdom	World War I, World War II
305	TM-3-12	Soviet Union	World War II - 1991
305	12-inch coast defense mortar	United States	World War I - World War II
305	12-inch Bethlehem Model 1918 railway gun	United States	World War I
320	Canon de 32 modèle 1870/81 à glissement	France	World War I
320	Canon de 32 modèle 1870/84 à glissement	France	World War I - World War II
320	Canon de 32 modèle 1870/93 à glissement	France	World War I - World War II
320	Canon de 320 modèle 1917 à glissement	France	World War II
340	Canon de 340 modèle 1893 à glissement	France	World War I - World War II
340	Canon de 340 modèle 1912 à berceau	France	World War I - World War II
340	Canon de 340 modèle 1912 à glissement	France	World War I - World War II
343	BL 13.5 inch Railway Gun	United Kingdom	World War II
356	BL 14 inch Railway Gun	United Kingdom	World War I
356	USN 14 inch/50 Railway Gun	United States	World War I
356	14-inch M1920 railway gun	United States	1920s - World War II
356	TM-1-14	Soviet Union	1930s - World War II
370	Mortier de 370 mm Modèle 1887	France	World War I - World War II
370	Obusier de 370 modèle 1915	France	World War I - World War II
370	Canon de 370 modèle 75/79 Glissement	France	World War I - World War II
370	Mortier de 370 modèle 1914 Filloux	France	World War I - World War II
380	38 cm SK L/45 "Max"	German Empire	World War I
380	38 cm Siegfried K (E)	Nazi Germany	World War II
381	Cannone da 381/40 AVS	Italy	World War I
400	Obusier de 400 Modèle 1915/1916	France	World War I - World War II
457	BL 18 inch railway howitzer	United Kingdom	World War II
520	Obusier de 520 modèle 1916	France	World War I - World War II
800	80 cm Dora	Nazi Germany	World War II
800	80 cm Schwerer Gustav	Nazi Germany	World War II

== Notes and references ==
Hogg, Ian V. (1998). Allied Artillery of World War I. Ramsbury, Wiltshire, UK: The Crowood Press, Ltd. pp. 113–148. ISBN 1-86126-104-7.
