= BL 12-inch railway gun =

Ordnance BL 12 inch Gun Mk IX on truck, railway
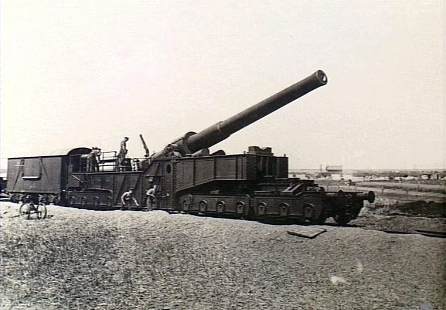
- 12 inch Mk IX W railway gun on Armstrong Mk II mounting, Méaulte, France 1916
- Type: Railway gun
- Place of origin: United Kingdom

Service history
- In service: 1915 – 1930 (Rail)
- Used by: United Kingdom
- Wars: First World War

Production history
- Manufacturer: Woolwich Arsenal (guns); Vickers & Elswick Ordnance Company (carriage)
- Produced: 1906 (guns)
- No. built: 4 (Rail)
- Variants: mountings Mk I, Mk II

Specifications
- Length: 40 ft (12.192 m) L/40
- Shell: HE; 850 lb (385.55 kg)
- Calibre: 12-inch (304.8 mm)
- Breech: Welin screw
- Recoil: Hydro – spring, 34 inches (863.6 mm)
- Carriage: Railway truck
- Elevation: 0° - 30°
- Traverse: 1° L & R
- Muzzle velocity: 2,610 ft/s (796 m/s)
- Maximum firing range: 32,700 yards (29,900 m)
- Filling: Amatol
- Filling weight: 94 lb (42.64 kg)

The British Ordnance BL 12 inch gun Mk IX on truck, railway mounted surplus 12 inch Mk IX W naval guns, manufactured by Woolwich Arsenal in 1906, (Note: Two of the guns may have been manufactured during World War I, as at least one source states that 6 more Mk IX W guns were made during World War I.) on various railway platforms to provide mobile long-range heavy artillery for the British Army on the Western Front in World War I.

== History ==
Vickers mounted two Mk IX W guns on slightly different railway mountings, Mk I, from September 1915. They are both identified by the open-frame appearance, recoil buffers above the barrel and the bogies with frames between the wheels similar to locomotive bogies. One mounting has a distinctive diamond-shape from the side and has a warping winch on the front; the other's carriage has a more squared-off profile with no warping winch at the front. The weapons on the Mk I mountings were originally reserve guns for HMS Cornwallis.

Elswick Ordnance Company (Armstrongs) mounted two more on its own design of Mk II railway mounting, delivered to the Western Front in August 1916. They are identified by the boxed-in frame appearance, recoil buffers below the barrel and the bogies with frames outside the wheels.

== Design ==
The gun cars allowed only 1° left and right traverse, achieved by pivoting the entire gun car body about the forward bogies, in the two Vickers carriages, or about the rear bogies in the Armstrong carriages. Like most railway guns in the war it was operated on specially-constructed curved sections of track and moved forward or backward to point it at a new target. Fine adjustment could then be achieved by onboard traversing, which at the gun's maximum range covered an arc of about 1,000 yards (910 m).

The initial shock of firing was absorbed by a hydro-spring mechanism, allowing 34 inches (86 cm) of recoil within the gun mounting. The remaining recoil energy was absorbed by allowing the entire railway wagon to roll backwards 40 feet (12 m) (Vickers carriage) or 3–4 yards (2.7–3.7 m) (Armstrong carriage) against locked brakes. This "rolling recoil" system allowed the gun to be operated without the need to construct a pit with a strong static platform below the gun for it to recoil into and to allow transmission of all the recoil force directly to the ground as was typical of many large US and French railway guns.

== Combat service ==
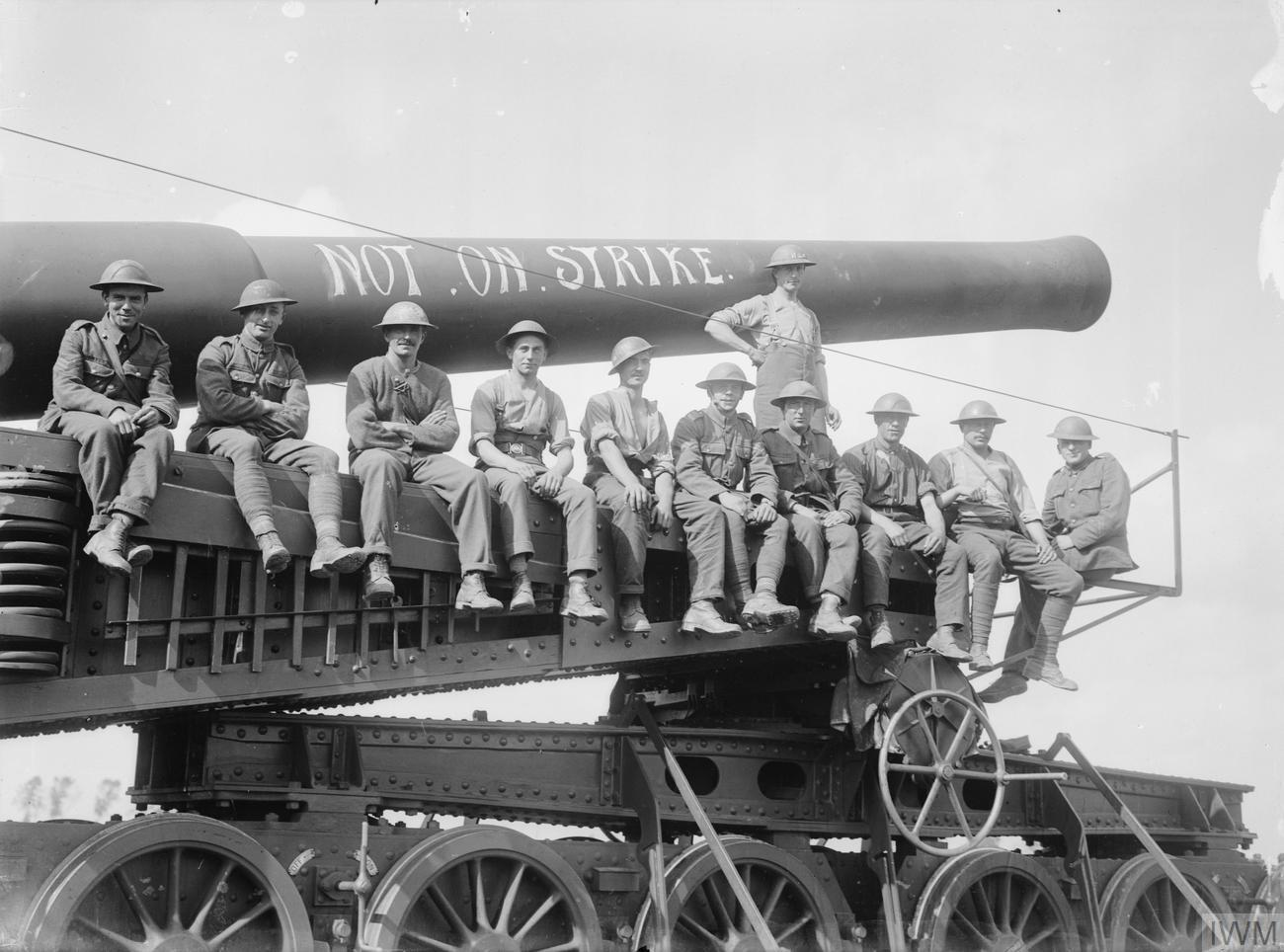
Crew of 12-inch (304.8 mm) railway gun on Vickers Mk I mounting, Woesten, 23 August 1917, Third Battle of Ypres

At the end of World War I, the dispositions of the guns on the Western Front were: 1 gun of 92 Battery and 1 gun of 543 Battery with First Army i.e. Artois; 1 gun of 92 Battery with Third Army i.e. Somme; 1 gun of 543 Battery with Fourth Army i.e. Somme.

== See also ==
- List of railway artillery
- BL 12 inch Mk IX naval gun

=== Weapons of comparable role, performance and era ===
- Canon de 305 mm Modèle 1893/96 gun French equivalent railway gun
