= BL 14-inch railway gun =

Ordnance BL 14-inch gun Mk III on truck, railway
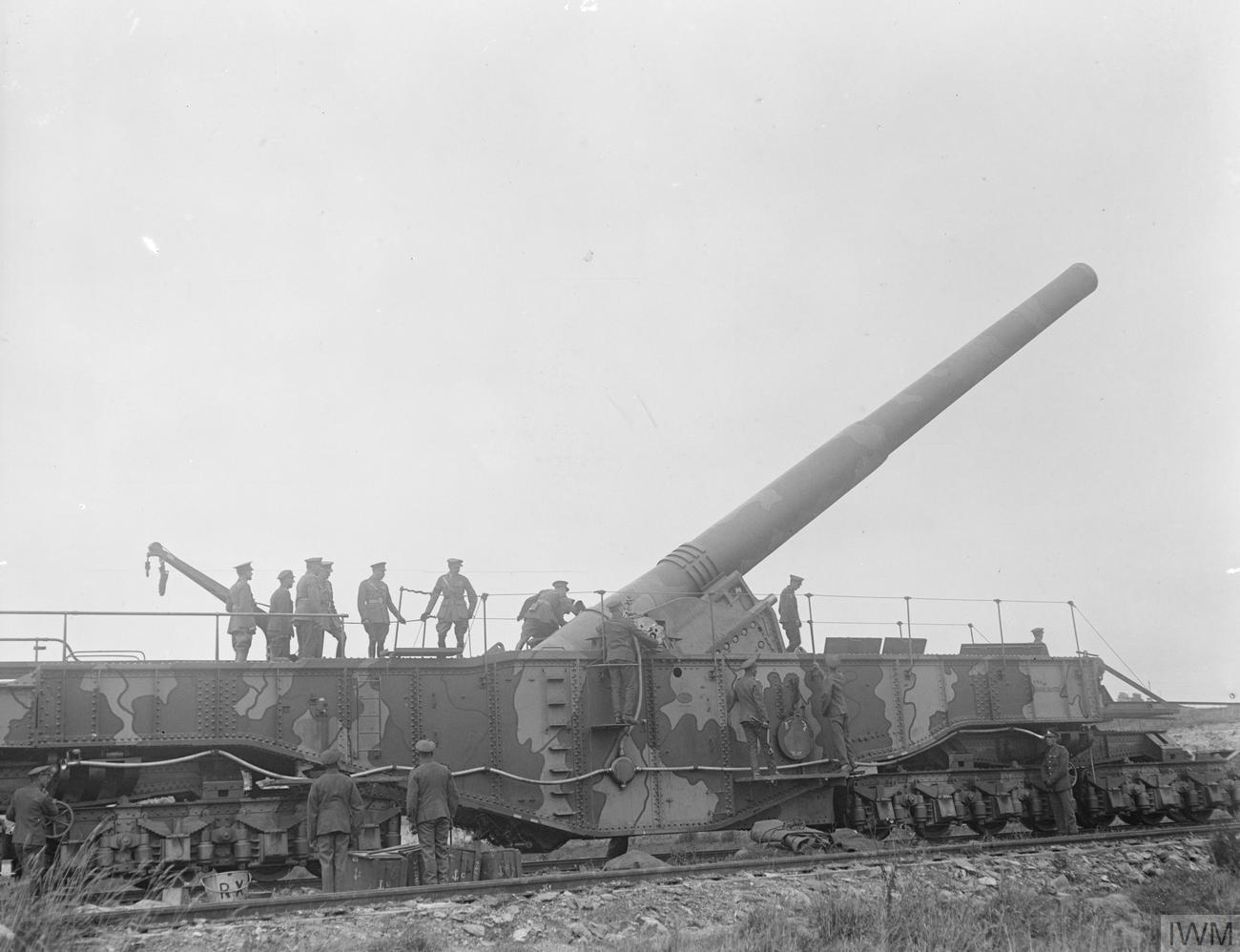
- King George V inspects Boche Buster, Marœuil 8 August 1918
- Type: Railway gun
- Place of origin: United Kingdom

Service history
- In service: 1918–1926
- Used by: United Kingdom
- Wars: World War I

Production history
- Designer: Elswick Ordnance Company
- Manufacturer: Elswick Ordnance Company
- No. built: 2

Specifications
- Mass: 83 1/4 ton (barrel & Breech); 248 ton total.
- Barrel length: Bore 630 inches (16.002 m) (45 cal)
- Crew: 30
- Shell: HE 1,586 pounds (719 kg) 4 c.r.h. (later 1,400 pounds (640 kg) 8 c.r.h.)
- Calibre: 14-inch (355.6 mm)
- Recoil: hydro – pneumatic, 34 inches (864 mm)
- Carriage: railway truck, 15 axles
- Elevation: 0° - 40°
- Traverse: 2° L & R
- Muzzle velocity: 2,450 feet per second (747 m/s) (1,586 pounds (719 kg) shell); 2,600 feet per second (792 m/s) (1,400 pounds (640 kg) shell)
- Maximum firing range: 34,600 yards (31,640 m) (1,586 pounds (719 kg) shell); 38,000 yards (34,750 m) (1,400 pounds (640 kg) shell)

Ordnance BL 14-inch gun on truck, railway were 2 British 14-inch Mk III (Note: Mk III = Mark 3. Britain used Roman numerals to denote Marks (i.e. models) of ordnance. Hence these were the third model of 14-inch gun in British service.) naval guns mounted on railway carriages, used on the Western Front in 1918. The guns had a very brief service life and were scrapped in 1926, but their railway carriages were re-used for mounting guns in World War II.

== Design and development ==
The guns were built by Armstrongs (Elswick Ordnance Company) and were originally intended to be mounted as a pair in a twin turret on the Japanese battleship Yamashiro but the order was not completed. Hence the breech of the left gun, which became known as "Scene Shifter", opened to the left which was unusual for a British army gun, while that of the right gun, "Boche Buster", opened to the right. Work on mounting them on railway carriages began in 1916 but was not completed until 1918.

The gun was fired from curved sections of track off the main line which allowed it to be pointed in the required direction, and the gun mount could traverse 2° left and right for finer adjustments. To adjust more than 2° the entire gun car was moved forward or backward along its track.

The railway mounting was of the "cradle and rolling recoil" type : the gun was mounted high up in a standard cradle with hydropneumatic buffers which allowed the gun to recoil 34-inches on firing at maximum elevation without striking the ground, and the remaining recoil force was expended by allowing the entire railway car to roll backwards 20–30 feet until stopped by its brakes. The gun car had a winch at the front attached by cable to a strongpoint further ahead, and the winch dragged the gun car back to its firing position. The advantage of this system was that no special track preparation was required and the gun could fire from any position along its curved section of track.

== Combat service ==
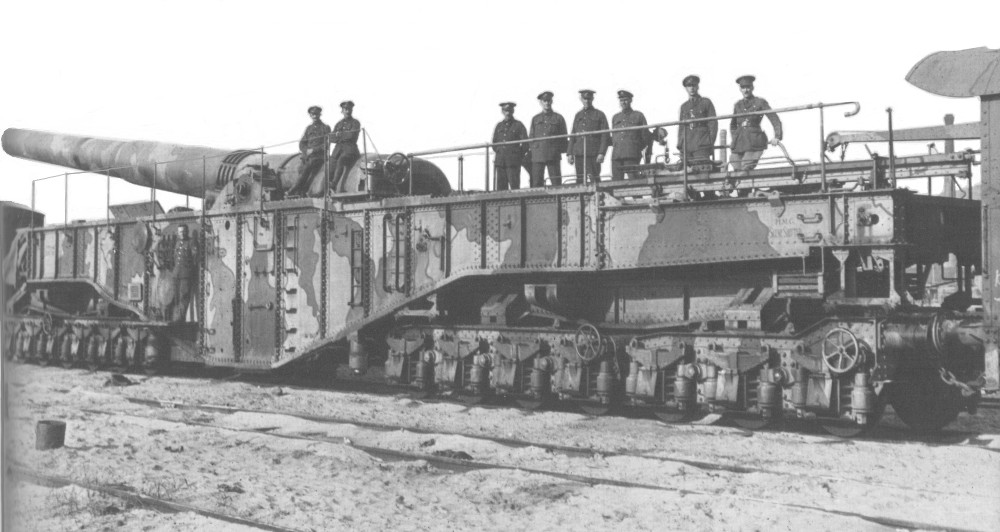
Scene Shifter at Camiers, France, 1918

The guns arrived with their carriages in France on 26 May 1918, but incomplete, and were not in action until 8 August. The two guns were operated by 471 Siege Battery from May 1918, and were known as "HM Gun Boche Buster", operating near Arras with First Army, and "HM Gun Scene Shifter", operating near Bethune with Fifth Army. They were used for long-range interdiction fire on key German targets such as railway junctions. King George V personally oversaw the firing of the first shell by Boche Buster from near Marœuil, 6 km NW of Arras, on 8 August in a fireplan to hit German reinforcements being sent south to oppose the British Amiens offensive. This shell heavily damaged a railway junction at Douai and became known as "The King's Shot". A total of approximately 235 rounds were fired by the guns during their four months on the Western Front.

14-inch was not a standard British service calibre and hence it was impractical to keep the guns in service after World War I ended. The barrels were declared obsolete in 1926 and scrapped, but several of the rail gun carriages went into storage, without their barrels but still bearing their names. In 1939 the rail gun carriages were removed from storage and recommissioned. Scene Shifter, Gladiator and Piecemaker were fitted with 13.5-inch guns from the Navy reserve stock and Boche-Buster was fitted with an 18-inch (460 mm) howitzer barrel No L2 - made in 1919 and stored with its mountings ever since. The three 13.5 inch rail guns went to Dover for channel duties, and the 18 inch rail howitzer joined the 9.2 inch rail guns and 12 inch rail howitzers on inshore railways as part of the super heavy brigades' home defence intended to bombard landing grounds should a German seaborne invasion take place.

== See also ==
- List of railway artillery
- EOC 14-inch 45-calibre naval gun this gun in naval service

=== Weapons of comparable role, performance and era ===
- 14"/50 caliber railway gun US equivalent

== Bibliography ==
- Dale Clarke, British Artillery 1914–1919. Heavy Artillery. Osprey Publishing, Oxford UK, 2005.
- Jeff Dorman, "The King's Shot" in Battle, December 1975
- General Sir Martin Farndale, "History of the Royal Regiment of Artillery. Western Front 1914-18". London: Royal Artillery Institution, 1986.
- I.V. Hogg & L.F. Thurston, British Artillery Weapons & Ammunition 1914–1918. London: Ian Allan, 1972.
- Harry W Miller, United States Army Ordnance Department, Railway Artillery: A Report on the Characteristics, Scope of Utility, Etc., of Railway Artillery, Volume I. Washington, Government Printing Office, 1921.
- Harry W Miller, United States Army Ordnance Department, Railway Artillery: A Report on the Characteristics, Scope of Utility, Etc., of Railway Artillery, Volume II, pages 155-161. Washington : Government Printing Office, 1921.
