= Canon de 340 modèle 1893 à glissement =

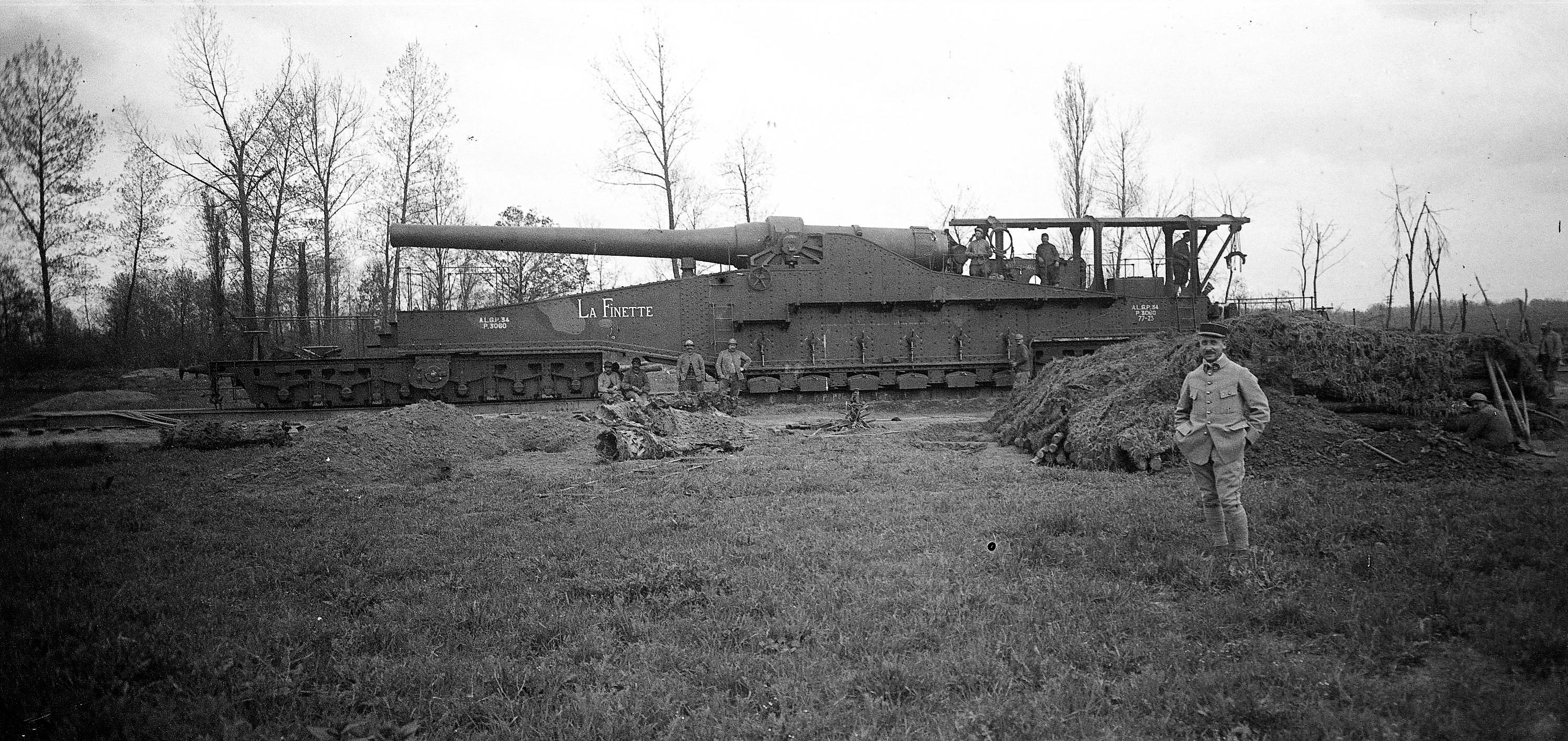
- A mle 1893 named "la Finette" at Condé-sur-Aisne, France in 1918.
- Type: Railway gun
- Place of origin: France

Service history
- In service: 1917–1945
- Used by: France
- Wars: World War I World War II

Production history
- Designer: Schneider
- Designed: 1916
- Manufacturer: Schneider
- Produced: 1916
- No. built: 2

Specifications
- Mass: 187 t (184 long tons; 206 short tons)
- Barrel length: 11.9 m (39 ft) L/35
- Shell: Separate loading bagged charges and projectiles
- Shell weight: 342 kg (754 lb)
- Caliber: 34 cm (13.4 in)
- Breech: Interrupted screw breech
- Recoil: Carriage recoil
- Carriage: Two six-axle rail bogies
- Elevation: -3 to +40°
- Traverse: None
- Rate of fire: 1 round every four minutes
- Muzzle velocity: 720 m/s (2,400 ft/s)
- Maximum firing range: 27 km (17 mi)

The Canon de 340 modèle 1893 à glissement was a French railway gun designed in 1916 that saw action during the First world war and Second world war.

== History ==
Although the majority of combatants had heavy field artillery prior to the outbreak of the First World War, none had adequate numbers of heavy guns in service, nor had they foreseen the growing importance of heavy artillery once the Western Front stagnated and trench warfare set in. Since aircraft of the period were not yet capable of carrying large diameter bombs the burden of delivering heavy firepower fell on the artillery. Two sources of heavy artillery suitable for conversion to field use were surplus coastal defense guns and naval guns.

However, a paradox faced artillery designers of the time; while large caliber naval guns were common, large caliber land weapons were not due to their weight, complexity, and lack of mobility. Large caliber field guns often required extensive site preparation because the guns had to be broken down into multiple loads light enough to be towed by a horse team or the few traction engines of the time and then reassembled before use. Building a new gun could address the problem of disassembling, transporting and reassembling a large gun, but it did not necessarily address how to convert existing heavy weapons to make them more mobile. Rail transport proved to be the most practical solution because the problems of heavy weight, lack of mobility and reduced setup time were addressed.

== Design ==
The Canon de 340 modèle 1893 à glissement started life as two Canon de 340/35 modèle 1893 naval guns as used on the Terrible class of coastal defense ships. The guns converted were made available when the Terrible class were deactivated and scrapped. The guns were typical built-up guns of the period with steel construction consisting of a rifled steel liner with several layers of reinforcing hoops and an interrupted screw breech. To load the gun barrel was lowered and a shell was brought forward by an elevated hoist on the rear of the carriage.

The guns consisted of a large rectangular steel base, which was suspended on two six-axle articulated rail bogies manufactured by Schneider. The number of axles was determined by the weight limit for European railways of 17 tonnes per axle. The carriage was similar to that used by the contemporary Canon de 370 modèle 75/79 Glissement produced by Schneider. Since the carriage did not have a traversing mechanism it was aimed by drawing the guns across a section of curved track. Once in firing position, a section of rail bed was reinforced with wood and iron beams to support the weight of the gun. Six steel beams under the center of the carriage were then lowered to lay across the tracks and the carriage was jacked up to take the weight off the bogies and anchor the gun in place. There may have been another two beams located between the triple bogies on each end of the carriage. When the gun fired the entire carriage recoiled a few feet and was stopped by the friction of the beams on the tracks. The carriage was then lowered onto its axles and was either pushed back into place with a shunting locomotive or a windlass mounted on the front of the carriage pulled the carriage back into position. This cheap, simple and effective system came to characterize Schneider's railway guns during the later war years and is known as the Glissement system.

== World War I ==
From the picture in the infobox at least one of the guns assigned to ALGP.34 (artillerie lourde à grande puissance) saw action during the German spring offensive of 1918 at the Third Battle of the Aisne near Condé-sur-Aisne.

== World War II ==
At the outbreak of the Second World War, the two guns were mobilized and assigned to the 6th battery of Heavy Artillery Regiment 372° of the ALVF (Artillerie Lourde sur Voie Ferrée). The two guns of the 6th battery were stationed at an assembly point at Pagny-sur-Moselle when the Battle of France began. The French were only able to evacuate one of the guns to Besançon due to the railroad tracks in the region being destroyed by German bombers. This gun eventually managed to make it to Bayonne via Lyon and Toulouse.
