= 14-inch/50-caliber railway gun =

14"/50 caliber railway gun
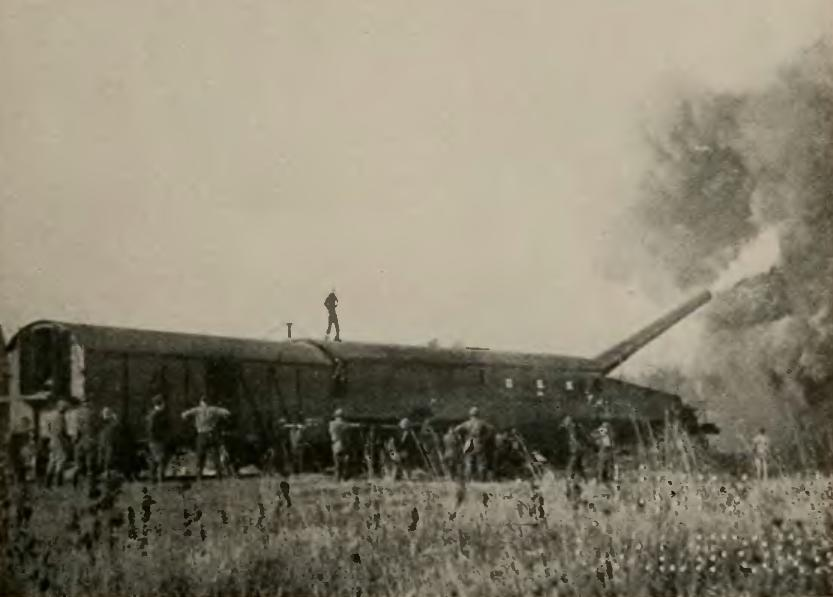
- Firing from Thierville-sur-Meuse, NW of Verdun
- Type: Railway gun
- Place of origin: United States

Service history
- In service: 1918–1920s
- Used by: United States
- Wars: World War I

Production history
- Designed: 1917
- Manufacturer: Baldwin Locomotive Works (train)
- Produced: 1918
- No. built: Mk I: 11; Mk II: 2
- Variants: Mk I, Mk II

Specifications
- Barrel length: 700 inches (17.780 m) (50 calibers)
- Shell: 1,400 pounds (640 kg)
- Caliber: 14-inch (355.6 mm)
- Recoil: hydro-spring, 44 inches (1,120 mm)
- Carriage: railway truck, 12 or 20 axles
- Elevation: 0–43°
- Traverse: 2.5° L & R
- Muzzle velocity: 2,800 feet per second (853 m/s)
- Maximum firing range: 42,000 yards (38,000 m) @ 43°

The 14"/50 caliber railway guns were spare US Navy Mk 4 14 inch/50 caliber guns mounted on railway cars and operated by US Navy crews in France in the closing months of World War I.

== Background ==
In 1917 the Allies were losing an artillery duel against heavy German guns along the Flanders coast in Belgium, and the important French Channel port of Dunkirk was being shelled by 38 cm German guns sited in Belgium at a range of over 24 miles (39 km). There was also a need for the Allies to bombard strategic targets in the German rear areas to hinder German capability to stage attacks. The largest Allied guns in the area were British 12-inch Mk X guns which were outranged.

== Mark I Navy railway mount ==
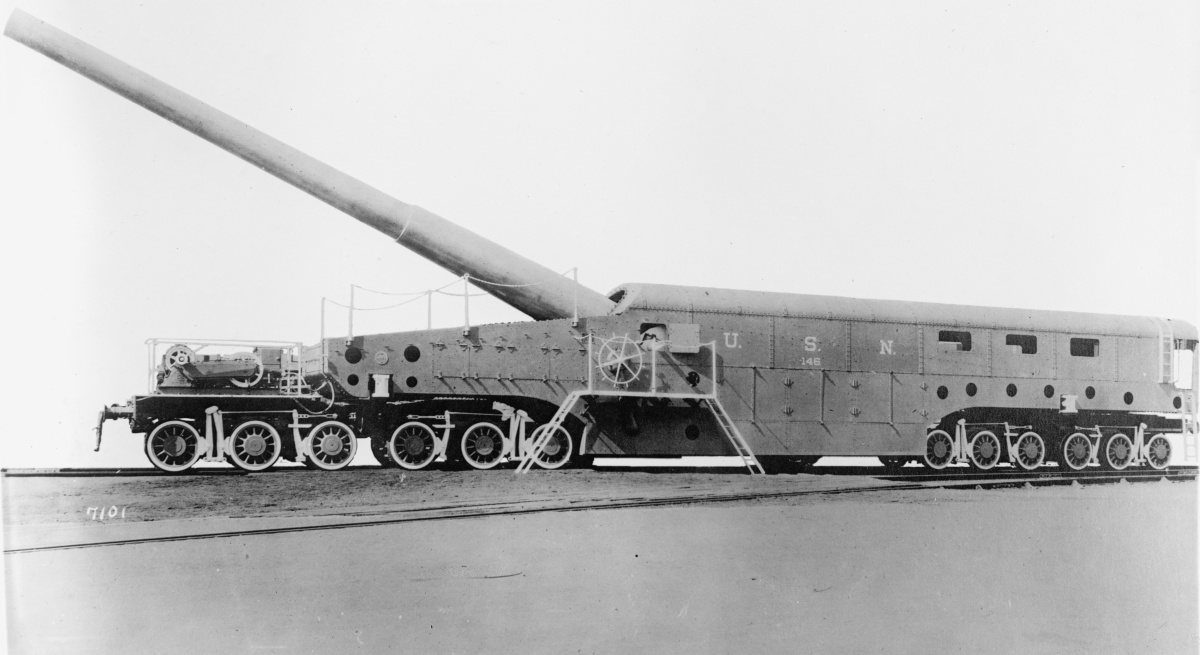
Mk I gun car of the type that served in France

Upon its entry into the war, the US chose its largest and longest-ranged available naval gun to fill the gap—the 14"/50 caliber Mk 4 gun with a muzzle velocity of 2800 feet per second. The new 16-inch gun would have been preferable, but it was not yet available in numbers; spare 14-inch guns kept for the active fleet were used instead.

Baldwin Locomotive Works delivered five trains for the United States Navy during April and May 1918. Each train transported and supported a 14"/50 caliber Mk 4 gun mounted on a rail carriage with four 6-wheel bogies.

=== Arrival in France ===
There was some doubt as to whether the Flanders coast and French Channel ports were now safe Allied ports, following the German spring offensive successes in March and April 1918 which brought those areas within German artillery and attack range. The guns were therefore diverted from the British zone in the north to further south, to the port of St. Nazaire, to avoid the risk of having such valuable assets captured or destroyed.

Each battery composed of a locomotive, gun car, ammunition cars, supporting equipment cars, and accommodation cars for the crew. Each train was under the command of a United States Navy lieutenant, and under overall command of Rear Admiral Charles Peshall Plunkett. After delivery by ship, these trains were assembled in St. Nazaire in August.

=== Operation ===
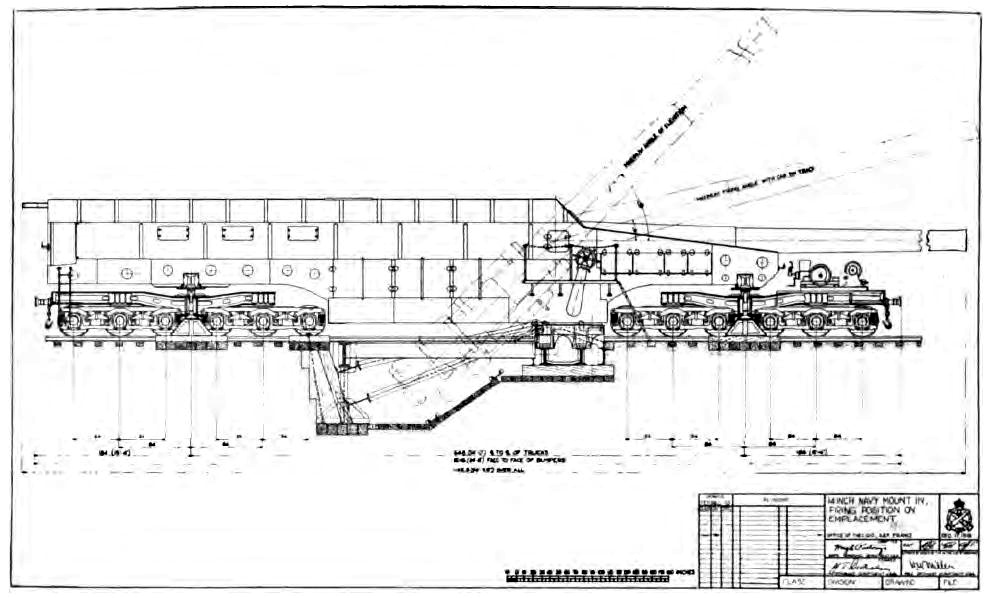
Mk I gun car with pit prepared, ready for firing

Before a gun arrived at a firing position, a curved length of track was laid at a position calculated suitable for firing at a specific target, and a pit 9 feet (2.7 m) deep, involving the removal of 103 cubic yards (79 m^{3}) of earth was dug, between the rails into which the gun recoiled 44 inches (1.1 m). Supports were also embedded in this pit connected to the gun mounting, to transmit remaining recoil energy directly to the ground and avoid placing excessive vertical strain on the gun car (and, through it, the track) and prevent it from moving backwards. In fact, by late 1918 the French had already constructed many such curved spurs (épis) for their own guns and hence the US guns were often able to re-use these.

The gun car was positioned over the pit, the wheels were locked and the platform was locked into position with gun mount and car's weight shifted from the trucks (bogies) directly to the ground by jacks and lifting screws. The rails were removed from above the pit because the gun breech was too wide to pass between them. The gun could elevate up to 43°, which gave it a maximum range of 42,000 yards (23.8 miles/38.4 km), and could be traversed 2.5° left and right of center. Any greater change of direction required the gun to be moved forward or backward along its curved track and a new recoil pit dug. The gun used the standard naval gun mounting and recoil system, with the addition of a pneumatic system to assist the runout springs to return the gun to firing position after recoil at the higher maximum elevation of 43° compared to maximum 30° in naval use.

A major disadvantage of the Mark I mount was that the weight was distributed forward, placing weight on the leading axles that was above the normally allowable weight for French railways, and also caused axle bearings to overheat at any speed over 5–10 mph. The armored enclosed gun house lacked ventilation and caused condensation to form, which promoted rusting. The necessity to excavate a recoil pit was also not acceptable as a long-term solution of recoil control. Hence the Mark I, while functioning as designed, was seen as only a compromise measure necessitated by wartime time constraints.

=== Combat service ===
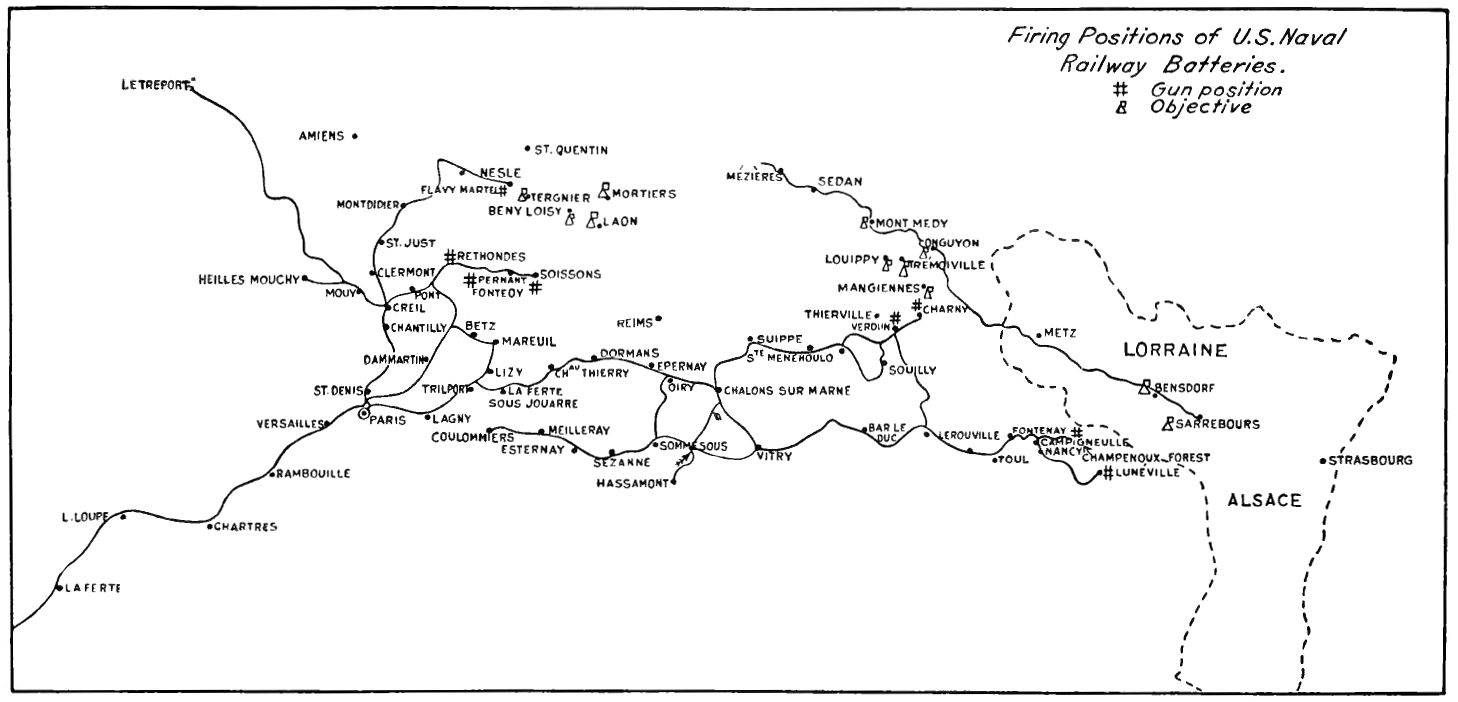
Map showing firing locations and targets in France, 1918

The guns served to support General Pershing's army offensive in the Meuse-Argonne sector of the Western Front in France. They operated as single-gun batteries designated Battery 1 to Battery 5. Battery 2, commanded by Lieutenant (JG) E. D. Duckett, US Navy, was the first all-US gun (crew, gun, and ammunition) to fire in action on the Western Front. On 6 September 1918 they fired from the forest of Compiegne at the important German railway center of Tergnier in support of an Allied attack.

The guns were used to target key infrastructure deep behind the German lines, such as railway junctions and other lines of communication and concentration, typically only opening fire after an Allied attack had begun to avoid giving the Germans any warning of Allied intentions.

They fired 782 shells on 25 separate active days on the Western Front at ranges between 27 and 36 kilometers. This equated to an average of 156 rounds per gun, which was approximately half the 300 rounds expected life of these guns before they would need refurbishment. The guns were only fired for specific strategic purposes to conserve barrel life, with smaller guns being used whenever possible. Hence on many days they remained inactive or were being moved.

The last shot was fired by Battery 4 at 10:57:30 a.m. on 11 November 1918, timed to land just before the scheduled Armistice at 11 a.m.

== Mark I Army railway mount ==
The US Army ordered three units identical to the Navy Mark I mountings in May 1918 and another three in July 1918, also from Baldwin Locomotive Works. They were all completed by 20 September 1918 but the war ended before they were required to be shipped to France.

== Mark II Navy railway mount ==
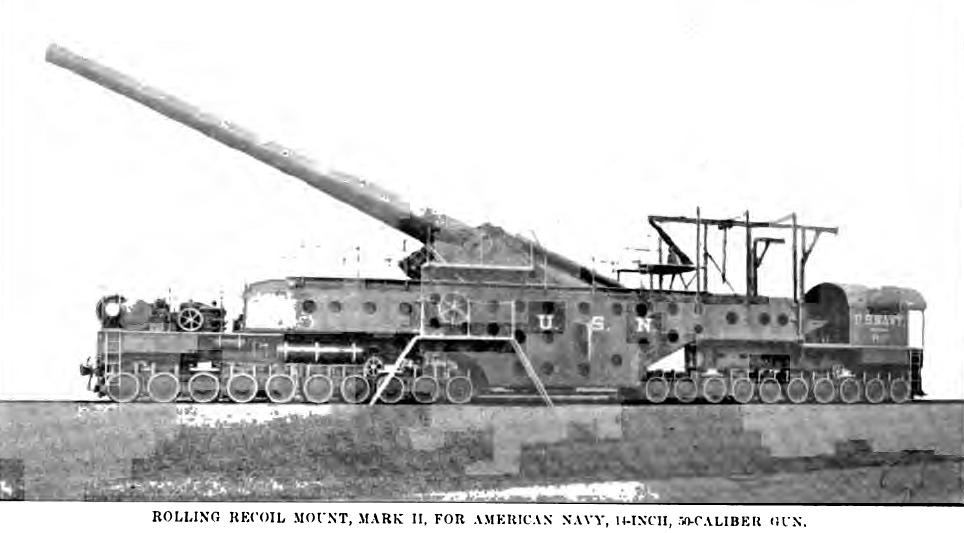
Mk II mount

The new Mark II gun car developed during 1918 carried the same 14"/50 caliber Mk 4 gun but addressed the problem areas: it dispensed with the armored gun house, with gunners working in the open; the weight was more evenly spread over 20 axles instead of 12; the French system of rolling recoil was adopted, in which the gun was mounted higher to allow full recoil at maximum elevation without striking the ground and the car rolled back 30–40 feet after firing to absorb remaining recoil. This made it possible to fire the gun along any part of its curved track without any prior preparation, with elevation up to 40°. After firing, the gun car used a winch mounted at the front, connected to a strong point in the ground in front, to pull itself back to its firing position. World War I ended before the Mark II entered service, and it was used for coastal defense in the US.

== Surviving examples ==
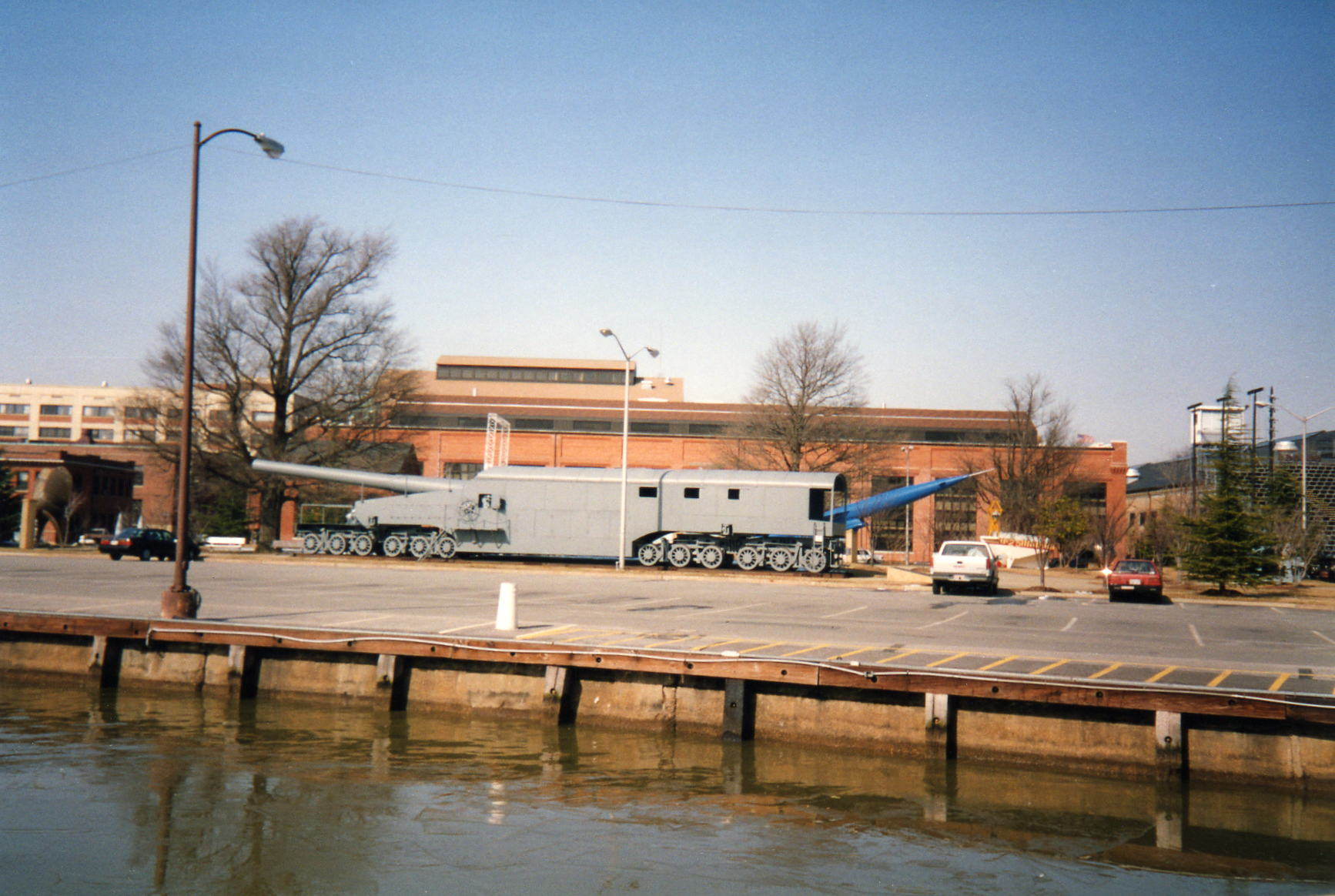
Railway gun at the Washington Navy Yard

- One gun on a US Navy Mark I railway car is preserved at the National Museum of the United States Navy, Washington Navy Yard, Washington, D.C.

== See also ==
- 14"/50 caliber gun: gun description and US Navy service
- 14-inch M1920 railway gun—US successor
- List of railway artillery

=== Weapons of comparable role, performance and era ===
- BL 14 inch Railway Gun: British equivalent

== Bibliography ==
- Breck, Edward (1922). The United States naval railway batteries in France. Department of the Navy, Office of Naval Records and Library. Washington, D.C.: Government Printing Office.
- Ralph Earle, Editor (1920), "Navy Ordnance Activities. World War 1917–1918". Government Printing Office, Washington, D.C.
- Miller, Harry W. (1921). Railway Artillery: A Report on the Characteristics, Scope of Utility, Etc., of Railway Artillery, Volume I. Department of the Army, Ordnance Department. Washington, D.C.: Government Printing Office.
- Willcox, Cornélis De Witt, and Edwin Roy Stuart (1918): The International Military Digest Annual for 1917. Cumulative Digest Corporation, New York. pp. 169–170.
- TM 9-2300 standard artillery and fire control material. dated 1944
