= 14-inch M1920 railway gun =

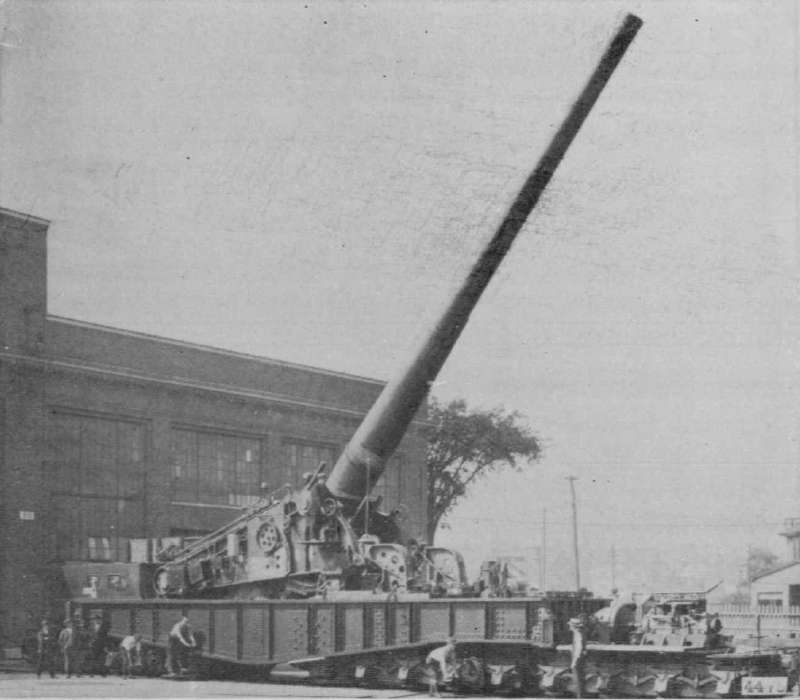
- Diagram showing gun barrel in the elevated position.
- Type: Railway gun
- Place of origin: United States

Service history
- In service: 1925 – 1946
- Used by: United States
- Wars: World War II

Production history
- Designed: 1920
- Manufacturer: Watervliet Arsenal
- Produced: 1925
- No. built: 4

Specifications
- Mass: Tube and recoil band: 230,000 lbs
- Length: 18.1 meters (60 feet)
- Shell: Separate loading, HE, and AP
- Caliber: 14-inch (355.6 mm)
- Breech: Interrupted screw, (step-cut)
- Recoil: Hydro-pneumatic
- Carriage: Railway truck, 14 axles
- Elevation: 50° fixed, 19° on track
- Traverse: 7° on track, 360° fixed
- Rate of fire: 1 rpm
- Muzzle velocity: 2,650 feet per second (808 m/s)
- Effective firing range: 48,220 yards (44,090 m)
- Feed system: Hand

The 14-inch M1920 railway gun was the last model railway gun to be deployed by the United States Army. It was an upgrade of the US Navy 14"/50 caliber railway gun. Only four were deployed; two in the Harbor Defenses of Los Angeles and two in the Panama Canal Zone, where they could be shifted between the harbor defenses of Cristobal (Atlantic) or Balboa (Pacific).

== History ==
After the close of World War I, the US Army wanted to incorporate the lessons learned from other railway gun mounts and fulfill coastal artillery requirements for hitting a moving target. An effort to design a more universal mount for the Navy's Mk. IV 14"/50 caliber gun was undertaken.

The primary difference from the earlier Navy versions lies in the M1920 carriage, which could be raised and lowered. Prepositioned fixed mounts were installed at the forts, and the gun's rail trucks could be taken out from under the frame. After the removal of the rail trucks, the gun was lowered and bolted onto a pivot point for rapid 360 degree movement, necessary for tracking ships in coast defense. The M1920 carriage made the gun much more flexible. It allowed for the standard practice of using a curved piece of rail to traverse the gun, and it enabled the gun to be used in a fixed position.

Two guns were deployed to Fort MacArthur in the Harbor Defenses of Los Angeles, with firing platforms at Fort MacArthur and Long Beach. The remaining two guns were deployed to Fort Grant and Fort Randolph in the Panama Canal Zone. The two guns deployed to the Panama Canal Zone could be moved to either coast on the Panama Canal Railway. After World War Two ended, the threat of a massive war was over and the United States scrapped these weapons as well.

== Models ==
The Mk.IV gun was manufactured in two models:

- M1920MI centerline of breechblock mechanism canted 16 degrees counterclockwise to fit recoil band
- M1920MII breech mechanism is set straight in relation to axis of tube.

== Sighting and fire control equipment ==
The following sighting equipment was used with the gun:

- bore sight
- firing tables- 14-m-1, 14-e-3, 14-g-2.
- M1 fire adjustment board
- M1 generating unit (mounted on the forward railway truck)
- M1 gunners quadrant
- M1 plotting and relocating board
- M1 prediction scale
- M1A1 height finder
- M1A1 range correction board
- M7 spotting board
- M8 helium filling kit
- M1910 azimuth instrument
- M1912A1 clinometer
- M1917MI panoramic telescope
- M1918 aiming rule
- M1922 panoramic telescope

== Support cars ==
- M1 powder car
- M1 projectile car
- M2 fire control car
- M1918 repair car

== Fate ==
All four guns were cut up for scrap in 1946.

== Gallery ==
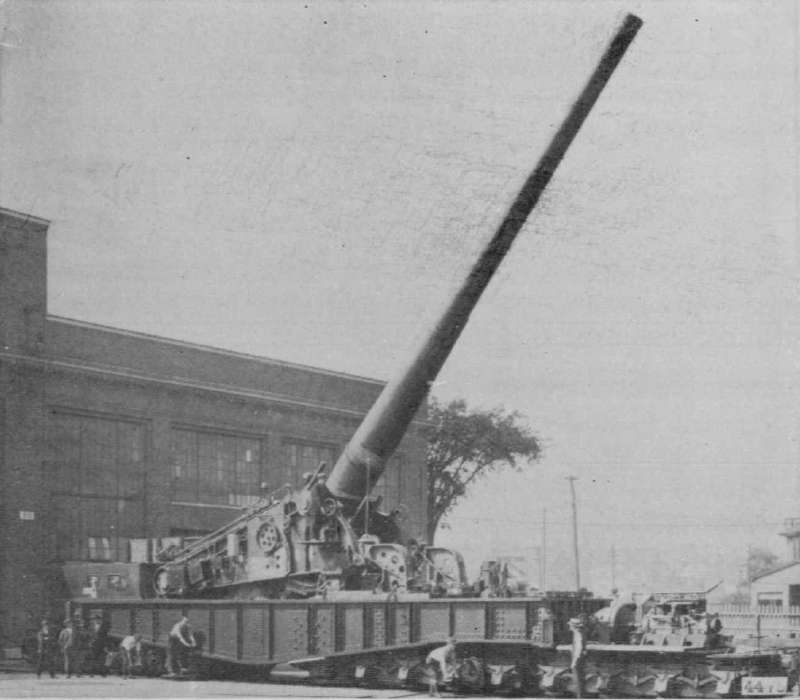
A M1920 on the test range.

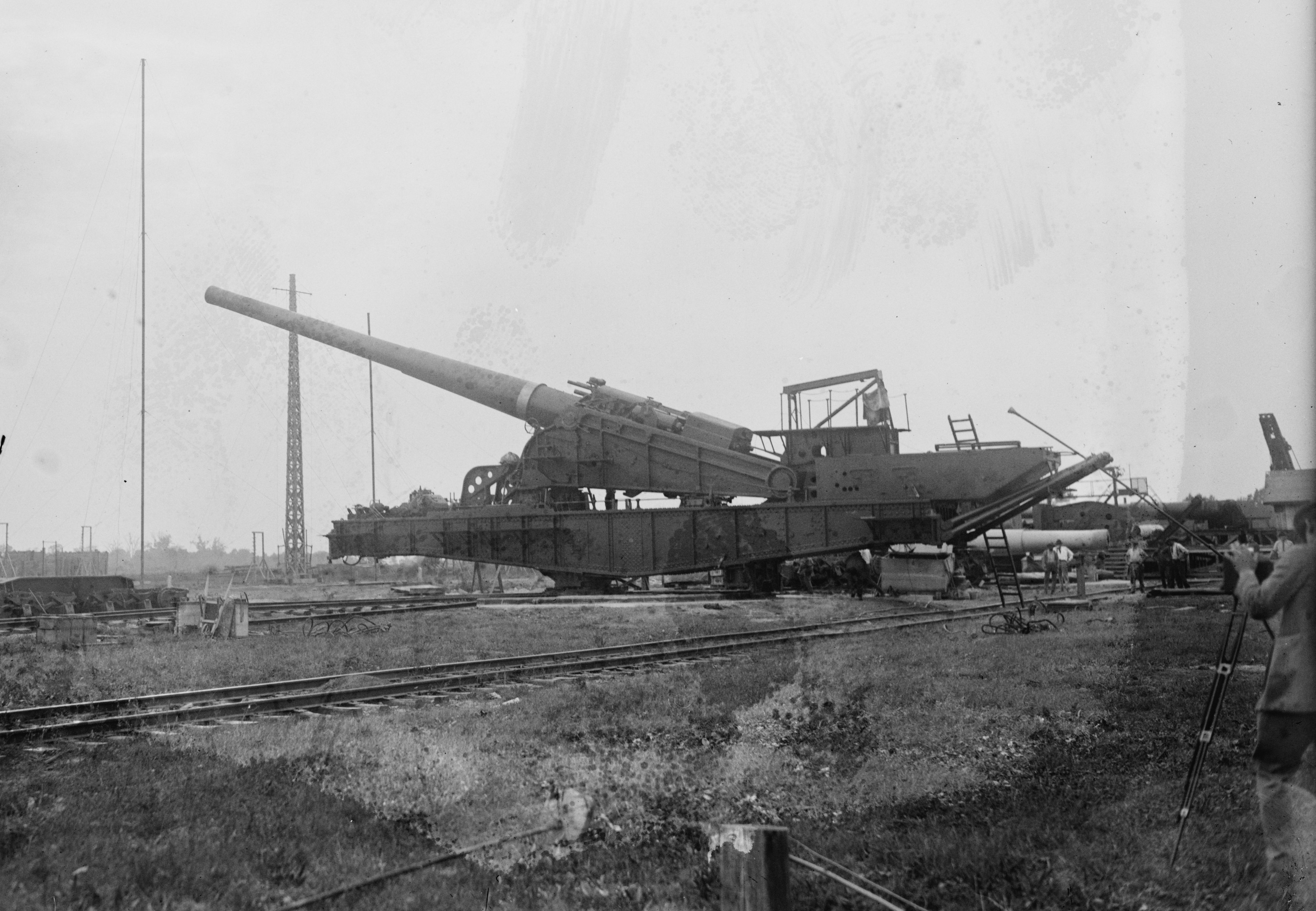
A M1920 on the test range.

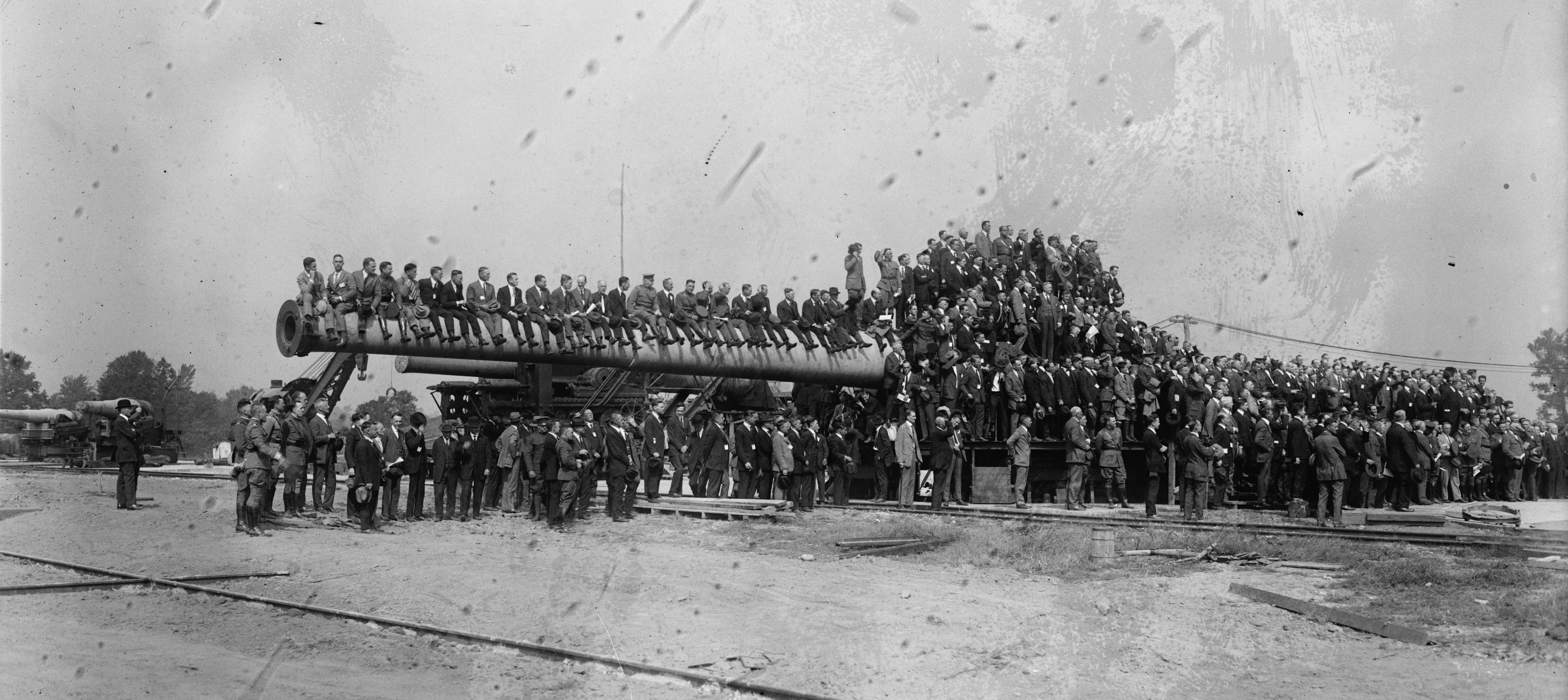
A group photo with a M1920.

== See also ==
- 14"/50 caliber railway gun US World War I predecessor
- Angular mil
- Coast Artillery fire control system
- Coincidence rangefinder
- Gun laying
- Indirect fire
- List of U.S. Army weapons by supply catalog designation
- Railway gun
- Sound ranging
