= TM-1-14 =

WW2 Soviet heavy railway gun

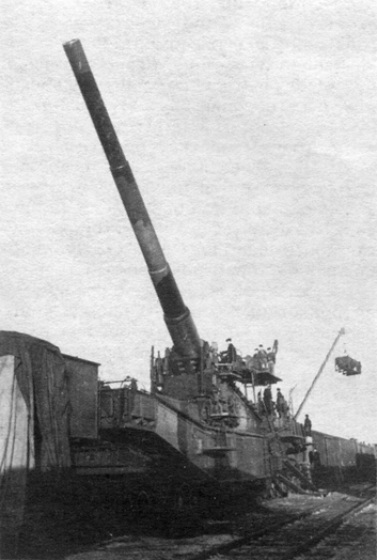
- TM-1-14
- Type: Railway Gun
- Place of origin: Soviet Union

Service history
- In service: 1932–1952
- Used by: Soviet Union
- Wars: World War II

Production history
- Designed: 1930
- Manufacturer: OGPU Special Design and Technology Bureau (OKTB)
- Produced: 1932–1935
- No. built: 6

Specifications
- Mass: 412 t (405 long tons; 454 short tons); Cannon: 83.3 t (82.0 long tons; 91.8 short tons)
- Length: 35.82 m (118 ft)
- Barrel length: L/52
- Height: 5.35 m (18 ft)
- Shell weight: Armour piercing 747 kg (1,647 lb); High explosive 473 kg (1,043 lb)
- Caliber: 356 mm (14.0 in)
- Elevation: +50°
- Traverse: 360°
- Rate of fire: 45 rounds per day.
- Muzzle velocity: 731 m/s (2,398 ft/s)
- Maximum firing range: Armour piercing 31 km (19 mi); High explosive 65 km (40 mi)

The TM-1-14 was a Soviet railway gun from the Second World War with a caliber of 356 mm.

== Description ==
The barrel, with a weight of 83.3 t (82.0 long tons; 91.8 short tons), came from the battle-cruisers of the Borodino-class, which were never completed.

The armour piercing shells, with a weight of 747 kg (1,647 lb), flew up to 31 km (19 mi), with a speed of 731 m/s (2,398 ft/s). Later versions, with a weight of 512.5 kg (1,130 lb), flew up to 44.4 km (27.6 mi), with a speed of 950 m/s (3,117 ft/s). High explosive shells, with a weight of 473 kg (1,043 lb) reached up to 65 km (40 mi). 3 charges were used.

In transport-configuration the height was 5.35 m (18 ft). Transition to firing-configuration took one to three hours, where lifting up the gun took 23 minutes.

A rate of fire of 45 rounds per day could be attained.

The gun also could be installed on a firing platform.

Three guns each were in service with the 6th Railway Battery of the Pacific Fleet and the 11th Battery of the Baltic Fleet.
