= Obusier de 370 modèle 1915 =

Obusier de 370 modèle 1915 à berceau
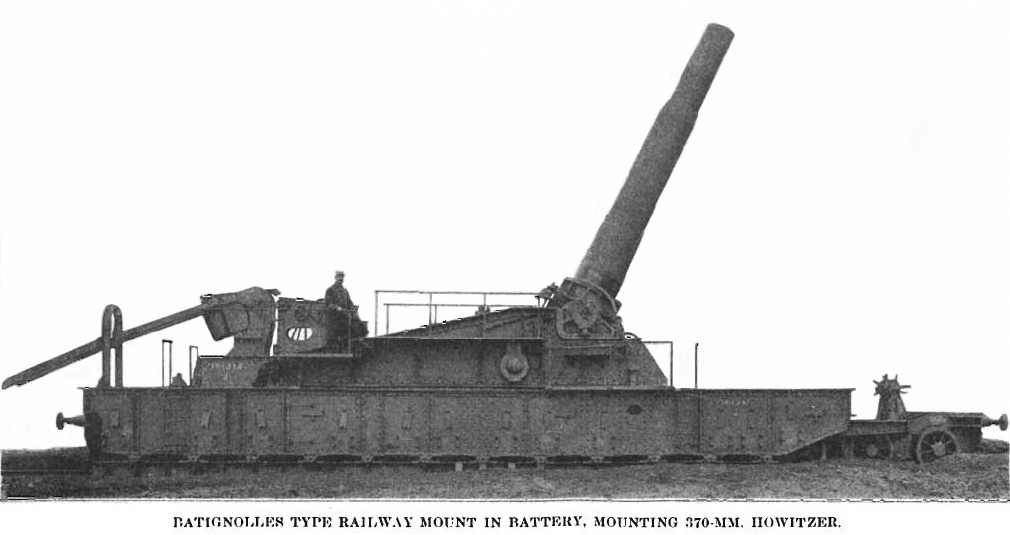
- An obusier de 370 mle 1915 at full elevation
- Type: Railway gun
- Place of origin: France

Service history
- In service: 1915–1945
- Used by: France; Germany
- Wars: World War I World War II

Production history
- Designed: 1915
- Manufacturer: Schneider; Batignolles
- Produced: 1917
- No. built: 8 plus 4 spare barrels

Specifications
- Mass: 127–134 t (125–132 long tons)
- Barrel length: 9.25 m (30 ft 4 in) L/25
- Shell: Separate loading bagged charges and projectiles
- Caliber: 370 mm (15 in)
- Breech: Welin breech block
- Recoil: Hydro-pneumatic
- Carriage: 2 railroad bogies, 4 axles each
- Elevation: -6° to +65°
- Traverse: 12°
- Rate of fire: 1 round every 6 minutes
- Muzzle velocity: 475–535 m/s (1,560–1,760 ft/s)
- Effective firing range: 14.7–16.5 km (9.1–10.3 mi)

The Obusier de 370 modèle 1915 à berceau was a French Railroad Gun that saw action during the First World War and Second World War.

== History ==
Although the majority of combatants had heavy field artillery prior to the outbreak of the First World War, none had adequate numbers of heavy guns in service, nor had they foreseen the growing importance of heavy artillery once the Western Front stagnated and trench warfare set in. Since aircraft of the period were not yet capable of carrying large diameter bombs the burden of delivering heavy firepower fell on the artillery. Two sources of heavy artillery suitable for conversion to field use were surplus coastal defense guns and naval guns.

However, a paradox faced artillery designers of the time, while large caliber naval guns were common, large caliber land weapons were less common due to their weight, complexity, and lack of mobility. Large caliber field guns often required extensive site preparation because the guns had to be broken down into multiple loads light enough to be towed by a horse team or the few traction engines of the time and then reassembled before use. Building a new gun could address the problem of disassembling, transporting and reassembling a large gun, but it didn't necessarily address how to convert existing heavy weapons to make them more mobile. Rail transport proved to be the most practical solution because the problems of heavy weight, lack of mobility and reduced setup time were addressed.

== Design ==
=== The barrels ===
With the success of the Obusier de 400 Modèle 1915/1916 in mind, the French Army requested more of these guns for service. The mle 1915 was a conversion of an existing naval gun, the 340 mm (13 in) L/45 mle 1887, by shortening them to 25 calibers and boring them out to 400 mm, but these gun barrels were in short supply. An alternative was to perform the same kind of conversion to Canon de 305 mm Modèle 1887 gun barrels to create 370 mm (15 in) L/25 guns. It was proposed to convert eight gun barrels to railway artillery with another four spare barrels. The barrels for these guns would come from decommissioned ships of the Charles Martel class of pre-dreadnought battleships and Bouvines class coastal defense ships. The work of building the guns was split between Schneider and Batignolles each producing four guns.

Like the earlier Obusier de 400 mm mle 1915/1916 the Obusier de 370 mm mle 1915 was considered a howitzer instead of a gun, so range and velocity were not primary considerations. Instead, high angle fire, projectile weight, and explosive yield were the primary considerations. The gun had a Welin breech block and the gun used separate loading bagged charges and projectiles. There were slight differences between the two groups of four guns. For example, a 370 mle 1915 with gun barrels from the battleship Charles Martel weighed 127 tonnes, while the others from the Bouvines class of coastal defense ships weighed 134 tonnes. Whether there were any ballistic differences between the finished pieces is unknown.

=== Before and after ===
Compared to the original naval gun, the mle 1915 barrel is 33% shorter, the projectile weighs 2-3 times as much, the muzzle velocity is only 60% of the original, but the range of the projectile is actually greater due to firing at greater angles of elevation.

Comparison of the 305 mm mle 1887 & 370 mm mle 1915
	Length	Projectile	Velocity	Range
mle 1887	13.9 m (45 ft 7 in) L/45	292–340 kg (644–750 lb)	780–815 m/s (2,560–2,670 ft/s)	12 km (7.5 mi) at 15°
mle 1915	9.25 m (30 ft 4 in) L/25	641–900 kg (1,413–1,984 lb)	475–535 m/s (1,560–1,760 ft/s)	14.7–16.5 km (9.1–10.3 mi) at 65°

=== The carriage ===
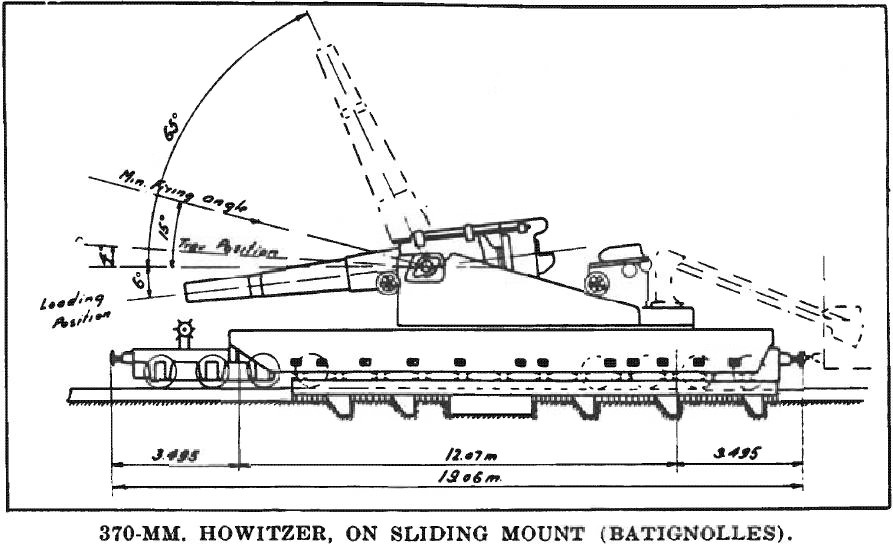
A diagram showing the Batignolles carriage system.

Each gun sat on a rectangular steel base which was suspended from two railroad bogies with four axles each. The number of axles was determined by the weight limit for European railways of 17 tonnes per axle and 17x8 = 136 tonnes. The howitzers had a hydro-pneumatic cradle recoil system where the cradle recoiled up a slightly inclined rear deck which helped return the howitzer to battery after firing. The carriage used a car traversing mount so traverse was limited to a few degrees each side of the howitzers centerline. To load the gun the barrel was lowered to -6° and a loading ramp to the gun's breech could be erected.

The guns were mounted on Batignolles style rail mounts which consisted of five steel cross ties with integral spades which were driven between the railroad ties. On top of these steel ties, two heavy girders were laid parallel to the tracks which bolted to the ties. The girders were equipped with 12 sets of flanges that matched the same number on the carriage. When the carriage was over the flanges the carriage was fastened to the girders and the ties. Once the platform was ready, the piece could be anchored in minutes and ready to fire. The ties and girders supported the weight of the carriage and absorbed the gun's recoil, the track did not have to be reinforced. A pit was also dug under the gun's breech and lined with a steel box to allow the gun to recoil at high angles of elevation, which took about 3 hours. The Batignolles mounts also employed car-traverse which allowed for limited traverse by shifting the carriage on its bogies. When the United States entered the First World War a license to produce Berceau style rail mounts was negotiated with Batignolles and the carriage used by the 12-inch M1895 railway gun was similar.

== Battery organization ==
French railroad batteries usually consisted of two trains. The first was the firing train, with a locomotive, a workshop wagon, two ammunition carriages, and one or two railway guns. The second was the administrative train, with a locomotive, additional ammunition carriages, a headquarters wagon, three or more berthing carriages, a kitchen wagon, and carriages for construction material and lifting equipment.

== Ammunition ==
There were four different types of ammunition provided:

- Obus D Mle 1915 en acier à amorçage de tête, 641 kg (1,413 lb) range 16.1 km (10 mi)
- Obus en acier à double amorcage, 652 kg (1,437 lb) range 16 km (10 mi)
- Obus en fonte acierée à amorçage de culot, 890 kg (1,960 lb) range 15.1 km (9.4 mi)
- Obus Mle 1915 en acier à amorcage de culot, 900 kg (2,000 lb) range 14.7 km (9 mi)

== World War I ==
During the German Spring Offensive 1918, four mle 1915 guns were captured by the German army. One of these was destroyed, while the other three were deployed by the Germans and returned to France after the armistice.

== World War II ==
Ten howitzers were mobilized by the French Army at the beginning of the Second World War. Six were deployed to batteries of the 371° Regiment of the ALVF (Artillery lourde sur voie ferrée) to reinforce the Maginot Line defenses. After the Fall of France the Germans used eight under the designation 37 cm Haubitze (Eisenbahn) 711(f) and used them throughout the second world war.

== Photo Gallery ==
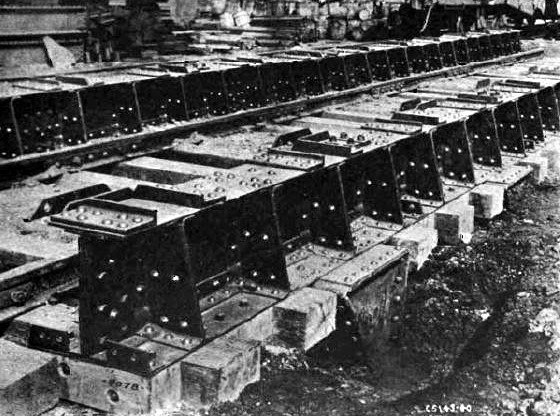
Details of the anchoring for the Batignolles mount.

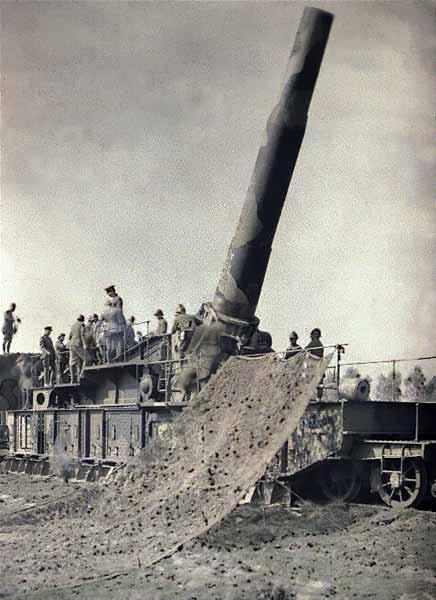
A mle 1915 with its barrel elevated.

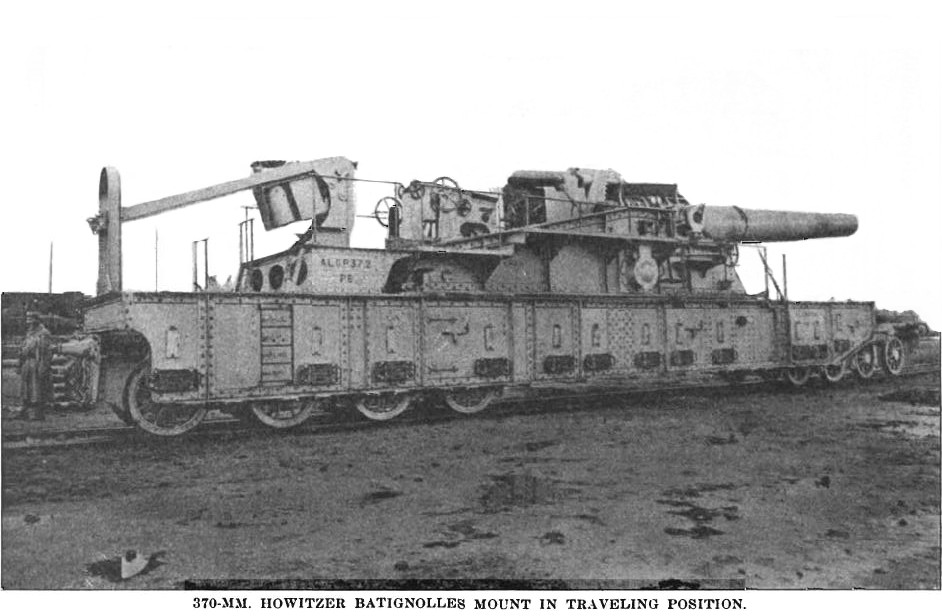
A mle 1915 in traveling position.

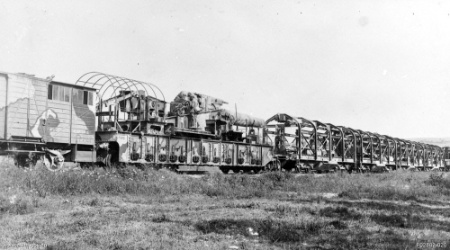
A mle 1915 with its supply carriages.

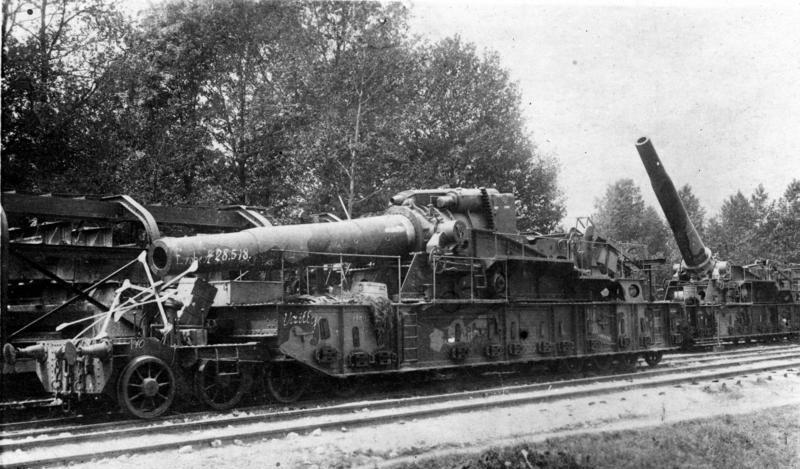
Two mle 1915's captured by the Germans in WWII.
