= Obusier de 400 Modèle 1915/1916 =

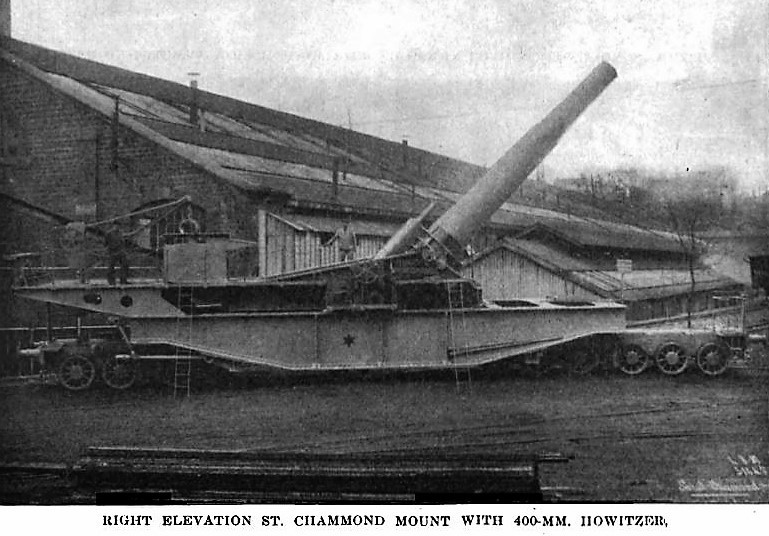
- French 400 mm (16 in) howitzer
- Type: Railway gun
- Place of origin: France

Service history
- In service: 1916–1945
- Used by: France; Germany; United States
- Wars: World War I World War II

Production history
- Designed: 1915
- Manufacturer: St Chamond
- Produced: 1916-1918
- No. built: 8 × mle 1915; 4 × mle 1916

Specifications
- Mass: Complete: 137 t (135 long tons); Barrel: 47.5 t (46.7 long tons)
- Length: 19 m (62 ft 4 in)
- Barrel length: 10.65 m (34 ft 11 in) L/25
- Shell: Separate loading bagged charges and projectiles
- Caliber: 400 mm (16 in)
- Breech: Welin breech block
- Recoil: Hydro-pneumatic
- Carriage: 1×4 axle bogie and 1×6 axle bogie
- Elevation: -8° to +65°
- Traverse: 12°
- Rate of fire: 1 round every 5 minutes
- Muzzle velocity: 465–530 m/s (1,530–1,740 ft/s)
- Effective firing range: 13–14 km (8.1–8.7 mi)
- Maximum firing range: 16 km (9.9 mi)

The Obusier de 400 Modèle 1915/1916 were French railway howitzers that saw action during the First World War and World War II. The mle 1915/1916 was the largest caliber railway howitzers in service with the French Army during the First World War.

== History ==
Although the majority of combatants had heavy field artillery prior to the outbreak of the First World War, none had adequate numbers of heavy guns in service, nor had they foreseen the growing importance of heavy artillery once the Western Front stagnated and trench warfare set in. Since aircraft of the period were not yet capable of carrying large diameter bombs the burden of delivering heavy firepower fell on the artillery. Two sources of heavy artillery suitable for conversion to field use were surplus coastal defense guns and naval guns.

A paradox faced artillery designers, while large caliber naval guns were common, large caliber land weapons were less common due to their weight, complexity and lack of mobility. Large caliber field guns often required extensive site preparation because the guns had to be dismantled into loads light enough to be towed by a horse team or the few traction engines of the time. Building a new gun could address the problem of taking apart, transporting and reassembling a large gun but this did not make existing heavy weapons any more mobile. Rail transport proved to be the most practical solution because the problems of heavy weight, lack of mobility and reduced setup time were addressed.

== Design ==
Perhaps influenced by the success of the German's Big Bertha 420 mm (17 in) howitzer at the Belgian forts at Liège, Namur, and Antwerp and the French fort at Maubeuge the French Army issued a requirement for new super-heavy artillery capable of destroying deeply dug in German trenches and concrete fortifications. Existing 200–300 mm (7.9–11.8 in) coastal defense guns and siege mortars had proven to be only moderately effective, so the new weapon would need to be much larger. High-angle fire, projectile weight and explosive yield were the primary considerations. Since the mle 1915/1916 were classified as howitzers instead of guns the barrel did not need to be very long. The lack of spare industrial capacity or materials to produce a new weapon led to a decision to convert surplus naval gun barrels instead.

=== Barrels ===
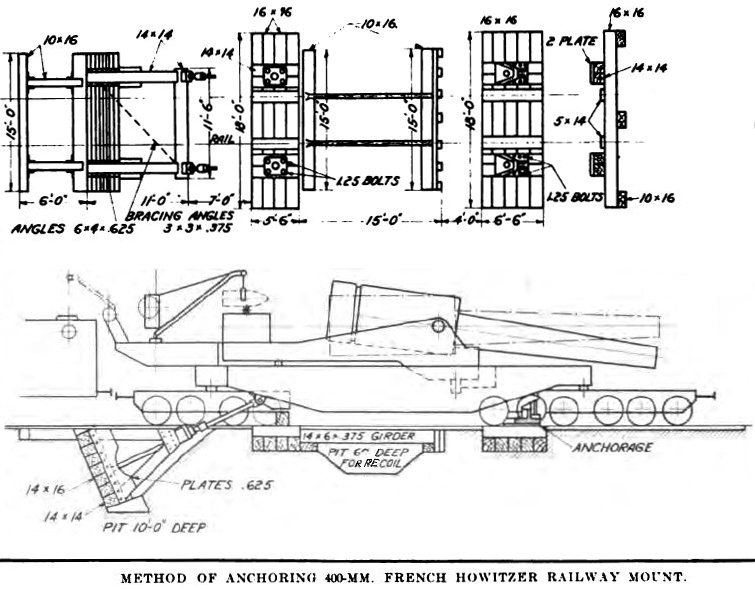
A mle 1915/1916 showing the details of its site preparation.

There were two models of howitzer produced, the mle 1915 and the mle 1916 which were differentiated by the gun barrels used:

- On July 22, 1915, at the request of the French GHQ, the Ministry of War ordered the construction of eight model 1915 howitzers and rail carriages from Saint Chamond. The barrels for these howitzers were a conversion of existing Canon de 340 mm (13 in) Modèle 1887 L/42 naval guns which were shortened to 25 calibers and bored out to 400 mm (16 in). The barrels came from the decommissioned pre-dreadnought battleship Brennus and the two Valmy-class coastal defense ships. Six barrels were converted in 1915, with three others following in early 1916. Of the nine barrels converted, eight were rail mounted while the ninth tube served as a test piece on the Gâvres firing range.
- A second order was placed in January 1917 for four more model 1916 howitzers and rail carriages with three spare barrels, which were a conversion of Canon de 340 mm (13 in) Modèle 1912 L/45 naval guns which were shortened to 25 calibers and bored out to 400 mm. These came from the canceled Normandie-class dreadnought battleships. Both the mle 1915 and mle 1916 had the same general characteristics and used the same projectiles. The theoretical barrel life was 1,000 rounds and in case of severe barrel wear it was planned to bore the barrels out again to 415 mm (16.3 in), but this was never implemented.

=== Comparison ===
Compared to the original naval gun and the modified howitzer, the mle 1915/1916 barrel is 25% shorter, the largest projectile weighs nearly twice as much, the muzzle velocity is only 60 per cent of the original and the range of the projectile is slightly shorter despite firing at greater angles of elevation.

Comparison of the 340 mm mle 1887 & 400 mm mle 1915/1916
	Length	Projectile	Velocity	Range
mle 1887	14.13 m (46 ft 4 in) L/42	420–490 kg (930–1,080 lb)	740–780 m/s (2,400–2,600 ft/s)	18 km (11 mi) at 18°
mle 1915/1916	10.65 m (34 ft 11 in) L/25	641–900 kg (1,413–1,984 lb)	465–530 m/s (1,530–1,740 ft/s)	15.1–16 km (9.4–9.9 mi) at 65°

=== Other conversions ===
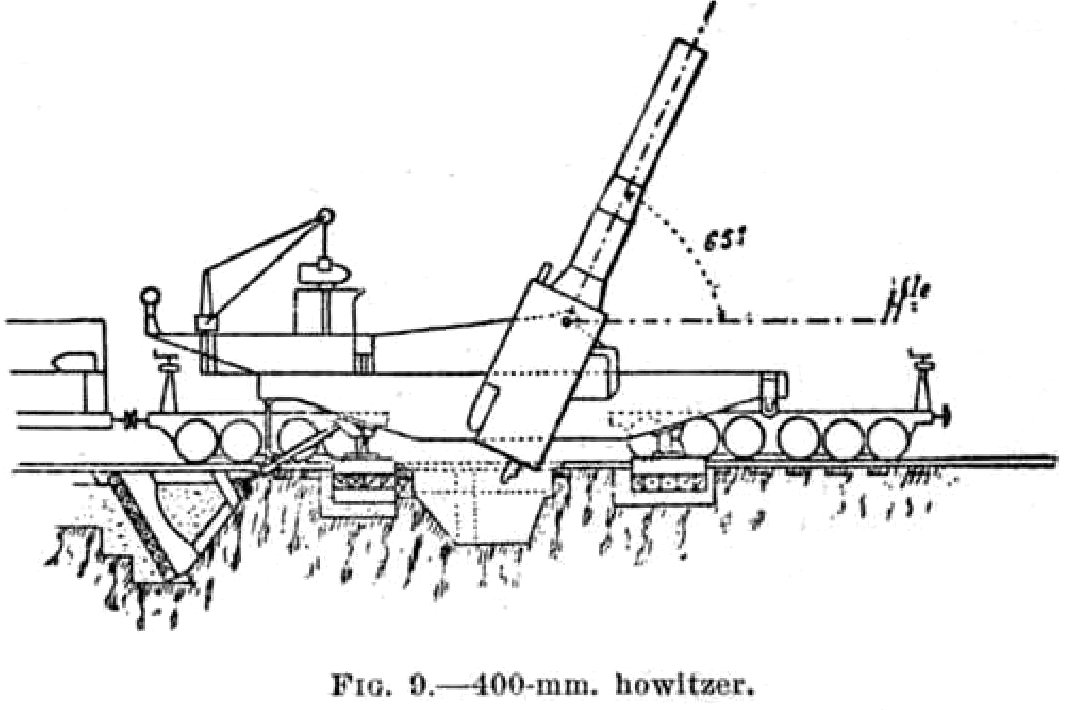
A mle 1915/1916 in firing position showing the recoil and earth anchor pits.

With the success of the mle 1915/1916 in mind, the French Army requested more howitzers be built but a lack of 340 mm barrels suitable for conversion forced them to find an alternative. Surplus Canon de 305 mm (12 in) Modèle 1887 L/45 naval guns were converted to 370 mm (15 in) using the same process of shortening the barrels, boring them out and building rail carriages for them. The resulting eight howitzers and four spare barrels were called the Obusier de 370 modèle 1915 and they served alongside the Obusier de 400 Modèle 1915/1916 in both world wars.

=== Rail carriage ===
The railway carriage for the howitzers was called the affut à Berceau Saint-Chamond and was used on a number of different railway guns. The howitzers were mounted on rectangular steel bases, which were suspended on two railway bogies. The rear bogie had four axles, while the front bogie had six axles. The number of axles was determined by the weight limit for European railways of 17 t (17 long tons) per axle and 17 × 10 = 170 t (170 long tons). Since the barrels were naval guns that were not intended for use at high angles of elevation the trunnions were relocated relatively far forward and the howitzers were nose heavy which is why the front bogie had more axles than the rear.

The howitzers had a Welin breech block and used separate loading bagged charges and projectiles. To load the howitzer the barrel was lowered to -8° and a loading ramp to the howitzer's breech could be erected. The howitzers had a hydro-pneumatic cradle recoil system where the cradle recoiled up a slightly inclined rear deck which helped return the howitzer to battery after firing. The carriage used ground platform anchoring and the rear bogie could be jacked up to help absorb recoil. The carriage used a car traversing mount so traverse was limited to a few degrees each side of the howitzer centerline. The howitzers normally required two days of setup before firing, which consisted of reinforcing an area of track with wooden beams and digging a pit for the earth anchor and another for howitzers breech at angles of elevation more than 45°. There were also four jack stands that could be lowered onto the platform and fastened to the timbers to provide a stable firing platform.

== Battery organization ==
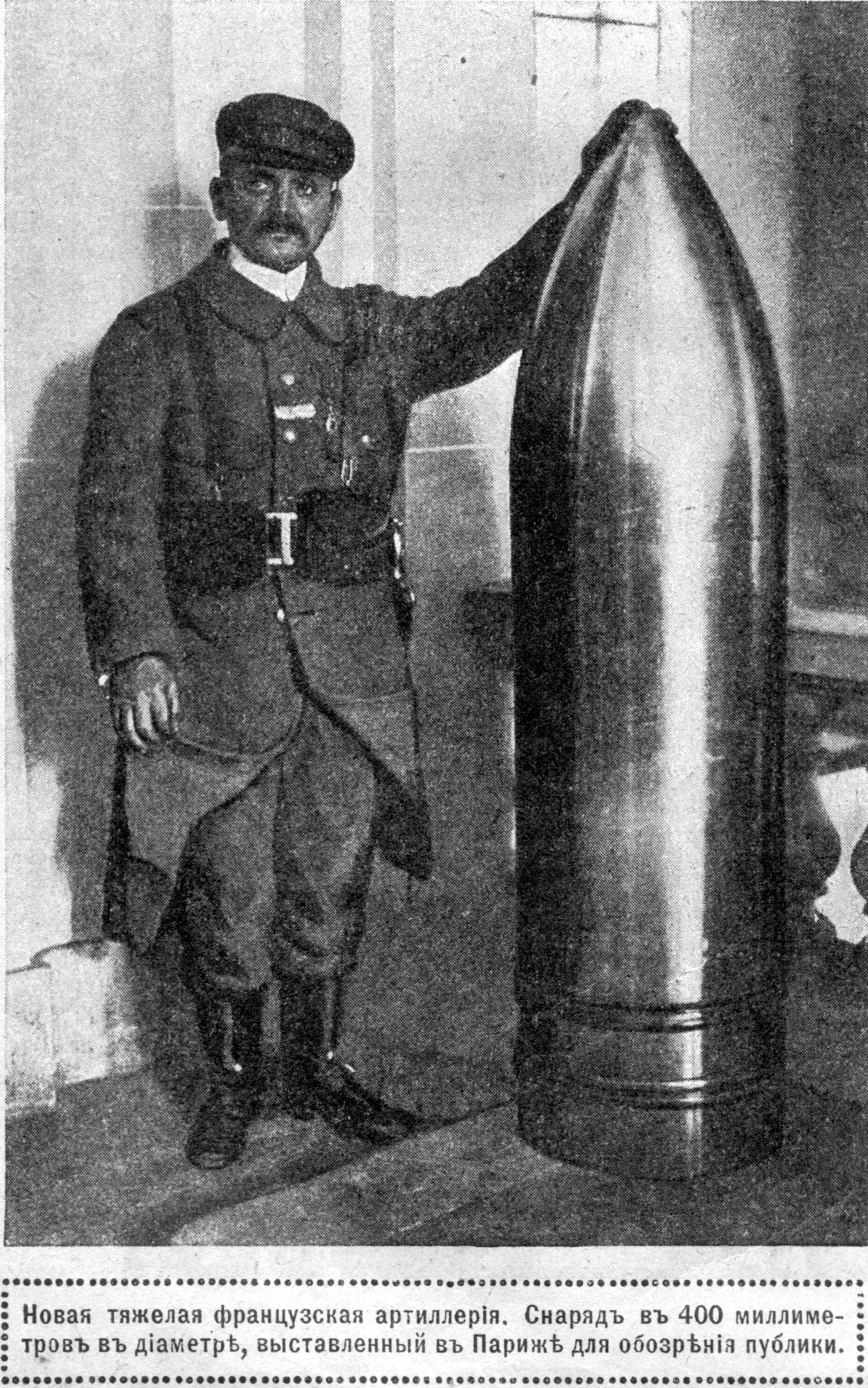
Size comparison

French railway batteries usually consisted of two trains. The first was the firing train, with a locomotive, a workshop wagon, two ammunition carriages, and one or two railway guns. The second was the administrative train, with a locomotive, additional ammunition carriages, a headquarters wagon, three or more berthing carriages, a kitchen wagon and carriages for construction material and lifting equipment. In 1916 there were four batteries and in 1918 six batteries, each with two howitzers per army. Each battery was commanded by a captain of artillery, with a lieutenant and 125 men.

== First world war ==
=== Verdun ===
The first use of the mle 1915/1916 was during the Battle of Verdun. Two mle 1915/1916's (those of the 77th Battery of the 3rd Foot Artillery Regiment) were deployed 13 km (8.1 mi) to the south-west at Baleycourt to participate in the preparation for the French counteroffensive on October 21, 1916. It is estimated that 373 rounds of 370 mm and 400 mm were fired during this battle. Fort Douaumont was the first to be hit and then Fort Vaux. On October 23, 1916, of the fifty or so shells striking the fort, six pierced the concrete, earth, and masonry defensive works. The first exploded in the infirmary, another in the hallway, three others smashed a casemate attached to the barracks and lastly, a munitions depot was hit, triggering a fire. Explosions and toxic gases forced the German garrison to evacuate the fort, allowing the French to reoccupy it the next day.

=== The Somme ===
The next use of the mle 1915/1916 was during the artillery preparation of the Battle of the Somme. From June 30, 1916, they shelled the commune of Morcourt and reduced the fortified villages of Herbécourt, Estrées and Belloy-en-Santerre to ruins.

=== Second Battle of the Aisne ===
In April 1917, the French offensive on the Chemin des Dames was accompanied by attacks north of Reims. The preparatory artillery bombardment fell on the forts of Brimont, Witry-lès-Reims and Berru, as well as tunnels and shelters under Mount Cornillet and Mont-sans-nom. The three tunnels were up to 30 m (98 ft) underground and could accommodate up to three battalions which could be used for German counter-attacks. Aerial photographs showed the entrances and the ventilation shafts of this subterranean complex. This, supplemented by information provided by a prisoner, led to them being targeted. The first twelve shots targeted the tunnel's entrances to trap the Germans inside. On May 20, 1917, the ventilation shafts were bombarded and one of the shells, fired from Mourmelon-le-Petit penetrated 30 m (98 ft 5 in) of limestone and exploded in the gallery killing more than 400 German troops who died in the explosion, tunnel collapse and asphyxiation.

=== United States service ===
At least two of these weapons were operated by the 53rd Coast Artillery Regiment, Coast Artillery Corps in France during World War I (almost all US Army-manned heavy and railway artillery in that war was operated by Coast Artillery units). The US Army built a one-off experimental 16-inch (406 mm) railway howitzer M1918 with some influence from the French design. Based on experience with these weapons, the Coast Artillery abandoned the low-angle disappearing carriage (after deploying one at Fort Michie, New York) for its next generation of large coast defense guns, the 16-inch gun M1919 and the 16-inch howitzer M1920. Barbette carriages with an elevation of 65 degrees were designed for the new weapons to allow plunging fire as enemy ships approached; this type of carriage was later used for new installations of 16-inch ex-Navy guns in World War II.

== Second World War ==
All twelve howitzers were deployed to batteries of the 371° Regiment of the ALVF (Artillery lourde sur voie ferrée) in the Alsace and Lorraine area to reinforce the Maginot Line defenses. They saw no action due to a lack of targets in those sectors. After the French Armistice, eight of these were used by the Germans as 40 cm Haubitze (Eisenbahn) 752(f). Two batteries (Nos. 693 and 686) were composed of three howitzers each and were engaged during the Siege of Leningrad, the other two acted as spares. None are thought to have survived World War II.

== Ammunition ==
Ammunition types
	Shell weight	Charge1	Velocity	Range	Charge2	Velocity	Range	Charge3	Velocity	Range
High explosive	900 kg (2,000 lb)	36.5 kg (80 lb)	330 m/s (1,100 ft/s)	9.58 km (5.95 mi)	46 kg (101 lb)	385 m/s (1,260 ft/s)	12 km (7.5 mi)	74 kg (163 lb)	465 m/s (1,530 ft/s)	15.8 km (9.8 mi)
Common	890 kg (1,960 lb)	36 kg (79 lb)	330 m/s (1,100 ft/s)	3.58 km (2.22 mi)	46 kg (101 lb)	385 m/s (1,260 ft/s)	11.9 km (7.4 mi)	74 kg (163 lb)	465 m/s (1,530 ft/s)	15.1 km (9.4 mi)
Armor piercing	641 kg (1,413 lb)	29 kg (64 lb)	345 m/s (1,130 ft/s)	10.2 km (6.3 mi)	39.5 kg (87 lb)	420 m/s (1,400 ft/s)	12.8 km (8.0 mi)	66.3 kg (146 lb)	530 m/s (1,700 ft/s)	16 km (9.9 mi)

== Photo Gallery ==
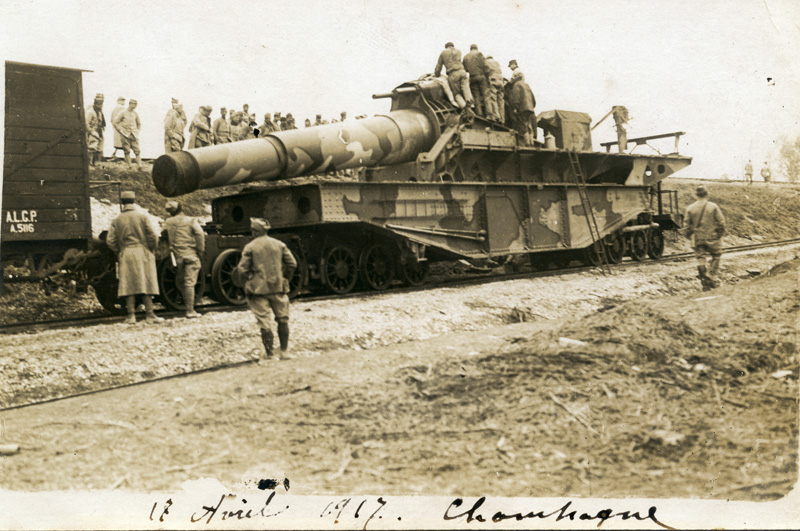
A mle 1915/1916 in travel position.

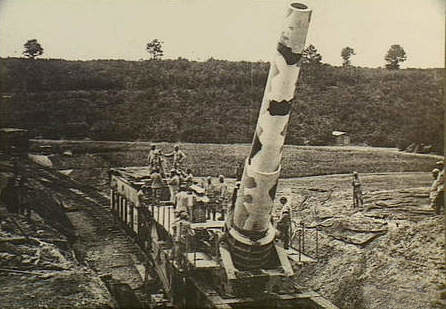
A mle 1915/1916 in firing position.

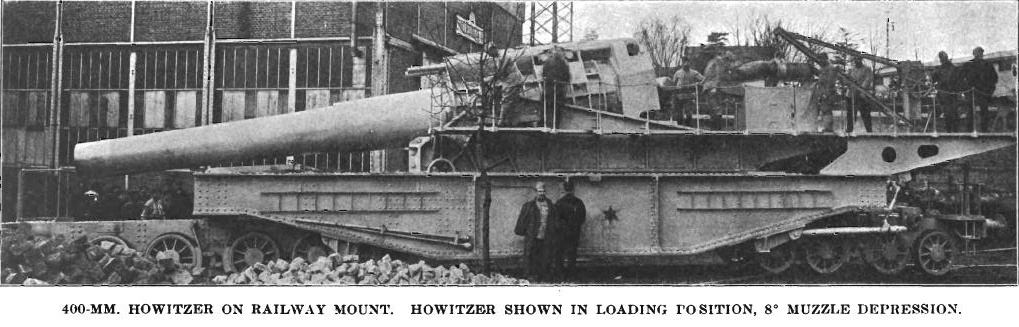
A mle 1915/1916 in loading position.

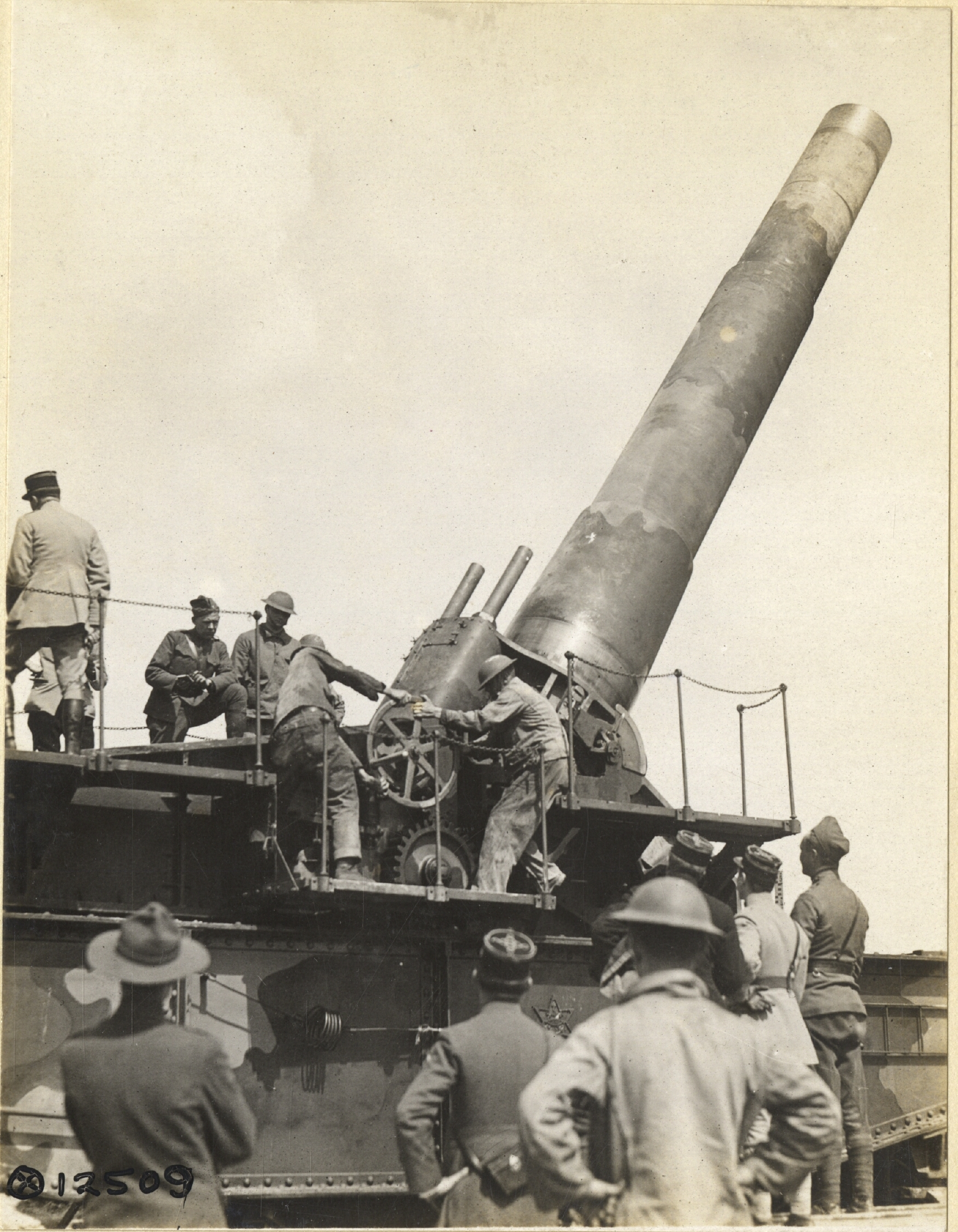
A mle 1915/1916 in service with US Army 53rd Coast Artillery 15 May 1918.

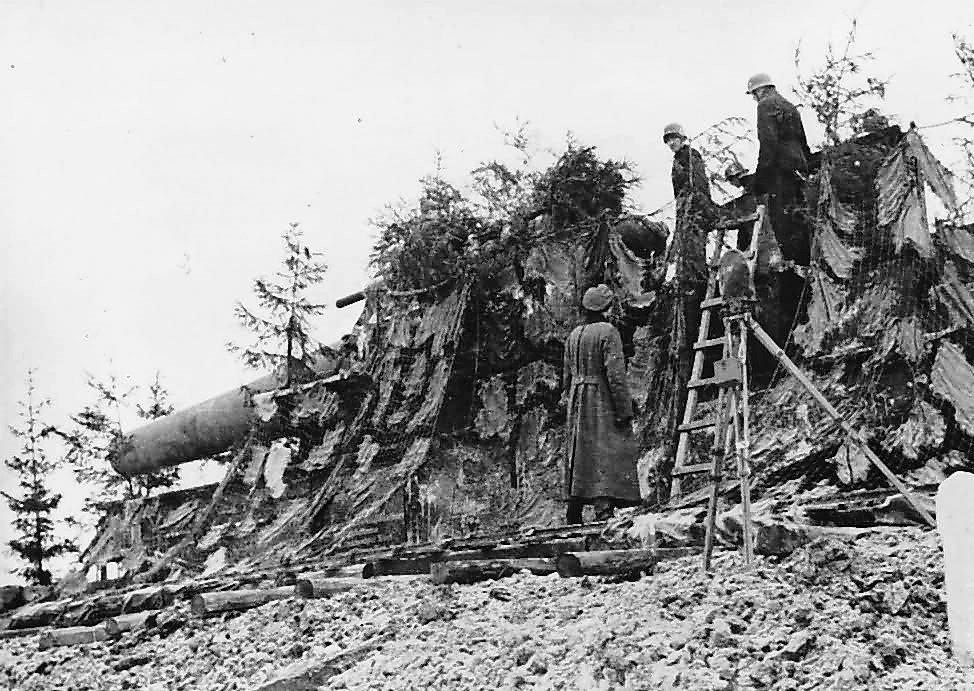
A 40 cm Haubitze (Eisenbahn) 752(f) near Leningrad.
