= Obusier de 520 modèle 1916 =

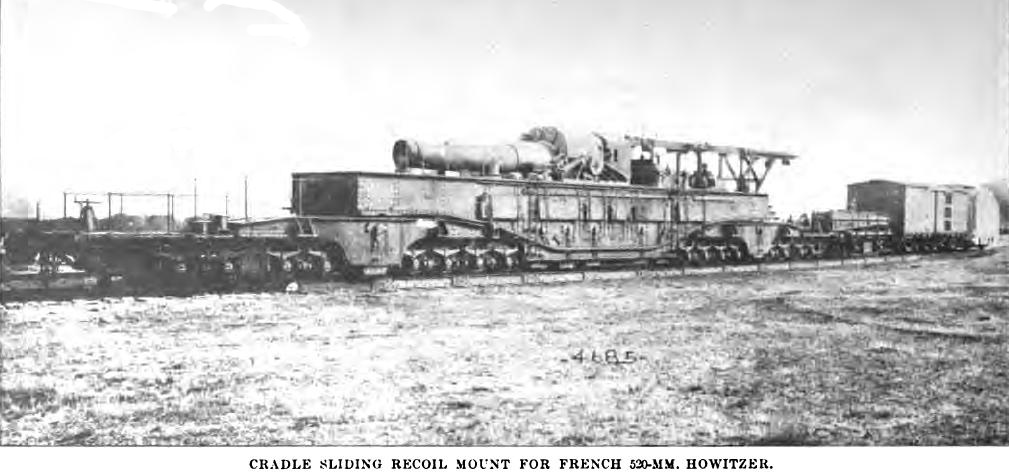
- Type: Railroad howitzer
- Place of origin: France

Service history
- In service: 1918–1942
- Used by: France; Nazi Germany
- Wars: World War II

Production history
- Designer: Schneider et Cie
- Designed: 1916–1917
- Manufacturer: Schneider et Cie
- Produced: 1917–1918
- No. built: 2

Specifications
- Mass: 263 tonnes (259 long tons; 290 short tons)
- Length: 30.38 m (99.7 ft)
- Barrel length: 11.9 m (39 ft) L/15
- Shell weight: 1,370 and 1,654 kg (3,020 and 3,646 lb)
- Caliber: 520 millimetres (20 in)
- Breech: interrupted screw
- Recoil: hydro-pneumatic
- Carriage: 2 x 8-axle trucks
- Elevation: +40° to +60° (firing)
- Traverse: none
- Rate of fire: 1 round per 6 minutes
- Muzzle velocity: 450 to 500 m/s (1,500 to 1,600 ft/s)
- Maximum firing range: 14,600 to 17,000 metres (16,000 to 18,600 yd)

The Obusier de 520 modèle 1916 was a French railway howitzer that was built during World War I, but did not see service before the war ended. One weapon was destroyed in firing trials and the other was captured by the Germans after France surrendered in 1940 and used by them in the siege of Leningrad. Both weapons were destroyed by premature detonations of shells in their barrels.

== Design ==
These howitzers were ordered in 1916 from Schneider, but development was protracted and the first weapon wasn't delivered until late 1917. They used a combination of cradle recoil and sliding recoil to handle the recoil forces generated by firing its enormous shells. A number of crossbeams mounted on the underside of the carriage were jacked down and clamped to the track to increase the friction, when the carriage was forced backwards about a 1 metre (1.1 yd) from the recoil forces which were not absorbed by the hydraulic buffers on the gun cradle. The mount was then jacked up and then moved back into firing position by hand-crank or electric motor. The gun had to be loaded at 0° elevation and thus had to be re-aimed for every shot. A prominent overhead trolley system mounted behind the gun carried the ammunition to the breech from the ammunition car. It fired shells weighing 1,370 and 1,654 kilograms (3,020 and 3,646 lb). Elevation and ammunition handling were electrically powered from a separate generator car connected by approximately 10 metres (11 yd) of cables.

== Combat history ==
The first howitzer was destroyed during firing trials at the range in Quiberon in July 1918, when a shell detonated prematurely in the barrel. The second gun was delivered in 1918, but didn't complete its firing trials before WWI ended. It was placed in a storage, but was not part of the French mobilization plans until after WW2 began. It needed to be refurbished before it could be committed to battle. It was captured in the Schneider workshops before it could fire a single round in anger.

The Germans placed it into service as the 52 cm Haubitze (E) 871(f) (French railroad howitzer) and it was assigned to Railroad Artillery Battery (Artillerie-Batterie (E.)) 686. It was not used in the opening stages of Operation Barbarossa, but arrived on the outskirts of Leningrad on 21 November 1941. It was destroyed when a shell detonated in the barrel on 5 January 1942. The abandoned wreckage was captured by the Soviets during Operation Iskra in 1943.
