= Canon de 19 modèle 1870/93 TAZ =

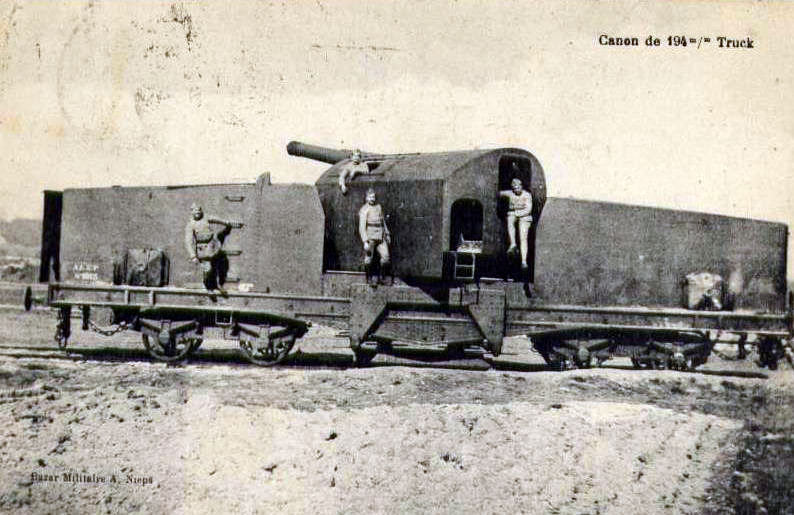
- Type: Railway gun
- Place of origin: France

Service history
- In service: 1915–1945
- Used by: France; Nazi Germany; Kingdom of Italy
- Wars: World War I World War II

Production history
- Designer: Schneider
- Designed: 1915
- Produced: 1915
- No. built: 26

Specifications
- Mass: 65 t (64 long tons; 72 short tons)
- Length: 14.6 m (48 ft)
- Barrel length: 5.8 m (19 ft) L/30
- Shell: Separate-loading, bagged charge and projectiles
- Shell weight: 85 kg (187 lb)
- Caliber: 194 mm (7.6 in)
- Breech: de Bange
- Recoil: Top-carriage recoil
- Carriage: Top carriage traverse on 4-axle carriage
- Elevation: -10° to +40°
- Traverse: 360°
- Rate of fire: 2 rpm
- Muzzle velocity: 640 m/s (2,100 ft/s)
- Maximum firing range: 18.3 km (11.4 mi)

The Canon de 19 modèle 1870/93 TAZ was a railway gun designed and built early in the First World War. It also saw action during the Second World War.

== History ==
Although the majority of combatants had heavy field artillery prior to the outbreak of the First World War, none had adequate numbers of heavy guns in service, nor had they foreseen the growing importance of heavy artillery once the Western Front stagnated and trench warfare set in. Since aircraft of the period were not yet capable of carrying large diameter bombs the burden of delivering heavy firepower fell on the artillery. Two sources of heavy artillery suitable for conversion to field use were surplus coastal defense guns and naval guns.

However, a paradox faced artillery designers of the time; while large caliber naval guns were common, large caliber land weapons were not due to their weight, complexity, and lack of mobility. Large caliber field guns often required extensive site preparation because the guns had to be broken down into multiple loads light enough to be towed by a horse team or the few traction engines of the time and then reassembled before use. Building a new gun could address the problem of disassembling, transporting and reassembling a large gun, but it didn't necessarily address how to convert existing heavy weapons to make them more mobile. Rail transport proved to be the most practical solution because the problems of heavy weight, lack of mobility and reduced setup time were addressed.

== Design ==
The Canon de 19 modèle 1870/93 TAZ began life as twenty-six Canon de 19 C modèle 1870/93 coastal defense guns which were converted by Schneider to railroad guns early in the First World War. They were typical built-up guns of the period with mixed construction consisting of a rifled steel liner and several layers of iron reinforcing hoops. In French service, guns of mixed steel/iron construction were designated in centimeters while all steel guns were designated in millimeters. However, reference materials do not always distinguish the difference in construction and use either unit of measurement. The guns used a de Bange breech and fired separate loading bagged charges and projectiles.

The first guns were converted and delivered to the French Army in the summer of 1915. The guns were mounted on a top carriage traversing mount with a large gun turret in the middle of an armored 4-axle rail carriage. The armor was sufficient to provide protection from shell splinters and gunfire. The ends of the carriage provided room for ammunition storage and the gun crew. The guns were normally connected to an ammunition car and the projectiles were passed from the ammunition car to the gun by an elevated chute. The turret was capable of 360° of traverse and carriages with this capability were known as Tous Azimuts or TAZ for short. Although capable of 360° of traverse the gun was returned to parallel the tracks so ammunition could be passed through to the gunners. The guns used a top-carriage recoil system where the gun sat on a cradle which held the trunnioned barrel. When fired a combination of hydraulic buffers and inclined rails on the firing platform returned the gun to position. The guns were capable of between -10° and +40° of elevation with a maximum range of 18.3 km (11.4 mi) and were often used for counter-battery fire. Once in position, a section of rail bed was reinforced with wooden beams and a combination of screw jacks and rail clamps stabilized the carriage during firing. It shared the same carriage as the Canon de 164 modèle 1893/96 TAZ.

== World War II ==
Twenty-four mle 1870/93 TAZ railway guns were mobilized at the beginning of the Second World War. Three guns were assigned to each of the batteries of the 1st, 2nd, 4th, 5th, 7th, 8th, 16th, and 17th Heavy Artillery Batteries of the 374° Regiment of the ALVF (Artillerie Lourde sur Voie Ferrée) stationed in Southern France facing the Italians. The 4th battery at Eze fired on the Italians advancing on Menton. After the fall of France, nine guns were used by the Germans as coastal defense artillery under the designation 19 cm K(E) 486(f). The Kingdom of Italy also received twelve guns after the Armistice of Villa Incisa and these were given the designation Cannone da 194/29 Modello 70/93. They were integrated into armored trains of the Royal Italian Army and assigned coastal defense duties. Guns in Italian service had their turret roofs removed (194 mm TAz Mle. 1870/93 ALVF Image). Their only action was 13 March 1944 with the Italian Co-belligerent Army during the Battle of Montelungo.

== Photo Gallery ==
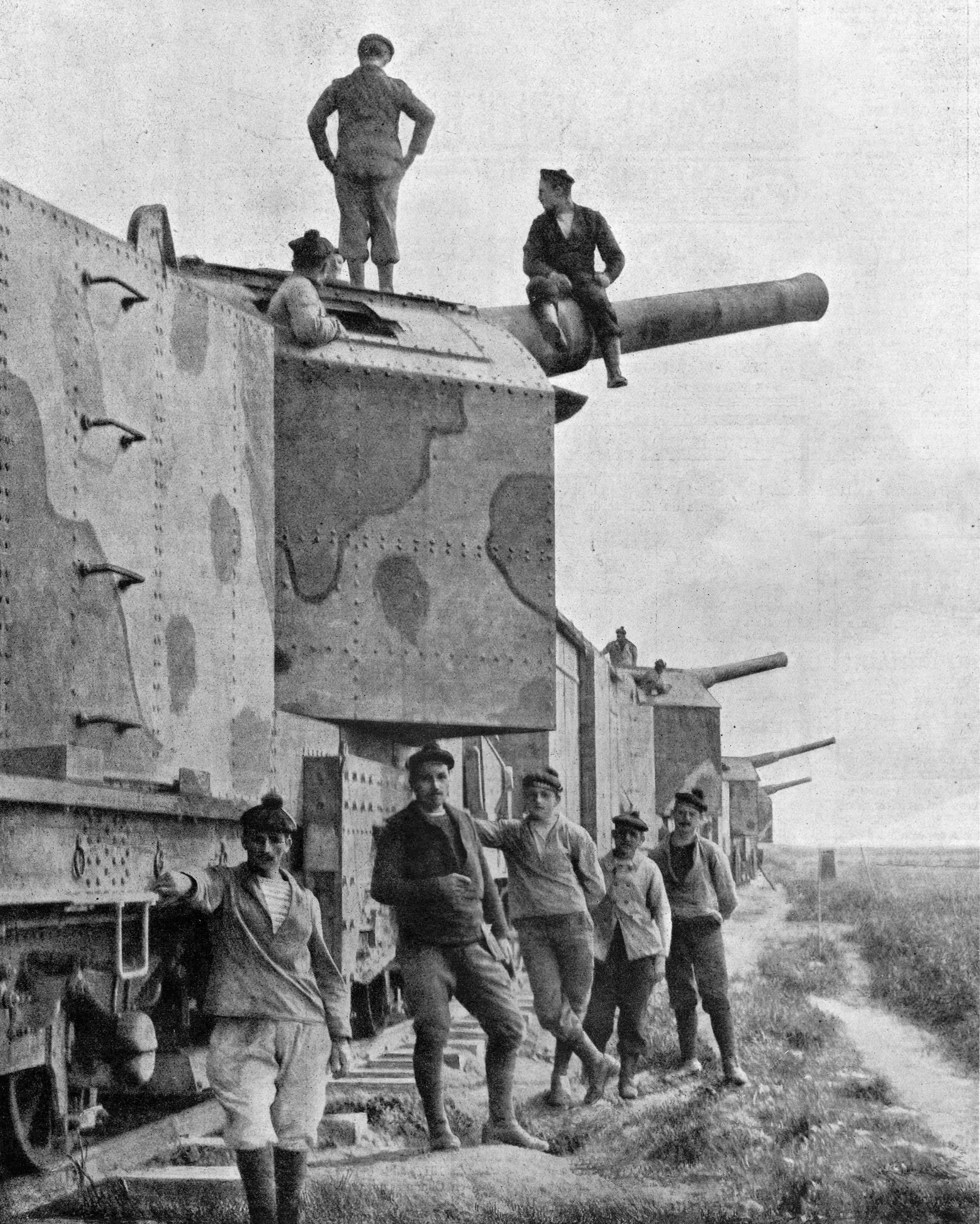

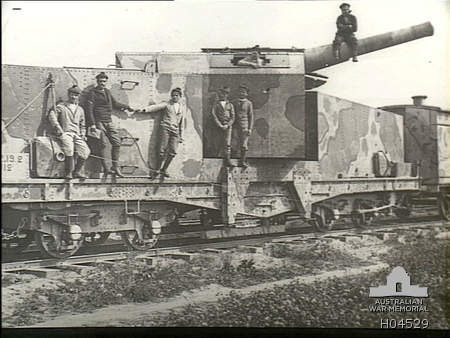

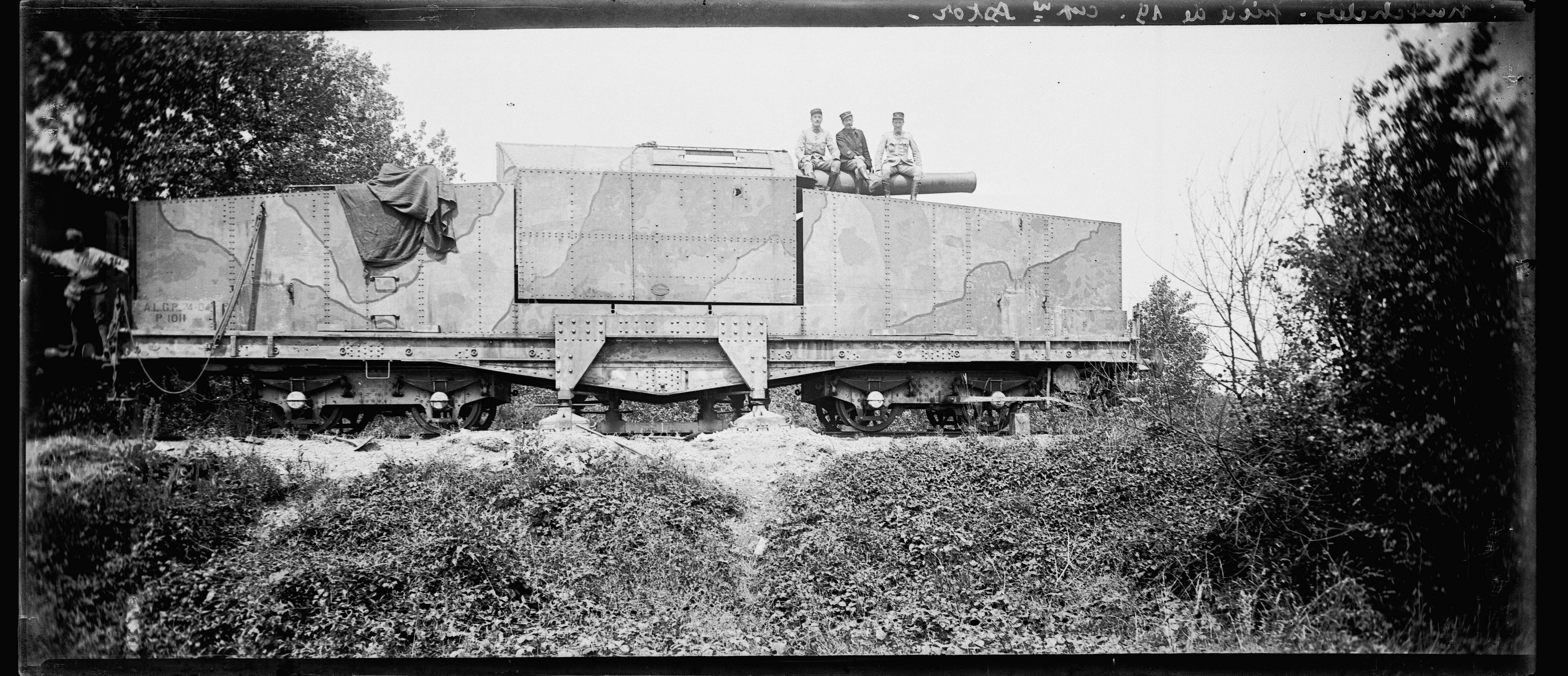

The positions of the 4th battery at Eze opposing the Italian advance on Menton.
