= Canon de 19 C modèle 1870/93 =

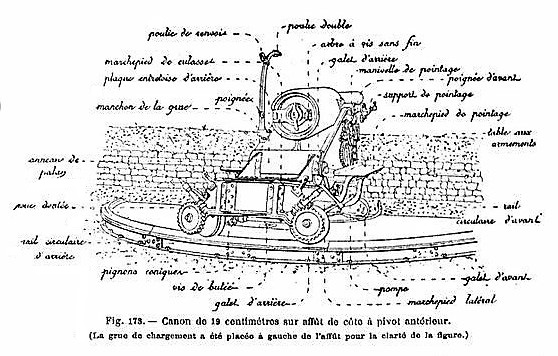
- Canon de 19 sur affut de cote.
- Type: Coastal artillery
- Place of origin: France

Service history
- In service: 1893–1945
- Used by: See § Users
- Wars: World War I World War II

Production history
- Variants: Railway gun

Specifications
- Mass: Complete: 26 t (26 long tons; 29 short tons); Carriage: 16 t (16 long tons; 18 short tons); Barrel: 10 t (9.8 long tons; 11 short tons)
- Barrel length: 5.8 m (19 ft) L/30
- Shell: Separate-loading, bagged charge and projectiles
- Shell weight: 85 kg (187 lb)
- Caliber: 194 mm (7.6 in)
- Breech: de Bange
- Recoil: Hydro-gravity
- Carriage: Center pivot
- Elevation: -6° to +30°
- Traverse: 360°
- Rate of fire: 1 round every two minutes
- Muzzle velocity: 640 m/s (2,100 ft/s)
- Maximum firing range: 18.3 km (11.4 mi)

The Canon de 19 C modèle 1870/93 was a French coastal defense gun designed and built before World War I that also saw action during World War II. A number of guns were also converted to railway guns during World War I in order to meet the need for heavy artillery and these were also used in World War II.

== Design ==
The Canon de 19 C modèle 1870/93 were typical built-up guns of the period with mixed construction consisting of a rifled steel liner and several layers of iron reinforcing hoops. In French service guns of mixed steel/iron construction were designated in centimeters while all steel guns were designated in millimeters. However, reference materials don't always distinguish the difference in construction and use either unit of measurement. The guns used a de Bange breech and fired separate loading bagged charges and projectiles.

The mle 1870/93 was mounted on a mle 1886 center pivot mount with a rectangular steel firing platform which sat on top of a large diameter geared steel ring set into a concrete slab behind a parapet with the barrel of the gun overhanging the parapet at the front and an overhanging loading platform to the rear. The mounts allowed high angles of elevation +30° with 360° of traverse. The mount was traversed by a worm gear which attached to the base.

The recoil system for the mle 1870/93 consisted of a U-shaped gun cradle which held the trunnioned barrel and a slightly inclined firing platform with a hydro-gravity recoil system. When the gun fired the hydraulic buffer slowed the recoil of the cradle which slid up a set of inclined rails on the firing platform and then returned to position by the combined action of the buffers and gravity.

== Railway guns ==
=== World War I ===
Twenty-six mle 1893-1896 guns were converted to Canon de 19 modèle 1870/93 TAZ railway guns during the first world war. The guns were mounted in a large turret on an armored railroad carriage built by Schneider.

=== World War II ===
Twenty-four mle 1870/93 TAZ railway guns were mobilized at the beginning of the second world war. After the fall of France, nine guns were used by the Germans as coastal defense artillery under the designation 19 cm K(E) 486(f). The Kingdom of Italy also received twelve guns after the Armistice of Villa Incisa and these were given the designation Cannone da 194/29 Modello 70/93. They were integrated into armored trains of the Royal Italian Army and assigned coastal defense duties. Their only action was 13 March 1944 with the Italian Co-belligerent Army during the Battle of Montelungo.

== Users ==
- France
- Nazi Germany
- Kingdom of Italy

== Gallery ==
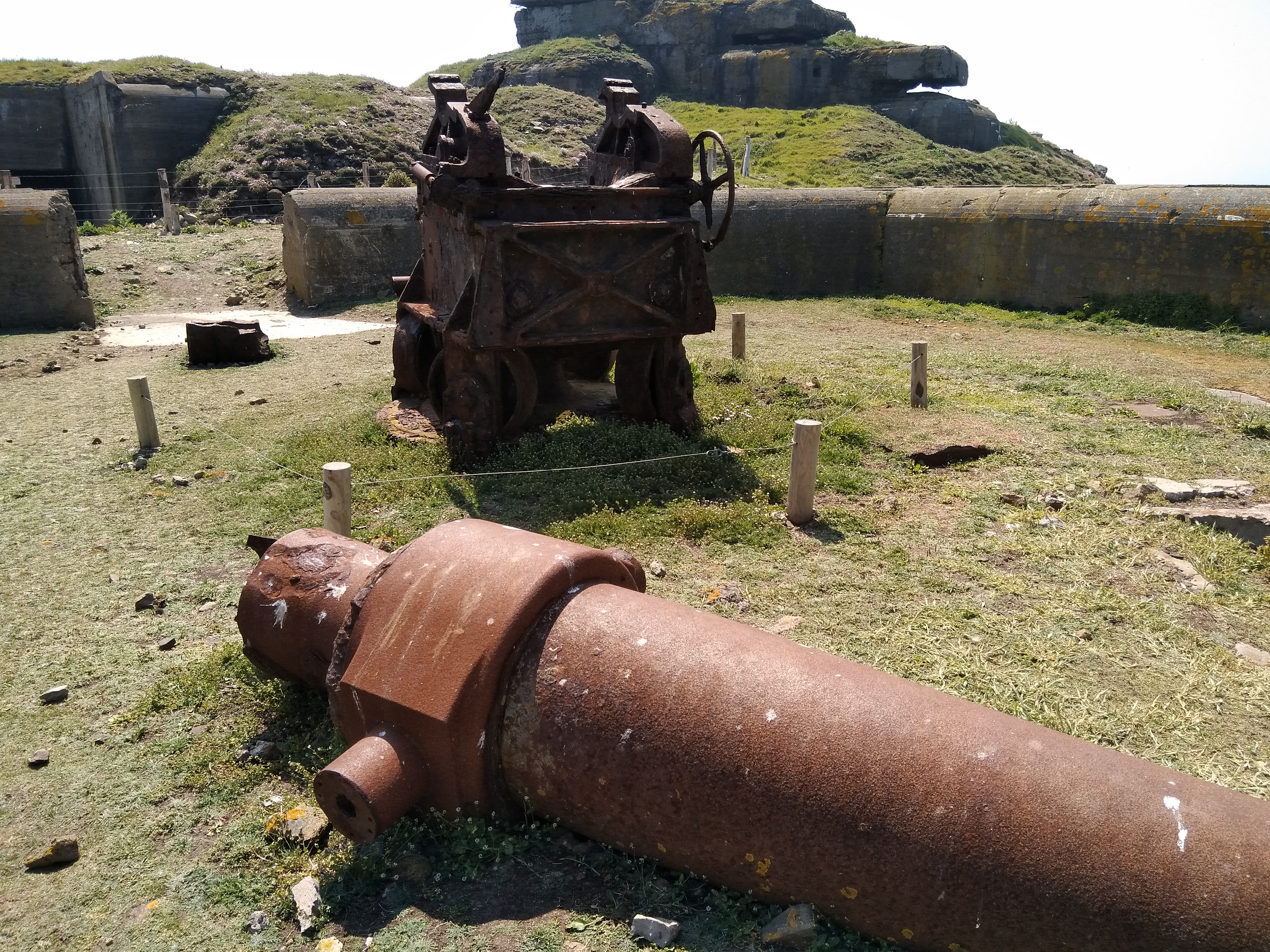
The remains of one of six 194 mm guns on the island of Cézembre (France), destroyed by Allied bombing in August 1944.

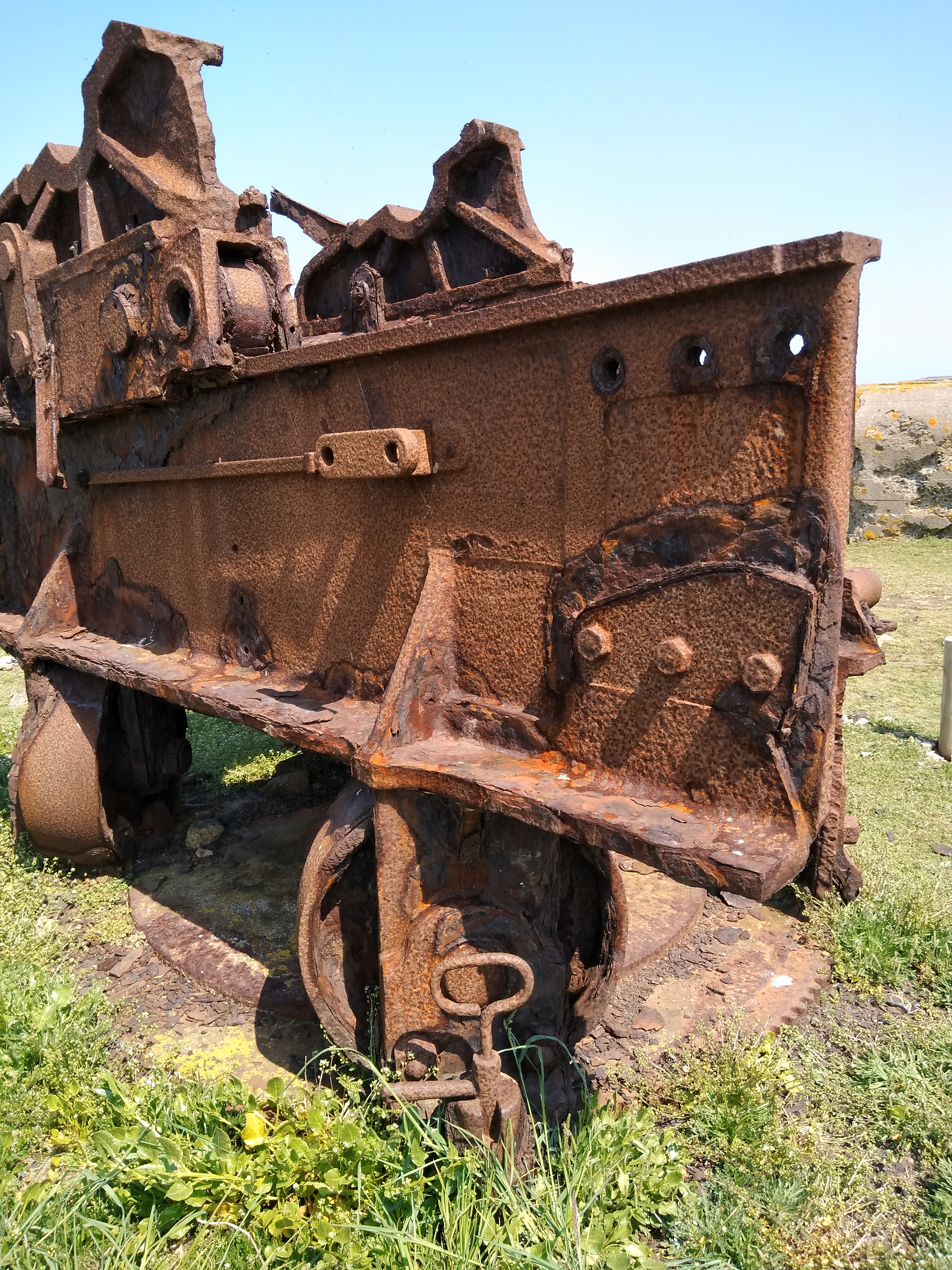

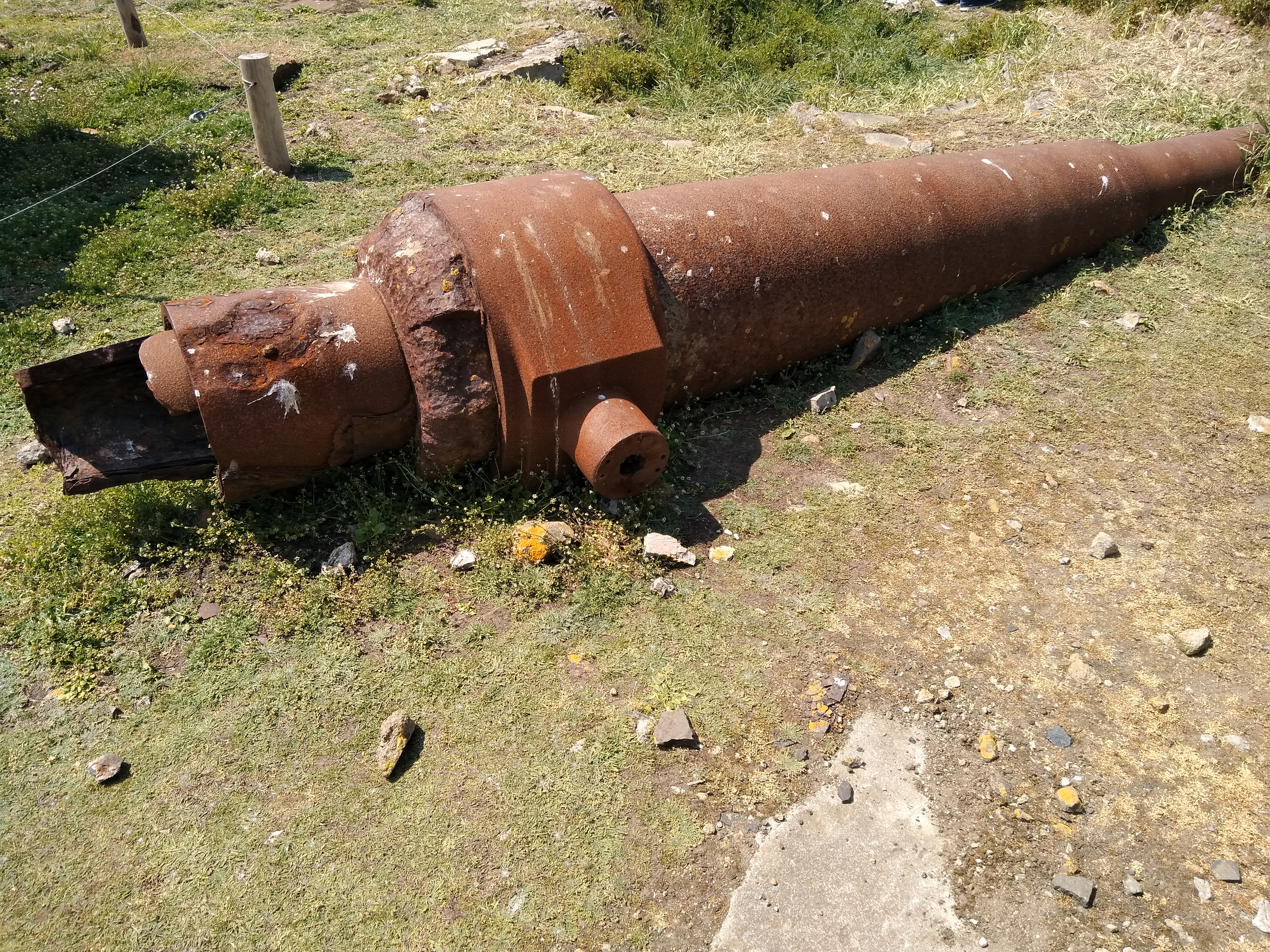

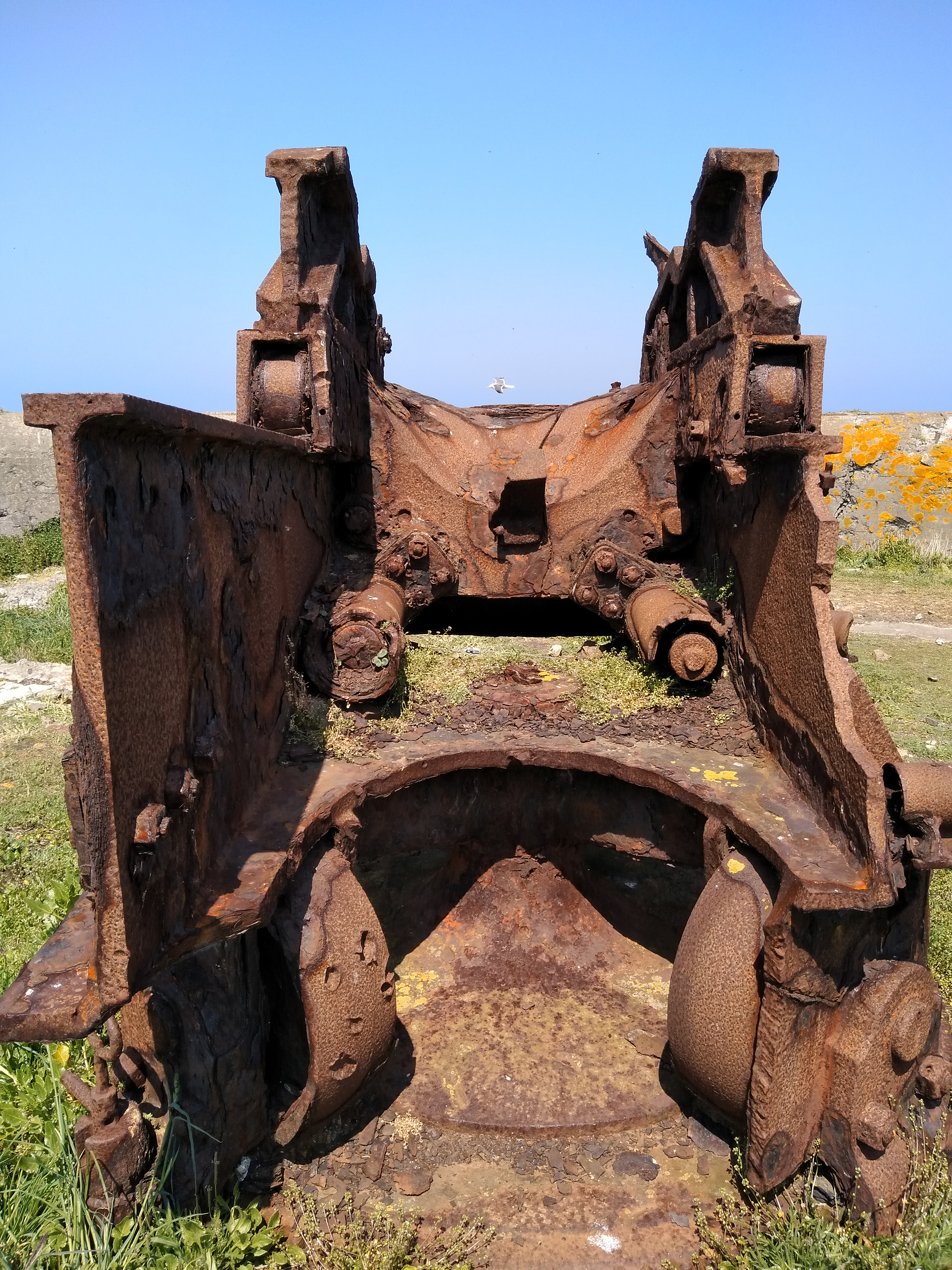
