= Domenico De Masi =

Italian sociologist (1938–2023)

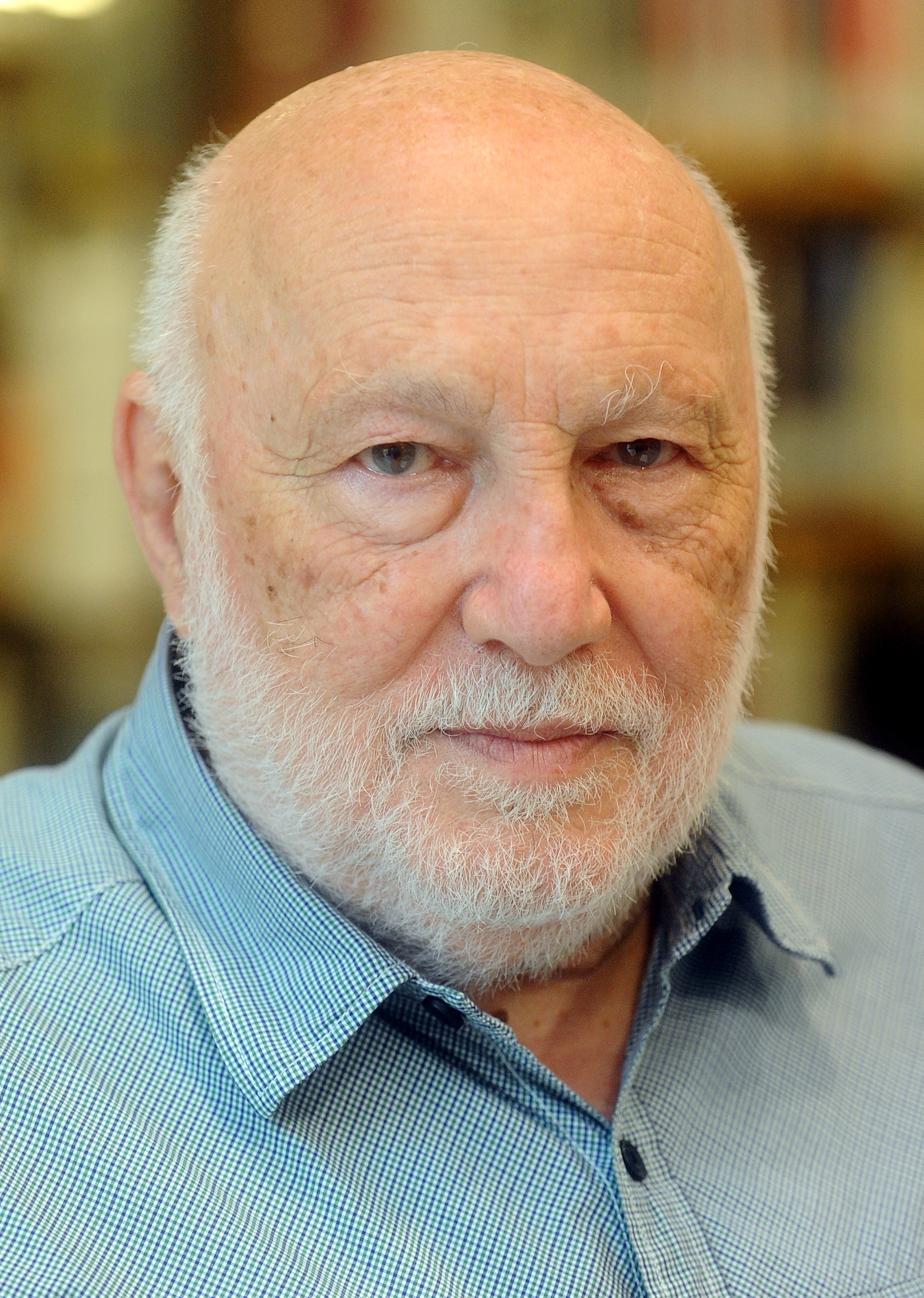
- De Masi in 2018
- Born: 14 February 1938; Rotello, Italy
- Died: 9 September 2023 (aged 85); Rome, Italy
- Education: University of Perugia
- Occupation: Sociology
- Employer(s): University of Naples Federico II; University of Sassari; University of Naples "L'Orientale"; Sapienza University of Rome
- Website: www.domenicodemasi.it

Domenico De Masi (1 February 1938 – 9 September 2023) was an Italian sociologist. He was professor emeritus of sociology of work at the Università degli Studi di Roma "La Sapienza", where he also was head of the Faculty of Communication Sciences.

As a scholar, teacher, researcher and consultant his interest was in the sociology of work and organisations, post-industrial society, development and underdevelopment, urban systems, creativity, free time, methods and techniques of social research with particular regard to forecasting investigations.

== Life ==
De Masi was born in Rotello, in 1938. He attended the liceo classico secondary school at Caserta and then moved to Perugia for his university studies, where he graduated in Law in 1960 with a thesis on the history of law. He specialised in sociology of work in Paris.

In Naples, he began his university career as an assistant in sociology at the Federico II University. At the same time, he was also a researcher at the 'Nord e Sud' study centre directed by Giuseppe Galasso, where he carried out research on informal groups and trade unions at the Italsider plant in Bagnoli (Naples). During this period, he also collaborated with the magazine 'Nord e Sud' directed by Francesco Compagna.

De Masi moved to Milan, where he worked until 1966 for the CMF company of the IRI-Finsider group, taking care of selection and training and coordinating the delivery of two new plants in Dalmine and Livorno. For this, CMF won the European Community award for the best organisational operation of the year. In Milan, he collaborated in the founding of the Associazione Italiana Formatori (AIF), of which he later became president. and directed the magazine “FOR”.

In 1966 he moved to Rome to work as a lecturer and consultant in the Sociology of Labour at IFAP, the Iri Centre for the Study of Corporate Management Functions, chaired first by Giuseppe Glisenti, then by Pasquale Saraceno. From 1966 to 1979 he was lecturer in Industrial Sociology and then manager at IFAP.

From 1961 he taught: initially as an assistant professor of general sociology at the University of Naples Federico II, then (1968) as a professor of labour sociology at the University of Sassari, then as a professor of general sociology from 1971 to 1973 at the University of Naples "L'Orientale", from 1974 to 1977 as a professor of Social Research Methods and Techniques again at Federico II and finally, from 1977, at "La Sapienza" in Rome, where he had held various posts, including President of the Faculty of Communication Sciences.

From 1978 to 2000, he founded and directed the S3.Studium, a three-year postgraduate specialisation school in organisational sciences, to make up for the shortage of university master's degrees. The school, a non-profit organisation, trains postgraduates and participates in the debate on the sociology of work and related organisations in Italy through seminars, conferences, meetings, exhibitions, magazines and collective books.

When, in 2000, university regulations instituted university master's degrees, he organised the 'Master's degree in Communication and Organisation' at the Faculty of Communication Sciences, of which he was president. He was assisted in this endeavour by former student Calogero Catania. In that year, S3.Studium turned into a consultancy, research, communication, publishing and training company, focusing mainly on the managerial world.

In 1989, with sociologists Delia Zingarelli and Giovanna Scarpitti, he established the S3Acta SrL consulting firm.

Since 1998 S3.Studium has published the magazine Next Strumenti per l’innovazione, conceived and directed by the sociologist and illustrated by Franco Maria Ricci. Alongside the magazine, S3 has also published a series of studies and research with the publisher Guerini.

In 1995 he founded, and then became president of, SIT, Società Italiana Telelavoro, which for ten years dealt with the diffusion and regulation of unstructured work in Italy, associating the interested parties for this purpose (companies, unions, public and private managers ) in investigations and benchmarking on its adoption, its rejection and its advantages and disadvantages. Every year it organized a national teleworking day in which the general and associative situation was taken stock.

His works were popular and widespread in Brazil, with several of his works translated to Portuguese. In over thirty years, during which he received honorary citizenship of Rio de Janeiro, he was a consultant for Sebrae (Brazilian support service for small and medium-sized businesses), for the State of Santa Catarina and for TV Globo. He had carried out research on Brazilian culture on his own, for Sebrae on craftsmanship, for the State of Santa Catarina on fashion. These experiences produced the works Cara Brasileira (2002), O futuro da Moda de Santa Catarina (2008) and Caminhos da cultura no Brasil (2015).

De Masi also held conferences and seminars at official institutions (such as the Federal Senate and the Italian Embassy in Brasilia), universities (e.g., the Getúlio Vargas Foundation) and companies (FIAT in Belo Horizonte).

=== Civil and political work ===
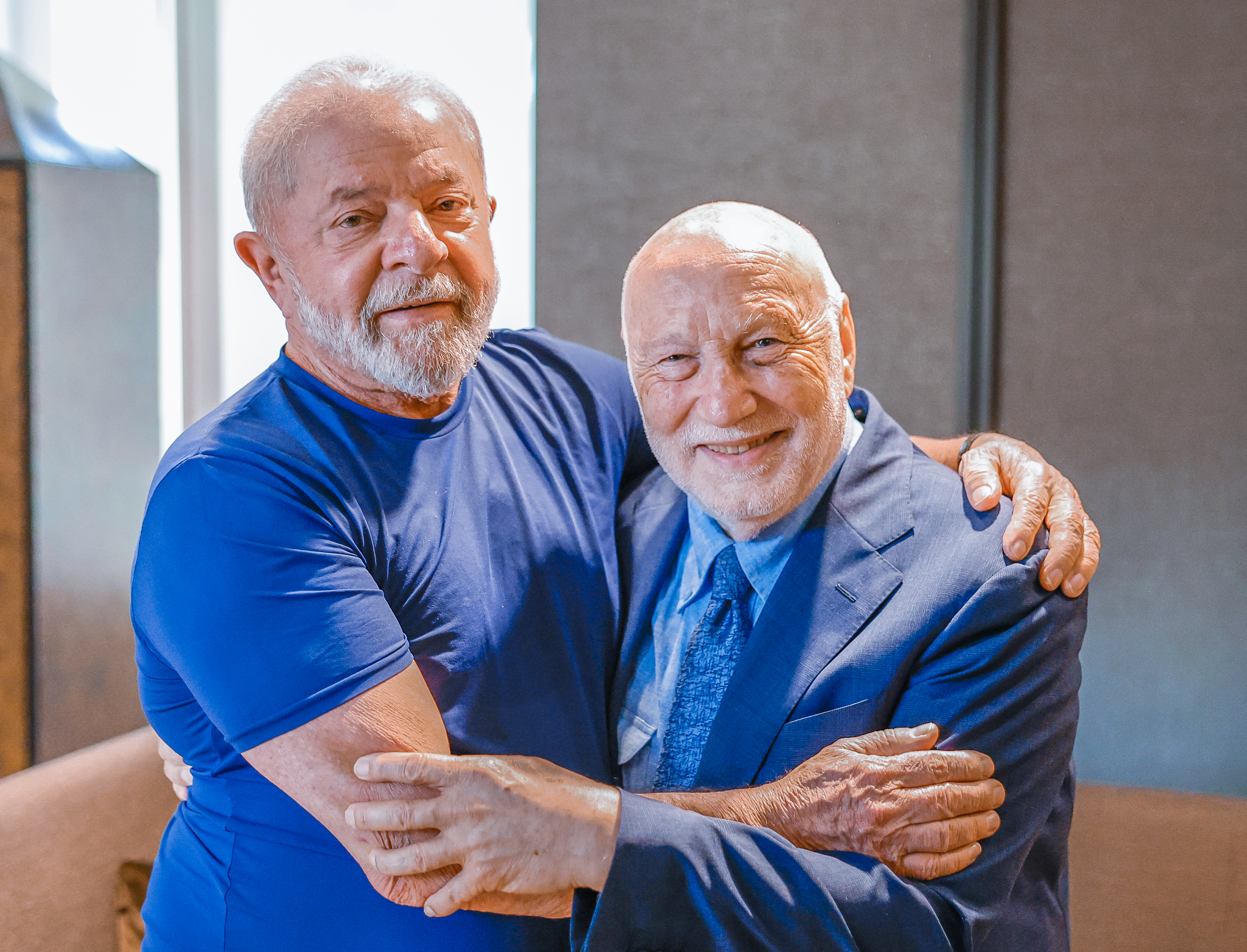
Lula da Silva and De Masi in 2023, some months before his death

Alongside his professional commitment to the university and S3.Studium, he undertook a number of non-profit initiatives:

- In 1974, he supervised the sociological part of the realisation of the Matteotti Village, designed by Giancarlo De Carlo, with the advice of Cesare de Seta, for the Terni company.
- He was president of the Istituto Nazionale di Architettura, and, for a brief time, of the Parco nazionale del Cilento, Vallo di Diano e Alburni.
- With Ermete Realacci and Alessandro Profumo he founded "Symbola", association of outstanding companies, of which he was a member of the scientific committee.

His legacies with his hometown are many: in Ravello he was an advisor for culture and tourism from 1994 to 1995, he founded and directed the International School of Cultural Management for the professionalisation of graduates in event organisation for four years, and from 2002 to 2010 he was president of the Ravello Foundation, relaunching the Ravello Festival and spending money on the construction of the Oscar Niemeyer Auditorium, whose project had been donated by the Brazilian architect of the same name.

== Paradigm ==
De Masi developed his own sociological paradigm from the thought of thinkers such as Tocqueville, Marx, Taylor, Bell, Gorz, Touraine, Heller, the Frankfurt School and landing on original content based on research centered mainly on the world of work.

De Masi contributed to developing and spreading the post-industrial paradigm, based on the idea that, starting from the mid-twentieth century, the joint action of technological progress, organizational development, globalisation, mass media and mass education has produced a new type of society centered on the production of information, services, symbols, values, and aesthetics.

This concept has determined new economic structures, new forms of work and free time, new values, new social subjects and new forms of coexistence.

His sociology analysed above all creative groups, creativity as a synthesis of fantasy and concreteness, creative idleness as a synthesis of work, study and play.

In the years since the COVID-19 pandemic, the call for the implementation of agile work has been heard repeatedly. During a conference held in Il Sole 24 Ore, he likened agile work to remote work, if job-related and goal-less, describing the system in a negative light.

== Personal life and death ==
His family moved to Sant'Agata de' Goti when De Masi was eight years old. He married twice, with two children from the first marriage.

Domenico De Masi died in Rome on 9 September 2023, at the age of 85.

== Publications ==
De Masi published several essays, alone or with collaborators:

- Sociologia urbana e dello sviluppo, tra cui La negazione urbana. Trasformazioni sociali e comportamento deviato a Napoli (con Gennaro Guadagno, Il Mulino, Bologna 1971); Napoli e la questione meridionale (2005).
- Sociologia del lavoro e dell'organizzazione, tra cui Sociologia dell'azienda (Il Mulino, Bologna 1973, a cura di); I lavoratori nell'industria italiana (4 voll., Franco Angeli, Milano 1974, a cura di, con Giuseppe Fevola); Trattato di sociologia del lavoro e dell'organizzazione (2 voll., Franco Angeli, Milano 1985-87, a cura di, con Angelo Bonzanini); Il lavoratore post-industriale. La condizione e l'azione dei lavoratori nell'industria italiana (Franco Angeli, Milano 1985); Sviluppo senza lavoro (Lavoro, Roma 1994); Il futuro del lavoro. Fatica e ozio nella società postindustriale (Rizzoli, Milano 1999 e 2007).
- Sociologia delle organizzazioni creative, tra cui L'emozione e la regola. I gruppi creativi in Europa dal 1850 al 1950 (Laterza, Bari-Roma 1990; Rizzoli, Milano 2005); L'ozio creativo (conversazione con Maria Serena Palieri, Ediesse, Roma 1995; Rizzoli, Milano 2000); La fantasia e la concretezza. Creatività individuale e di gruppo (Rizzoli, Milano 2003).
- Sociologia dei macro-sistemi, tra cui L'avvento post-industriale (1985); Non c'è progresso senza felicità (con Frei Betto, Rizzoli, Milano 2004); La felicità (con Oliviero Toscani, 2008); Mappa Mundi. Modelli di vita per una società senza orientamento (Rizzoli, Milano, 2014).
- Mappamundi. Modelli di vita per una società senza orientamento (Rizzoli, Milano 2015).
- L' emozione e la regola. L'organizzazione dei gruppi creativi del 2015
- Tag. Le parole del tempo (Rizzoli, Milano 2015).
- Napoli 2025. Come sarà la città tra dieci anni? del 2016
- Una semplice rivoluzione. Lavoro, ozio, creatività: nuove rotte per una società smarrita (Rizzoli, Milano 2016)
- Lavorare gratis, lavorare tutti. Perché il futuro è dei disoccupati (Rizzoli, Milano 2017)
- Lavoro 2025, il futuro dell'occupazione (e della disoccupazione) (Marsilio Editori, 2017)
- Il lavoro nel XXI secolo (Einaudi, Torino 2018).
- L'età dell'erranza. Il turismo nel prossimo decennio (Marsilio, Venezia 2018)
- Il mondo è giovane ancora (Rizzoli, 2018).
- Roma 2030 (Einaudi, 2019).
- Lo Stato necessario (Rizzoli, 2020)
- Smart working: La rivoluzione del lavoro intelligente (Marsilio, 2020)
