= Sant'Antonio da Padova, Santa Croce di Magliano =

Italian Roman Catholic church

Coordinates: 41°42′42″N 14°59′32″E

Sant'Antonio da Padova is a Roman Catholic church in the hill-town of Santa Croce di Magliano, in the Province of Campobasso, region of Molise, Italy.

== History ==
The church was first erected in 1632 and dedicated to St Anthony of Padua. The endowment for its construction was afforded by Don Pietro Giovanni Ceva Grimaldi, Brother of the Duke of Telese, and Baron of Santa Croce. After the earthquake of 1732, the church was rebuilt and enlarged. It had a single nave until 1850, when an additional nave was added on the left side. The church was restored in the 1990s. It putatively contains relics of San Flaviano.
