= San Martino in Pensilis railway station =

Railway station in Italy

San Martino in Pensilis
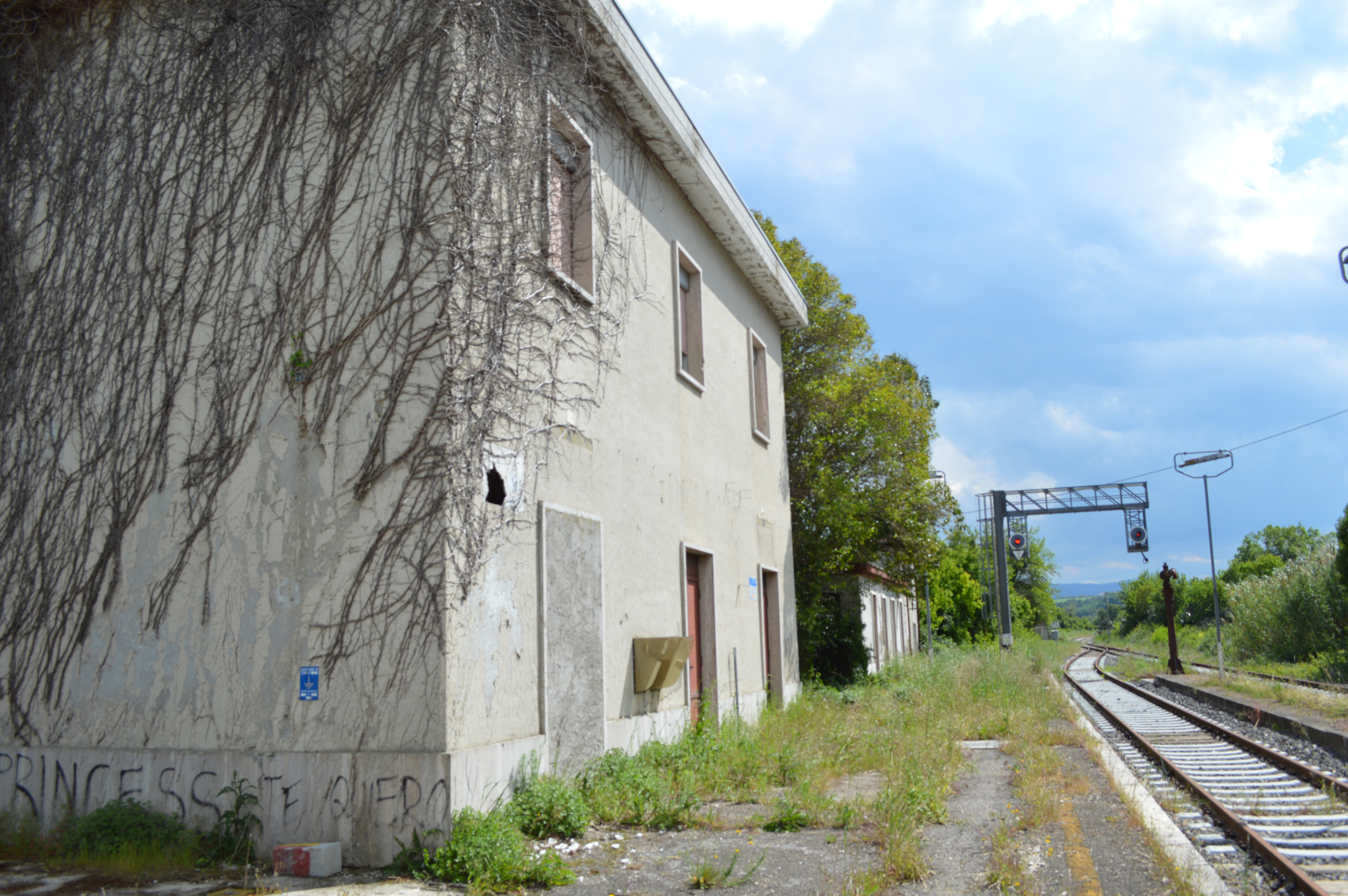
- San Martino in Pensilis stazione ferroviaria

General information
- Location: San Martino in Pensilis, Campobasso, Molise; Italy
- Coordinates: 41°52′37.92″N 14°59′03.84″E
- Operator: Rete Ferroviaria Italiana
- Lines: Termoli-Campobasso; Termoli–Venafro
- Platforms: 2
- Tracks: 2
- Train operators: Trenitalia

Other information
- Classification: Closed

History
- Opened: 1882
Location

San Martino in Pensilis railway station

The San Martino in Pensilis station is a railway station on the Termoli-Campobasso line.

Serve the town of San Martino in Pensilis.

The station is closed and in abandoned state.

== Bibliography ==
- Rete Ferroviaria Italiana. Fascicolo Linea 138
- Sviluppo delle ferrovie italiane dal 1839 al 31 dicembre 1926 (1927). FERROVIE DELLO STATO. UFFICIO CENTRALE DI STATISTICA (in Italian). Rome: Tipografia ditta Ludovico Cecchini.
- Rif.Legge Baccarini(L. 29 luglio 1879, n. 5002), Relazione statistica sulle costruzioni e sull'esercizio delle strade ferrate italiane per l'anno 1882 (1883). MINISTERO DEI LAVORI PUBBLICI. DIREZIONE GENERALE DELLE STRADE FERRATE (in Italian). Rome: Tipografia Eredi Botta, 1883. p. 116.
