= San Giacomo, Santa Croce di Magliano =

Roman Catholic church

Coordinates: 41.71078°N 14.99023°E

San Giacomo is a Roman Catholic church located on Corso Umberto I in the hill-town of Santa Croce di Magliano, in the Province of Campobasso, region of Molise, Italy.

== History ==
Construction of the church began in 1727 and it was dedicated to St James, likely St James the Greater, often invoked in regions threatened by Saracen raiders. In 1742, a cemetery was moved here from a site near an old church called the Cappelluccia. This cemetery was used after the plague of Cholera in 1837. The bell-tower was completed in 1875. The church structure was refurbished in the 1990s. Inside are processional statues of St James and of the Virgin Addolorata with Dead Christ. The 2002 earthquake toppled the spire of the bell-tower and caused significant structural damage.
