= Santa Croce di Magliano =

- Comune
- Comune di Santa Croce di Magliano
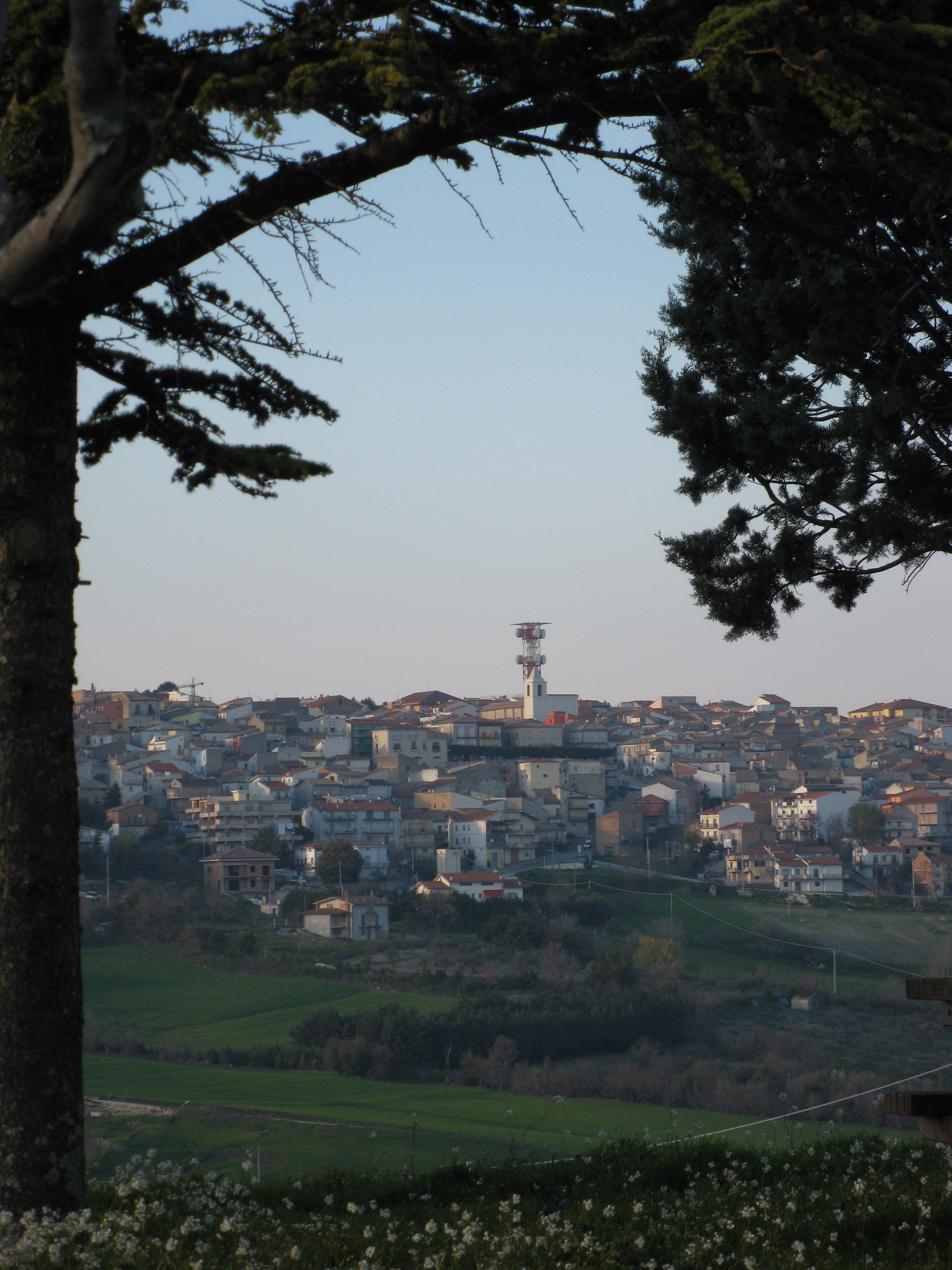
- View of Santa Croce di Magliano

- Location within Italy Location within Molise
- Coordinates: 41°43′N 14°59′E
- Country: Italy
- Region: Molise
- Province: Campobasso (CB)

Government
  - Mayor: Donato D'Ambrosio

Area
  - Total: 53.37 km^{2} (20.61 sq mi)
- Elevation: 608 m (1,995 ft)

Population (30 November 2017)
  - Total: 4,356
  - Density: 81.62/km^{2} (211.4/sq mi)
- Demonym: Santacrocesi
- Time zone: UTC+1 (CET)
  - Summer (DST): UTC+2 (CEST)
- Postal code: 86047
- Dialing code: 0874
- Website: Official website

Santa Croce di Magliano is a comune (municipality) in the Province of Campobasso in the Italian region Molise, located about 30 kilometres (19 mi) northeast of Campobasso. The settlement was formerly inhabited by an Arbëreshë community, who have since assimilated.

S. Croce di Magliano is on a hilltop approximately 608 metres (1,995 ft) above sea level, just north of the Fortore river. In the Middle Ages the Roman settlements gave rise to "casali", or rural hamlets, and in the Hohenstaufen period (13th century) Santa Croce is recorded as a fiefdom of the Stipide family. In 1266 it became a fiefdom of the Monastery of Sant'Eustachio.

Among the local churches are Sant'Antonio da Padova and San Giacomo.

Santa Croce di Magliano borders the following municipalities: Bonefro, Castelnuovo della Daunia, Montelongo, Rotello, San Giuliano di Puglia, Torremaggiore.

== Sports and recreation ==
The soccer team in Santa Croce di Magliano is called the Uninone Sportiva Turris. The team was founded in 1963.
