= San Martino in Pensilis =

- Comune
- Comune di San Martino in Pensilis
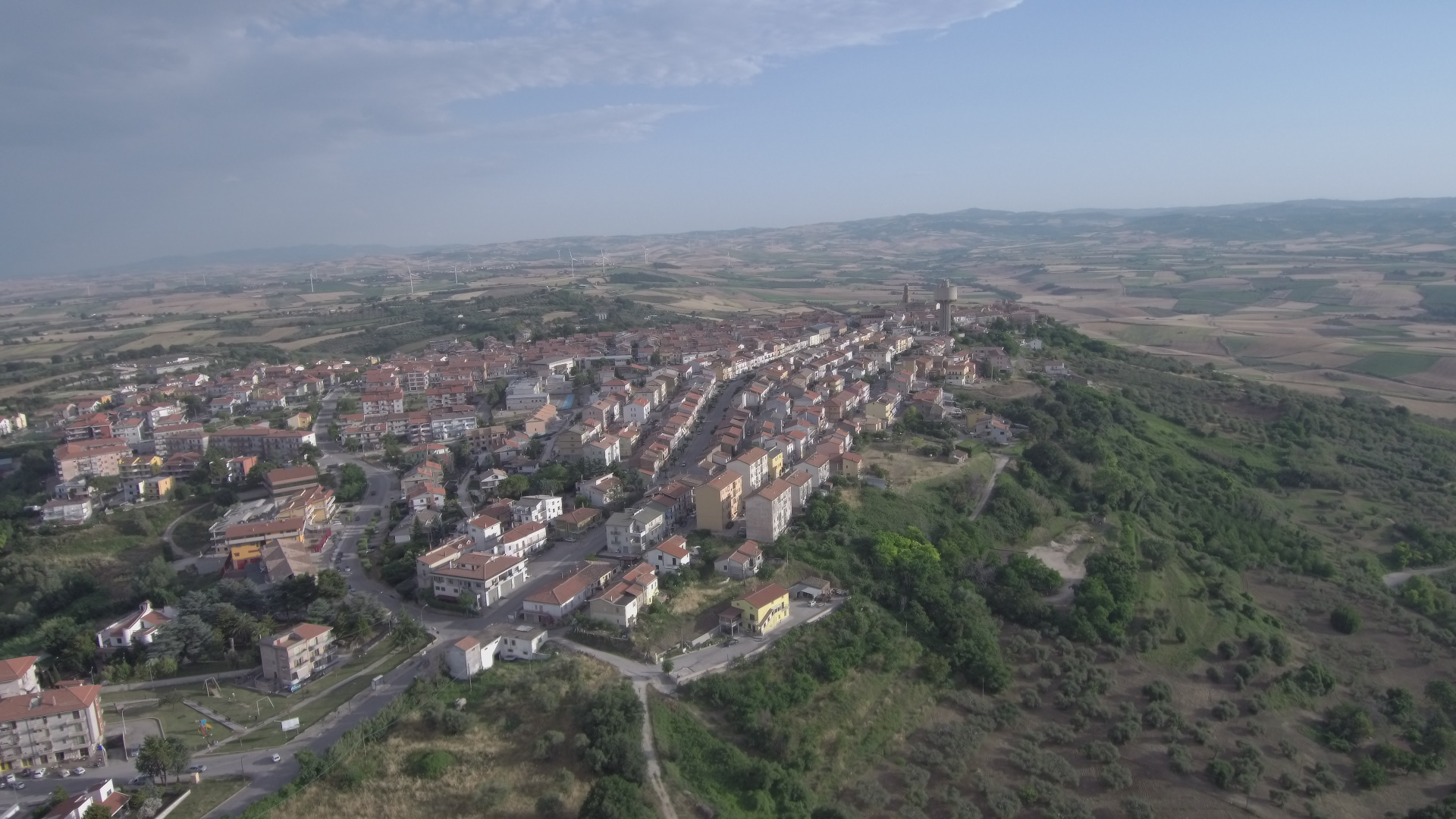
- View of San Martino in Pensilis

- Coat of arms

- Location within Italy Location within Molise
- Coordinates: 41°52′N 15°1′E
- Country: Italy
- Region: Molise
- Province: Campobasso (CB)

Government
  - Mayor: Massimo Caravatta

Area
  - Total: 100.3 km^{2} (38.7 sq mi)
- Elevation: 15 m (49 ft)

Population (30 November 2017)
  - Total: 4,754
  - Density: 47.40/km^{2} (122.8/sq mi)
- Demonym: Sammartinesi
- Time zone: UTC+1 (CET)
  - Summer (DST): UTC+2 (CEST)
- Postal code: 86046
- Dialing code: 0875
- Website: Official website

San Martino in Pensilis is a comune (municipality) in the Province of Campobasso in the Italian region Molise, located about 45 kilometres (28 mi) northeast of Campobasso.The settlement was formerly inhabited by an Arbëreshë community, who have since assimilated.

San Martino in Pensilis borders the following municipalities: Campomarino, Chieuti, Guglionesi, Larino, Portocannone, Rotello, Serracapriola, Ururi.

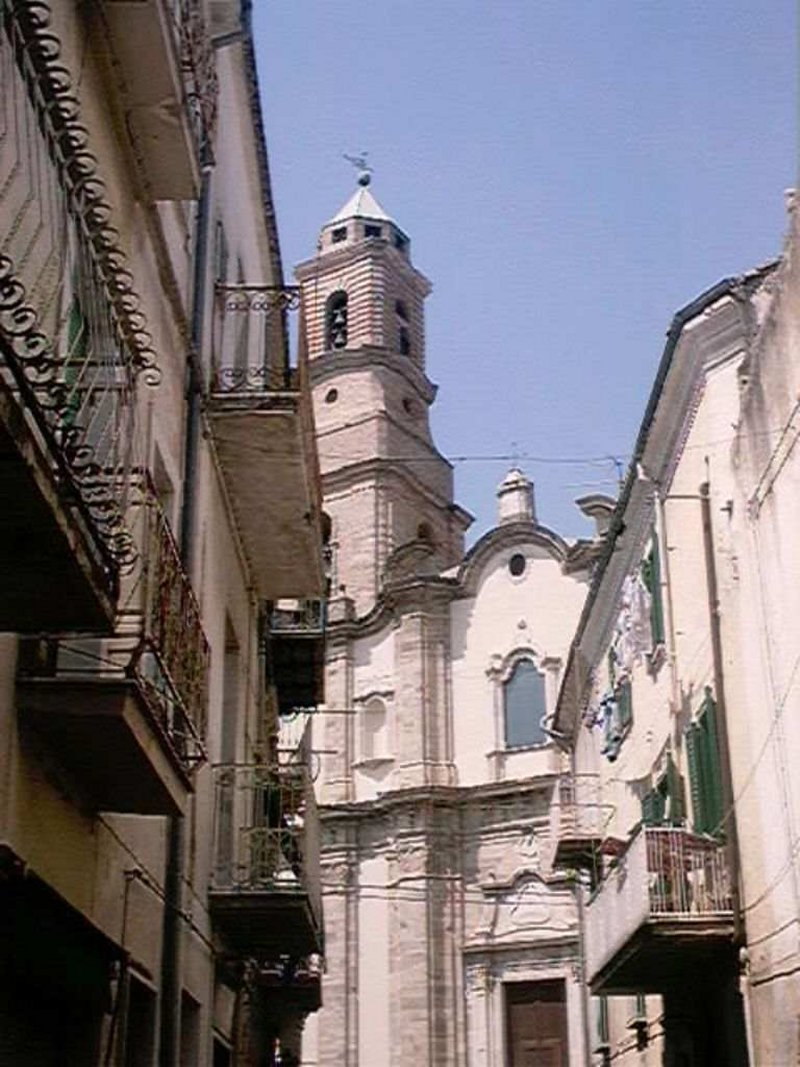
Church of St. Peter

== Transportation ==
San Martino in Pensilis has a railway station, the San Martino in Pensilis railway station, on the Termoli-Campobasso and Termoli Venafro line.

But the station has been closed for a few years and does not have passenger service.
