= Ururi–Rotello railway station =

Railway station in Ururi, Italy

Ururi–Rotello
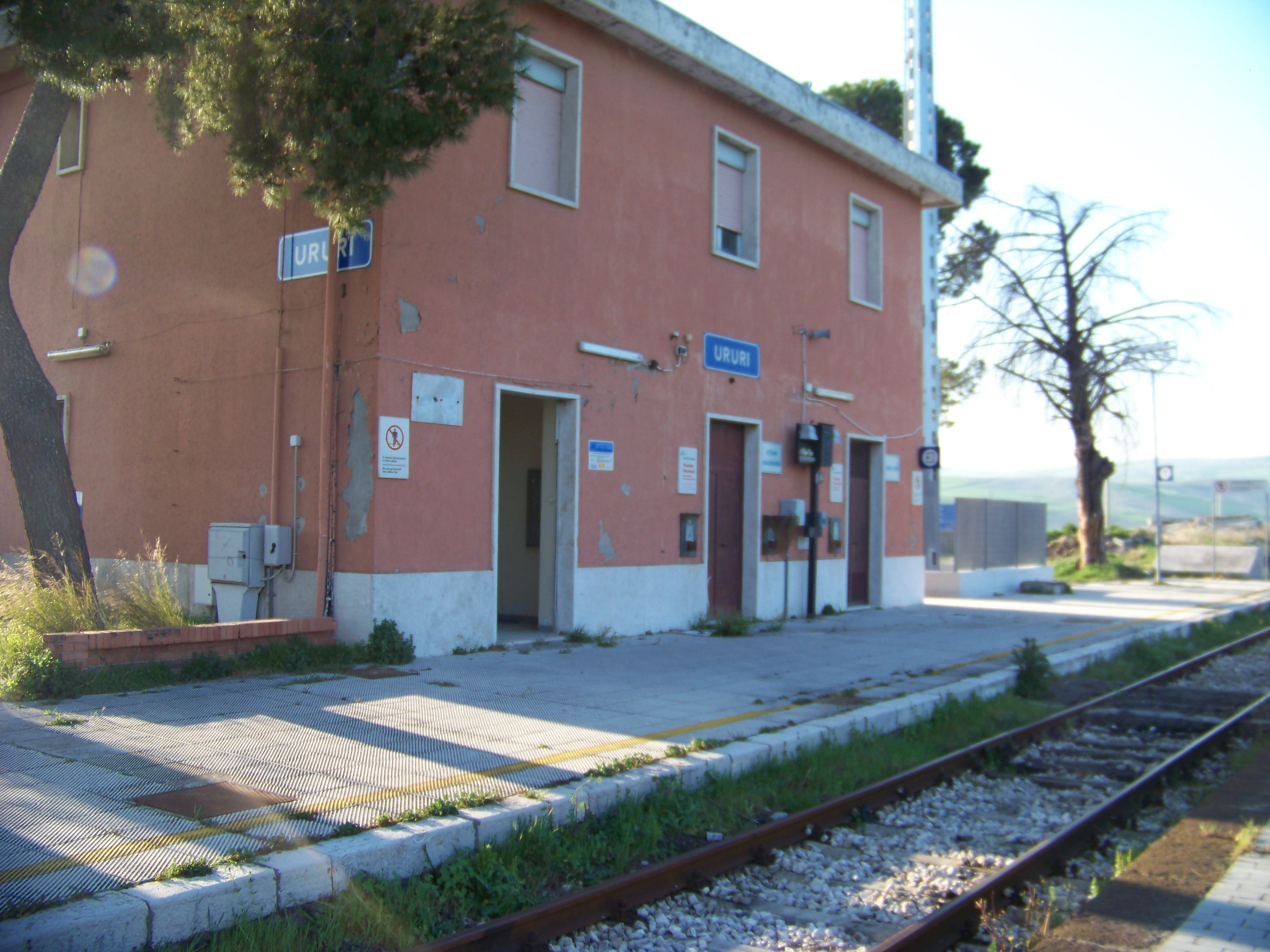

General information
- Location: Contrada Stazione; Ururi, Campobasso, Molise; Italy
- Coordinates: 41°48′04.22″N 14°57′11.93″E
- Operator: Rete Ferroviaria Italiana
- Lines: Termoli–Campobasso; Termoli–Venafro
- Platforms: 2
- Tracks: 2
- Train operators: Trenitalia

Other information
- Classification: Closed (for passenger service)

History
- Opened: 1882
Location

The Ururi–Rotello railway station is the railway station serving the municipalities of Ururi and Rotello in the province of Campobasso.

The station is closed for the passenger service.

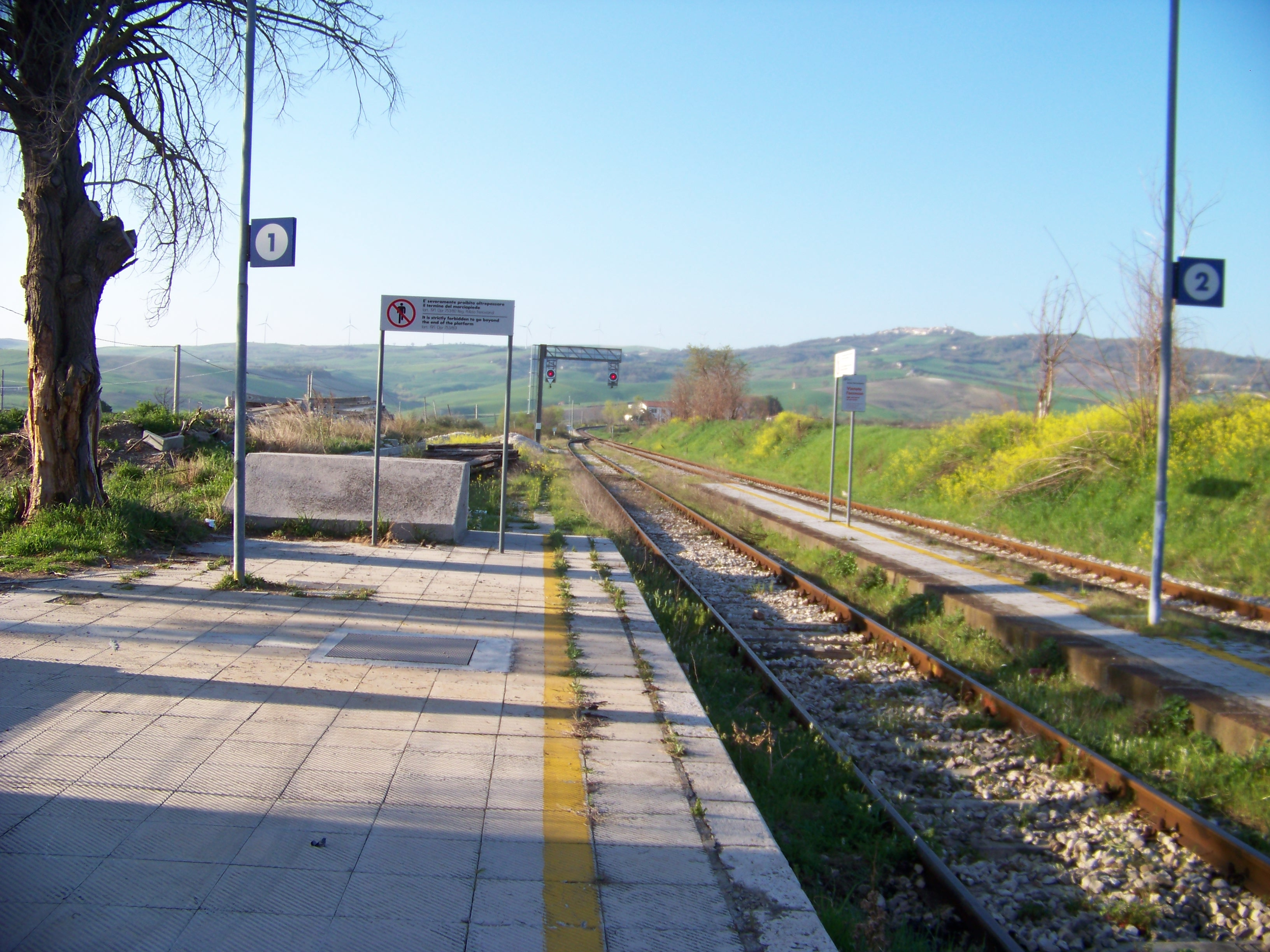
Stazione di Ururi–Rotello platforms

== Bibliography ==
- La strada ferrata Termoli-Campobasso(Ripalimosani : Arti grafiche La Regione, 1992) Codice identificativo bibliotecario nazionale italiano IT\ICCU\CFI\0251972
- Rete Ferroviaria Italiana. Fascicolo Linea 138
