= Canon de 164 modèle 1893/96 TAZ =

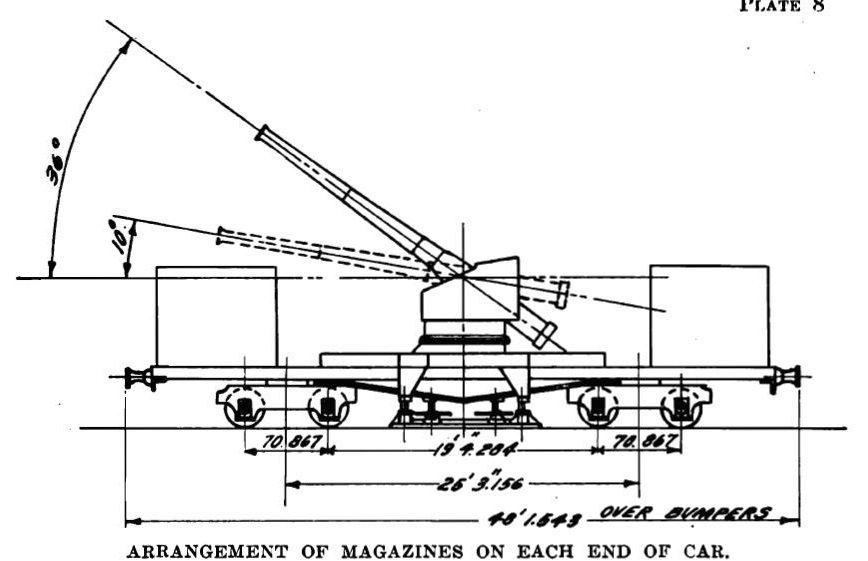
- Type: Railway gun
- Place of origin: France

Service history
- In service: 1914–1945
- Used by: France
- Wars: World War I World War II

Production history
- Designer: Schneider
- Designed: 1914
- Produced: 1915
- No. built: 8

Specifications
- Mass: 60 t (59 long tons; 66 short tons)
- Length: 14.7 m (48 ft)
- Barrel length: 7.4 m (24 ft) L/45
- Shell: Separate-loading, bagged charge and projectiles
- Shell weight: 45–55 kg (99–121 lb)
- Caliber: 164 mm (6.5 in)
- Breech: Interrupted screw
- Recoil: Top-carriage recoil
- Carriage: Top carriage traverse on 4-axle carriage
- Elevation: +10° to +40°
- Traverse: 360°
- Rate of fire: 3 rpm
- Muzzle velocity: 775–830 m/s (2,540–2,720 ft/s)
- Maximum firing range: 18 km (11 mi)

The Canon de 164 modèle 1893/96 TAZ was a railway gun designed and built early in the First World War. It also saw action during the Second World War.

== History ==
Although the majority of combatants had heavy field artillery prior to the outbreak of the First World War, none had adequate numbers of heavy guns in service, nor had they foreseen the growing importance of heavy artillery once the Western Front stagnated and trench warfare set in. Since aircraft of the period were not yet capable of carrying large diameter bombs the burden of delivering heavy firepower fell on the artillery. Two sources of heavy artillery suitable for conversion to field use were surplus coastal defense guns and naval guns.

However, a paradox faced artillery designers of the time; while large caliber naval guns were common, large caliber land weapons were not due to their weight, complexity, and lack of mobility. Large caliber field guns often required extensive site preparation because the guns had to be broken down into multiple loads light enough to be towed by a horse team or the few traction engines of the time and then reassembled before use. Building a new gun could address the problem of disassembling, transporting and reassembling a large gun, but it didn't necessarily address how to convert existing heavy weapons to make them more mobile. Rail transport proved to be the most practical solution because the problems of heavy weight, lack of mobility and reduced setup time were addressed.

== Design ==
The Canon de 164 modèle 1893/96 TAZ began life as eight Canon de 164 mm Modèle 1893 naval guns which were converted by Schneider to railroad guns during the First World War. They were typical built-up guns of the period with steel construction consisting of a rifled steel liner and several layers of steel reinforcing hoops. The guns used an interrupted screw breech and fired separate loading bagged charges and projectiles.

The first two guns were converted and delivered to the French Army in 1916, followed by two in 1917 and four more guns of a simplified design in 1918-19. The guns were mounted on a top carriage traverse mount with a gun shield in the middle of a 4-axle rail carriage. It also had a circular firing platform for the crew that had to be folded up for travel. There were ammunition storage casemates at both ends of the carriage and the armor was sufficient to provide protection from shell splinters and gunfire.

The mount was capable of 360° of traverse at elevations from +10° to +40° with a maximum range of 18 km (11 mi) and was often used for counter-battery fire. At lower elevations, the casemates at either end of the carriage interfered with traverse which limited the gun's firing arc to approximately 90° on each side. Carriages with this capability were known as Tous Azimuts or TAZ for short. The guns used a top-carriage recoil system where the gun sat on a cradle which held the trunnioned barrel. When fired a combination of hydraulic buffers and inclined rails on the firing platform returned the gun to position. Once in position, a section of rail bed was reinforced with wooden beams, the firing platform was unfolded and a combination of screw jacks, outriggers, and rail clamps stabilized the carriage during firing. It shared its railroad carriage with the Canon de 19 modèle 1870/93 TAZ.

== World War II ==
Eight of these railroad guns remained in French service after the end of World War I. Four were assigned to the 12th battery of the Heavy Artillery Regiment 374° of the ALVF (Artillerie Lourde sur Voie Ferrée) during the Second World War. At least four were captured by the Germans and given the designation 16 cm Kanone (E.) 454(f) although what use was made of them, if any, is unknown.

== Ammunition ==
Ammunition was of separate-loading, bagged charges and projectiles. There were two propellant charges and each weighed 20.7 kg (46 lb).

The gun was able to fire:

- Armor Piercing Capped 55 kg (121 lb)
- Common Incendiary 45 kg (99 lb)
- High-explosive 49.8 kg (110 lb)
- Semi-Armor Piercing 52.3 kg (115 lb)

== Photo Gallery ==
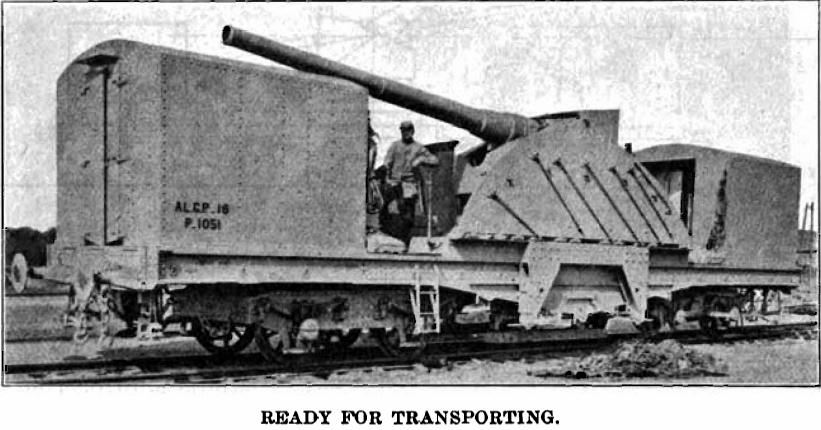
A Canon de 164 mle 1893/96 in traveling position.

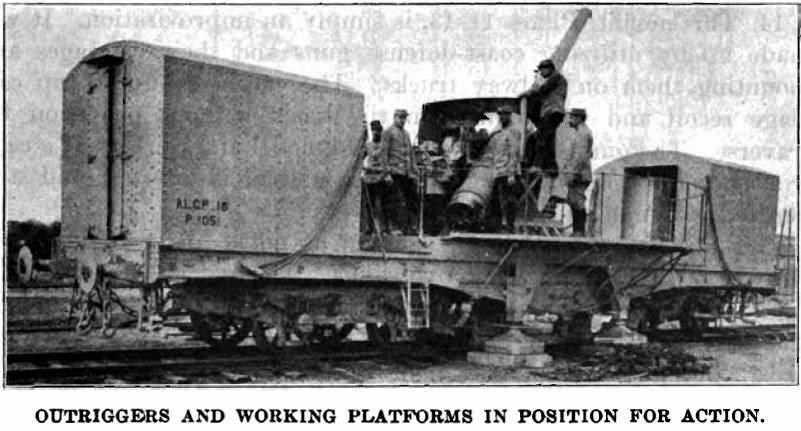
A Canon de 164 mle 1893/96 in firing position.

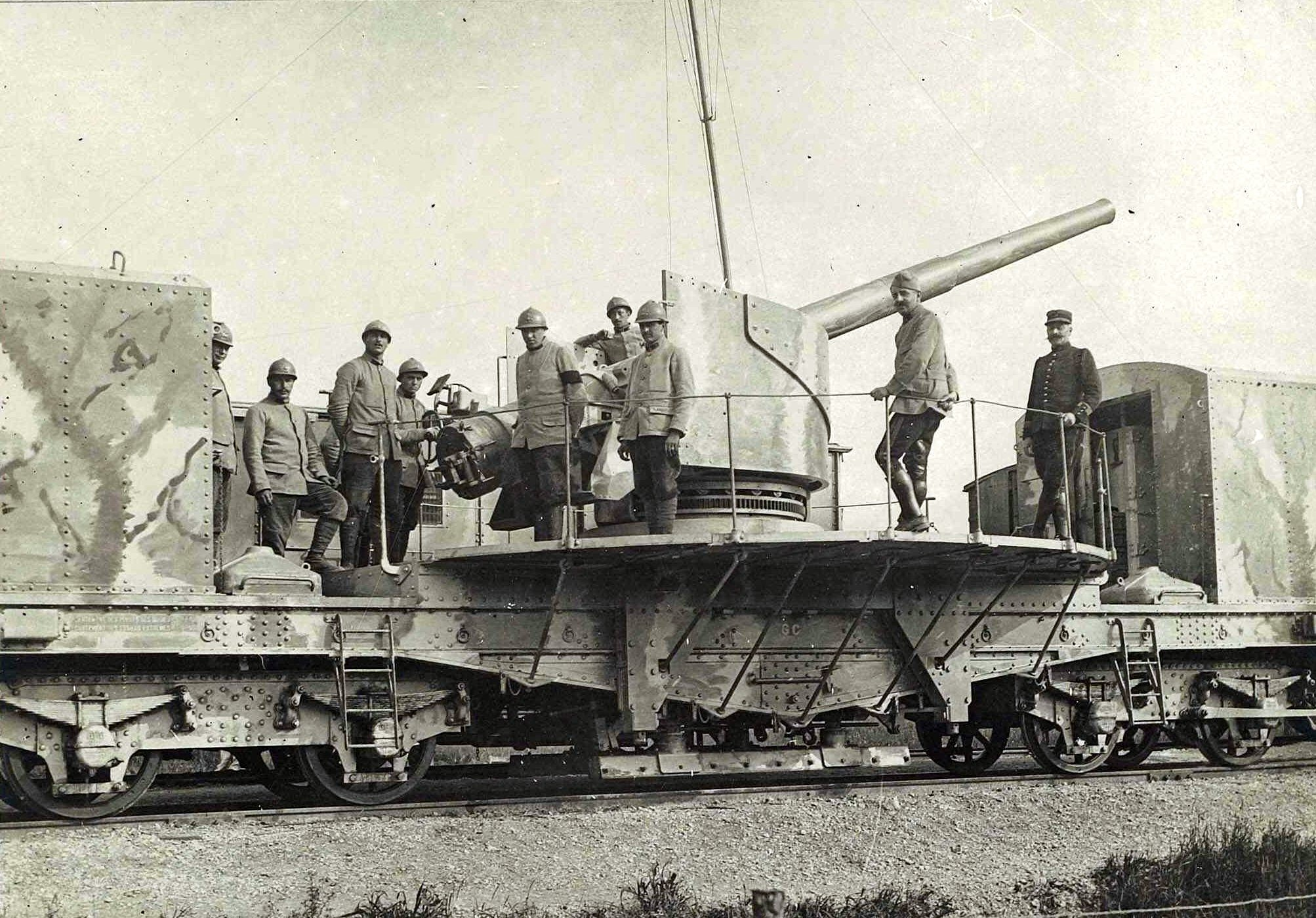
A Canon de 164 modèle 1893-96 TAZ near Sainte-Menehould in 1916.

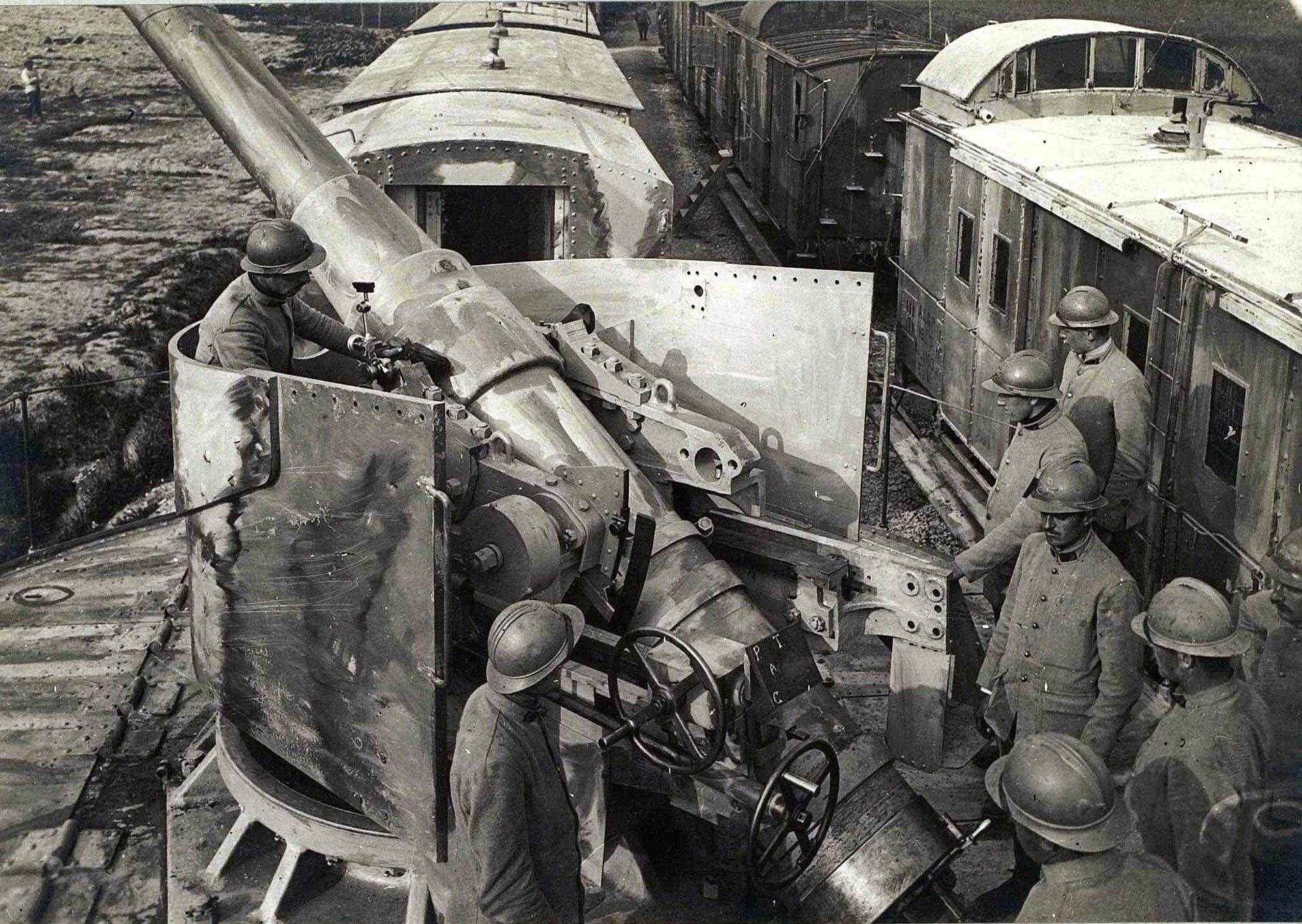
A Canon de 164 modèle 1893-96 TAZ near Sainte-Menehould in 1916.
