= Ururi =

Ururi Ruri
- Comune
- Comune di Ururi
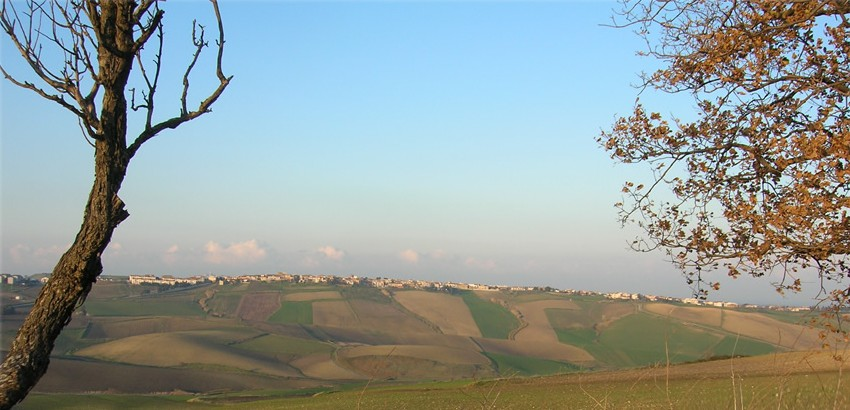
- Panorama of Ururi

- Coat of arms

- Location within Italy Location within Molise
- Coordinates: 41°49′N 15°1′E
- Country: Italy
- Region: Molise
- Province: Campobasso (CB)

Government
  - Mayor: Laura Greco

Area
  - Total: 31.5 km^{2} (12.2 sq mi)
- Elevation: 262 m (860 ft)

Population (31 December 2010)
  - Total: 2,779
  - Density: 88.2/km^{2} (228/sq mi)
- Demonym: Ururesi
- Time zone: UTC+1 (CET)
  - Summer (DST): UTC+2 (CEST)
- Postal code: 86049
- Dialing code: 0874
- Website: Official website

Ururi (Arbërisht: Rùri) is an Arbëreshë comune in the Province of Campobasso, in the Italian region Molise, located about 40 kilometres (25 mi) northeast of Campobasso. Ururi developed in the late 16th century settlement when Albanian military captain Teodoro Crescia gained a feud for the annual sum of 300 ducats in a depopulated area near Larino. Until 1583, it was repopulated with many Albanian families.

Ururi borders the following municipalities: Larino, Montorio nei Frentani, Rotello, San Martino in Pensilis.

== Transportation ==
Ururi is served by a railway station, the Ururi-Rotello railway station, on the Termoli-Campobasso and Termoli–Venafro line.

The station, however, has been closed for a few years and does not have passenger service.

== Bibliography ==
- Passarelli, Pasquale, ed. (1998). Molise; appendice: Testimonianze sui Sanniti. Istituto enciclopedico italiano.
