= Serracapriola =

- Comune
- Comune di Serracapriola
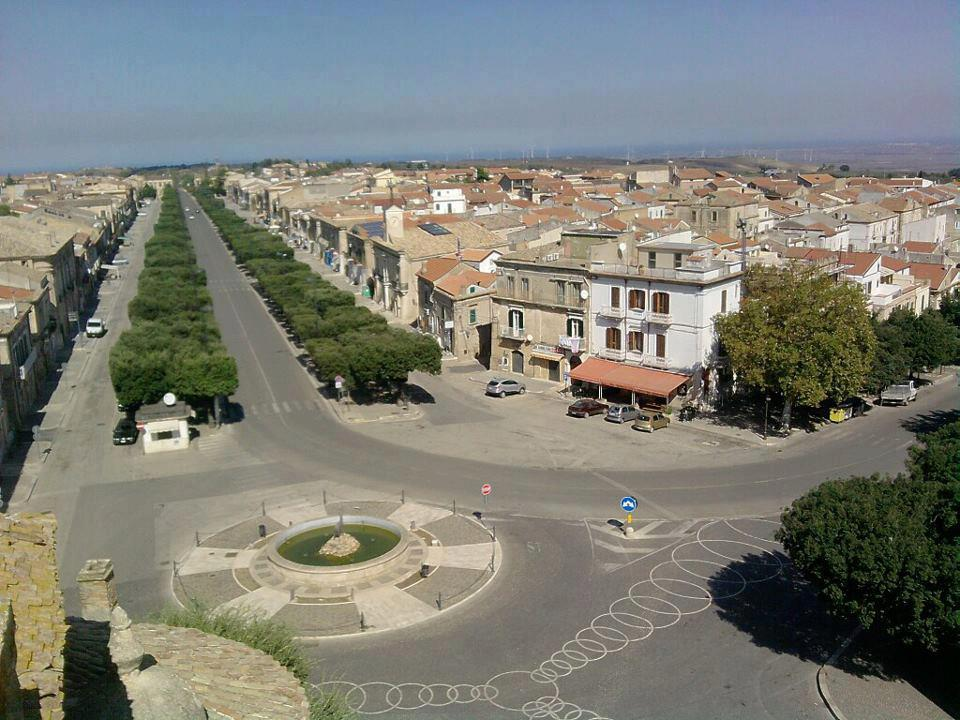
- View of Serracapriola

- Coat of arms

- Location within Italy Location within Apulia
- Coordinates: 41°48′N 15°10′E
- Country: Italy
- Region: Apulia
- Province: Foggia (FG)

Government
  - Mayor: Michele Leombruno (Lega)

Area
  - Total: 143.06 km^{2} (55.24 sq mi)
- Elevation: 270 m (890 ft)

Population (31 July 2013)
  - Total: 4,039
  - Density: 28.23/km^{2} (73.12/sq mi)
- Demonym: Serrani
- Time zone: UTC+1 (CET)
  - Summer (DST): UTC+2 (CEST)
- Postal code: 71010
- Dialing code: 0882
- Patron saint: Saint Mercurius
- Saint day: 5 September
- Website: Official website

Serracapriola (''Særræchæprióle'' or simply ''a Særre'' in the local apulo-molisana speech) is an Italian town of 4,039 inhabitants, located in the province of Foggia, Apulia. It is part of the Gargano National Park, and it is placed at the border between Apulia and Molise, on a hill 270 meters tall (about 885 feet).

The climate is Mediterranean, being placed few kilometers from the Adriatic Sea. In Serracapriola, the convent of the Padri Cappuccini is located, and it is one of the oldest in Puglia. Here, in 1905 San Pio da Pietrelcina began its teologic studies. It is possible to visit his lodging within the convent. At same place, it is possible to see the paint of the Madonna of Graces (namely “Madonna delle Grazie”).

== Geography ==
The town is bordered by Chieuti, Lesina, Rotello, San Martino in Pensilis, San Paolo di Civitate and Torremaggiore.
