= Rotello =

- Comune
- Comune di Rotello
- Location within Italy Location within Molise
- Coordinates: 41°45′N 14°57′E
- Country: Italy
- Region: Molise
- Province: Campobasso (CB)

Government
  - Mayor: Michele Perrotta

Area
  - Total: 70.0 km^{2} (27.0 sq mi)
- Elevation: 360 m (1,180 ft)

Population (30 November 2017)
  - Total: 1,190
  - Density: 17.0/km^{2} (44.0/sq mi)
- Demonym: Rotellesi
- Time zone: UTC+1 (CET)
  - Summer (DST): UTC+2 (CEST)
- Postal code: 86040
- Dialing code: 0874
- Website: Official website

Rotello is a comune (municipality) in the Province of Campobasso in the Italian region Molise, located about 30 kilometres (19 mi) northeast of Campobasso.

Rotello borders the following municipalities: Montelongo, Montorio nei Frentani, San Martino in Pensilis, Santa Croce di Magliano, Serracapriola, Torremaggiore, and Ururi.

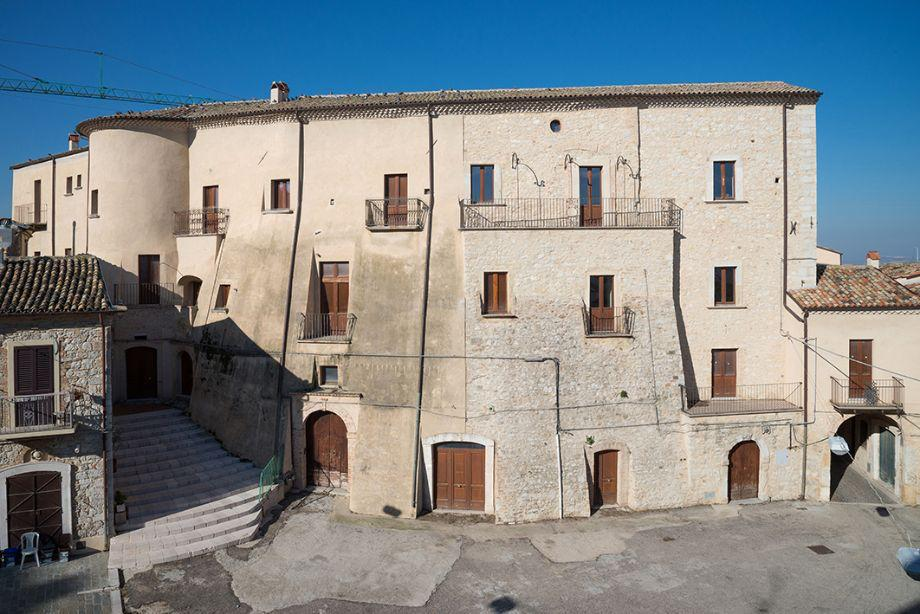

== Transportation ==
Rotello was served by a railway station, the Ururi-Rotello railway station, on the Termoli-Campobasso and Termoli–Venafro lines. However, the station has been closed for a few years and currently does not have passenger service.
