= Montelongo =

- Comune
- Comune di Montelongo
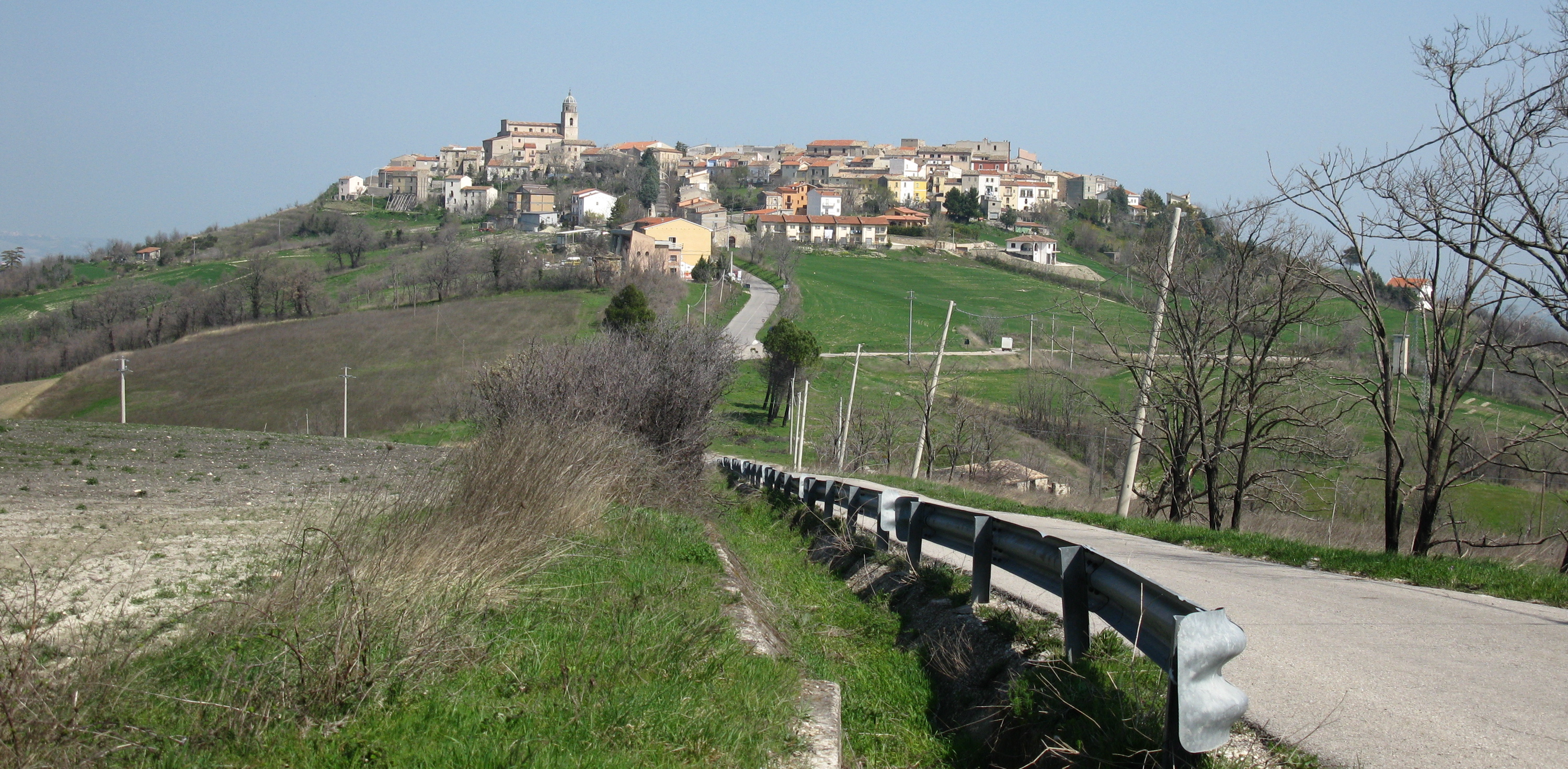
- Panorama of Montelongo

- Location within Italy Location within Molise
- Coordinates: 41°44′N 14°57′E
- Country: Italy
- Region: Molise
- Province: Campobasso (CB)

Government
  - Mayor: Nicolino Macchiagodena

Area
  - Total: 12.7 km^{2} (4.9 sq mi)
- Elevation: 592 m (1,942 ft)

Population (30 November 2017)
  - Total: 357
  - Density: 28.1/km^{2} (72.8/sq mi)
- Demonym: Montelonghesi
- Time zone: UTC+1 (CET)
  - Summer (DST): UTC+2 (CEST)
- Postal code: 86040
- Dialing code: 0874
- Website: Official website

Montelongo is a comune (municipality) in the Province of Campobasso in the Italian region Molise, located about 30 kilometres (19 mi) northeast of Campobasso.

Montelongo borders the following municipalities: Bonefro, Montorio nei Frentani, Rotello, Santa Croce di Magliano.

== See also ==
- Molise Croats
