= Mortier de 270 mm modèle 1885 =

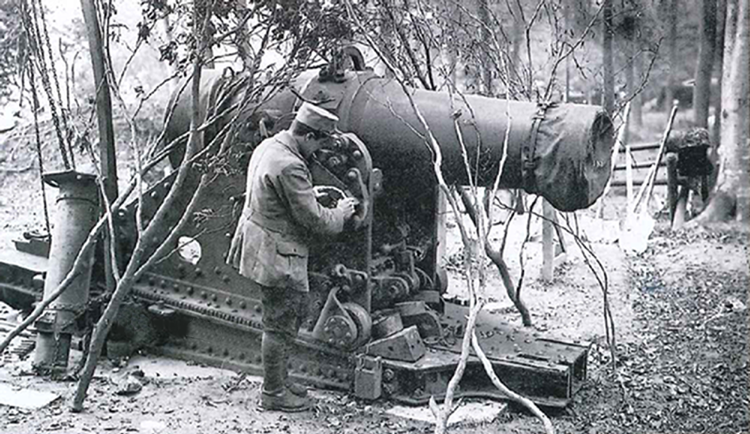
- Type: Heavy mortar Siege artillery
- Place of origin: France

Service history
- Used by: France
- Wars: World War I

Production history
- Designer: Charles Ragon de Bange
- Designed: 1885
- Produced: 1885
- No. built: 32

Specifications
- Mass: 16.5 t (16 long tons)
- Barrel length: 3.35 m (11 ft) L/12
- Shell: Separate loading bagged charges and projectiles
- Shell weight: 180–230 kg (400–510 lb)
- Caliber: 270 mm (11 in)
- Breech: de Bange
- Recoil: Hydraulic recoil mechanism
- Elevation: 0° to +70°
- Traverse: 30°
- Rate of fire: 1 shot every three minutes
- Muzzle velocity: 155–355 m/s (510–1,160 ft/s)
- Maximum firing range: 8 km (5 mi)

The Mortier de 270 mm modèle 1885 was a French heavy mortar employed as siege artillery during the First World War.

== History ==
The Mortier de 270 mm G mle 1885 was one of a series of heavy artillery pieces designed by Colonel Charles Ragon de Bange. On 11 May 1874 three de Bange heavy cannons (120 mm, 155 mm, 240 mm) and two mortars (220 mm, 270 mm) were ordered by the French Army.

The mle 1885 was advanced for its time due to being built completely of steel instead of a steel liner and cast iron reinforcing hoops of the previous Canon de 240 mm C mle 1870-87. The later Mortier de 270 mm modèle 1889 was based on the mle 1885 and adapted to the coastal artillery role by fitting the same barrel to a different carriage.

Although the majority of combatants had heavy field artillery prior to the outbreak of the First World War, none had adequate numbers of heavy guns in service, nor had they foreseen the growing importance of heavy artillery once the Western Front stagnated and trench warfare set in. Fortresses, armories, coastal fortification and museums were scoured for heavy artillery and sent to the front. Suitable field and rail carriages were built for these guns in an effort to give their forces the heavy field artillery needed to overcome trenches and hardened concrete fortifications.

== Design ==
The mle 1885 was breech loaded with a de Bange obturator, and used separate loading bagged charges and projectiles. The recoil system for the mle 1885 consisted of a U-shaped gun cradle which held the trunnioned barrel and a slightly inclined firing platform with hydraulic buffers. When the gun fired the hydraulic buffer slowed the recoil of the cradle which slid up a set of inclined rails on the firing platform and then returned to position by the combined action of the buffers and gravity. The carriage allowed for high angles of elevation and pivoted at the front for 30° of traverse.

At the outbreak of the First World War, it is estimated there 32 mle 1885's available. For transport the mle 1885 could be broken down into four wagon loads for horse or motor traction. The mortars could also be transferred to 600 mm (1 ft 11 5/8 in) narrow gauge rail wagons for the final leg to their firing positions. These narrow gauge tracks were also used to re-position the mortars and bring up their ammunition and supplies. Site preparation needed up to 15 men directed by 2 officers and took 7-8 hours. Site preparation included creating a base of wooden beams then assembling the mortar with cranes and block & tackle.

== Weapons of comparable performance and era ==
- 28 cm howitzer L/10 - A similar Japanese howitzer
- 28 cm Haubitze L/12 - A similar German howitzer
- 24 cm Mörser M 98 - A similar Austro-Hungarian mortar
