= Mortier de 220 mm modèle 1880 =

Mortier de 220 mm L modèle 1880
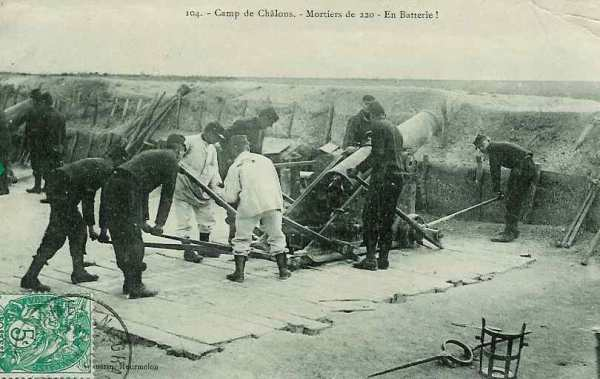
- A mle 1880 being traversed.
- Type: Heavy mortar Siege artillery
- Place of origin: France

Service history
- In service: 1880–1918
- Used by: France
- Wars: World War I

Production history
- Designer: Charles Ragon de Bange
- Designed: 1880
- Produced: 1880
- No. built: mle 1880: 330 mle 1880/91: 130 mle 1880 ACS: 100
- Variants: mle 1880/91 mle 1880 ACS

Specifications
- Mass: mle 1880: 4.24 t (4 long tons) mle 1880/91: 8.5 t (8 long tons) mle 1880 ACS: 12 t (12 long tons)
- Barrel length: 1.98 m (6.5 ft) L/9
- Shell: Separate loading bagged charges and projectiles
- Shell weight: 98–118 kg (216–260 lb)
- Caliber: 240 mm (9.4 in)
- Breech: de Bange
- Recoil: mle 1880: None mle 1880/1891: Hydro-gravity mle 1880 ACS: Hydro-gravity
- Carriage: mle 1880: Fixed mle 1880/91: Fixed mle 1880 ACS: 6-wheeled
- Elevation: -5° to +60°
- Traverse: mle 1880: Manual mle 1880/1891: 42° mle 1880 ACS: 42°
- Rate of fire: 1 shot every three minutes
- Muzzle velocity: 300 m/s (980 ft/s)
- Effective firing range: 7 km (4 mi)

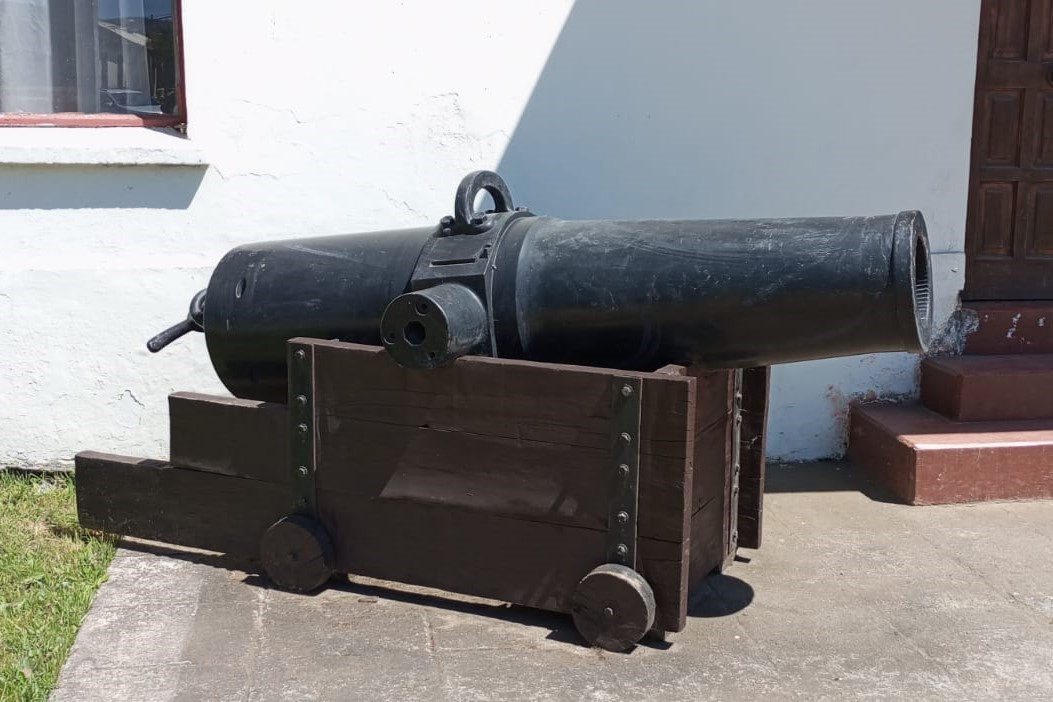

== History ==
The Mortier de 220 mm L mle 1880 was one of a series of heavy artillery pieces designed by Colonel Charles Ragon de Bange. On 11 May 1874, three de Bange heavy cannons (120 mm, 155 mm, 240 mm) and two mortars (220 mm, 270 mm) were ordered by the French Army. The mle 1880 was advanced for its time as it was built completely of steel instead of a steel liner and cast iron reinforcing hoops like the previous Canon de 240 mm C mle 1870-87.

Although the majority of combatants had heavy field artillery prior to the outbreak of the First World War, none had adequate numbers of heavy guns in service, nor had they foreseen the growing importance of heavy artillery once the Western Front stagnated and trench warfare set in. Fortresses, armories, coastal fortifications, and museums were scoured for heavy artillery and sent to the front. Suitable field and rail carriages were built for these guns in an effort to give their forces the heavy field artillery needed to overcome trenches and hardened concrete fortifications.

== Variants ==
=== mle 1880 ===
The mle 1880 was a breech loaded mortar with a de Bange obturator and used separate loading bagged charges and projectiles. The mle 1880 was originally built without a recoil mechanism and in order to traverse the carriage needed to be levered into position before and after each shot. For transport, the mle 1880 could be broken down for transport into two wagon loads (barrel and carriage) for towing by two horse teams. The mortars could also be transferred to 600 mm (1 ft 11 5/8 in) narrow gauge rail wagons for the final leg to their firing positions. These narrow gauge tracks were also used to re-position the mortars and bring up their ammunition and supplies. Site preparation included creating a firing platform made of wooden beams on soft ground. At the outbreak of the First World War, it is estimated there were 300 mle 1880s available.

=== mle 1880/91 ===
A modification program in 1891 gave the mle 1880 a carriage with a hydraulic recoil mechanism and limited traverse. The new carriage was similar to the one used on the Mortier de 270 mm modèle 1885. The 130 mortars modified were designated as the mle 1880/1891 and consisted of a U-shaped gun cradle, which held the trunnioned barrel, and a slightly inclined firing platform with hydraulic buffers. When the gun fired, the hydro-buffer slowed the recoil of the cradle, which slid up a set of inclined rails on the firing platform and then returned to position by the combined action of the buffers and gravity. For transport, it could be broken down into three loads for towing by horse teams or by artillery tractor. Site preparation consisted of creating a firing platform from wooden beams. However, a downside to the carriage modernization was the combined weight had doubled, which made transport and setup more difficult.

=== mle 1880 A.C.S. ===
The Mortier de 220 mm L modèle 1880 was a French heavy mortar employed as siege artillery during the First World War. In an effort to improve the mobility of the mle 1880, 100 mortars were given six-wheeled carriages called Affût de Circonstance Schneider. The carriages were built from steel with a two-wheeled axle at the front and a four-wheeled axle at the rear. The bed of the ACS formed the base of the mortar and it had the same recoil system as the earlier mle 1880/91. Once in position, the wheels could be retracted and the mortar sat on its base. The advantage of this system was its mobility and reduced setup time. The downside was excessive weight, it could only be towed by artillery tractors and it was unsuitable for use on soft ground.

The 220 mle 1880 A.C.S. entered service in June 1917 with the artillerie lourde à tracteurs (motorized heavy artillery). By August 1918, all of them had been replaced by 220 mm TR mle 1915/1916. The remaining mortars were used by the artillerie à pied (foot artillery) until November 1918.

== Weapons of comparable performance and era ==
- Mortaio da 210/8 D.S. - A comparable Italian mortar.
- 21 cm Mörser 10 - A comparable German mortar.

== Photo gallery ==
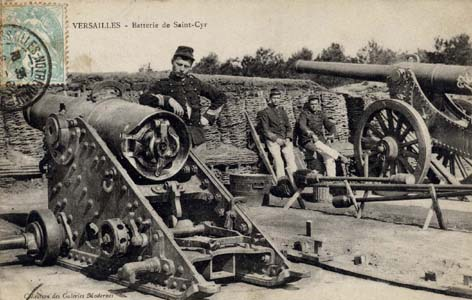
A mle 1880 with non-recoil carriage.

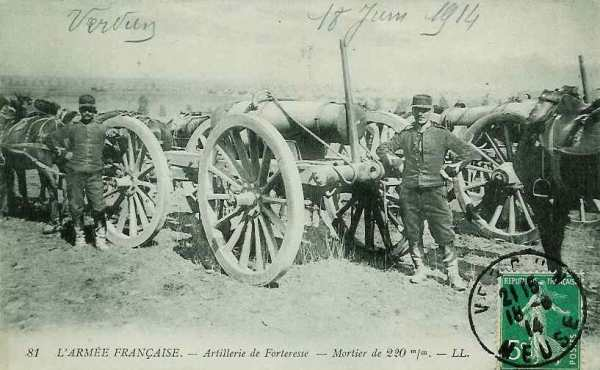
A mle 1880 broken down for transport.

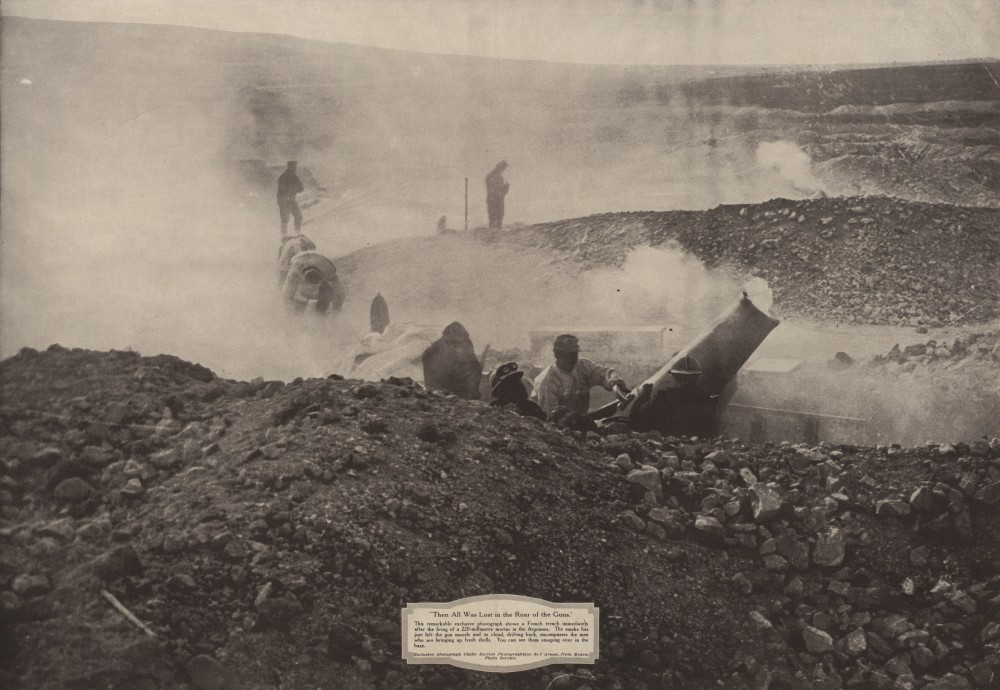
A mle 1880 in action at the Argonnes in 1915.

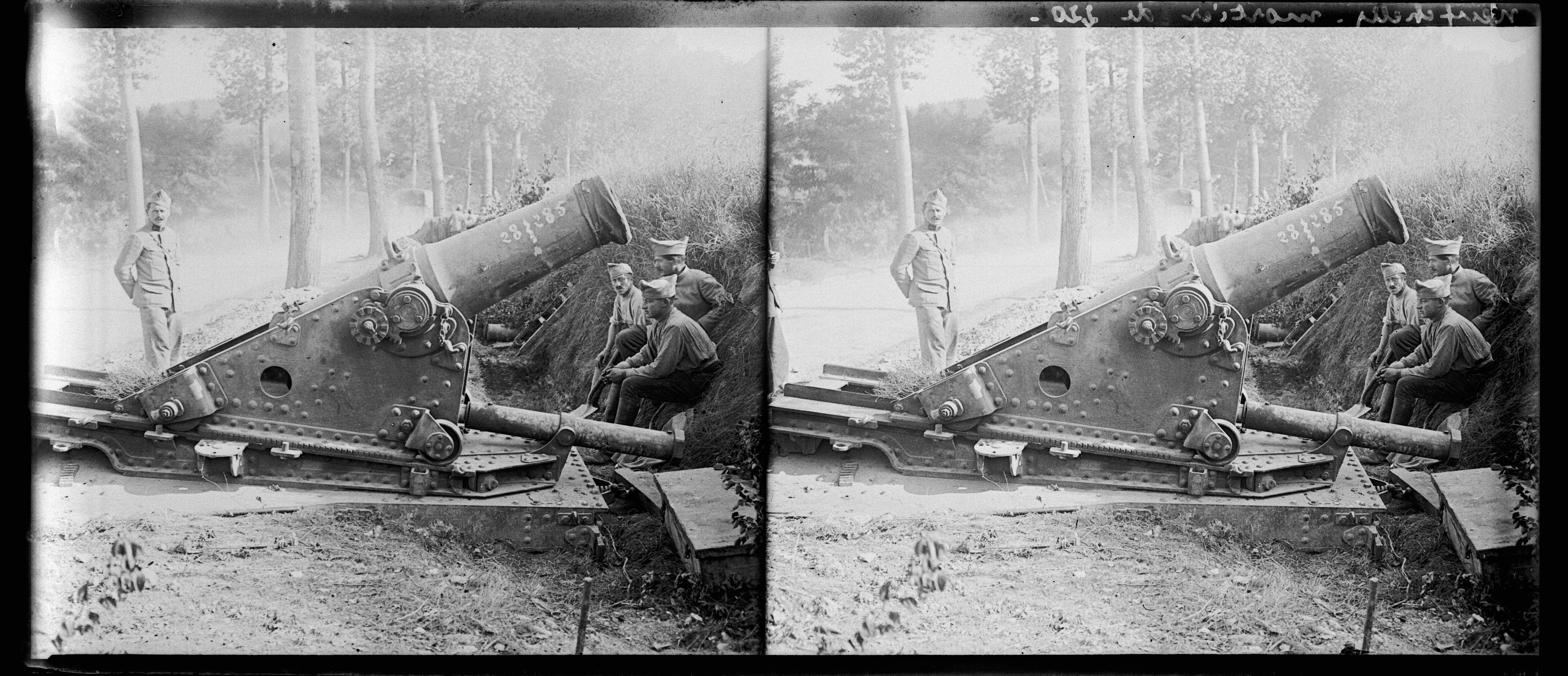
A mle 1880/91 with recoil carriage.

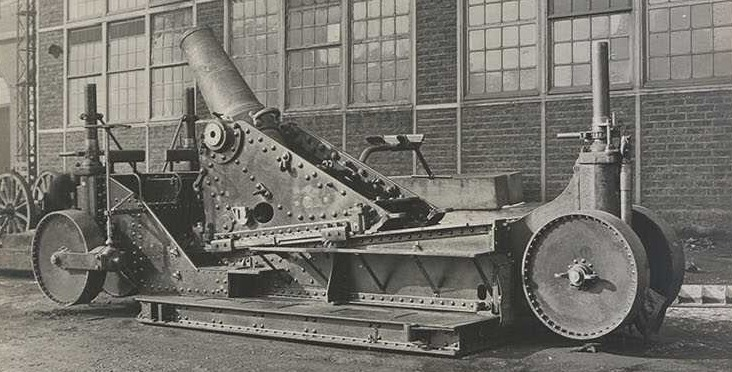
Usine du Creusot. Mortier de 220 mm A.C.S. sur affût de circonstance Schneider. En batterie.
