= Canon de 120 mm modèle 1878 =

Canon de 120 mm L modèle 1878
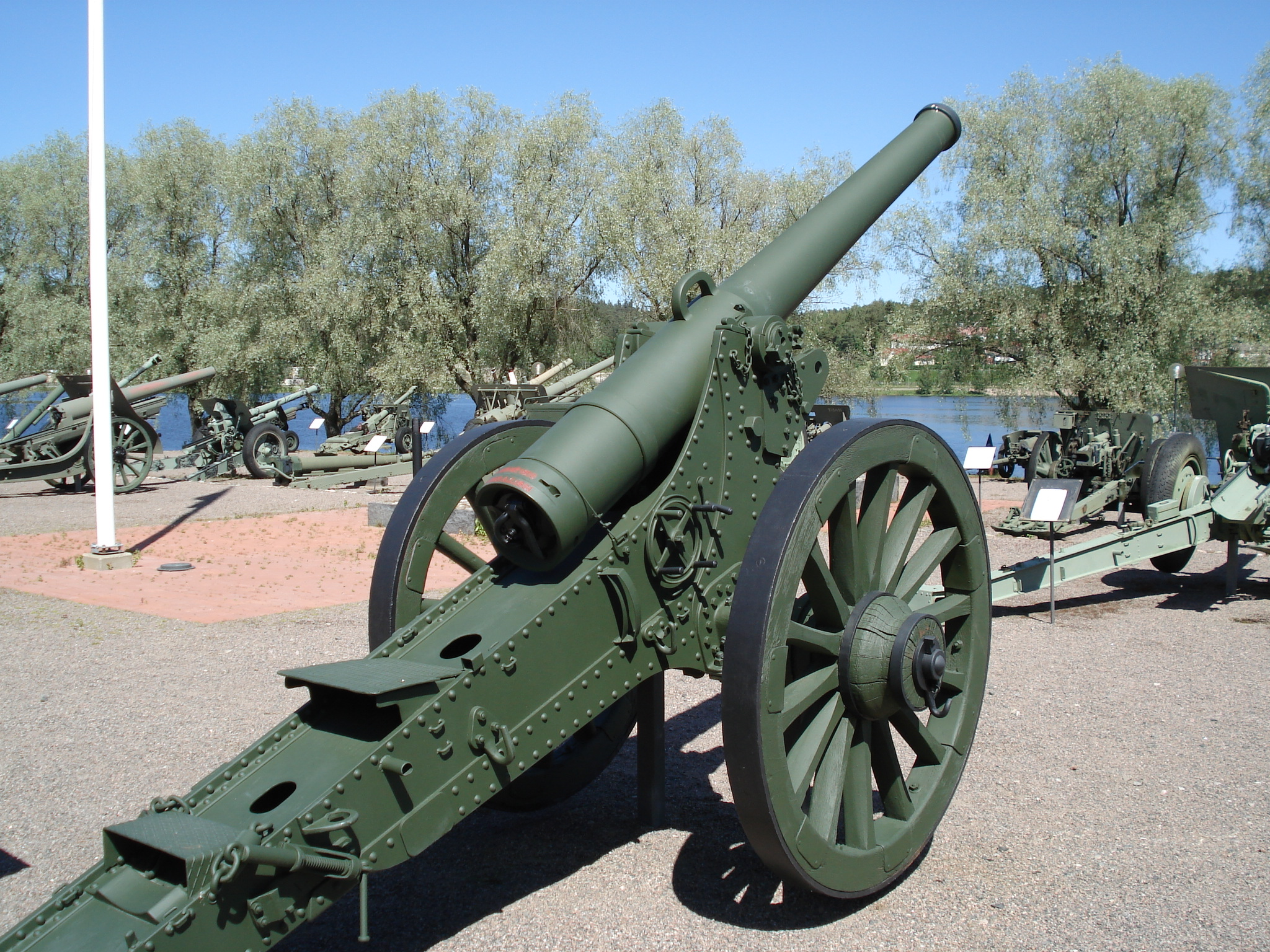
- A Finnish mle 1878 at the Hameenlinna artillery museum.
- Type: Siege gun Field gun
- Place of origin: France

Service history
- In service: 1878–1945
- Used by: See Users
- Wars: Balkan Wars; World War I Polish–Soviet War; The Winter War; World War II

Production history
- Designer: Charles Ragon de Bange
- Designed: 1878
- Manufacturer: Atelier de précision Paris
- Produced: 1878
- No. built: 2,500
- Variants: See variants

Specifications
- Mass: 2,750 kg (6,060 lb)
- Length: 5.1 m (16 ft 9 in)
- Barrel length: 3.25 m (10 ft 8 in) L/27
- Width: 2 m (6 ft 7 in)
- Crew: 5
- Shell: Separate loading bagged charges and projectiles
- Shell weight: 18–25 kg (40–55 lb)
- Caliber: 120 mm (4.7 in)
- Breech: de Bange
- Recoil: None
- Carriage: Box trail
- Elevation: -17° to +30°
- Traverse: 65°
- Rate of fire: 1 rpm
- Muzzle velocity: 525 m/s (1,720 ft/s)
- Effective firing range: 8–10 km (5–6 mi)

The Canon de 120 mm L modèle 1878 was a French piece of siege and field artillery which was widely used during the First World War and despite its obsolescence, it was still in use by some nations during the Second World War.

== History ==
The Canon de 120 mm L modèle 1878 was one of a series of heavy artillery pieces designed by Colonel Charles Ragon de Bange. On 11 May 1874 three de Bange heavy cannons (120 mm, 155 mm, 240 mm) and two mortars (220 mm, 270 mm) were ordered by the French Army. The mle 1878 was advanced for its time due to being built completely of steel instead of a steel liner and cast iron reinforcing hoops of the previous Canon de 240 mm C mle 1870-87.

== Design ==
The 120 mm L mle 1878 was a breech loaded gun with a de Bange obturator and used separate loading bagged charges and projectiles. It had a box trail carriage, two wooden spoked wheels with steel rims and an unsprung axle. The 120 mm L mle 1878 was lighter and more mobile than its heavier brother the Canon 155 mm L mle 1877. It had roughly the same range and rate of fire as the Canon 155 mm L mle 1877, but it fired a lighter projectile. The 120 mm L mle 1878 was classified as a siege et de place (stationary siege gun) for the defense and attack of Fortifications. In line with this mission, the carriage was tall because it was expected that its barrel would project out over a forts parapet and use its range to provide counter-battery fire against enemy artillery.

== First world war ==
Although the majority of combatants had heavy field artillery prior to the outbreak of the First World War, none had adequate numbers of heavy guns in service, nor had they foreseen the growing importance of heavy artillery once the Western Front stagnated and trench warfare set in. Fortresses, armories, coastal fortifications, and museums were scoured for heavy artillery and sent to the front. Suitable field and rail carriages were built for these guns in an effort to give their forces the heavy field artillery needed to overcome trenches and hardened concrete fortifications.

An early drawback of the gun was that it involved considerable time to prepare a firing platform made of timbers before use. An external recoil cylinder was then bolted to the platform and connected to the bottom of the gun carriage. Without it, the gun had no recoil mechanism and when fired the gun rolled back onto a set of ramps behind the wheels and then slid back into battery. In order to traverse the carriage had to be levered into position and due to its lack of recoil mechanism, it had to be re-aimed after every shot, which limited its rate of fire. An early modification to make the guns suitable for field use was the fitting of Bonagente grousers to the wheels to improve balance and reduce ground pressure on soft ground. An added bonus was they slowed recoil and didn't require extensive site preparation to bring the guns into action.

At the outbreak of WWI, there were 2,417 in reserve or at forts. Due to its light weight, good range, and heavy shell 120 were chosen to equip horse-drawn artillery units at the outbreak of the First World war in order to give them heavy artillery and they could be towed at 4 km/h (2.5 mph). The end of the box trail could be attached to a limber for towing and each gun was provided with a caisson for ammunition. For transport, the 120 mm L mle 1878 could be transported in one piece by a horse team in comparison to the Canon 155 mm L mle 1877 which needed to have its barrel removed from the carriage and transported separately. However, the barrel could be pulled rearward and fastened to the trail for transport.

Experiments with motor traction during 1914 were successful and there was a requirement for 100 batteries to be motorized in 1915. Motorization promised speeds of 8–10 km/h (5.0–6.2 mph) and although mobile, the carriage was lightly built which negatively affected its durability when used as a field piece. During the Second Battle of Champagne in 1915, 60% of the pieces never reached the front due to being damaged during transport and afterwards towing speed was restricted to 6 km/h (3.7 mph).

== Second world war ==
At the end of the first world war, there were still 526 guns in French service. In 1939 there were 600 pieces in reserve and During the Second World War. A number equipped the forts of the Séré system of Rivières des Hauts-de-Meuse (Fort Troyon and Fort Liouville ) with another 92 in artillery regiments of the Maginot Line. A number were also still in use with Belgium, Finland, Italy, and Poland.

== Variants ==
- Affût-truck Peigné-Canet mle 1897 – Was developed by Lieutenant Colonel Peigné and engineer Gustave Canet at the turn of the century. This conversion involved mounting the guns on rail wagons which ran on narrow-gauge 600 mm (1 ft 11 5/8 in) tracks at the forts of Verdun, Toul, Épinal, and Belfort. Each fortress was supposed to have twelve 155 C and eight 120 L guns on the same carriage. These allowed the guns to be quickly re-positioned to different parts of the fort and brought up ammunition and supplies. The guns were mounted on flatbed rail-cars with folding side panels that created a circular base when unfolded, they were also stabilized with four folding outriggers. The guns were mounted on articulated center pivot gun mounts which provided high angles of elevation, 360° of traverse and an integrated hydro-pneumatic recoil mechanism.
- Gun Shields – In 1914 some guns were fitted with gun shields, but the protection provided was poor and they rattled excessively during transport so they were removed.
- Carriage and recoil mechanism – It is believed that in addition to mounting the barrel of the Canon de 155 mm L mle 1877 on a carriage that Schneider designed for the Russian M1910 Howitzer to create the Canon de 155 L modèle 1877/14 Schneider, a limited number were also built with Canon de 120 mm L modèle 1878 barrels.
- 120 mm L mle 1878/16 – In order to replace losses and expand the numbers of guns in service the mle 1878 was put back into production in 1916. The resulting guns were classified as mle 1887/16 and incorporated the following changes: a simplified and strengthened carriage, the carriage didn't need to be connected to a limber for motor towing, increased 45° elevation, and the gun barrel didn't need to be withdrawn before transport. Lastly, the closing mechanism for the breech was reworked.
- Armata wz. 1878/09/31 and wz. 1878/10/31 – This conversion carried out in 1931 by the Starachowice Arsenal in Poland involved removing the barrel from the original carriage and mounting them on the carriages of 152 mm howitzer M1909 and 152 mm howitzer M1910 captured during the Polish-Soviet War. The recoil mechanism, lower height and integral loading tray improved the rate of fire to three rounds per minute and an enlarged propellant chamber gave higher velocity 600 m/s (2,000 ft/s) and slightly improved range 12.2 km (7.6 mi). Approximately 48 guns were converted.

== Ammunition ==
Types of ammunition available were:

- Common
- Gas
- High Explosive
- Incendiary
- Shrapnel

== Users ==
- Belgium - At least 2 artillery batteries remained in active use until the Second World War. One battery saw limited combat use with the 5th Army Corps, while another battery was employed as coastal artillery.
- Finland – During the Winter War 78 guns were given to Finland. After Poland was defeated Germany sold 24 captured wz. 1878/10/31 guns to Finland and these served until 1944.
- France
- Germany
  - German Empire – During the First World War Germany operated as many as 40 captured guns and after French ammunition supplies ran out they produced their own ammunition.
  - Nazi Germany – The Germans captured a number of these guns but their use is unknown.
- Greece – Received by the French during the First World War. Used in the Macedonian front, they later equipped the Heavy Artillery Regiment of the Army of Asia Minor during the Greco-Turkish War of 1919–1922, and were still used during World War II
- Italy – During the First World War 160 guns were delivered to Italy and at the outbreak of the Second World War 74 guns were still in operation. After the occupation of Southern France, another 59 were added.
- Kingdom of Serbia - An unknown number were used by Serbia during both the Balkan Wars and First World War.
- Poland – 54 guns were supplied to Poland in 1919 and 48 were later converted to Armata wz. 1878/09/31 and wz. 1878/10/31.
- Romania – 72 guns were supplied to Romania during the First World War.
- Turkey - Captured from Greek Army during the Greco-Turkish War of 1919–1922
- United States - US troops used a combination of French and British artillery during the First World War due to insufficient production of US made guns.

== Photo Gallery ==
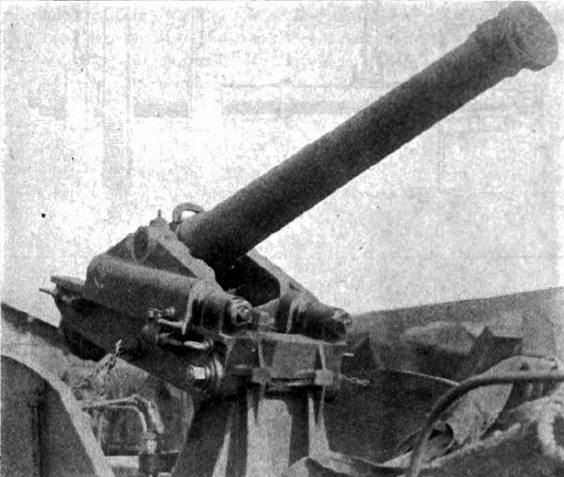
Canon de 120 mm L modèle 1878 sur_affût-truck Peigné-Canet mle 1897

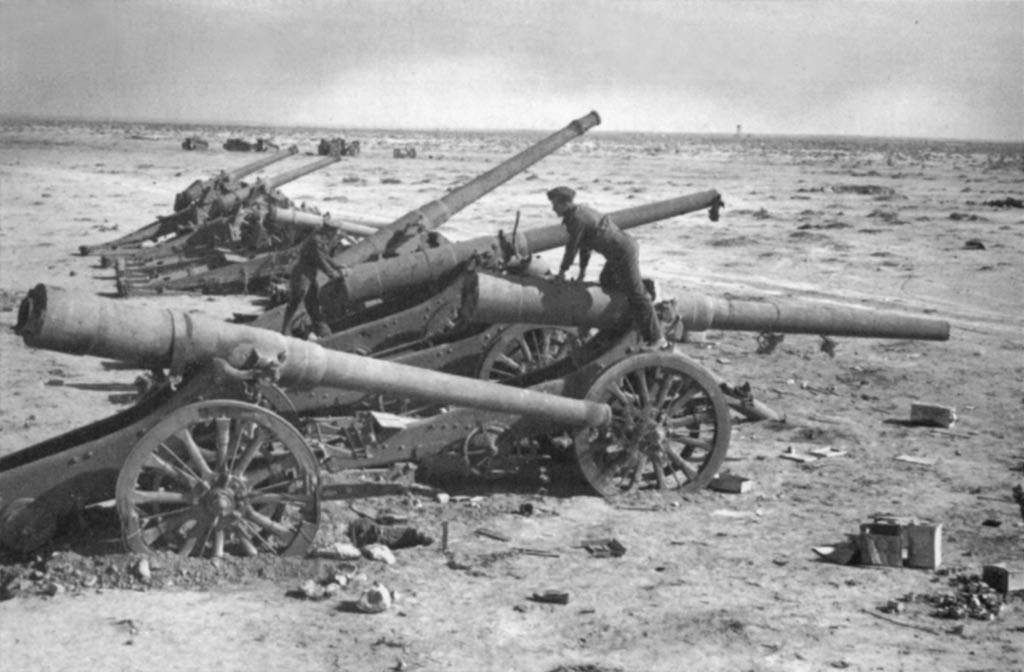
Italian guns captured in North Africa by the British.

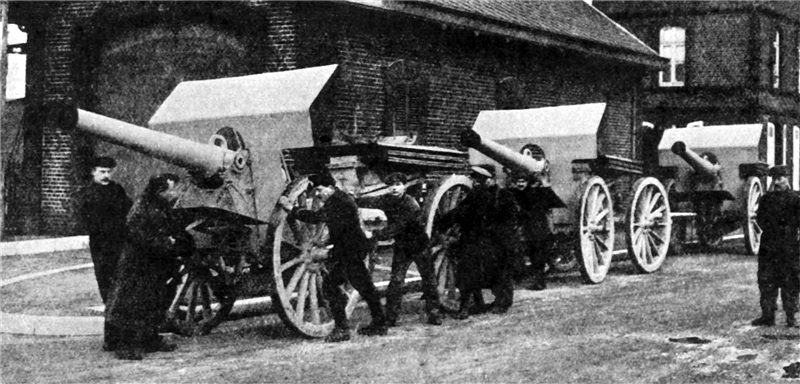
Mle 1878s with gun shields.

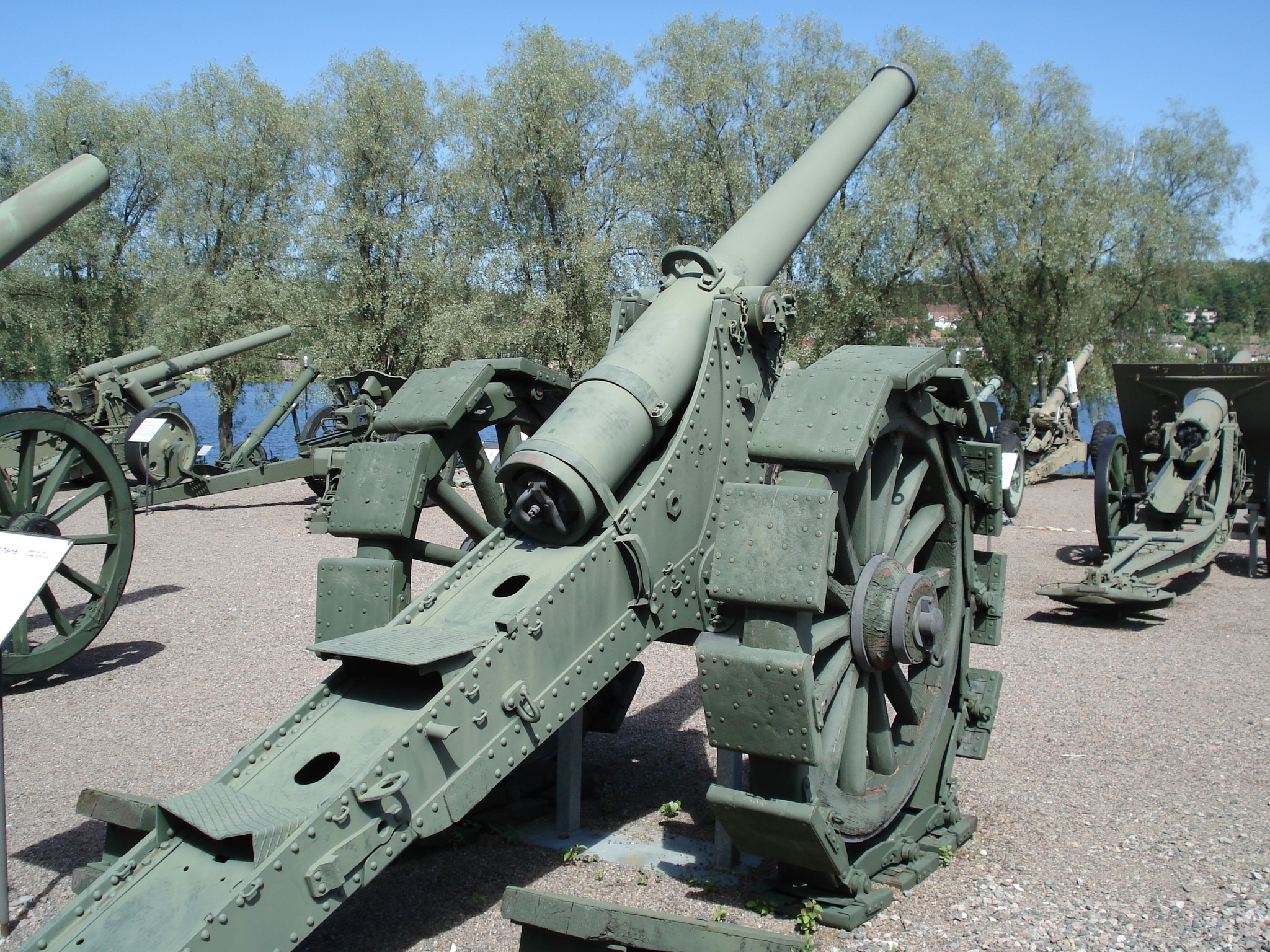
A mle 1878 with Bonagente grousers and recoil ramps.

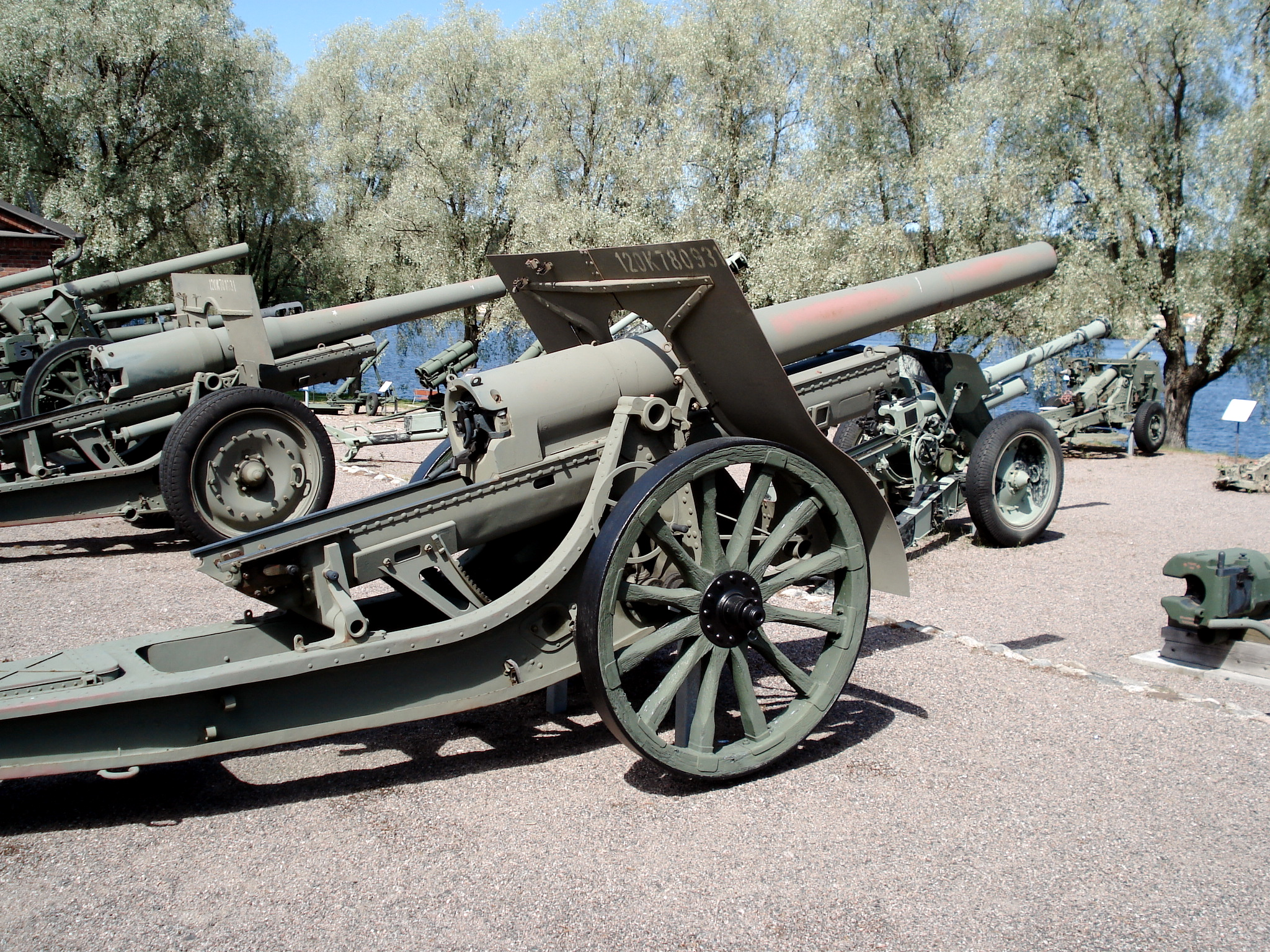
A Polish wz. 1878/10/31 at the Hameenlinna artillery museum.

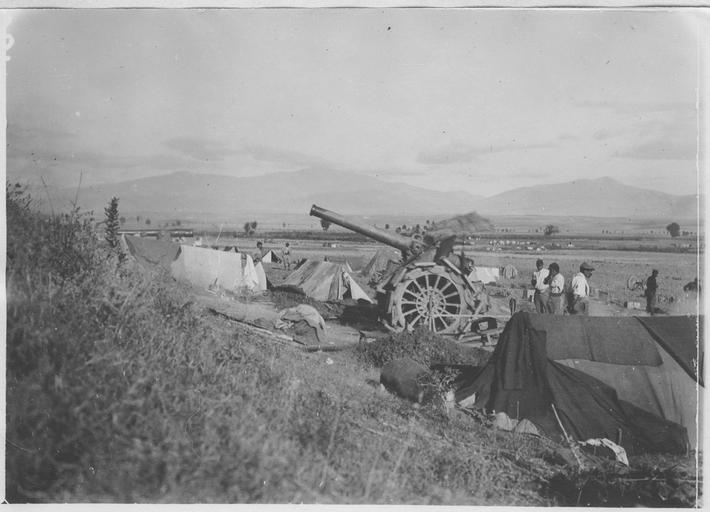
2 batteries of 120mm guns in firing positions. Taken in the Florina sector in July 1916.
