= Mortier de 270 mm modèle 1889 =

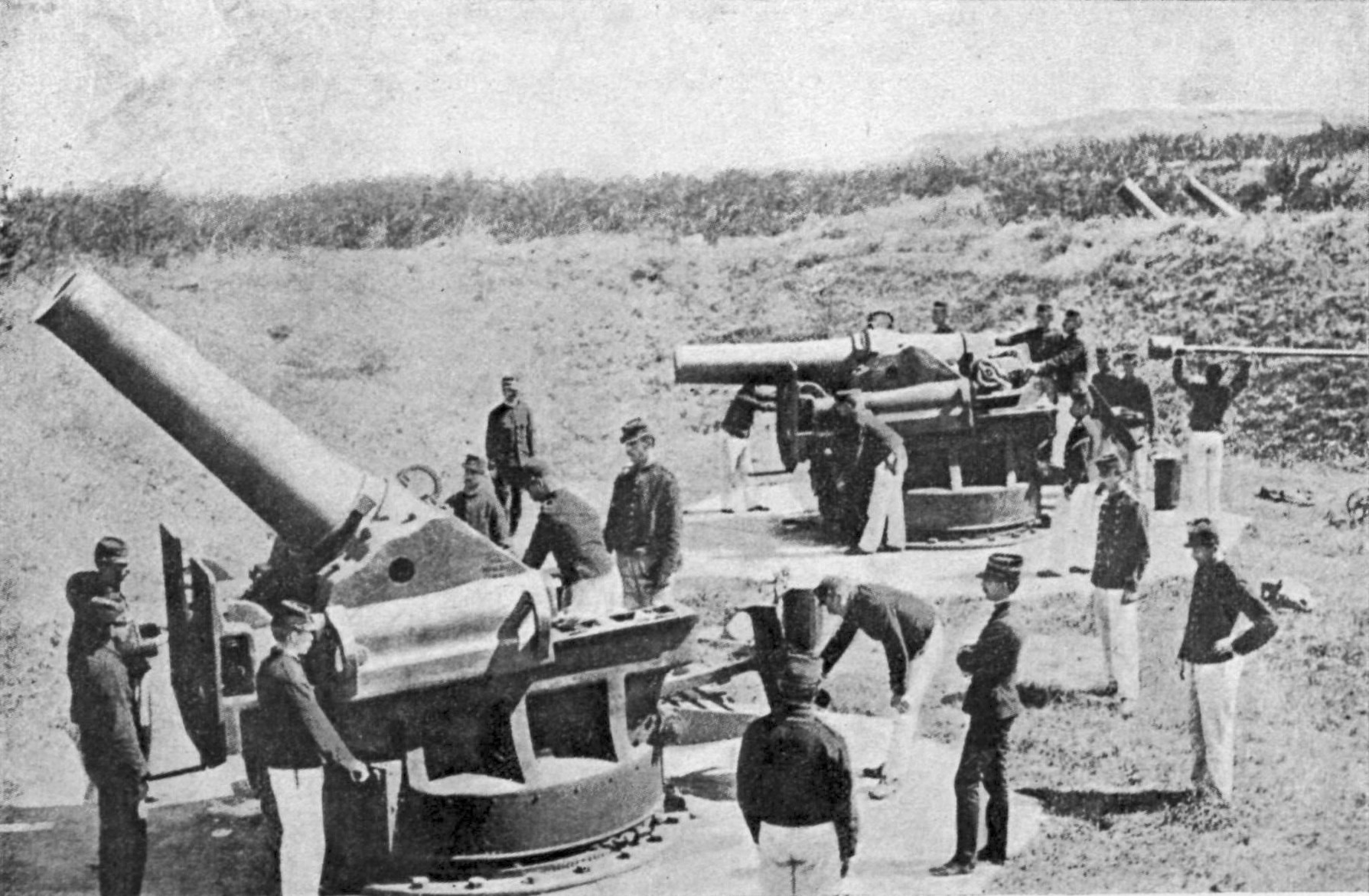
- Type: Heavy mortar Coastal artillery Siege artillery
- Place of origin: France

Service history
- Used by: France; Germany
- Wars: World War I World War II

Production history
- Designer: Charles Ragon de Bange
- Designed: 1889
- Produced: 1889
- No. built: 86?
- Variants: Mortier de 270 mm modèle 1885

Specifications
- Mass: 26.5 t (26 long tons)
- Barrel length: 3.35 m (11 ft) L/12
- Shell: Separate loading bagged charges and projectiles
- Shell weight: 180–230 kg (400–510 lb)
- Caliber: 270 mm (11 in)
- Breech: de Bange
- Recoil: Hydraulic recoil mechanism
- Carriage: Vavasseur mounting
- Elevation: -7° to +60°
- Traverse: 300°
- Rate of fire: 1 shot every three minutes
- Muzzle velocity: 420 m/s (1,400 ft/s)
- Maximum firing range: 10.4 km (6.5 mi)

The Mortier de 270 mm modèle 1889 sur affût G was a heavy mortar originally employed as coastal artillery and later converted to the siege artillery role. Mle 1889 mortars were used in both the First World War and Second World Wars.

== History ==
The Mortier de 270 mm G mle 1885 was one of a series of heavy artillery pieces designed by Colonel Charles Ragon de Bange. On 11 May 1874 three de Bange heavy cannons (120 mm, 155 mm, 240 mm) and two mortars (220 mm, 270 mm) were ordered by the French Army.

The mle 1889 was advanced for its time due to being built completely of steel instead of a steel liner and cast iron reinforcing hoops of the previous Canon de 240 mm C mle 1870-87. The mle 1889 was derived from the earlier Mortier de 270 mm modèle 1885 siege mortar and adapted to the coastal artillery role by fitting the same barrel to a different carriage.

== Variants ==
=== Coastal Artillery ===
In the coastal artillery role, the mle 1889 was intended to pierce the thin decks of armored warships with high angle plunging fire, rather than piercing their armored belt. The mle 1889 was mounted on a Vavasseur mount which consisted of a large diameter geared steel ring set into a concrete slab behind a parapet. The Vavasseur mounts allowed high angles of elevation with 300° of traverse. The mount was traversed by a worm gear which attached to the base. The mle 1889 was breech loaded with a de Bange obturator, and separate loading bagged charges and projectiles.

The recoil system for the mle 1889 consisted of a U-shaped gun cradle which held the trunnioned barrel and a slightly inclined firing platform with hydraulic buffers. When the gun fired the hydraulic buffer slowed the recoil of the cradle which slid up a set of inclined rails on the firing platform and then returned to position by the combined action of the buffers and gravity. At the outbreak of the First World War, it is estimated there were 86 mle 1889's deployed in coastal fortifications. During the Second World War 24 guns were still in reserve. The German Army used these as coastal artillery under the name 27 cm Küstenmörser 585 (f).

=== Siege Artillery ===
Although the majority of combatants had heavy field artillery prior to the outbreak of the First World War, none had adequate numbers of heavy guns in service, nor had they foreseen the growing importance of heavy artillery once the Western Front stagnated and trench warfare set in. Two sources of heavy artillery suitable for conversion to field use were coastal fortifications and surplus naval guns. Suitable field and rail carriages were built for these guns in an effort to give their forces the heavy field artillery needed to overcome trenches and hardened concrete fortifications.

Although an older design the need for heavy artillery on the Western Front was so pressing that 86 mortars were converted to field use as siege mortars between 1915 and 1917. The conversion consisted of the steel firing platform of the coastal gun being placed on top of a platform made from wooden beams in the field. The mle 1889 could be broken down into three loads for rail transport. Once at a rail station behind the front the mortars could be transferred to 600 mm (1 ft 11 5/8 in) narrow gauge rail wagons for the final leg to their firing positions. These narrow gauge tracks were also used to re-position the mortars and bring up their ammunition and supplies. Once the firing platform had been assembled the mortar could be assembled in two hours by cranes and block & tackle.

== Photo Gallery ==
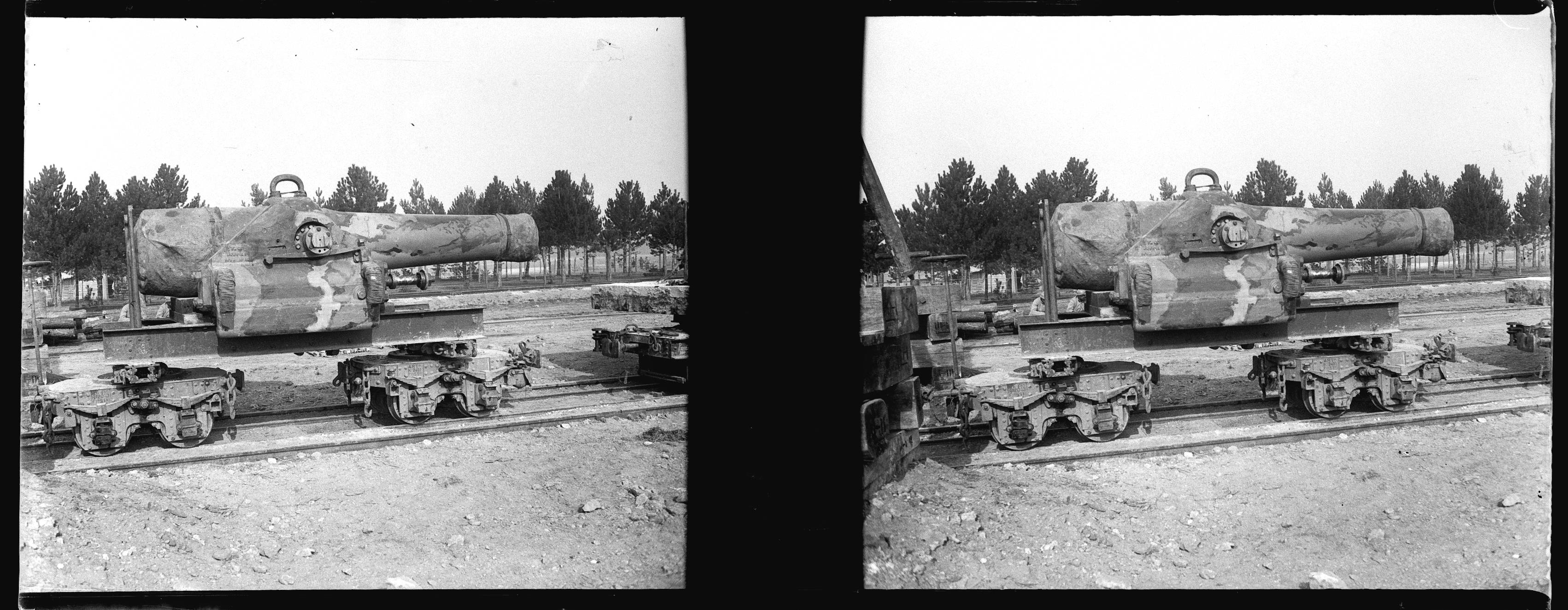
Stereo view of a mle 1889 being transported to the front.

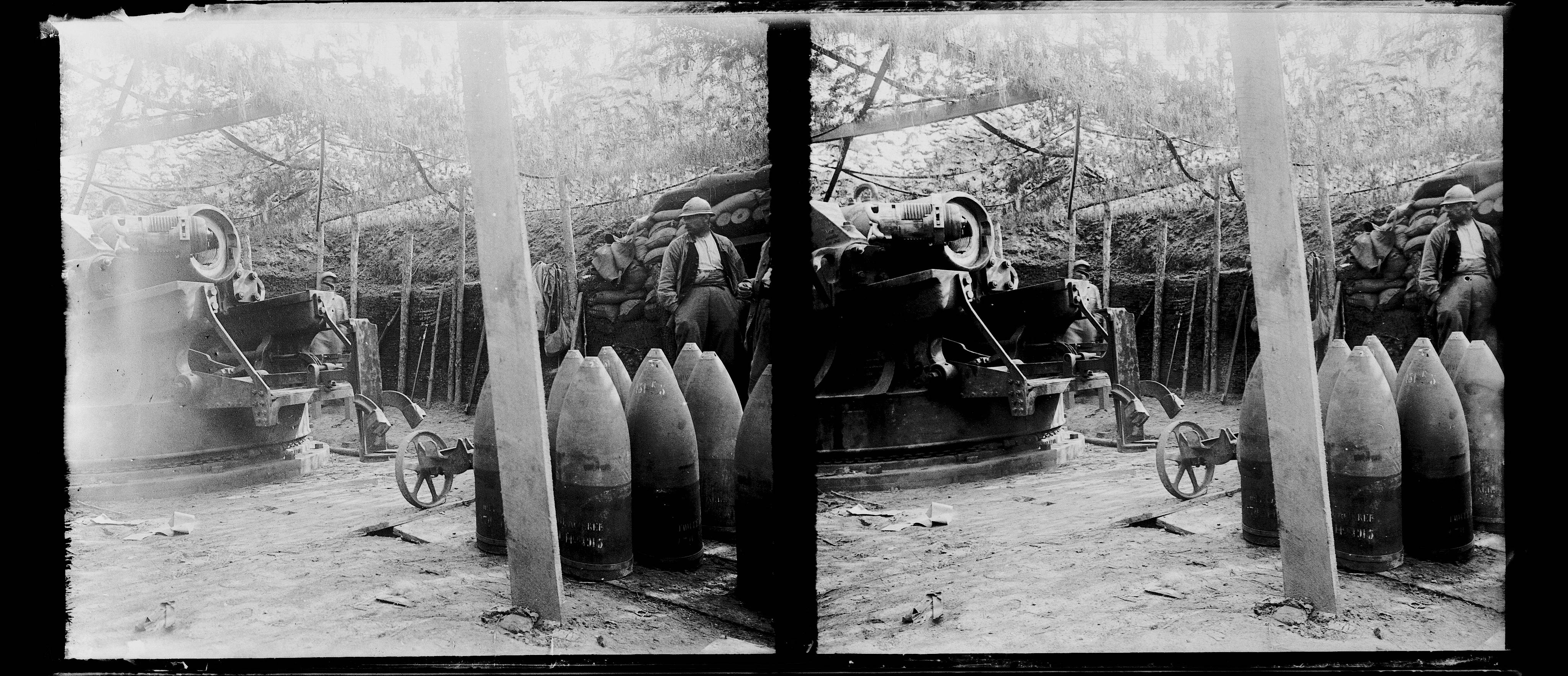
Stereo view of a mle 1889 in a heavily camouflaged position.

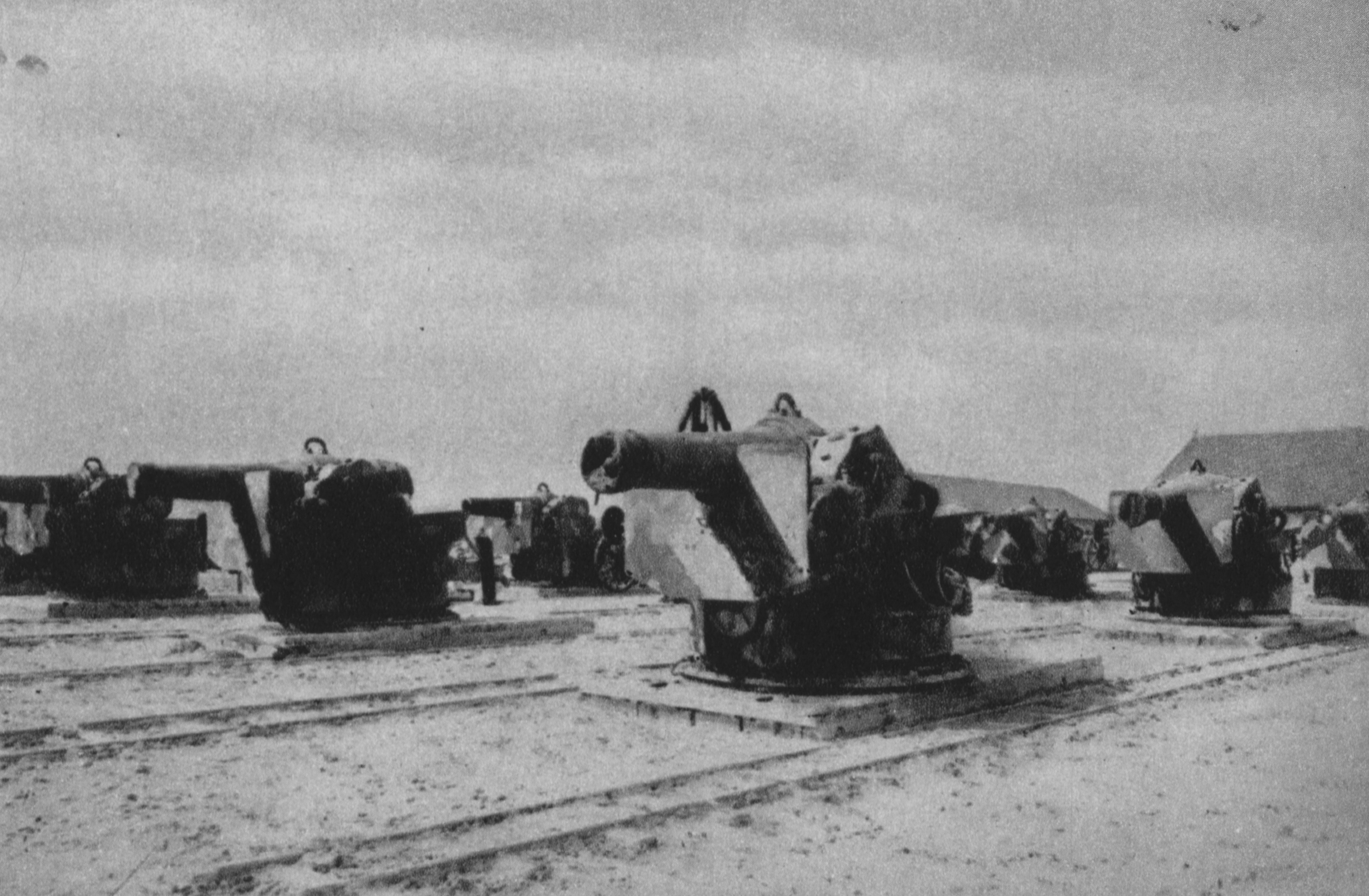
Mle 1889's at a reserve depot captured by the Germans.

== Weapons of comparable performance and era ==
- 28 cm howitzer L/10 - A similar Japanese howitzer
- 28 cm Haubitze L/12 - A similar German howitzer
- 24 cm Mörser M 98 - A similar Austro-Hungarian mortar
