= Canon de 240 L Mle 1884 =

Canon de 240 mm L modèle 1884
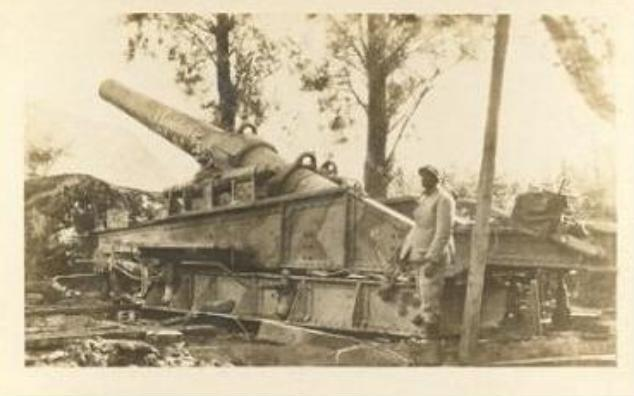
- A US soldier with a Canon 240 mm Mle 1884 sur affût à Tracteur Saint-Chamond.
- Type: Coastal artillery Siege artillery Railway artillery
- Place of origin: France

Service history
- Used by: France; Italy; Nazi Germany
- Wars: World War I World War II

Production history
- Designer: Charles Ragon de Bange
- Designed: 1873
- Manufacturer: St. Chamond
- Produced: 1884
- No. built: 60 guns and 60 spare barrels

Specifications
- Mass: 31,000 kg (68,000 lb)
- Barrel length: 6.7 m (22 ft) L/26
- Shell: 162 kg (357 lb)
- Shell weight: HE; 140 kg (310 lb)
- Caliber: 240 mm (9.4 in)
- Breech: de Bange
- Recoil: Hydro-gravity
- Elevation: 0° to +38°
- Traverse: 10°
- Rate of fire: 1 shot every three minutes
- Muzzle velocity: 575 m/s (1,890 ft/s)
- Maximum firing range: 17.3 km (10.7 mi)

The Canon de 240 mm L modèle 1884 was a heavy artillery piece originally employed as coastal artillery and later converted to siege artillery and railway artillery roles. Mle 1884 guns were used in both World War I and World War II.

== History ==
The Canon de 240 mm L mle 1884 was one of a series of heavy artillery pieces designed by Colonel Charles Ragon de Bange. On 11 May 1874 three de Bange heavy cannons (120 mm, 155 mm, 220 mm) and two mortars (220 mm, 270 mm) were ordered by the French Army.

The mle 1884 was advanced for its time due to being built completely of steel instead of a steel liner and cast iron reinforcing hoops of the previous Canon de 240 mm C mle 1870-87. The mle 1884 was also breech loaded with a de Bange obturator and a simple hydraulic recoil system.

== Variants ==
=== Coastal Artillery ===
In the coastal artillery role, the mle 1884 was mounted on a variety of mounts. One of the most simple was the Canon 240 mm Mle 1884 sur affût à échantigolles which was a wooden naval carriage which lacked traverse and recoil mechanisms. The mle 1884 was also mounted on a number of different barbettes which normally consisted of a large diameter geared steel ring set into a concrete slab behind a parapet. A rectangular steel firing platform sat on top of the ring with the barrel of the gun overhanging the parapet at the front and an overhanging loading platform to the rear. The firing platform was then traversed by a worm gear which attached to the base.

The recoil system for the mle 1884 consisted of a U-shaped gun cradle which held the trunnioned barrel and a slightly inclined firing platform with hydraulic buffers. When the gun fired the hydraulic buffer slowed the recoil of the cradle which slid up a set of inclined rails on the firing platform and then returned to position by the combined action of the buffers and gravity. Later some mle 1884's were modified to use a Canet breech to reduce the number of crew needed to service the gun and increase its rate of fire. The resulting gun was designated the Canon de 240 TR mle 1884/03. At the outbreak of the First World War, it is estimated there were 149 mle 1884's deployed in coastal fortifications.

=== Siege Artillery ===
Although the majority of combatants had heavy field artillery prior to the outbreak of the First World War, none had adequate numbers of heavy guns in service, nor had they foreseen the growing importance of heavy artillery once the Western Front stagnated and trench warfare set in. Two sources of heavy artillery suitable for conversion to field use were coastal fortifications and surplus naval guns. Suitable field and rail carriages were built for these guns in an effort to give their forces the heavy field artillery needed to overcome trenches and hardened concrete fortifications.

Although an older design the need for heavy artillery on the Western Front was so pressing that at least five different mounts were devised for the mle 1884: two static and three railroad. The initial conversion of 16 guns was carried out by the Arsenal de Toulon and was designated the Canon de 240 mm mle 1884 sur affût à échantigolles. These consisted of the steel firing platform of the coastal gun being placed on top a platform made from wooden beams. There was no traverse mechanism so the entire platform had to be aligned with the target. Despite these limitations, the conversions were considered successful.

In 1915 St. Chamond was given the task of building a carriage for the mle 1884 and the design was accepted in 1916. The new gun was designated the Canon de 240 mm mle 1884 sur affût à Tracteur Saint-Chamont or Canon de 240 mm L modèle 1884 and St. Chamond completed sixty guns between October 1916 and October 1917. For transport, the mle 1884 could be broken down into two 20,000 kg (44,000 lb) loads each with their own carriage. Each carriage was towed by an artillery tractor with the tractors consuming about 1,000 L (260 US gal) of gasoline per 100 km (62 mi). Therefore, the artillery tractors were only used near the front with long-distance transport accomplished by rail. Once onsite the guns could be assembled in approximately 24 hours by cranes and block & tackle.

The new mount used the same large diameter geared base as the coastal mount with 10° traverse and 38° elevation was possible. The new guns were popular due to good barrel wear, long range, and heavy 140 kg (310 lb) shell. Guns that survived the war were designated the Canon de Mle 84/17 and used again during World War II. In 1939, twelve guns were mobilized and those captured by the Wehrmacht after the Fall of France were designated Kanone 556(f) and used for coastal defense.

=== Railway Artillery ===
In addition to its siege gun and coastal artillery roles, the mle 1884 was also converted to act as railway artillery:

- The first of these conversions was designated the Canon de 240 mm mle 1884 sur de Circonstance Schneider. The gun and its base were attached to a 5-axle railroad carriage built by Schneider. There was no traverse for the carriage and to aim the gun had to be drawn across a section of curved track. The gun cradle used the same hydro-gravity recoil system as the coastal defense gun. The carriage had 4 wooden transverse beams that could be screwed down to anchor the carriage in place to absorb recoil. There was also a windlass at the front of the carriage to return the gun to position if it recoiled.
- The second conversion of the mle 1884 began during 1914 to mount the earlier Canon de 240 mm G mle 1870–87 on a railroad carriage and was designated the Canon de 24 cm modèle 1870-87 et modèle 1870-93 sur affut tous azimuts Batignolles. This was one of the first pieces of railway artillery built by Batignolles and featured 360° of traverse. The gun rested on two three-axle bogies. Before firing, 4 steel beams were anchored across the track, and 4 lateral outriggers were unfolded next to the track to ensure the stability and 360° fire. A loading platform on the rear of the firing platform could carry five ready rounds and charges which raised the rate of fire to four shots in five minutes. The conversion was successful but the mle 1870-87 was a very old gun and due to its mixed construction, each metal had different thermal properties which accelerated barrel wear. Therefore, it was decided in early 1917 to mate the mle 1884 with the Batignolles rail carriage and designated the Canon de 240 mm Mle 1884 sur affût-Trucs TAZ. The combination was successful and considered one of the best pieces of French rail artillery by combining a powerful and accurate gun with 360° traverse. Guns which survived the First World War later saw action in the Second World War and those captured by the Germans were given the designation 24cm K(E) 557(f) and used as coastal artillery.
- The last conversion of the mle 1884 began late in 1917 and used the same rail carriage as the Canon 240 mm Mile 1884 sur de Circonstance Schneider. However, the gun originally mounted on the carriage was the Canon de 240 mm G mle 1876 with mle 1884 barrels eventually replacing worn mle 1876 barrels. The details are largely the same as the previous conversion and were designated Canon 240 mm Mle 1884 sur affût de fortune Mle 1917. It is believed that the 38 converted were too late to enter service during the First World War. Eight mle 17 guns were mobilized during the Second world war and five were captured by the Germans who gave them the designation 24 cm Kanone (Eisenbahn) 557(f). Three were used by the Germans and two were given to the Italians after the Fall of France. After the Italian capitulation the two guns given to Italy returned to German service.

== Photo Gallery ==
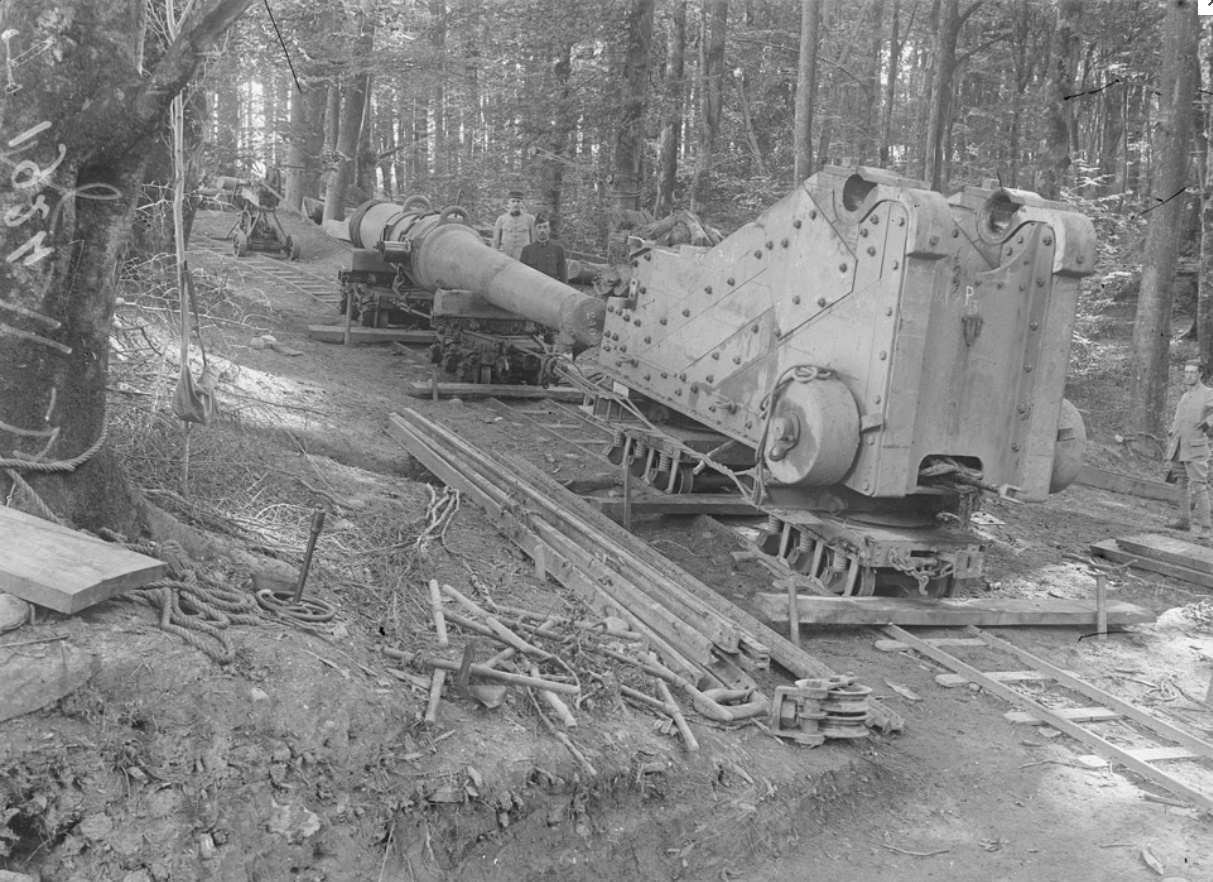
A Canon 240 mm Mle 1884 sur affût à échantigolles

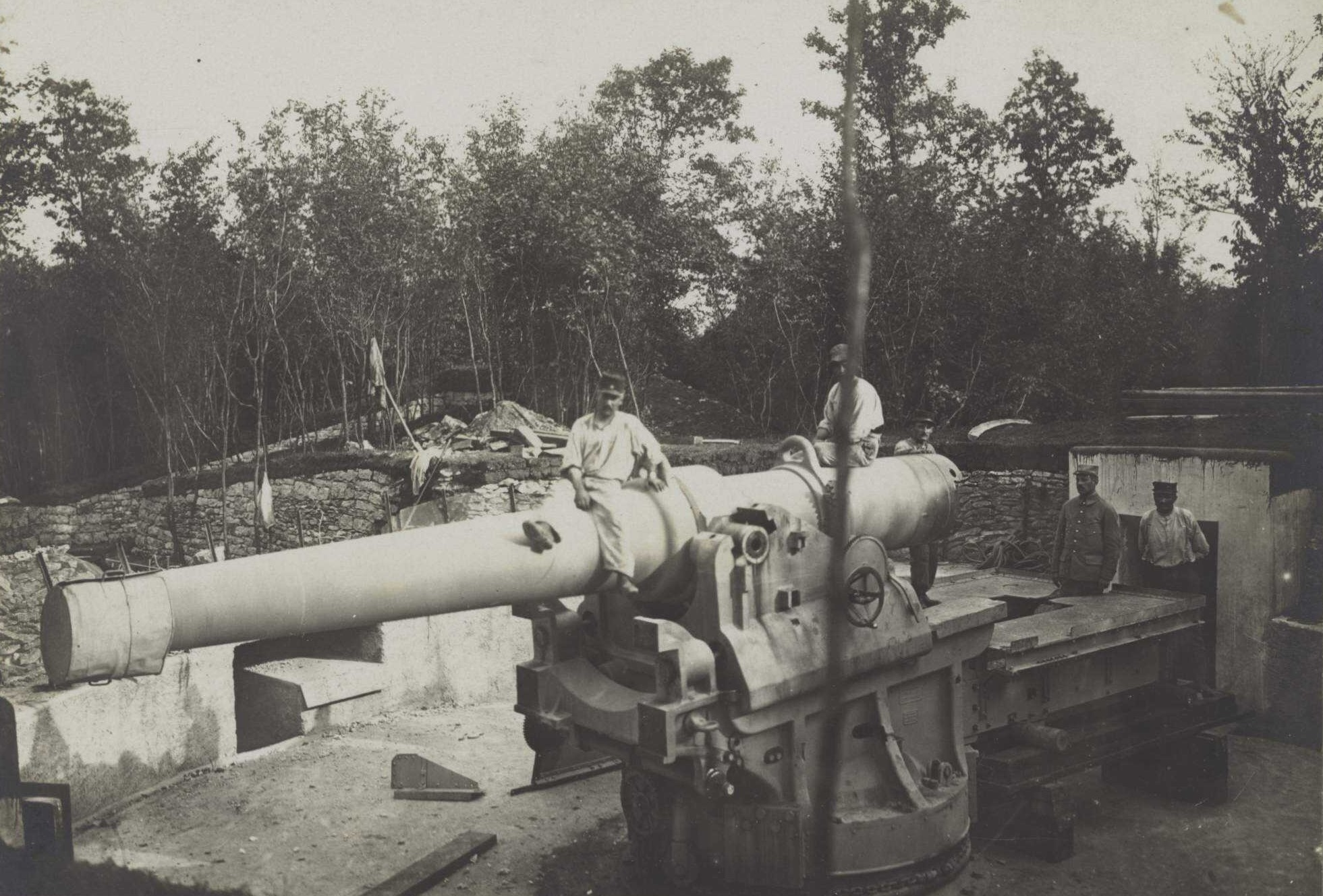
A Canon de 240 L Mle 1884 on a center pivot mount.

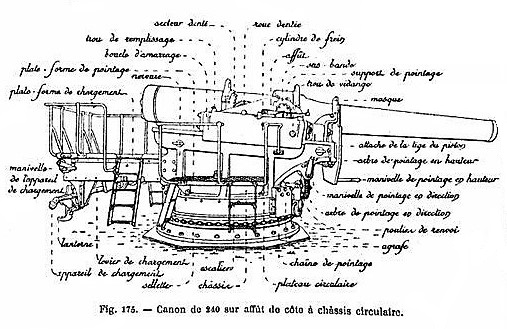
A diagram of a Canon de 240 L Mle 1884 on a center pivot mount.

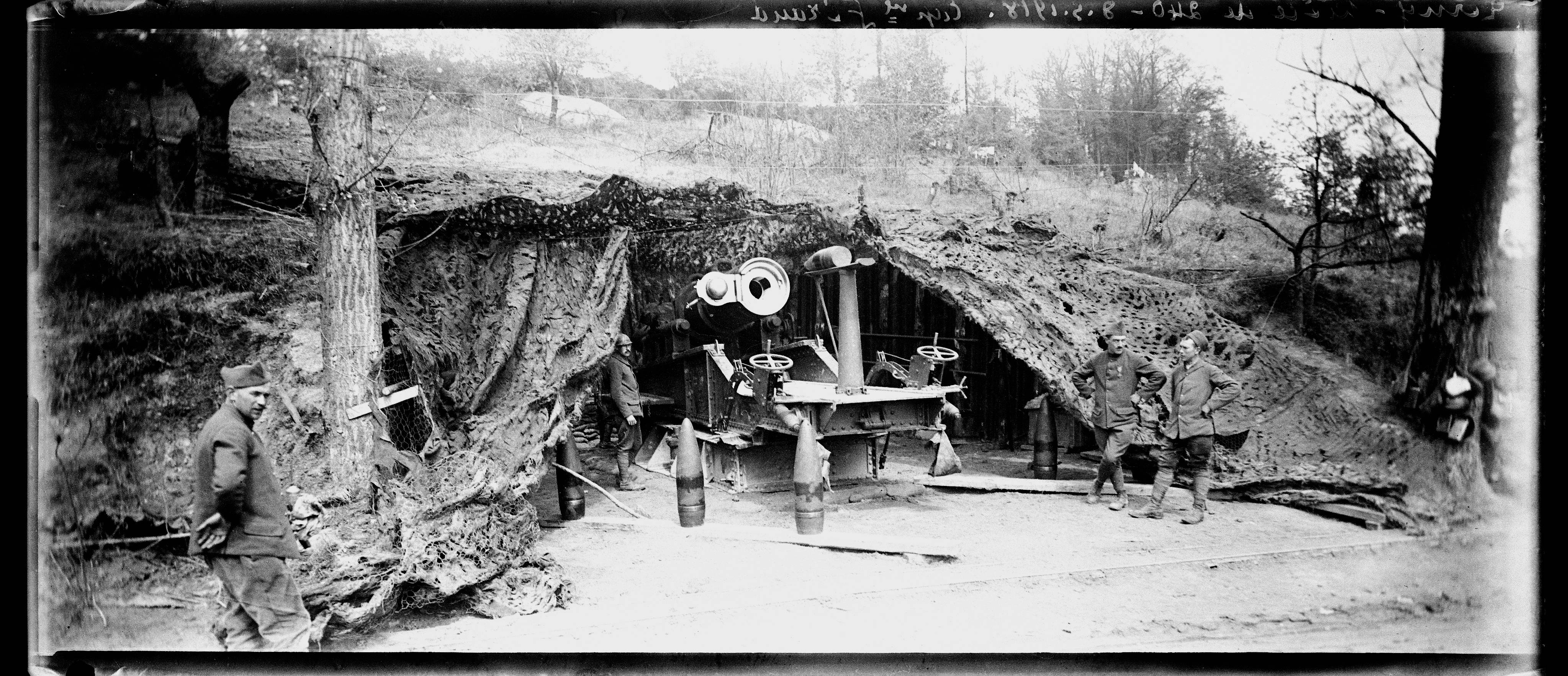
A camouflaged Canon de 240 mle 1884 employed as field artillery at Terny-Sorny (Aisne) May 8, 1918.

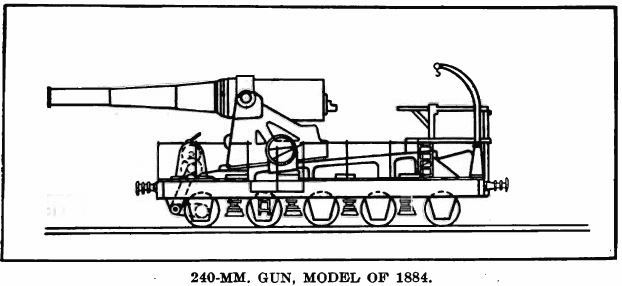
A line drawing of a Canon de 240 mm Mle 1884 sur de Circonstance Schneider.

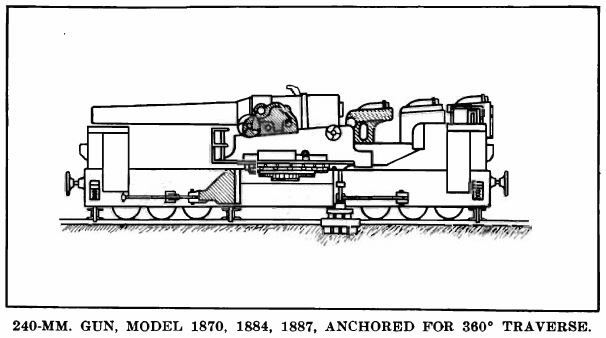
A line drawing of a Canon de 240 mm Mle 1884 sur affût-Trucs TAZ.
