= Charles Ragon de Bange =

French artillery officer and weapon designer (1833–1914)

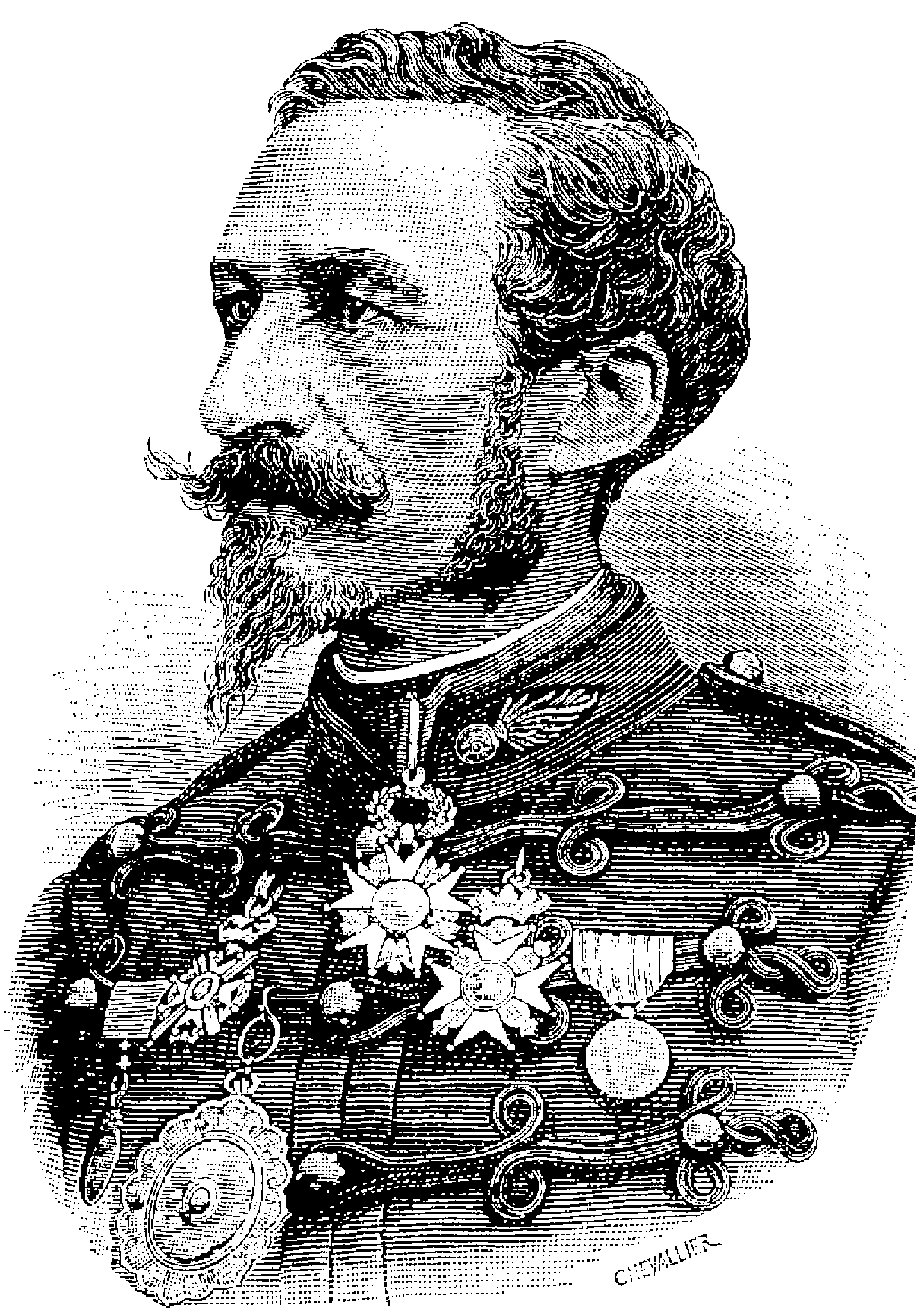
- Charles Ragon de Bange.
- Born: 17 October 1833
- Died: 9 July 1914 (aged 80)
- Military career
- Allegiance: France
- Branch: French Army (Artillery)
- Rank: Colonel

Charles Ragon de Bange (17 October 1833 – 9 July 1914) was a French artillery officer and Polytechnician. He invented the first effective obturator system for breech-loading artillery, which remains in use. He also designed a system of field guns of various calibers which served the French Army well into World War I: the Système de Bange.

== Career ==
=== De Bange breech obturator system ===
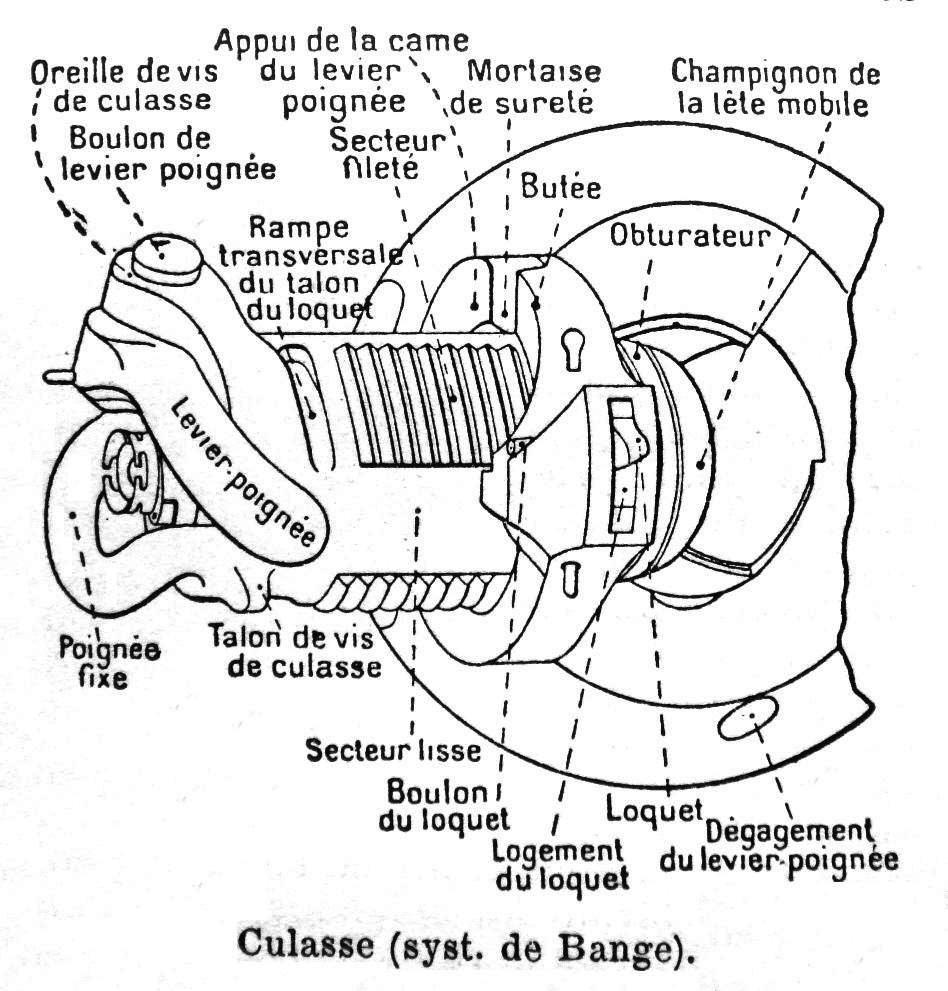
Cannon breech with de Bange system.

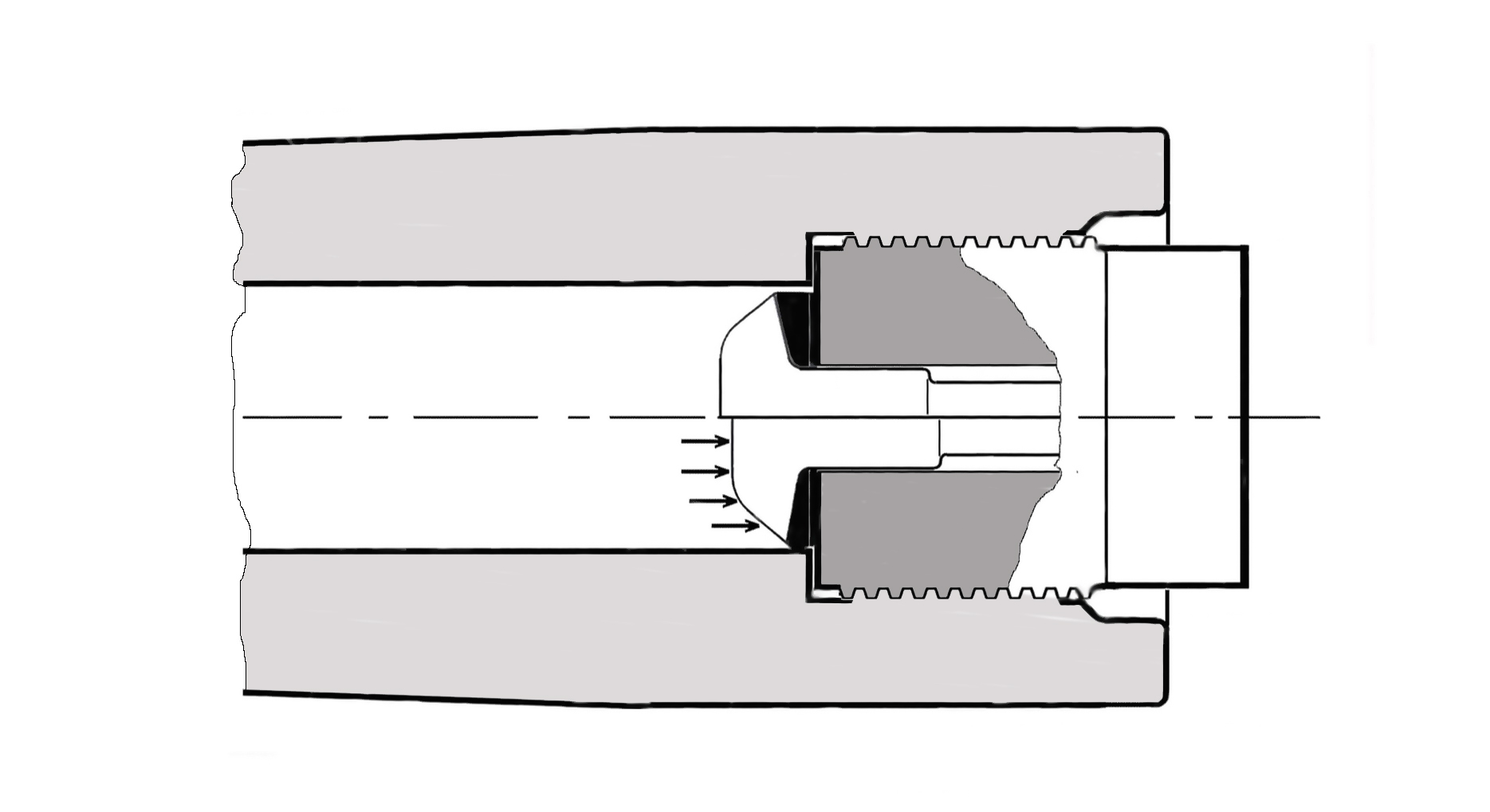
DeBange breech, function of the obturating ring

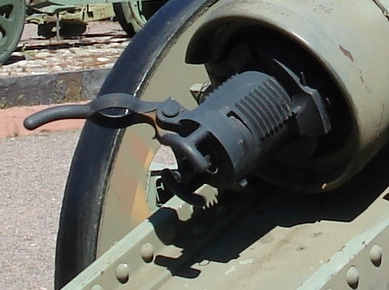
Detail of the de Bange mechanism on a 155 mm de Bange siege cannon.

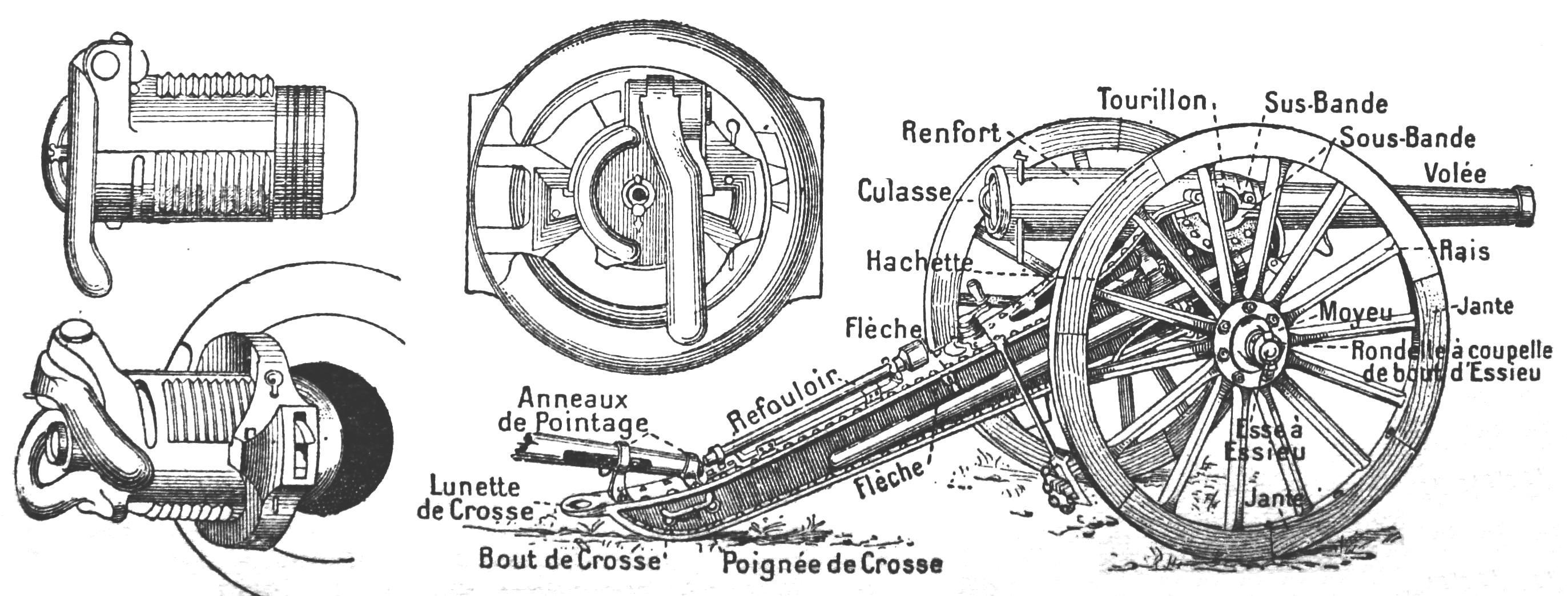
De Bange obturator mechanism on the de Bange 90 mm field cannon.

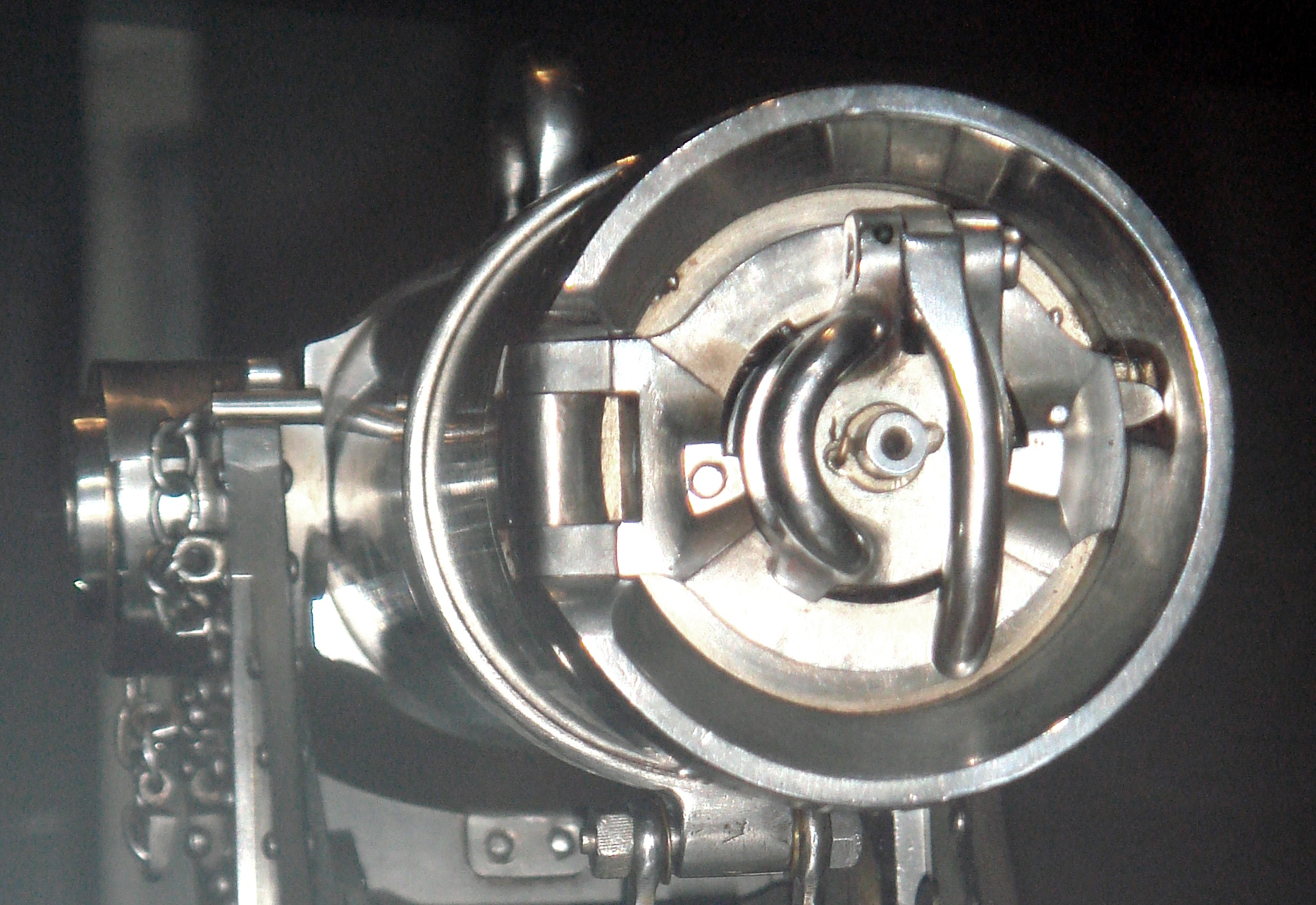
View of a de Bange 155 mm from the breech. Musée de l'Armée.

Many attempts had been made at developing breech-loading cannons, but had only partial success sealing of the breech. When fired, hot gases and burning gunpowder could escape, losing power and potentially burning the operating crew. Rifles, with smaller loads and thus less stress, were able to use rubber in O-rings as on the Chassepot rifle. The same principle of breech sealing for cannons was not as easy to develop. Several materials were able to hold the pressure and heat of cannon fire, but did not expand like rubber, thereby failing to provide a tight seal. The most successful of those designs was the Broadwell ring invented by American engineer Lewis Wells Broadwell (who worked as a sales agent for the Gatling Gun Company in Europe) in the early 1860s and widely applied (without a license) by the Krupp company on Krupp gun breech-loaders.

In 1872, de Bange designed the de Bange system, a new type of obturating ring for breech-loading artillery pieces. His system used the same general principle devised by Andrew Hotchkiss ca. 1855 for his rifled muzzle-loading projectiles, wherein two parts of the shell squeezed a soft (in that case lead) ring under the pressure of gunpowder fumes to obturate the barrel (see Rotation of ammunition), and used a breech block made of three parts: an interrupted screw locking mechanism at the rear; a doughnut-shaped grease-impregnated asbestos pad that sealed the breech; and a rounded movable "nose cone" at the front. When the gun fired the nose was driven rearward, compressing the asbestos pad and squeezing it so it expanded outward to seal the breech. The French referred to the shape of the breech's nose as "mushroom like".

The action was controlled by a handle, which normally was mounted vertically on the right side of the breech. When lifted, the handle operated a cam that forced the breech to rotate counter-clockwise, unlocking the interrupted thread. The breech was then pulled rearward with the same handle, sliding on a ring-shaped holder. The breech holder was hinged on one side, normally the left, so when the breech block was slid all the way to the rear it could be rotated out of the way for loading.

The de Bange system was widely adopted, including by the United States Navy and the British Royal Navy. The technique developed by de Bange is still in use.

The only major improvement to the original de Bange system was the introduction of the stepped screw in the Welin breech block of 1889, which greatly increased the load-bearing surface of the breech, allowing it to be made shorter, simpler, more secure, and faster to operate. Other block mechanisms are also used but the de Bange obturator remains widespread.

=== Manufacture of cannons ===
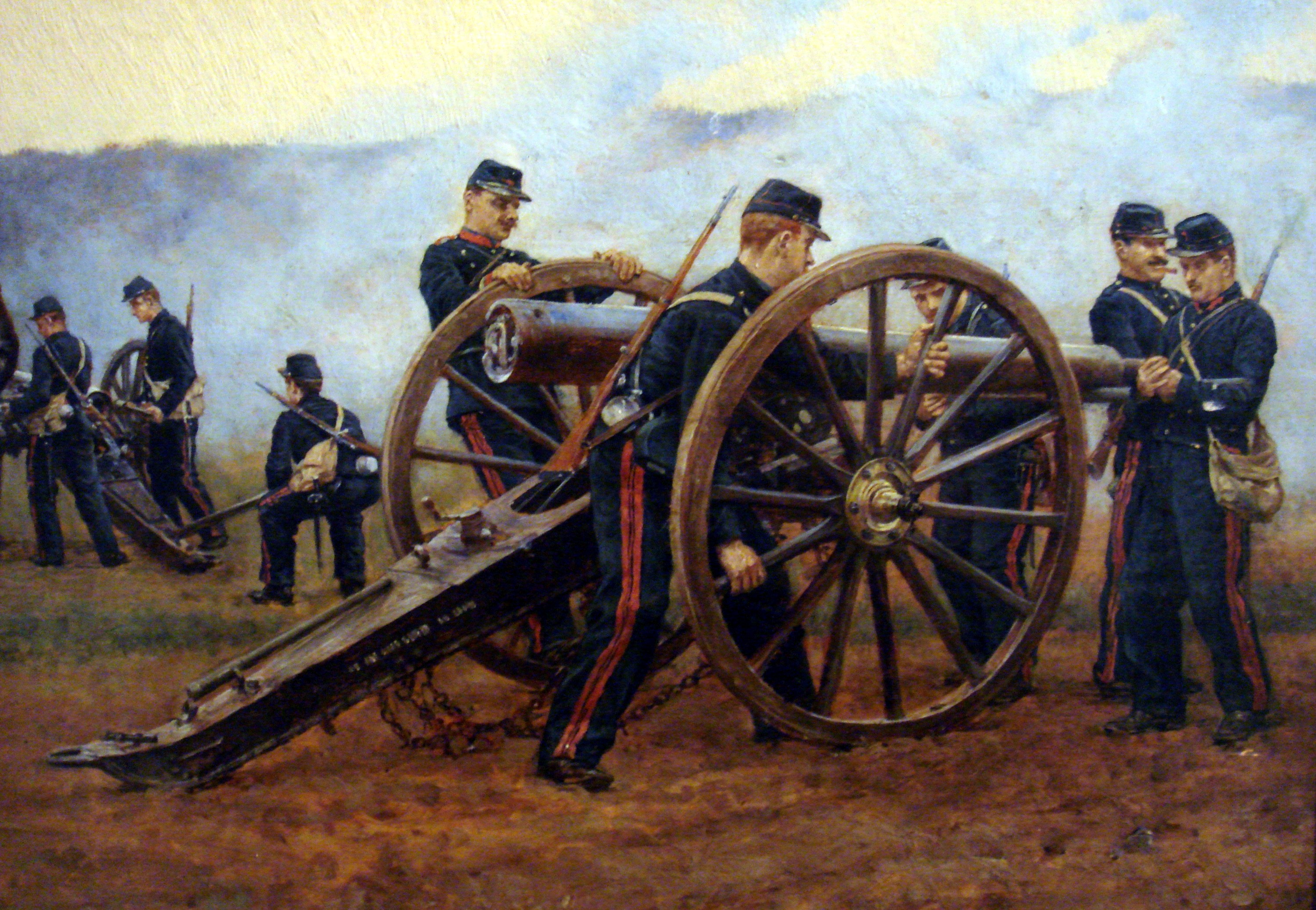
A 90mm de Bange artillery piece, in 1898. Painting by Etienne-Prosper Berne-Bellecourt (1838–1910). Musée de l'Armée.

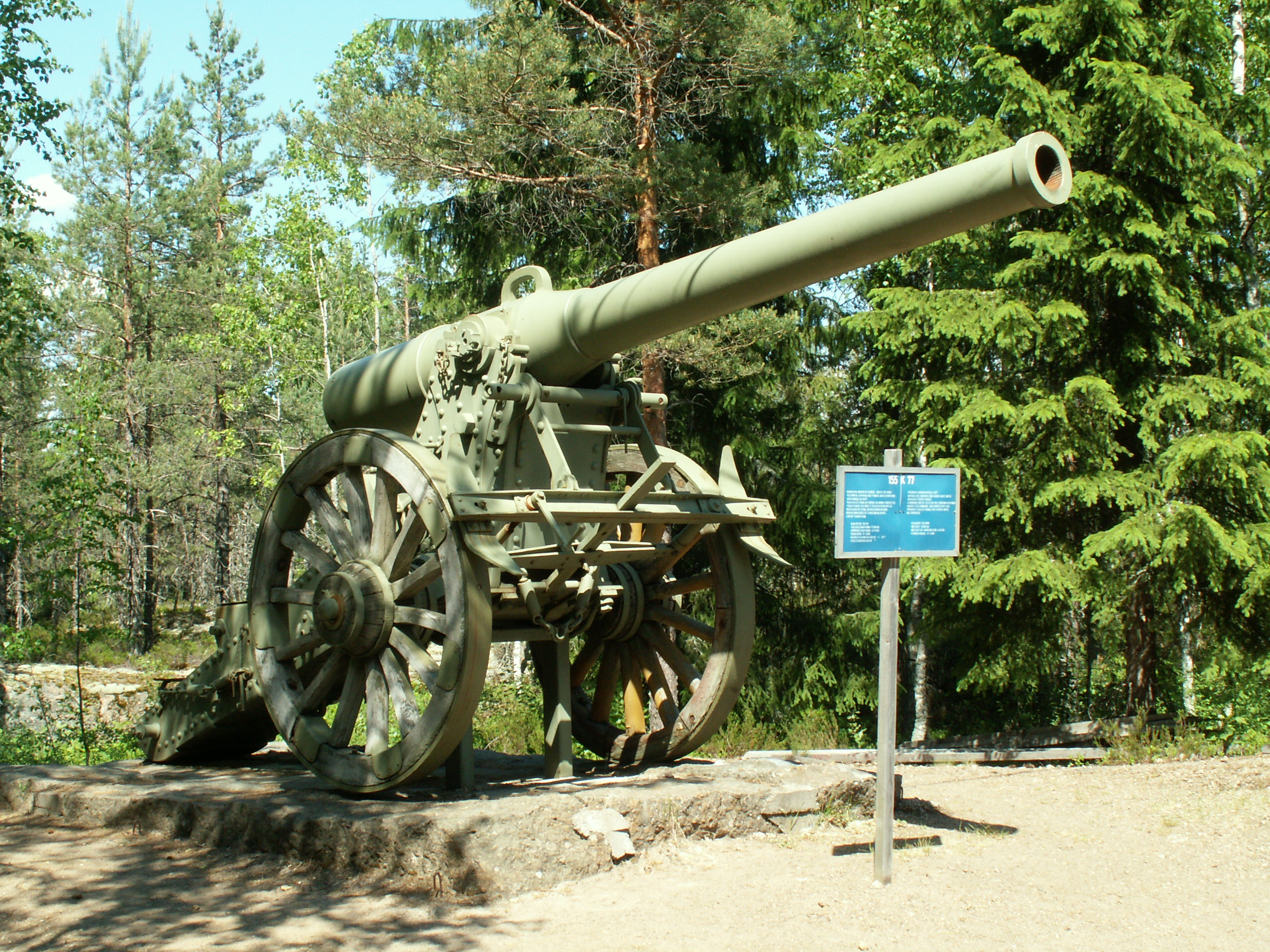
A 155 mm de Bange cannon (1877).

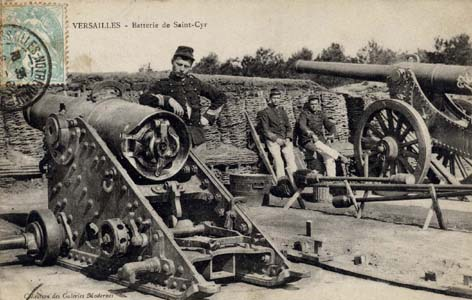
A 220 mm de Bange mortar battery.

In 1873, de Bange became Director of the "Atelier-de-précision" in the Central Depot in Paris (Paris arsenal's precision workshop), in order to redesign French light and heavy artillery.

Between 1877 and 1881, de Bange developed several artillery pieces, such as the De Bange 90 mm cannon (field artillery, 1877), the De Bange 80 mm cannon (mountain artillery, 1878), the De Bange 120 mm L cannon (siege artillery, 1878), De Bange 155 mm L cannon (siege artillery, 1877), De Bange 155 mm C howitzer (siege artillery, 1881), as well as mortars for siege warfare, such as the 1880 De Bange 220 mm mortar, 1885 De Bange 270 mm and coastal batteries such as the De Bange 240 mm and De Bange 270 mm. Several of these weapons were used during the colonial wars of the end of the 19th century, during the First World War and also sometimes during the Second World War. As with other cannons, the de Bange cannons had the disadvantage of being slow to fire, as they were affected by recoil, and thus had to be re-aimed after every shot. This inconvenience would be solved with the appearance of the famous Canon de 75, that had a hydro-pneumatic recoil mechanism, which kept the gun's trail and wheels perfectly still during the firing sequence. However, there were two howitzers the Obusier de 120 mm C modèle 1890 and Obusier de 155 mm C modèle 1890 with de Bange breeches and recoil mechanisms designed by Captain Louis Henry Auguste Baquet. From 1882 to 1889, de Bange was Director of the Cail Manufacturing Corporation (Société Anonyme des Anciens Etablissements Cail), the forerunner of the Société française de constructions mécaniques, where he worked on weapon design and trade, selling guns to such countries as Serbia.

A street is named after him (Rue du Colonel de Bange) in the city of Versailles.

== See also ==
- Cannons
- Shells
- Canet guns
- Nominative determinism

== Gallery ==
=== De Bange 155 mm cannon (1877) ===
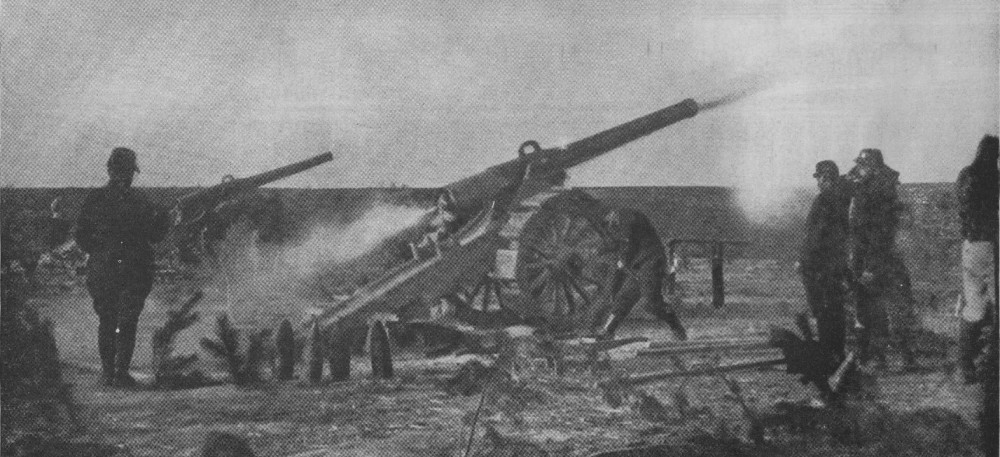

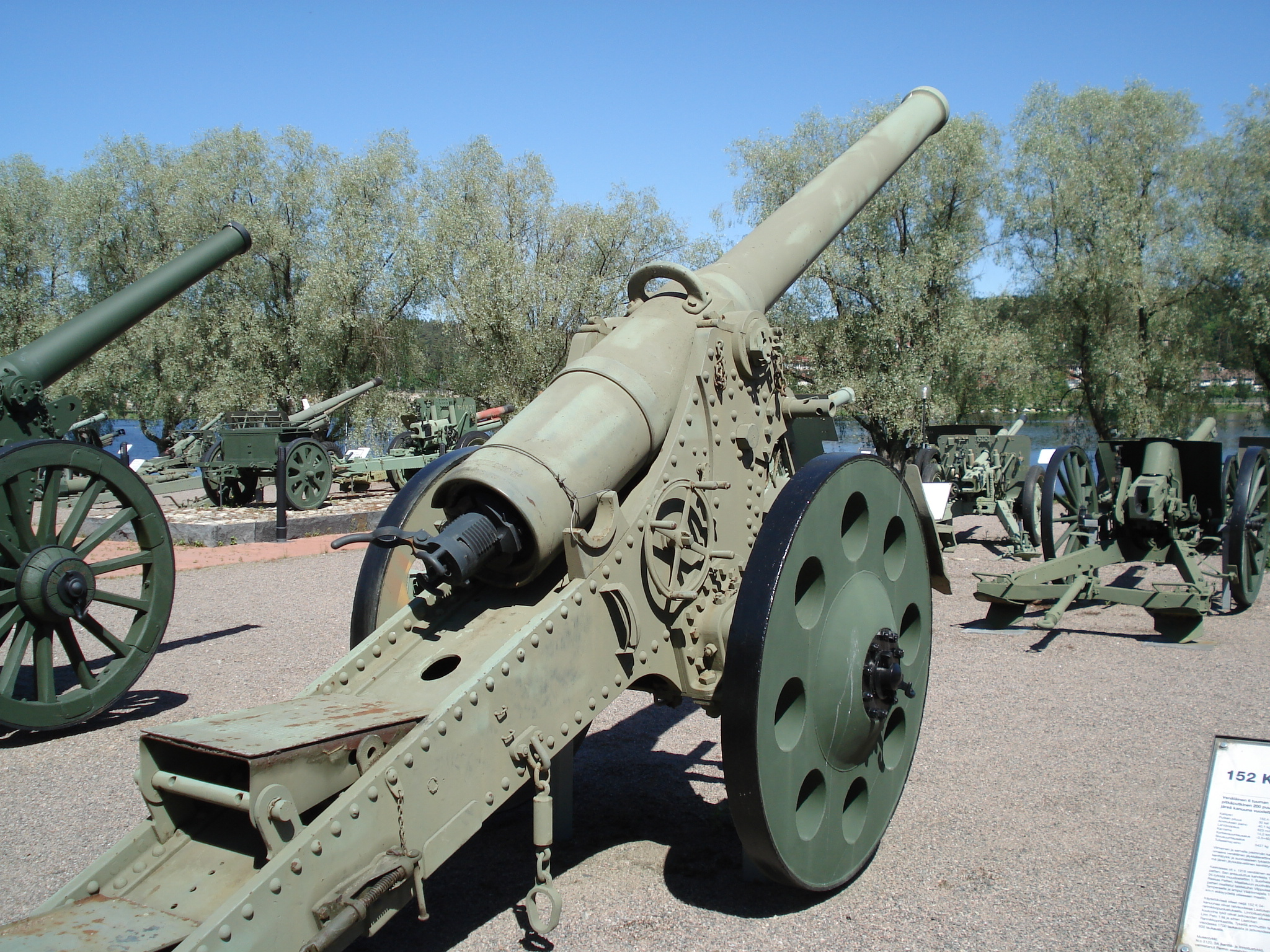

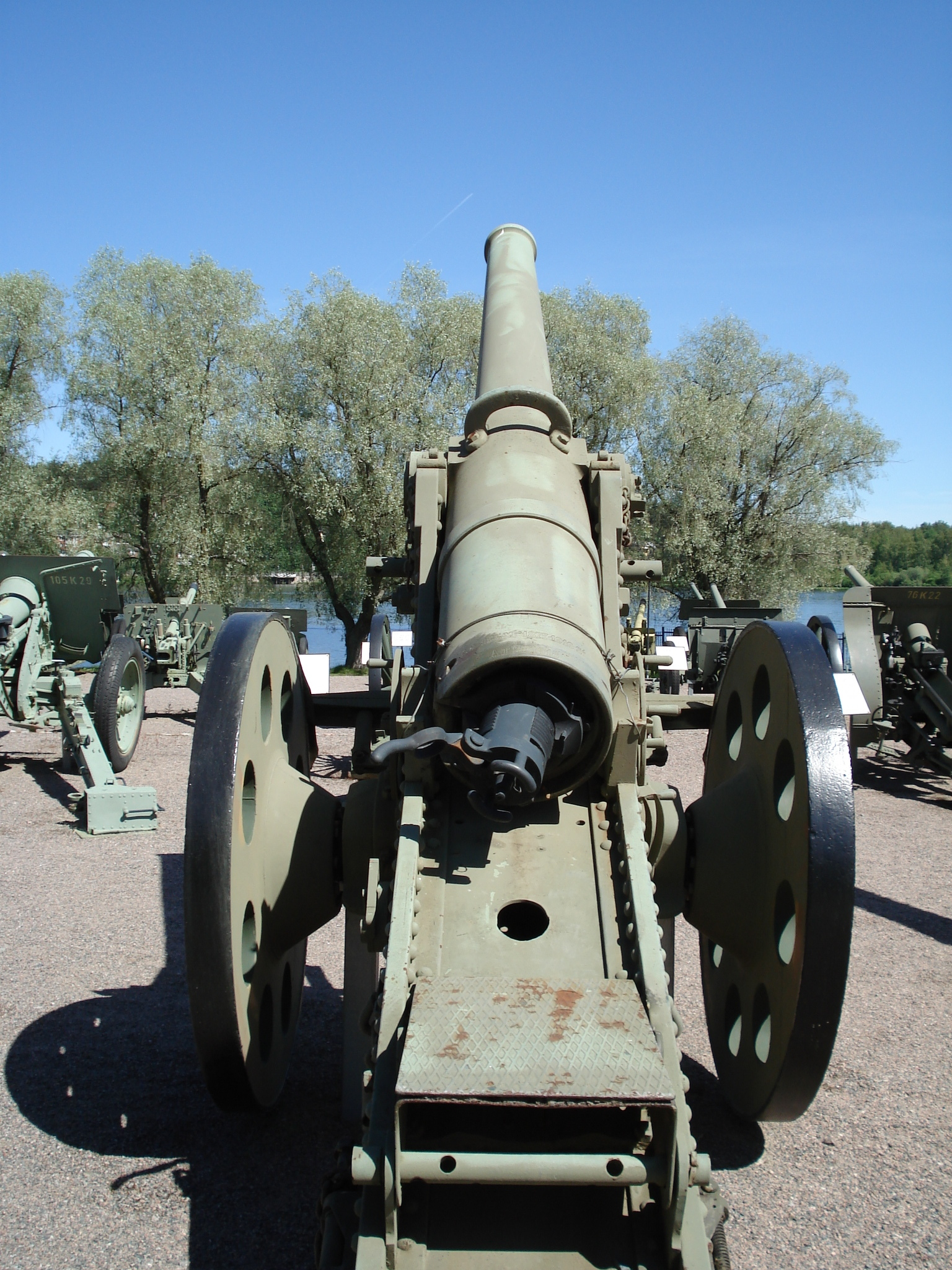

=== De Bange 220 mm mortar (1880) ===
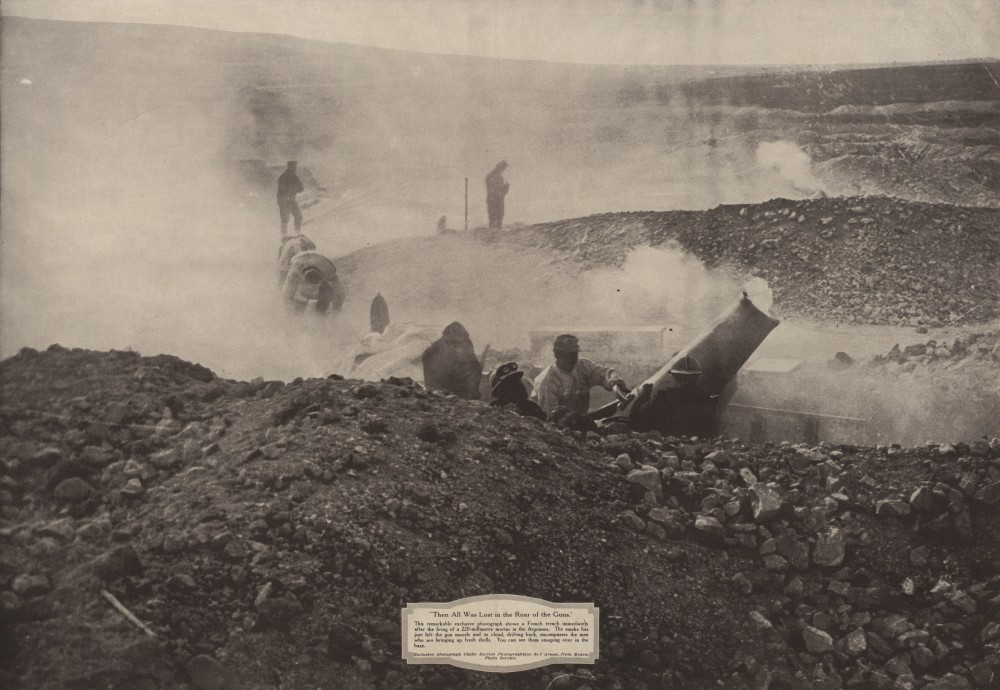

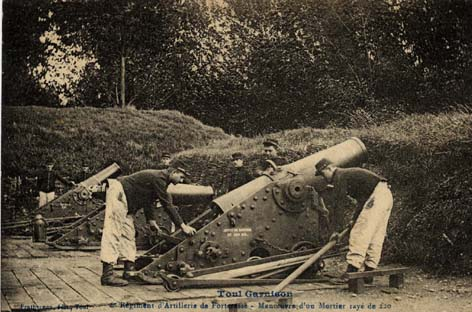

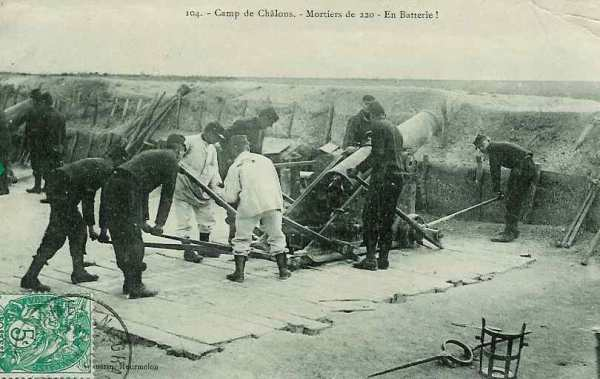

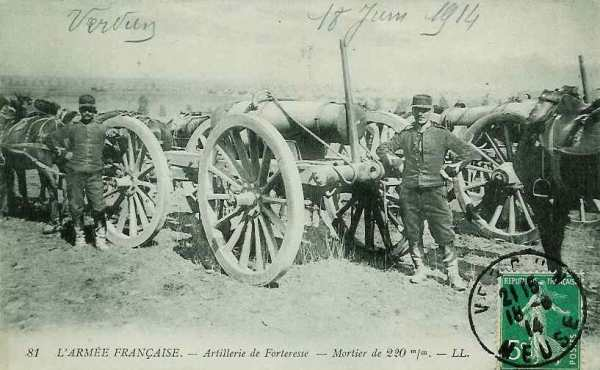
