= 28 cm Haubitze L/12 =

World War-era German coastal and siege howitzer

- Type: Coastal Artillery; Heavy Siege Howitzer
- Place of origin: Germany

Service history
- In service: 1892–1945
- Used by: German Empire; Nazi Germany; Portugal
- Wars: World War I World War II

Production history
- Designer: Krupp
- Manufacturer: Krupp

Specifications
- Mass: 50.3 tonnes (49.5 long tons; 55.4 short tons)
- Barrel length: 3.39 m (11.1 ft) L/12
- Shell: Separate loading bagged charge and projectile
- Shell weight: 215–345 kg (474–761 lb)
- Caliber: 283 mm (11.1 in)
- Breech: Horizontal sliding-block
- Recoil: Hydro-gravity
- Elevation: 0° to +70°
- Traverse: 360°
- Rate of fire: 1 round per 4 minutes
- Muzzle velocity: 379–425 m/s (1,240–1,390 ft/s)
- Effective firing range: 9.9 km (6.2 mi)
- Maximum firing range: 10.4 km (6.5 mi)

The 28 cm Haubitze L/12 was a German coastal defense and siege howitzer. Developed by Krupp before World War I that saw service in both World War I and World War II.

== Description ==
The 28 cm Haubitze L/12 in Mittelpivotlafette C/92 was a design of the late 19th century initially intended for coastal defense. The theory of operation was a low-velocity howitzer firing a large shell at a high angle was more likely to destroy an enemy ship by penetrating its thin deck armor than a high-velocity low-angle gun attempting to penetrate its thicker belt armor. The downside was that high-angle fire was harder to aim correctly so more howitzers would be needed to defend an area from attack. However, if the area was constrained by geography like a port at the mouth of a river the navigation channels could be measured ahead of time and firing ranges calculated. A complicating factor was as naval artillery progressed their size and range soon eclipsed its range.

In the coastal defense role it was mounted on a large geared circular base that was set in concrete. There was also a 60-millimetre-thick (2.4 in) armored dome to protect the gun crew. Recoil forces were absorbed by a combination of the gun cradle moving up an inclined plane and two hydro-pneumatic or hydro-spring recuperator cylinders, one on each side of the carriage. It fired a 215–345 kg (474–761 lb) high-explosive shell to a range of 10.4 km (6.5 mi) and was capable of penetrating 100 mm (3.9 in) of deck armor at an angle of 63° at 9.9 km (6.2 mi). The guns had an early form of the Krupp sliding block breech and used separate loading bagged charge and projectiles.

In the siege howitzer role it could be broken down into four loads: the barrel, cradle, turntable and firing platform, each carried by a three-axle trailer. It was mounted on a turntable which was fixed to a wooden firing platform and required three to four days to emplace for firing. An ammunition crane was fixed to the carriage for ease of loading.

== Combat history ==
=== World War I ===
During the First World War there was a four-gun battery at the Bismark fortress that participated in the defense of the German colony of Tsingtao during the Siege of Tsingtao in 1914. A four gun battery was also moved from the German port of Wilhelmshaven to Blankenberge in Belgium to defend against an allied seaborne invasion.

Prior to the Great War, in 1902, the Portuguese monarchy bought several 28cm Krupp howitzers for equipping coastal artillery batteries at the mouth of the river Tagus, serving as the main defensive guns for Lisbon's harbor. There were in total four batteries, two on the northern margin and two on the southern margin of the river. Despite operating on a 24-hour basis during the Great War, these batteries were not capable of shooting at night, relying on other batteries of smaller-calibre artillery for defending the capital.

=== World War II ===
Supposedly it saw action in the assault on Sevastopol in 1942 under the command of 11th Army of Army Group South, but this has not been confirmed. In a personal photo album, owned by former Mountain Troops general Gheorghe Manoliu, commander of the 4th Mountain Division, a piece of artillery that seems to be a Haubitze L/12 was identified in a picture taken during the battle for Sevastopol.

== Weapons of similar era and performance ==
- 12-inch coast defense mortar - A US coastal defense mortar.
- 28 cm howitzer L/10 - A Japanese coastal defense howitzer based on an Armstrong design.
- Mortier de 270 mm modèle 1889 - A French coastal defense mortar
- Obice da 280 - An Italian coastal defense howitzer based on an Armstrong design.

== Photo gallery ==
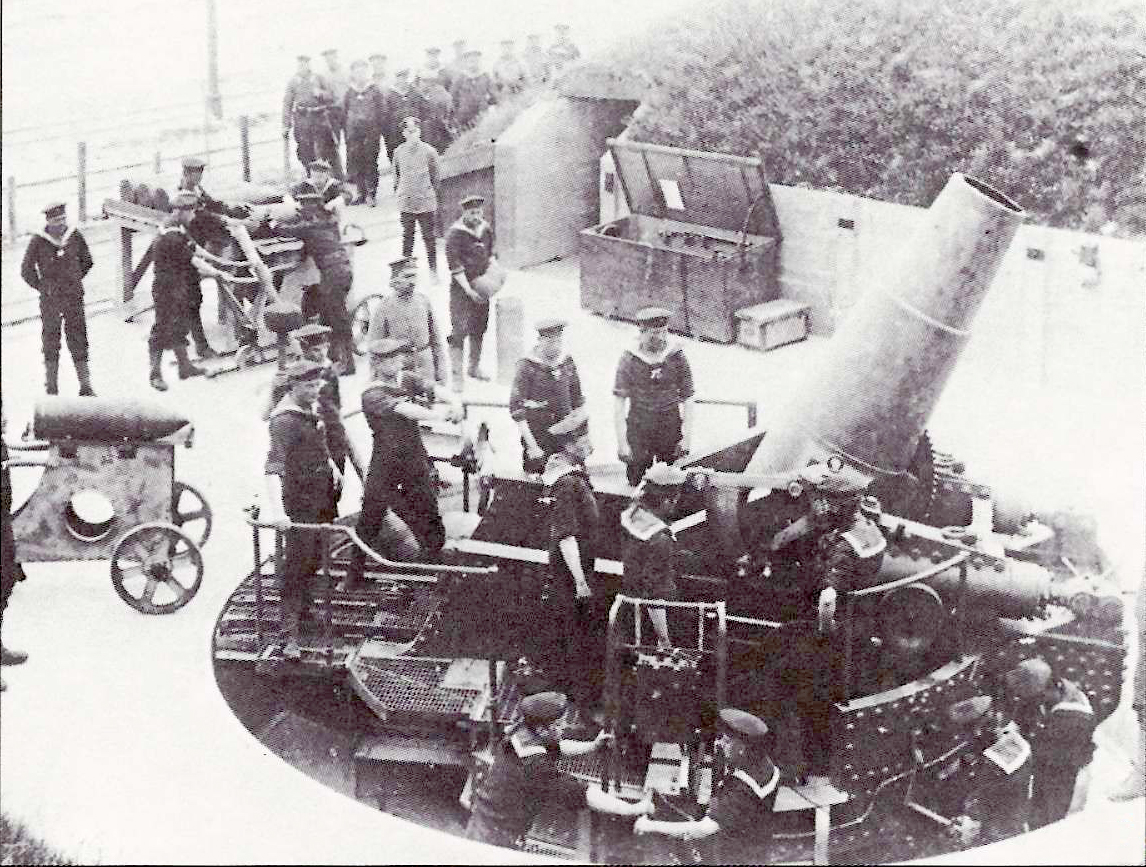
28-cm-Küstenhaubitze L-12 (coastal howitzer)

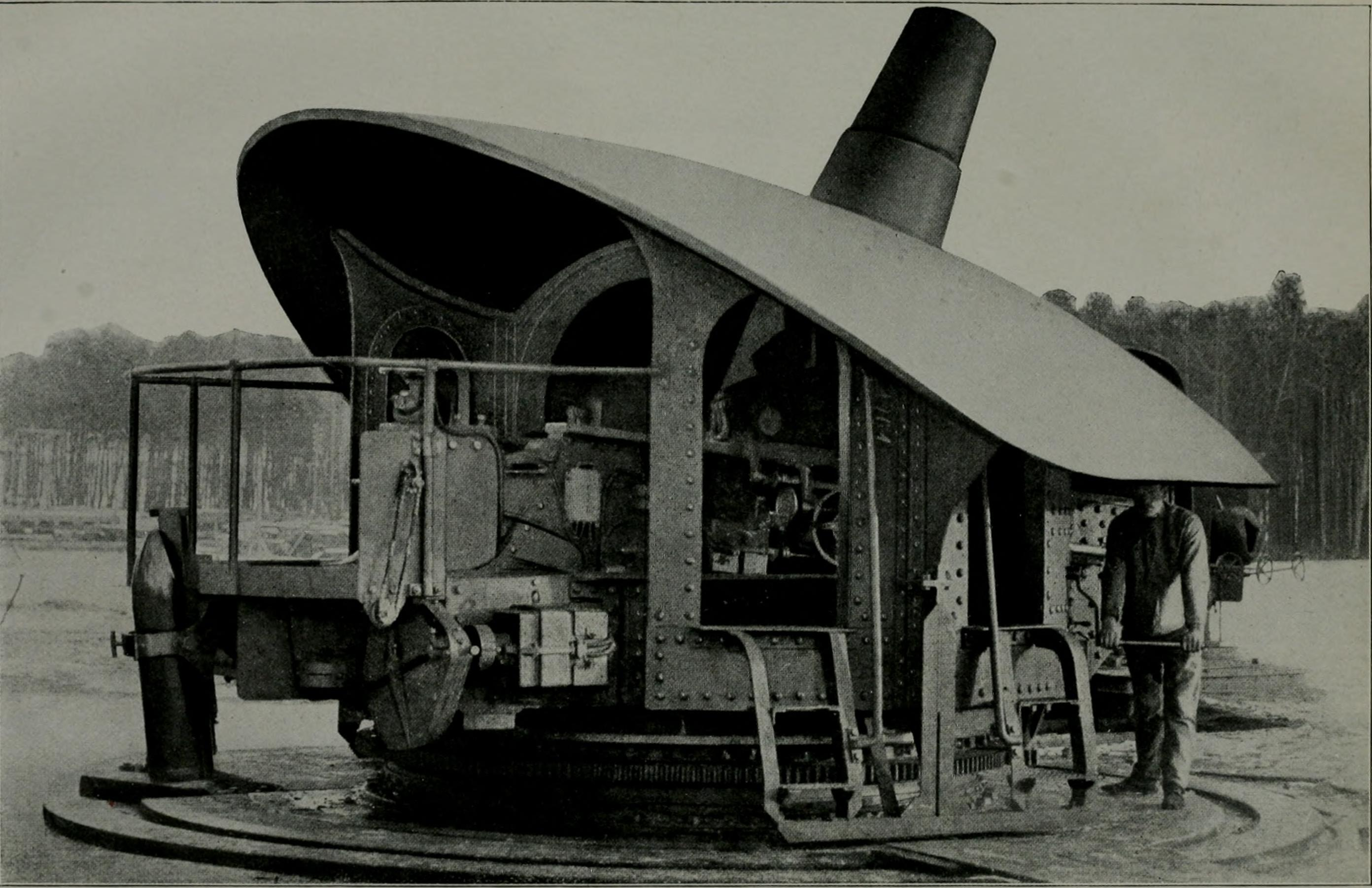
A picture of a coastal howitzer from encyclopedia britannica 1910.

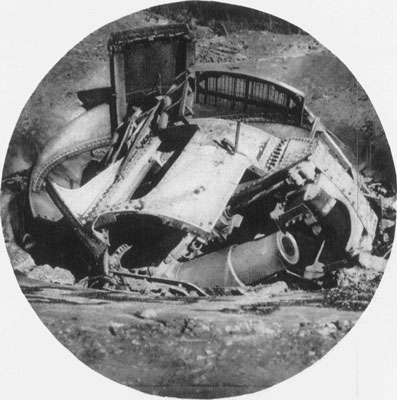
One of the four 28 cm coastal howitzers at fort Bismarck Tsingtao.

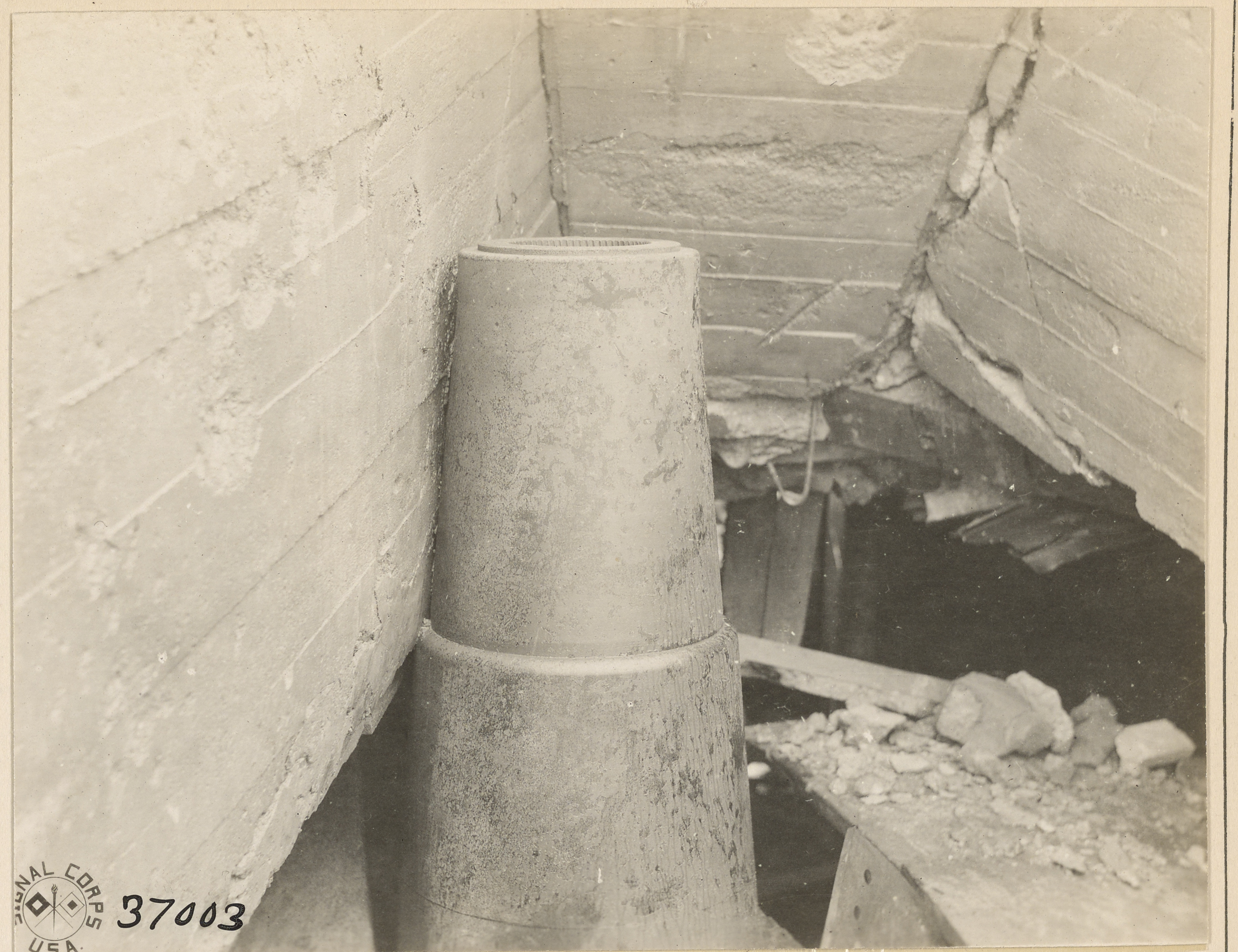
One of the Blankenberge howitzers sabotaged by the retreating Germans.
