= Hoop gun =

Gun production technique

A hoop gun is a gun production technique that uses multiple layers of tubes to form a built-up gun. The innermost tube has one or more extra tubes wrapped around the main tube. These outer tubes are preheated before they are slid into position. As the outer tubes cool they naturally contract. This pre-stresses the main tube so it can withstand greater internal pressures.
