= 120 mm Armata wz. 78/09/31 =

120 mm Armata wz. 78/09/31 120 mm Armata wz. 78/10/31
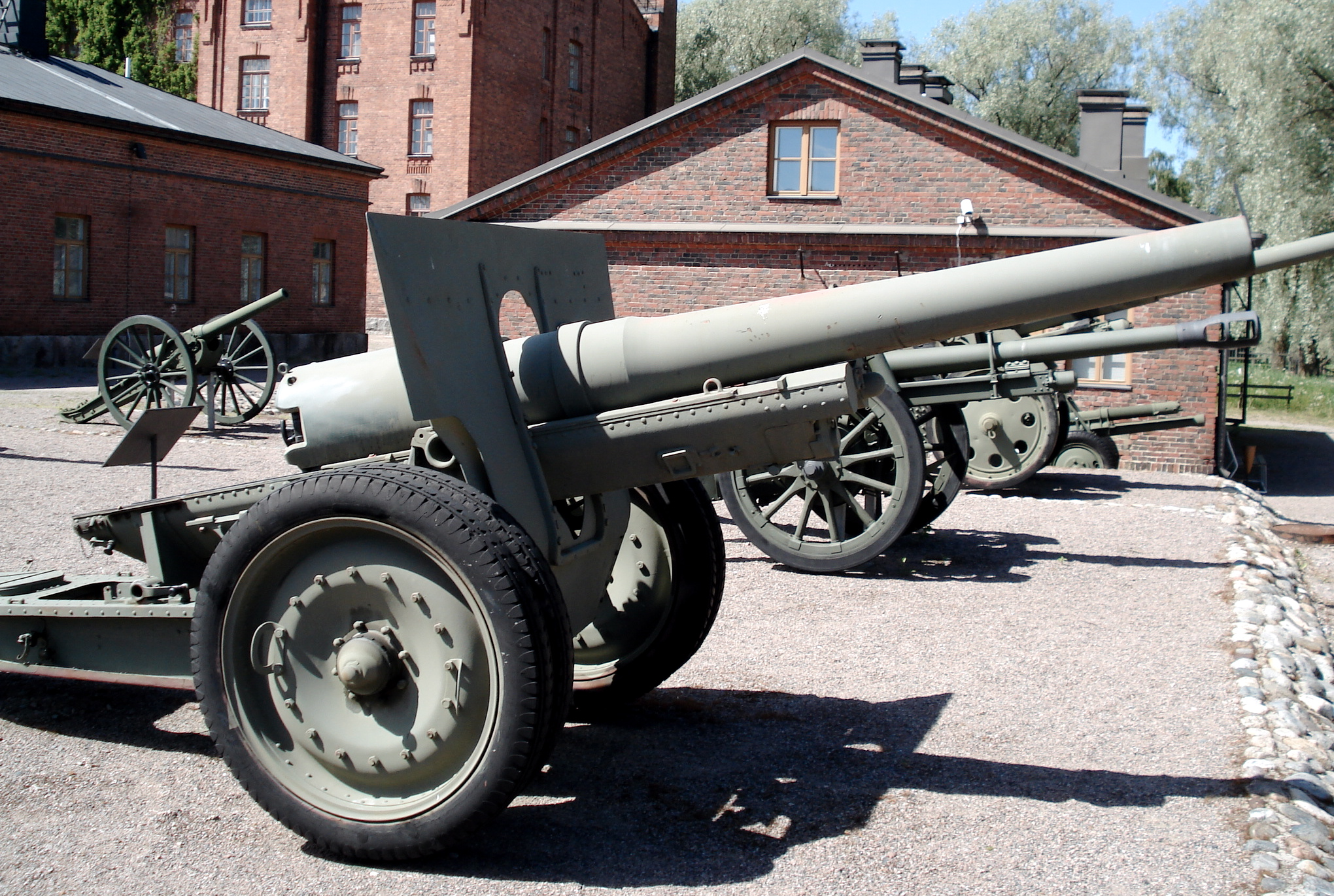
- A Polish 120 mm Armata wz. 78/10/31 at the Hämeenlinna Artillery Museum, Finland.
- Type: Field gun
- Place of origin: French gun barrel Russian carriage

Service history
- Used by: Poland; Finland
- Wars: Continuation War; World War II

Production history
- Designer: Gun barrel: Charles Ragon de Bange; Carriage: Schneider-Creusot
- Designed: 1931
- Manufacturer: Gun barrel: Atelier de précision Paris; Carriage: Putilov Plant and Perm plant Assembled: Starachowice Works
- No. built: 42

Specifications
- Mass: Combat: 3,140 kg (6,920 lb); Travel: 3,500 kg (7,700 lb)
- Length: 6.97 m (22 ft 10 in)
- Barrel length: 3.24 m (10 ft 8 in) L/27
- Width: 1.53 m (5 ft)
- Height: 1.47 m (4 ft 10 in)
- Crew: 9
- Shell: Separate loading bagged charges and projectile
- Shell weight: 18.9 kg (42 lb) HE, Shrapnel
- Caliber: 120 mm (4.7 in)
- Breech: de Bange
- Recoil: Hydro-pneumatic
- Carriage: Box trail
- Elevation: 0° to +40°
- Traverse: 3°
- Rate of fire: 2-3 rpm
- Muzzle velocity: 604 m/s (1,980 ft/s)
- Maximum firing range: 12.2 km (7.6 mi)

The 120 mm Armata wz. 78/09/31 and 120 mm Armata wz. 78/10/31 were field guns produced and used by Poland during World War II and Finland during the Continuation War.

== History ==
After the defeat of the Central Powers during World War I the Allies agreed to reconstitute the country of Poland from the territory which had been partitioned by the German Empire, Austro-Hungarian Empire, and Russian Empire. The new armed forces of the Second Polish Republic inherited a mix of German, Russian and Austro-Hungarian weapons from its former occupiers. Poland also received French technical assistance and weapons to rebuild its armed forces after World War I. Large numbers of Russian weapons were also captured during the Polish-Soviet War when the Red Army was defeated after the Battle of Warsaw in 1920.

== Background ==
The 120 mm Armata wz. 78/09/31 and 120 mm Armata wz. 78/10/31 were a combination of the gun barrels from the Canon de 120 mm L mle 1878 field guns supplied by France and the carriages of the Russian 152 mm M1909 and 152 mm M1910 howitzers. The name of the guns signifies the dates of manufacture for each of the components used. 78 indicated the barrel was from 1878, 09 and 10 indicated the carriages came from either the M1909 and M1910, and 31 indicated the design was completed and construction began in 1931.

== Design ==
=== Cannon de 120 mm L mle 1878 ===
The mle 1878 was a breech loaded gun with a de Bange obturator and used separate loading bagged charges and projectiles. It had a box trail carriage, no gun shield, two wooden-spoked steel-rimmed wheels, an unsprung axle, and no recoil mechanism. The mle 1878 was lighter than its heavier brother the Canon de 155 mm L mle 1877. It had roughly the same range and rate of fire as the Canon 155 mm L mle 1877, but it fired a lighter projectile. The 120 mm L mle 1878 was classified as a siege et de place (stationary siege gun) in France's Séré de Rivières system of fortifications. In line with this mission, the carriage was tall because it was expected that its barrel would overhang a parapet and use its range to provide long-range, low-angle counter-battery fire against enemy artillery. Although an elderly weapon at the time of World War I, it was available in large numbers and its heavy projectile and long-range made it a useful weapon and many were still in use during World War II.

An early drawback of the gun was that it required considerable time to prepare a firing platform made of concrete or timbers before use. An external recoil cylinder was then bolted to the platform and connected to an eyelet on the bottom of the gun carriage. Without it, the gun had no recoil mechanism and when fired the gun rolled back onto a set of ramps behind the wheels and then slid back into position. Since it lacked a recoil mechanism it had to be levered into position and re-aimed after every shot, which was strenuous, time-consuming, and limited its rate of fire. The height of the gun also limited the rate of fire since a gun crew needed to lift an 18.9 kg (42 lb) projectile to shoulder height.

Another drawback of the mle 1878 was since its carriage was tall and narrow it was top-heavy and not designed to be mobile. It was found it had a tendency to sink in on soft ground and since it was designed to be pulled at low speed by a horse team its wooden-spoked steel-rimmed wheels and axle were too fragile to be towed at high speed by motor traction. An early modification to make the guns suitable for field use was the fitting of Bonagente grousers to the wheels to improve balance and reduce ground pressure on soft ground. A bonus was they slowed recoil and didn't require extensive site preparation to bring the guns into action. These factors made the mle 1878 unsuitable for anything other than static defense during World War II.

=== Schneider 152 mm M1909 & 152 mm M1910 ===
The M1909 and M1910 were ordered by the Imperial Russian Army in the wake of the Russian Empire's defeat during the Russo-Japanese War. The Russian Army was in the process of re-equipping with new weapons and at the time the Russian Armed Forces were heavily reliant upon French and German designs. The M1909 and M1910 were designed by the French company Schneider-Creusot and were produced in large numbers under license at the Putilov and Perm factories in Russia. The heavier M1909 was designated a kryepostnaya gaubitsa (fortress howitzer) while the lighter M1910 was designated a polevaya gaubitsa (field howitzer). The two howitzers had similar performance but differed in the arrangement of their recoil mechanisms and gun shields.

The M1909/1910 were conventional designs for their time. They had a box trail carriage with wooden-spoked steel-rimmed wheels, a gun shield to protect the crew, and a hydro-pneumatic recoil system mounted under the barrel. They had an interrupted screw breech with separate loading ammunition; the shell being loaded first followed by bagged charges in a brass cartridge case. The carriage had a hollow center section to allow the barrel to elevate from -3° to 45° and there was an integral loading tray near the breech. When World War I broke out the M1910 was the most modern howitzer design that France had so its carriage and recoil system were used on the Canon de 105 mle 1913, 107 mm gun M1910, Canon de 155 C mle 1917, and Obusier de 120 mm mle 15TR produced by Schneider-Creusot.

The advantage of the M1909/1910 over the mle 1878 was that its recoil mechanism allowed it to achieve a higher rate of fire because it took less time to re-aim. Also since the M1909/1910 was shorter than the mle 1878 and had an integral loading tray it was faster to load. The carriage of the M1909/1910 was also more durable than the mle 1878 carriage and that gave it better mobility. A disadvantage of the M1909/1910 was that it had a shorter range than the mle 1878 so it was vulnerable to counter-battery fire.

== Conversion Process ==
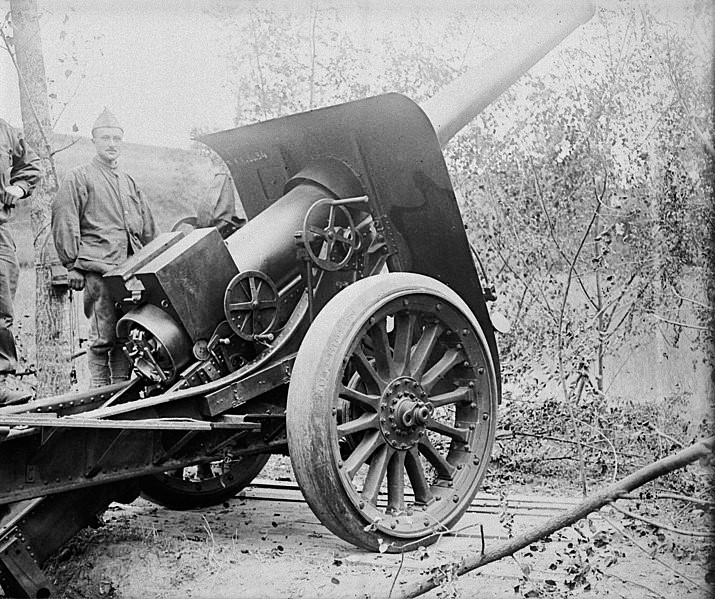
Of similar concept the barrel of the Canon de 155 mm L mle 1877 was combined with the carriage of a 152 mm howitzer M1910 to produce the French Canon de 155 L Modele 1917 Schneider of World War I.

In 1931 the Starachowice Works began converting the barrels and carriages to create the 120 mm Armata wz. 78/09/31 and 120 mm Armata wz. 78/10/31. It is estimated that 43 guns were modified at the Starachowice Works and delivered to the Polish Army. An advantage of the M1909/1910 was that the recoil mechanism was an integral part of the carriage and the barrel could be removed and transported on a separate wagon or could be pulled to the rear and fastened to the carriage to ease transport. This feature meant the carriage and recoil mechanism could be modified to accept longer or shorter barrels as well as barrels of greater diameter.

To mate the mle 1878 barrel to the M1909/1910 carriage the barrel was rotated 180 degrees so that the breech opened to the right instead of the left. The recoil mechanism also needed to be balanced to accommodate the new longer barrel. The chamber was also enlarged and strengthened to accept up to six propellant charges and the de Bange breech was modified to use modern primers. The carriage could either retain its original wooden-spoked steel-rimmed wheels for horse traction or it could be modified to use pneumatic tires and a sprung axle to allow for motor traction. Pneumatic tires and a sprung axle gave better traction on soft ground as well as increasing towing speed.

Like the 120 mm Armata wz. 78/09/31 and 120 mm Armata wz. 78/09/31 the M1909/1910's carriage and recoil mechanism were used to modernize the Canon de 155 mm L mle 1877 by placing the barrels from that gun on the M1910 carriage to produce the Canon de 155 L modèle 1877/14, Canon de 155 L modèle 1917 and Canon de 155 L modèle 1918 during World War I. By using the M1909/1910 carriage both the French and Polish were able to modernize existing 120 mm and 155 mm mle 1878 barrels to produce more mobile and long-ranged artillery pieces that utilized the large stockpiles of ammunition available for both types. By mating the mle 1897's barrel to the M1909/1910's carriage most of the faults of both guns could be resolved and provide an artillery piece with range superior to the modernized Soviet 122 mm howitzer M1910/30 and 152 mm howitzer M1909/30 and comparable to the newer 122 mm howitzer M1938 (M-30) and 152 mm howitzer M1938 (M-10).

== Users ==
=== Poland ===
In Polish service, the Cannon de 120 mm L mle 1878 was given the designation armata wz. 1878. The first Polish unit to use the wz. 1878 was General Józef Haller's Blue Army that was created in France in 1917. The Blue Army was given 48 wz. 1878's and were issued to two Heavy Artillery Regiments with four detachments. When World War I ended the Blue Army returned to Poland with their guns. After World War I Poland received more wz. 1878's and in 1931 54 guns were in Poland's inventory. Some had been modernized with a barrel that had been relined to use constant rifling instead of progressive rifling. The modified guns were designated wz.1878/16 in Polish Service.

In Polish service, a number of different styles of wheels were used to improve the mobility of the guns. Some retained wooden-spoked steel-rimmed wheels for horse traction while others were given pneumatic tires, sprung axles, and were towed by Citroën-Kegresse P14 or C4P half-track artillery tractors. In 1935 there were 32 wz.1878/09/31 guns and 6 wz.1878/10/31 guns in Poland's inventory. There were an additional 4 wz.1878/09/31 guns in reserve which lacked full equipment for a total of 42 guns. There were also 13 unconverted wz.1878 barrels in reserve.

In 1939 there were three Heavy Artillery Detachments with 12 guns each that were held in reserve. Of these three the 46th and 47th Heavy Artillery Detachment were horse-drawn while the 6th Heavy Artillery Detachment was motorized. All were active in the defense of Poland and they faced both German and Soviet units. After the Polish Campaign 24 of the surviving guns were sold to Finland.

=== Finland ===
Finland bought 24 guns and 46,200 rounds of ammunition from Germany in the autumn of 1940. The guns arrived in two shipments: 13 guns arrived on the Inga on the 2nd of October 1940 and the remaining 11 guns arrived on the Widor on the 9th of October 1940. In Finnish service, the unmodified Canon de 120 mm L mle 1878 was given the designation 120 K/78 and the new guns from Poland were given the designation 120 K/78-31. Since the 120 K/78 was already in service there was an adequate supply of ammunition for both. During the Continuation War, both guns were issued to four heavy artillery battalions. They gained a reputation of being durable and good quality artillery pieces, but the new primer system proved troublesome and the recoil system wasn't always reliable in cold weather. Two of the guns were lost during 1944 and After World War 2 the remaining guns were placed in reserve until they were retired during the 1960s.

== Gallery ==
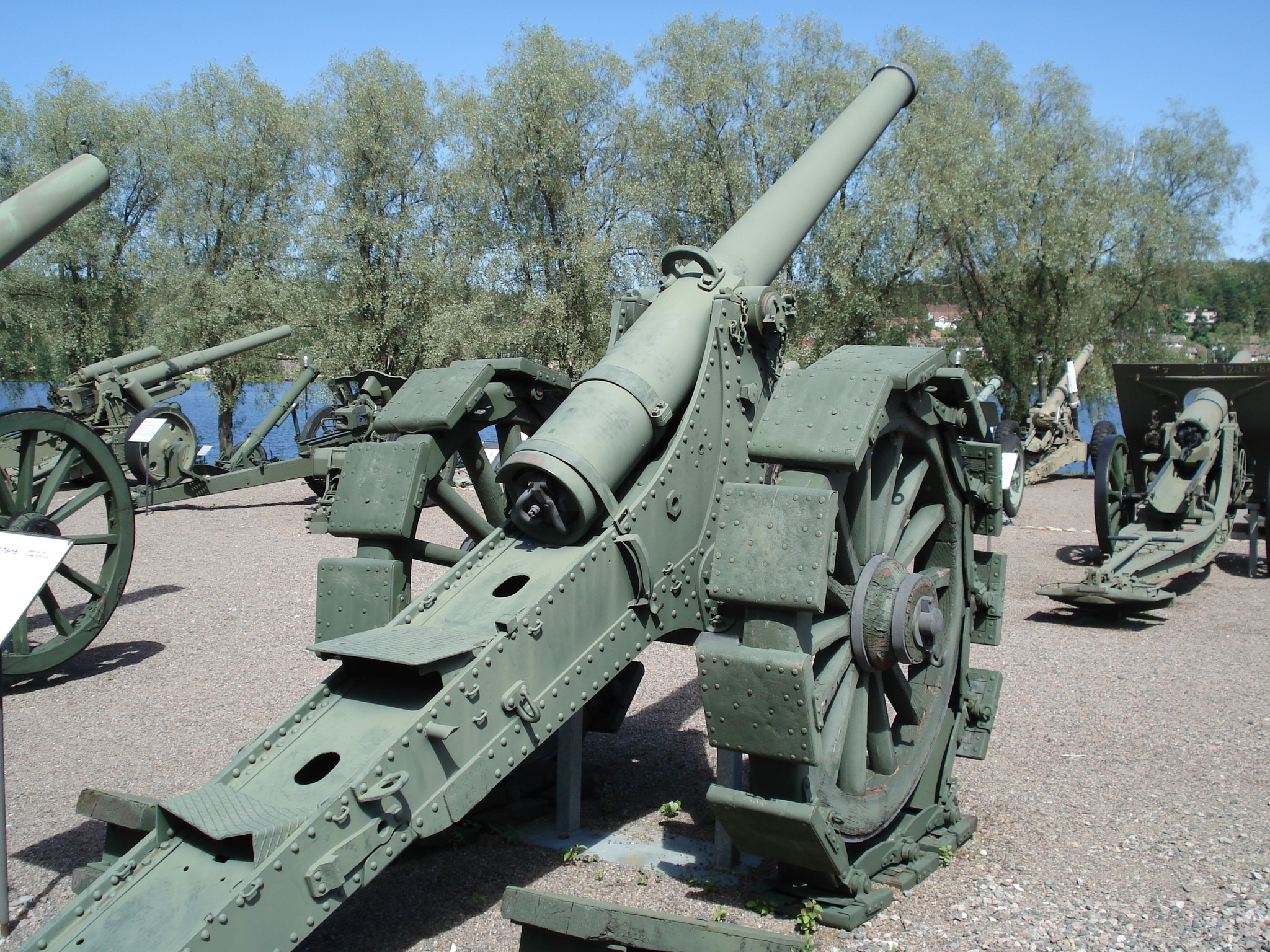
A French Cannon de 120 mm L mle 1878 with Bonagente groussers and ramps at the Hämeenlinna Artillery Museum.

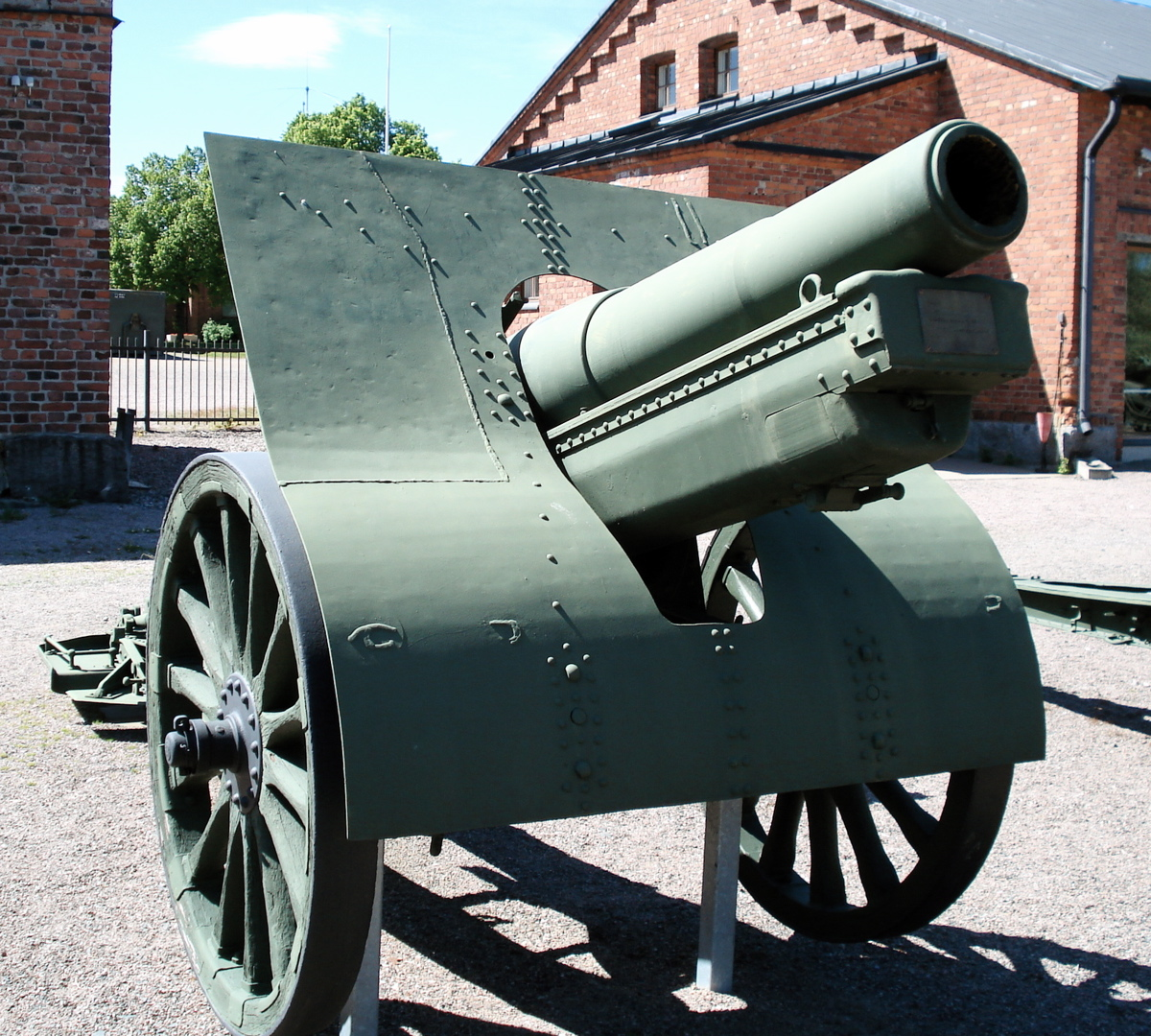
A modernized 152 mm fortress howitzer M1909/30 at the Hämeenlinna Artillery Museum.

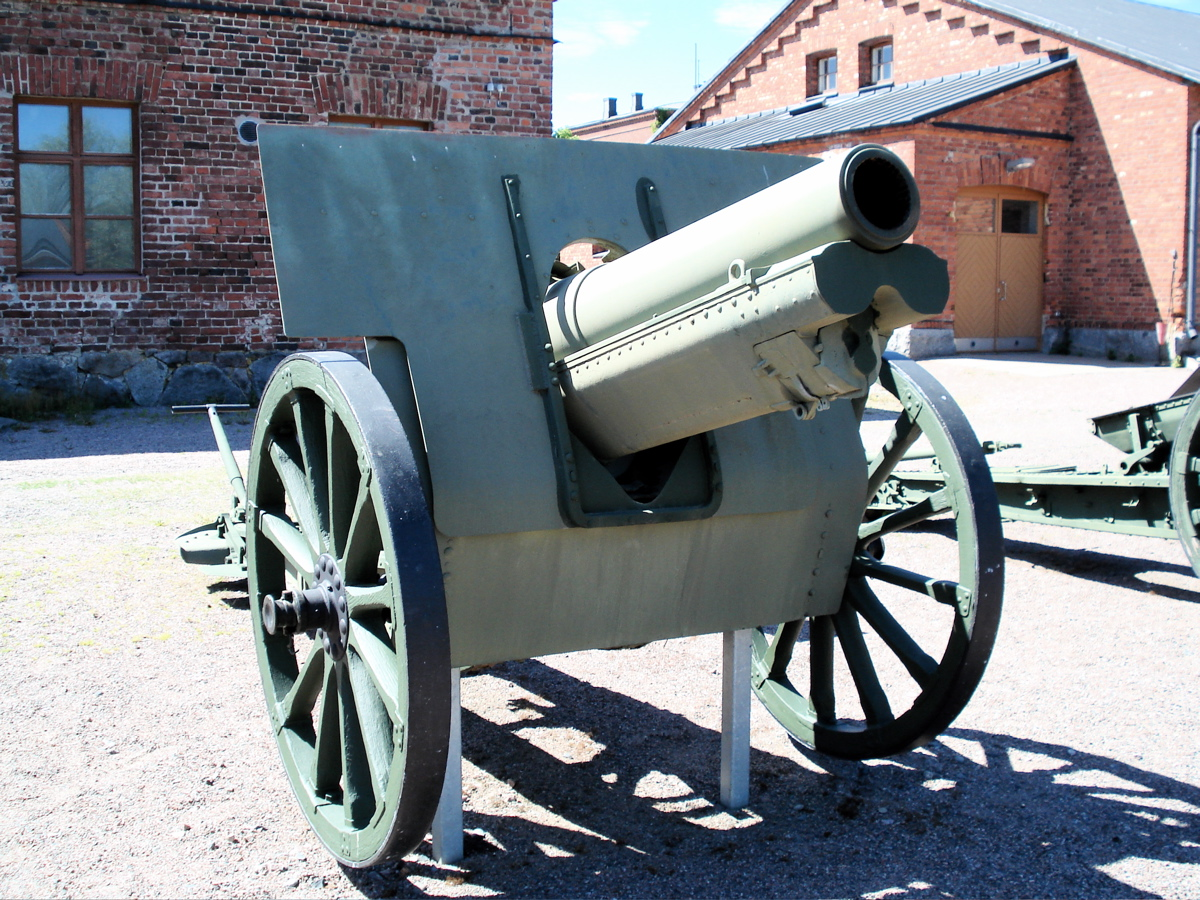
A modernized 152 mm field howitzer M1910/37 at the Hämeenlinna Artillery Museum.

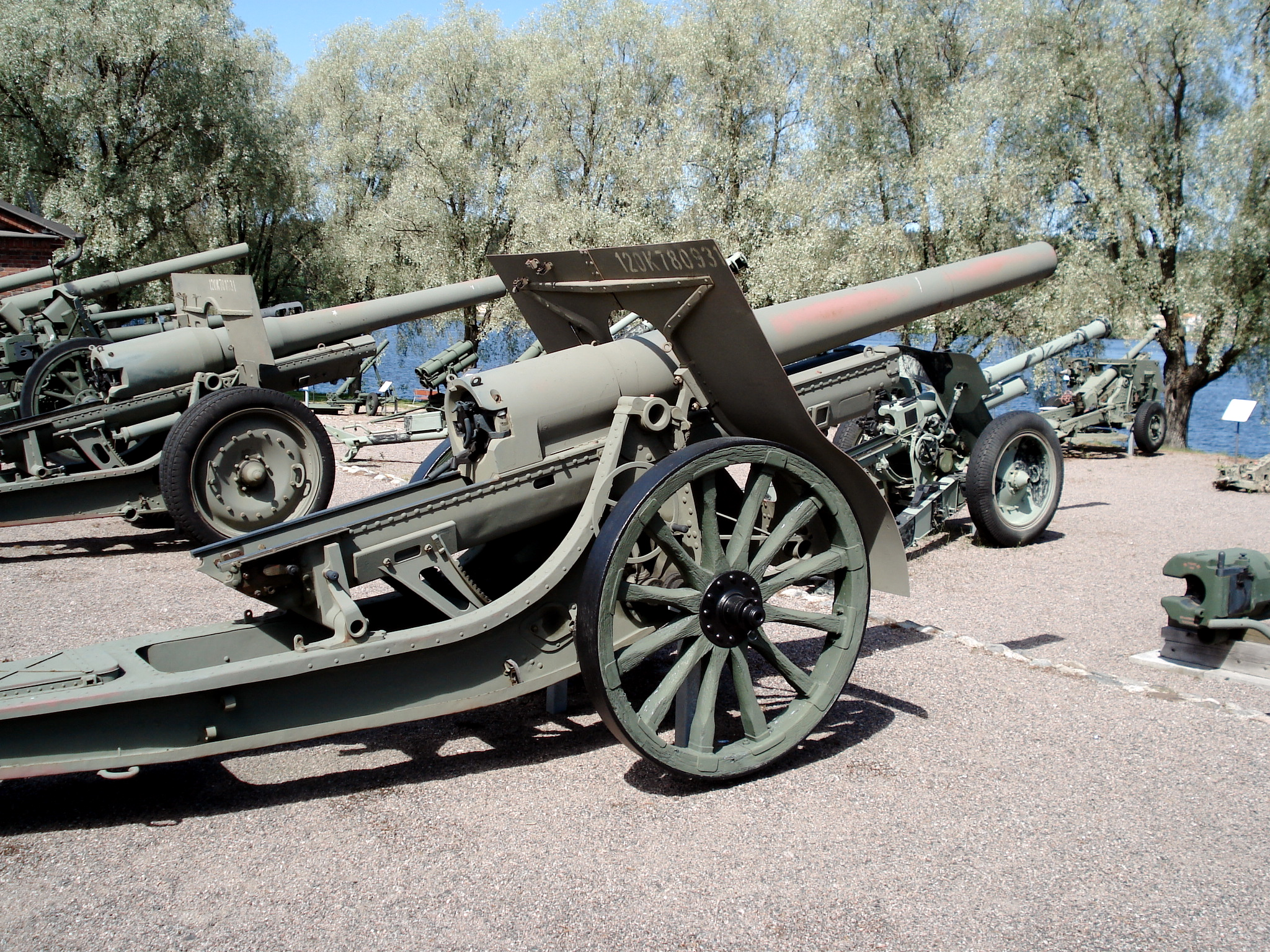
A 120 mm Armata wz. 78/09/31 with wooden wheels at the Hämeenlinna Artillery Museum.

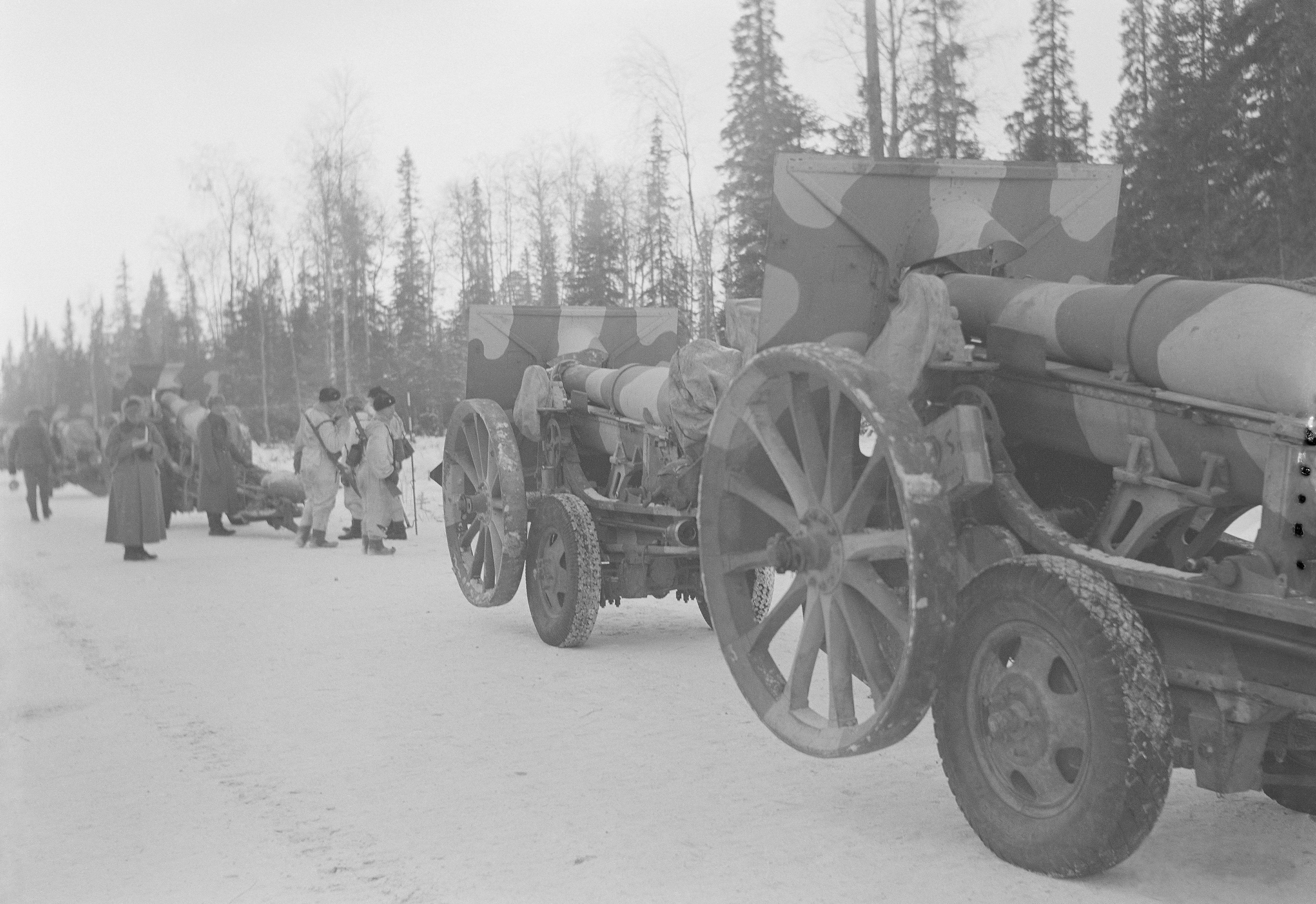
Finnish artillery in action near Murmansk.

== See also ==
- 75 mm Armata wz.02/26 - Another conversion carried out by the Starachowice Works.
- 105 mm Armata wz. 29 - A field gun built under license by the Starachowice Works.
