= Materiel de 155 sur affut-truck Schneider =

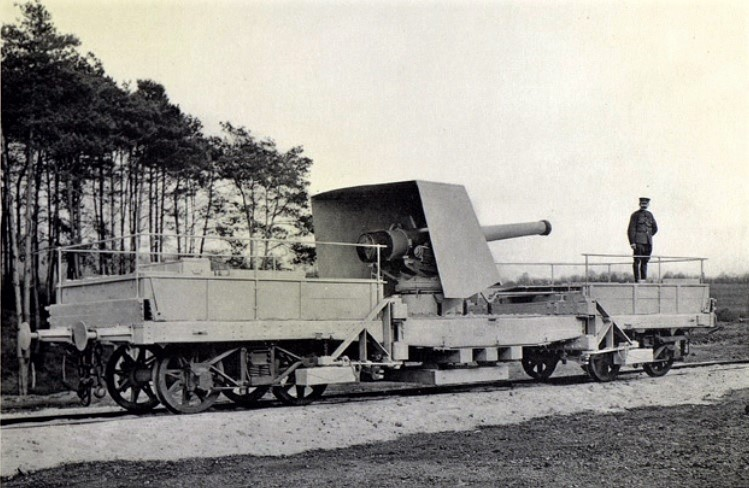
- Type: Railway gun
- Place of origin: France

Service history
- Used by: France
- Wars: World War I

Production history
- Designer: Schneider-Creusot
- No. built: 6

Specifications
- Mass: 44 t (43 long tons; 49 short tons)
- Barrel length: 4.2 m (14 ft) L/27
- Shell: Separate-loading, bagged charges, and projectiles
- Shell weight: 43 kg (95 lb)
- Caliber: 155 mm (6.1 in)
- Breech: de Bange
- Recoil: Top-carriage recoil
- Carriage: Top carriage traverse on 4-axle carriage
- Elevation: 0° to +35°
- Traverse: 360°
- Rate of fire: 1 rpm
- Muzzle velocity: 600 m/s (2,000 ft/s)
- Maximum firing range: 12.7 km (7.9 mi)

The Materiel de 155 sur affut-truck Schneider was a railway gun designed and built early in the First World War.

== History ==
Although the majority of combatants had heavy field artillery before the outbreak of the First World War, none had adequate numbers of heavy guns in service, nor had they foreseen the growing importance of heavy artillery once the Western Front stagnated and trench warfare set in. Since aircraft of the period were not yet capable of carrying large-diameter bombs the burden of delivering heavy firepower fell on the artillery. Two sources of heavy artillery suitable for conversion to field use were surplus coastal defense guns and naval guns.

However, a paradox faced artillery designers of the time; while large caliber naval guns were common, large caliber land weapons were not due to their weight, complexity, and lack of mobility. Large-caliber field guns often required extensive site preparation because the guns had to be broken down into multiple loads light enough to be towed by a horse team or the few traction engines of the time and then reassembled before use. Building a new gun could address the problem of disassembling, transporting, and reassembling a large gun, but it didn't necessarily address how to convert existing heavy weapons to make them more mobile. Rail transport proved to be the most practical solution because the problems of heavy weight, lack of mobility, and reduced setup time were addressed.

== Design ==
The Materiel de 155 sur affut-truck Schneider began life as six coastal defense guns based on the Canon de 155 L mle 1877 field gun converted by Schneider to railroad guns during the First World War. The 155 L had a hooped steel construction with gain-twist rifling. The guns had a de Bange breech and fired separate loading bagged charges and projectiles.

The guns sat on a Vavasseur mount with a gun shield which was bolted to a four-axle, well-base flatcar. The Vavasseur mount was a type of top-carriage recoil system where the gun sat on a cradle that held the trunnioned barrel. When fired a combination of hydraulic buffers and inclined rails returned the gun to position. Once in position, the timber firing platform under the center of the carriage was lowered onto the rails and the carriage was lifted by four jackscrews through the floor of the car. The combination of jackscrews, outriggers, and rail clamps stabilizing the carriage during firing. The gun was capable of 360° of traverse at elevations from +10° to +35° with a maximum range of 12.7 km (7.9 mi) and provided counter-battery fire during the Battle of Verdun.

== Photo Gallery ==
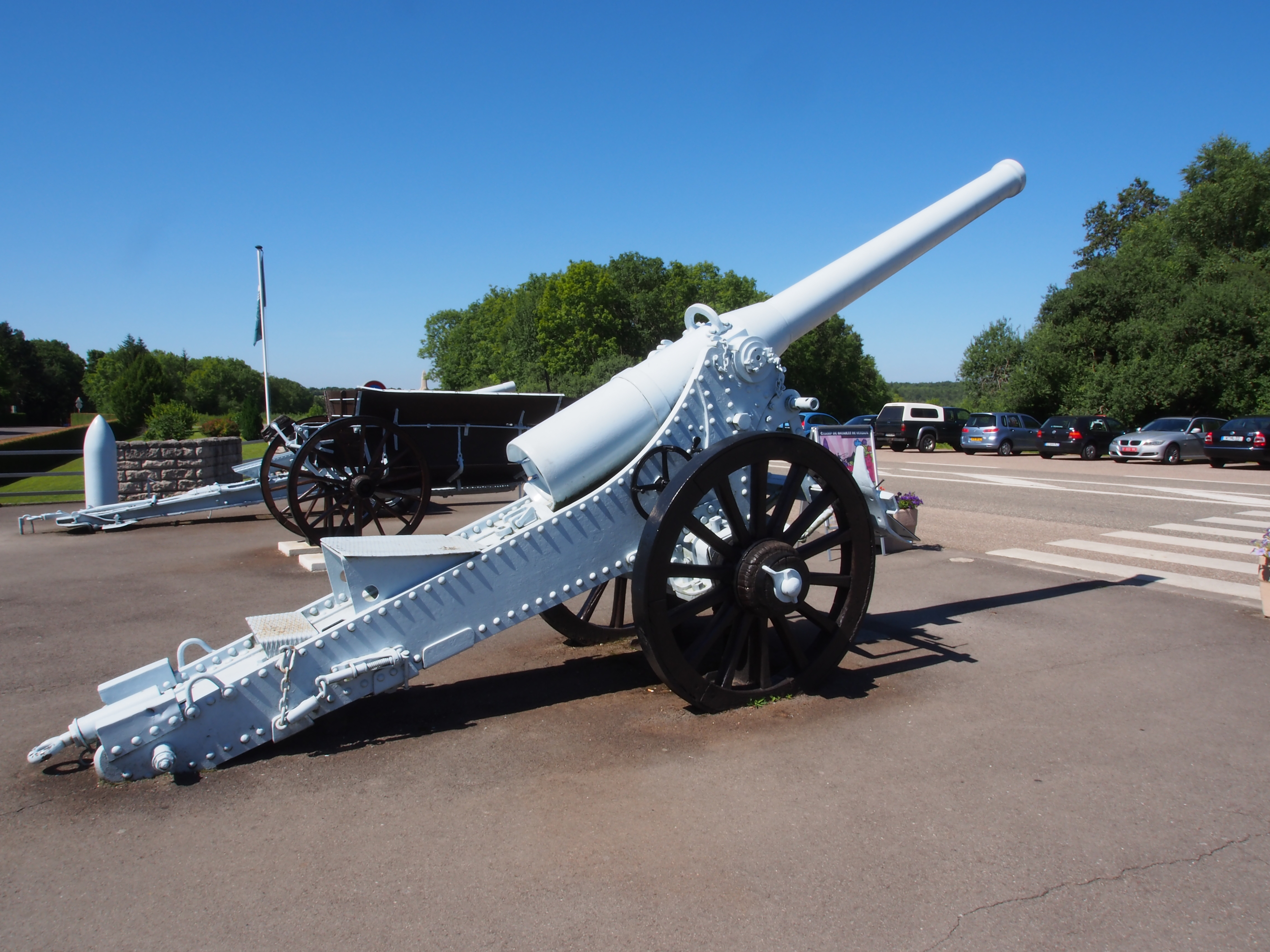
Canon de 155 L mle 1877.

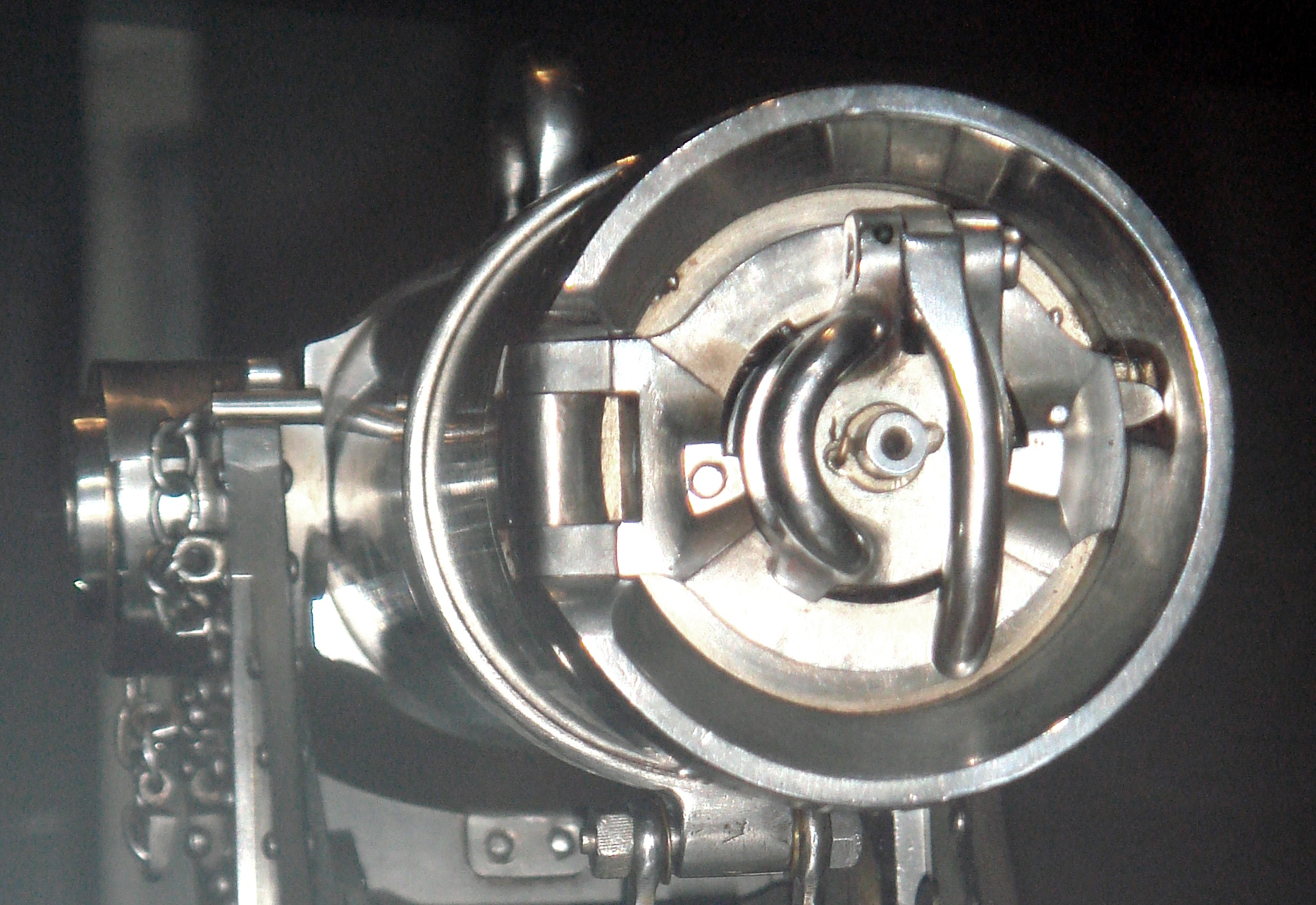
A closeup of the de Bange breech mechanism.

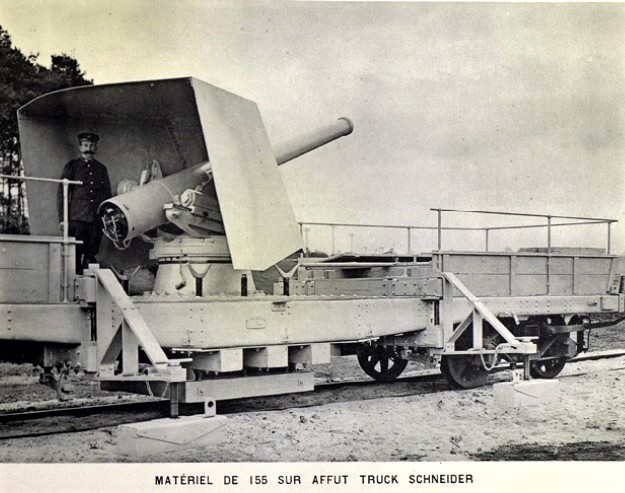
A gun with its firing platform lowered and outriggers extended.

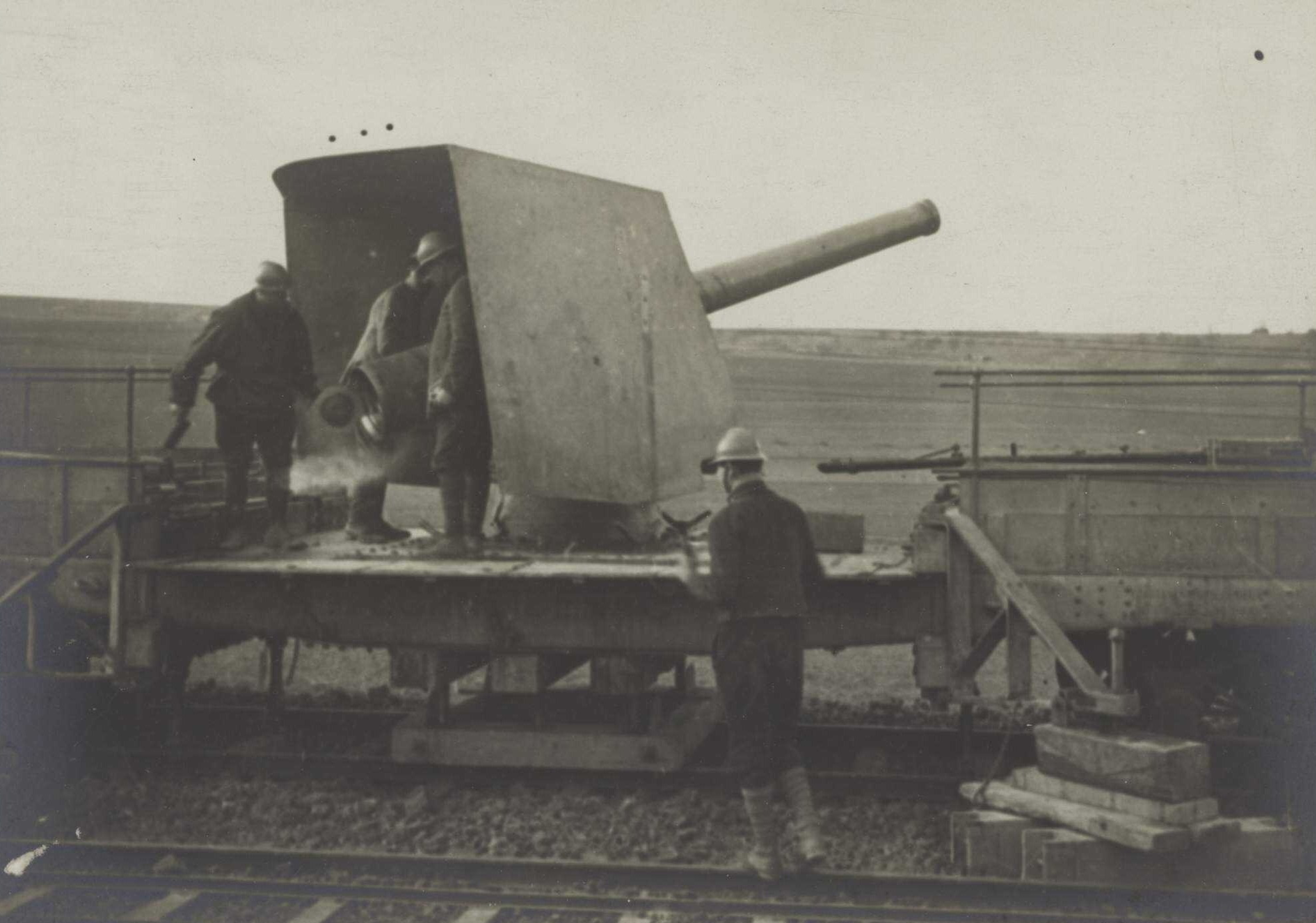
French artillery in action near Verdun.

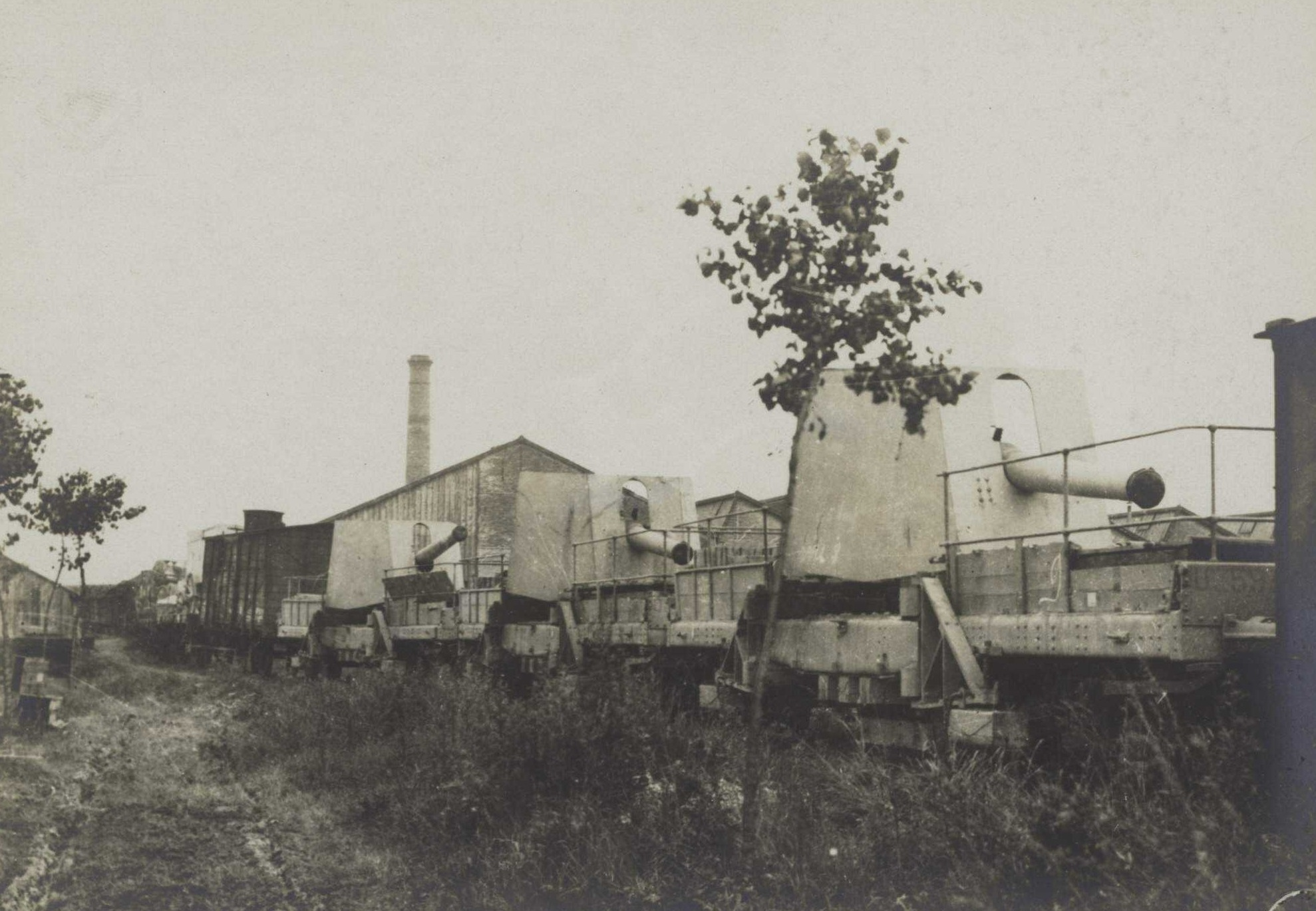
French artillery in action near Revigny.
