= Canon de 155 L modèle 1918 Schneider =

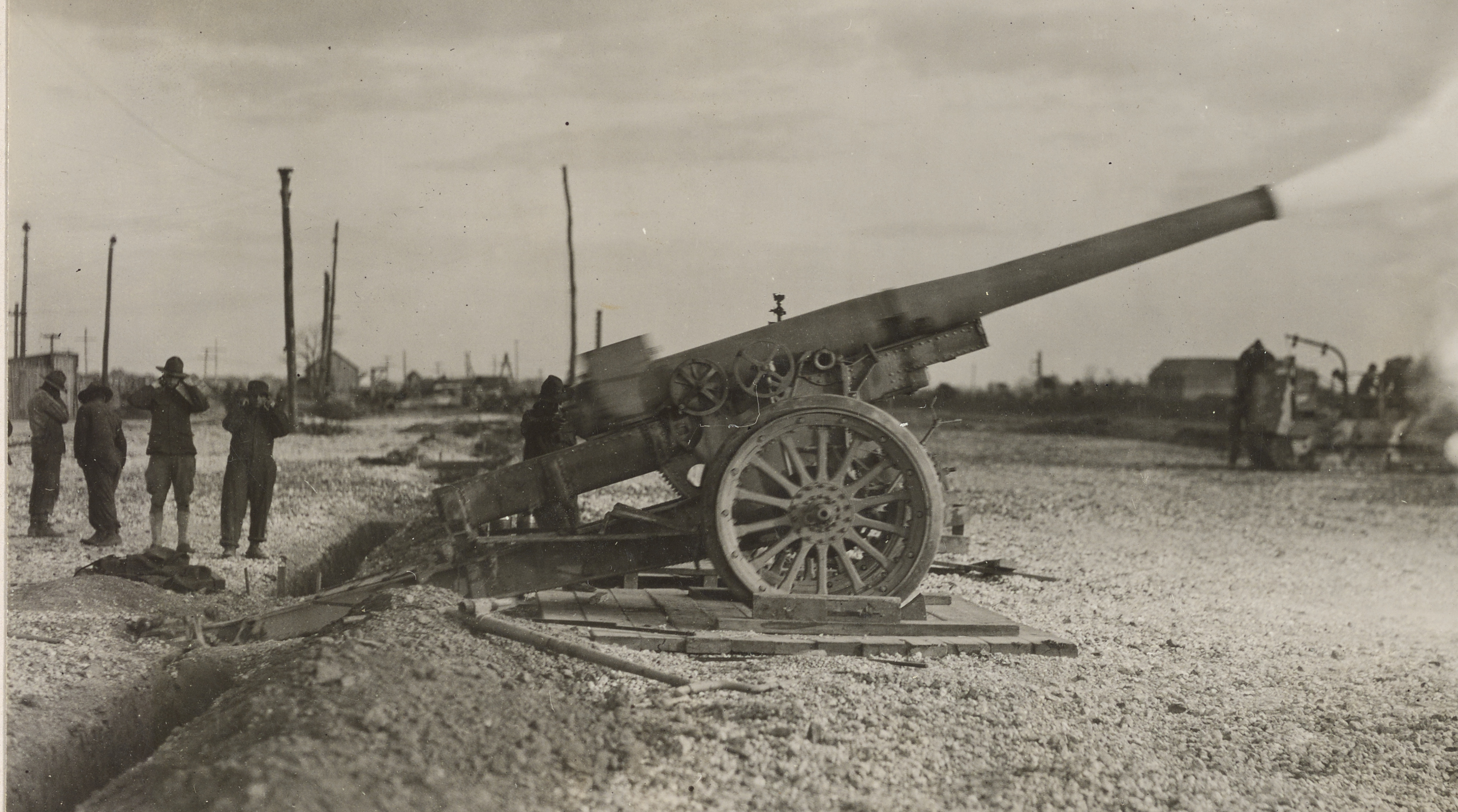
- Place of origin: France

Service history
- In service: 1918–1945
- Used by: France; Nazi Germany
- Wars: World War I World War II

Production history
- Designer: Schneider et Cie
- Designed: 1917
- Manufacturer: Schneider et Cie
- Produced: 1918-1919

Specifications
- Mass: Travel: 5,530 kg (12,190 lb); Action: 5,050 kg (11,130 lb)
- Barrel length: 4 m (13 ft 1 in) 26.4 caliber
- Shell: Separate loading charge and projectile
- Shell weight: 43 kg (95 lb)
- Caliber: 155 mm (6.1 in)
- Breech: de Bange
- Recoil: Hydro-pneumatic
- Carriage: Single-axle, box-trail
- Elevation: 1° to +43°
- Traverse: 6°
- Muzzle velocity: 561 m/s (1,840 ft/s)
- Maximum firing range: 13.6 km (8.5 mi)

The Canon de 155 L modèle 1918 Schneider was a French heavy artillery piece designed and produced during the First World War. A number were still on hand during the Second World War and served in French and German service.

== History ==
As the First World War settled into Trench Warfare on the Western Front the light field guns that the combatants went to war with were beginning to show their limitations when facing an enemy who was now dug into prepared positions. Indirect fire, interdiction and counter-battery fire emphasized the importance of long-range heavy artillery.

At the beginning of World War I, the French Army had about 1,300 de Bange 155 mm L modèle 1877 guns in its inventory. Although accurate and reliable it lacked a modern recoil system, which meant that after each shot the gun rolled back onto a set of wooden ramps and had to be re-laid before the next shot. In order to address a lack of heavy artillery, Schneider produced the Canon de 155 L modèle 1877/14 which mated the barrel of the mle 1877 with the box-trail carriage and hydro-pneumatic recoil mechanism of the 152 mm howitzer M1910 produced by Schneider for the Imperial Russian Army.

However, the Army still desired a longer range gun and in 1917 Schneider placed a new 32 caliber barrel onto the carriage of the mle 1877/1914. The result was the Canon de 155 L modèle 1917, a heavy gun which lacked mobility but had good range. If transported in one load it weighed 9,900 kg (21,800 lb) or 12,170 kg (26,830 lb) if the barrel was transported on its own trailer. The trade-off was each load weighed less, but more time was needed to reassemble the gun and bring it into action.

== Design ==
In 1917 Schneider proposed a new lighter gun by once again mating the barrel of the mle 1877 with the carriage and recoil mechanism of the Schneider Canon de 155 C modèle 1917. In order to do this, the trunnions were moved 11 inches to the rear and the barrel was inverted so the breech opened to the right. Also, a counterweight was added to the breech to balance the barrel. The result was that the mle 1918 weighed 5,050 kg (11,130 lb) in comparison to the 6,010 kg (13,250 lb) of the earlier mle 1877/1914 or the 8,956 kg (19,745 lb) of the 155 L mle 1917. This lighter weight meant it could be towed in one piece by a 10 horse team or artillery tractor.

== Service ==
The prototype was tested in April 1918 and was accepted for service in May of the same year. 120 mle 1918 cannons were ordered with the first four being delivered shortly before the Armistice in November 1918. The remaining guns were delivered between 1919 and 1920. Surviving guns were placed in storage and mobilized as part of the general reserve at the outbreak of World War II. After the fall of France in 1940, the Wehrmacht gave captured guns the designation 15.5 cm K 425(f).

== Comparison to French contemporaries ==
- The mle 1918 weighed 960 kg (2,120 lb) less than the mle 1887/1914, but its range of 13.6 km (8.5 mi) was roughly equal.
- The mle 1918 weighed less and was more mobile than the 155 L mle 1917, but its range was 4 km (2.5 mi) less and was a much older gun.
- The mle 1918 weighed 1,750 kg (3,860 lb) more than the 155 C modèle 1917, but its range was only 2 km (1.2 mi) greater and was a much older gun.
