= De Bange 155 mm cannon =

French 155 mm fortress and siege artillery

de Bange 155mm Long modèle 1877
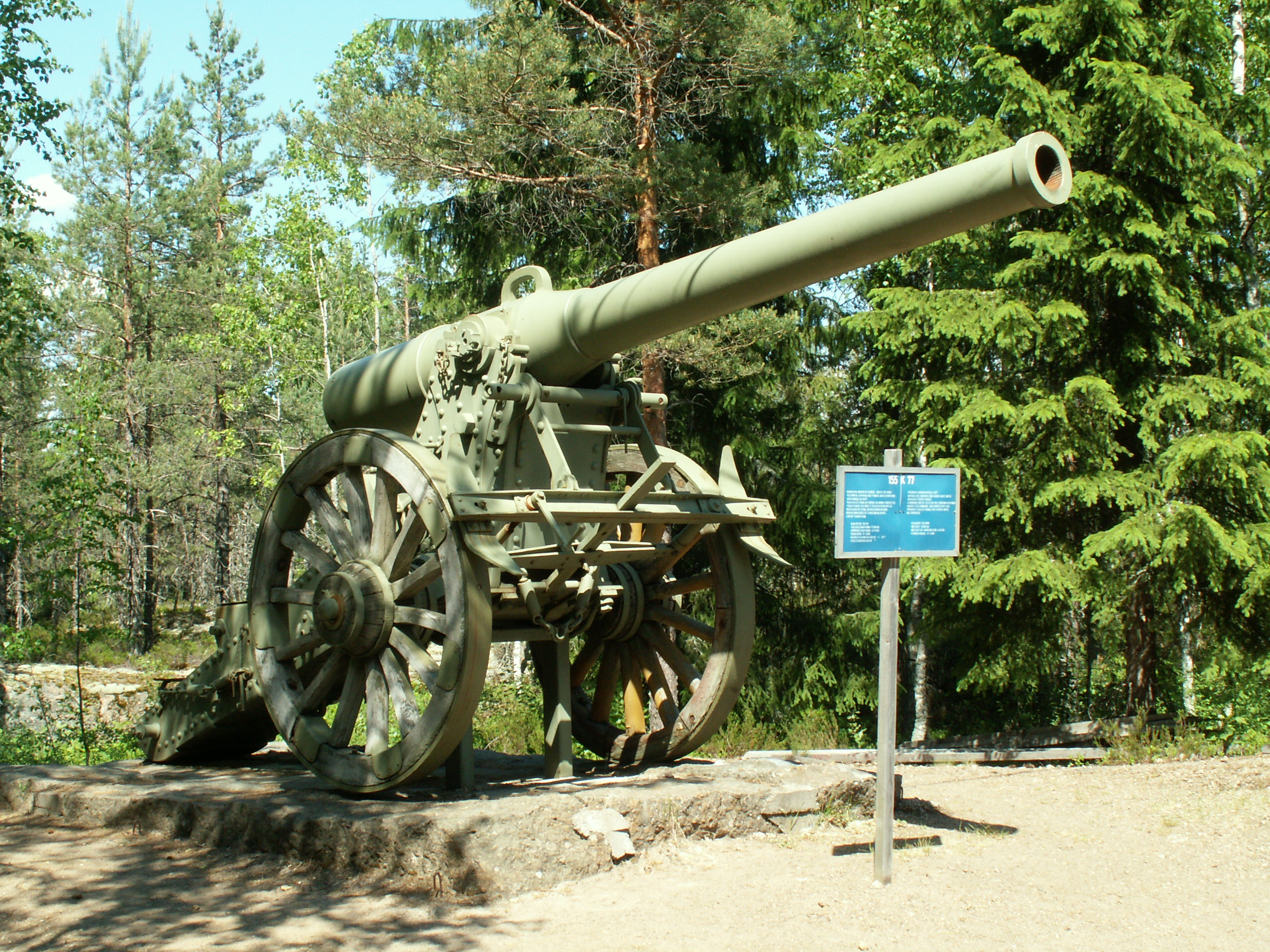
- 155 K 77 cannon at Salpa Line Museum, Miehikkälä, Finland
- Type: fortress and siege artillery (initial designation) counter-battery role (WWI)
- Place of origin: France

Service history
- In service: 1877–1944
- Used by: France; Finland; Kingdom of Romania; Soviet Union (Second Spanish Republic) Spanish Republic
- Wars: World War I World War II; Spanish Civil War; Continuation War

Production history
- Designer: Charles Ragon de Bange
- Designed: 1876
- No. built: ~1,400

Specifications
- Mass: 5,700 kg (12,600 lb); 6,500 kg (14,300 lb) on cingoli
- Barrel length: 4.2 m (14 ft) L/27
- Shell weight: 43.2 kg (100 lb) (1915 FA shell)
- Caliber: 155 mm (6.1 in)
- Breech: de Bange
- Recoil: None
- Carriage: Box trail
- Elevation: -10° to +28°
- Traverse: 4°
- Rate of fire: 1 rpm
- Muzzle velocity: 561 m/s (1,840 ft/s) with 1915 FA shell
- Maximum firing range: 12,700 m (13,900 yd) with 1915 FA shell

The de Bange 155 mm long cannon mle. 1877 (or more succinctly known as the 155 L de Bange) was the French artillery piece that debuted the 155 mm (6.1 in) caliber, which is still in widespread use across the world today. Although obsolete by the beginning of World War I, the 155 L de Bange was nonetheless pressed into service and became the main counter-battery piece of the French army in the first two years of the war.

== Development and 19th century deployment ==
155 L with serial number 1 (1877)

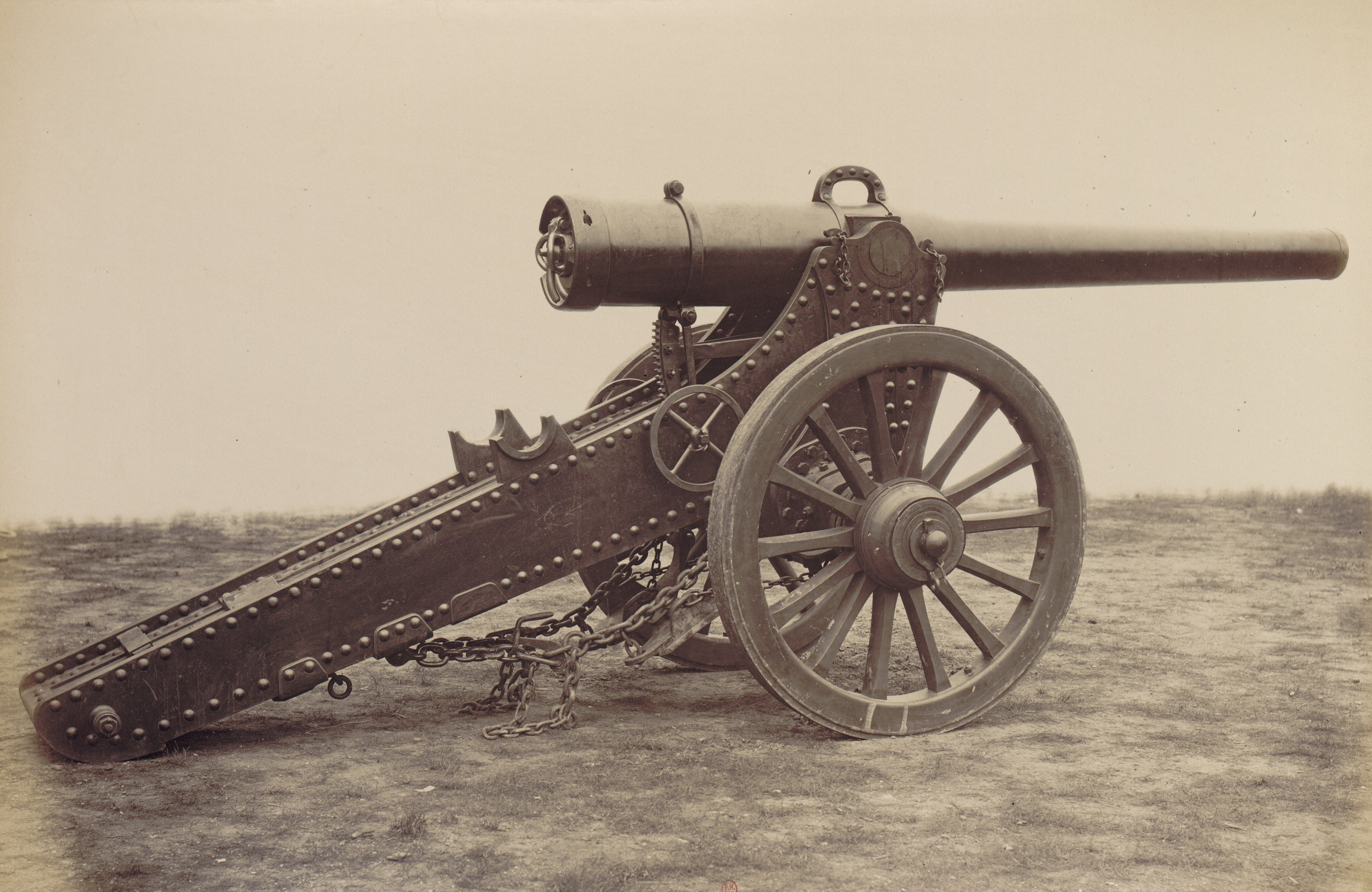
overview

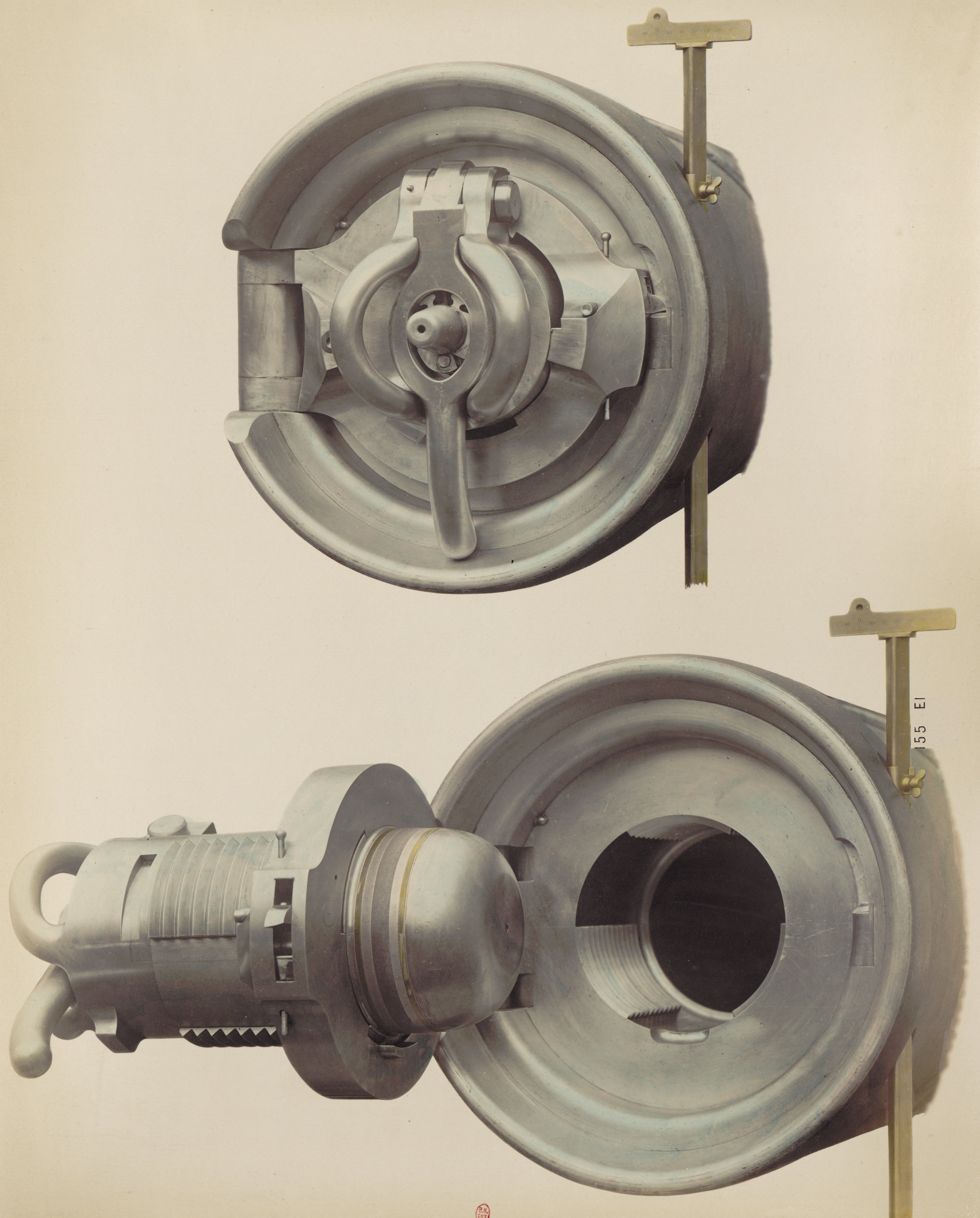
breech

Drawing from the experiences of the Franco-Prussian War of 1870–1871, a French artillery committee met on 2 February 1874 to discuss new models for the French fortress and siege artillery. Among them was a piece in the 14 to 16 cm (5.5 to 6.3 in) caliber range. After several meetings, on 16 April 1874, the committee settled on the 15.5 cm (6.1 in) caliber. In the subsequent program-letter of the committee, dating from 21 April, the caliber was, for the first time, expressed as 155 mm (6.1 in), (the other two calibers decided by this committee were the 120 mm (4.7 in) for a fortress/siege cannon and the 220 mm (8.7 in) mortar.) Three different 155 mm (6.1 in) prototypes were tested in Calais in 1876. The winner was Charles de Bange's model, and the French government ordered the first 300 pieces in November 1877.

In common with the other de Bange cannons, the 155 L de Bange had a hooped steel construction with gain-twist rifling. In its original (1877) conception, the cannon required a wooden platform from which to fire. Its recoil was absorbed simply by friction with the platform, and the 155 L de Bange had to be pushed back into position after every shot. In 1883, the Saint-Chamond hydraulic brake was introduced to better absorb recoil. This brake was a separate piece of equipment that anchored the cannon's carriage to the firing platform and returned it into position after about 110 cm (43 in) of recoil.

Approximately 1,400 pieces of 155 L de Bange were built in the 19th century. Most were placed in France's numerous fortresses of the time (part of the Séré de Rivières system), most notably at Toul, Belfort, and Verdun. In 1882, about 200 pieces of 155 L de Bange were retained for offensive operations as siege artillery. In this role, each 155 L de Bange gun was drawn by ten horses.

== French service in World War I ==
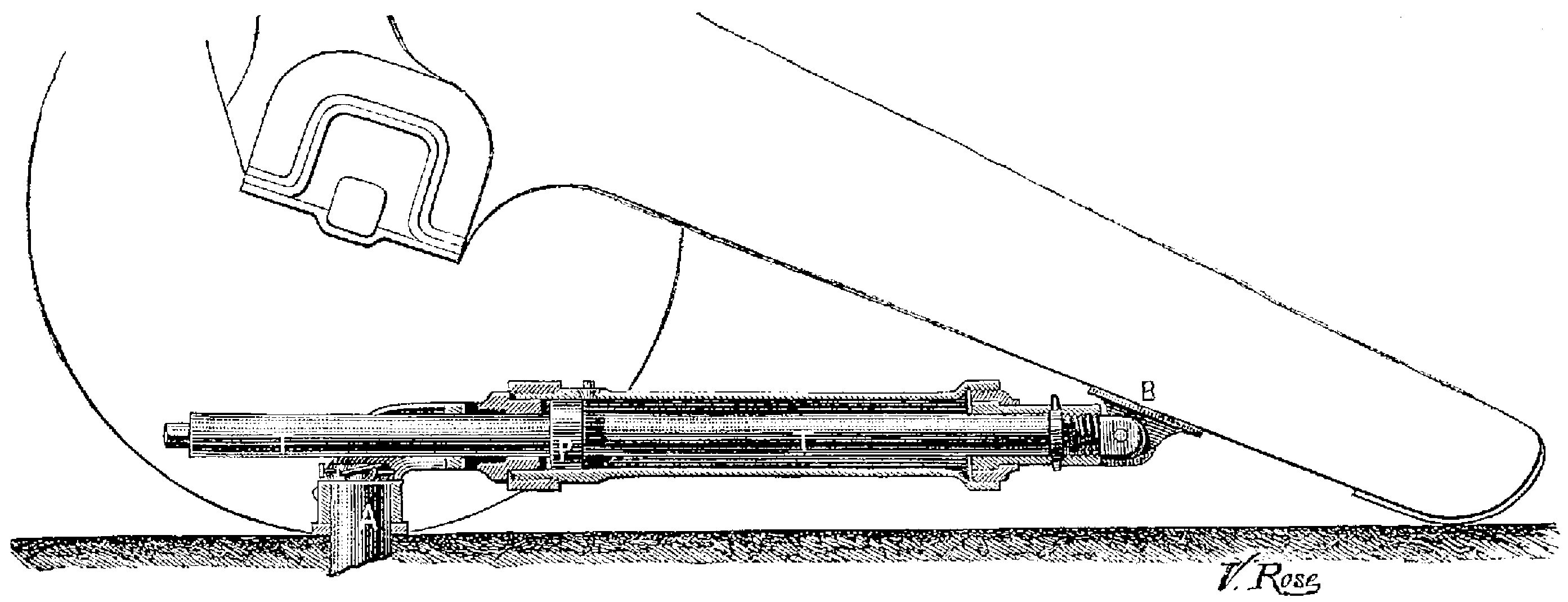
A cutaway of the St. Chamond hydraulic brake used with gun

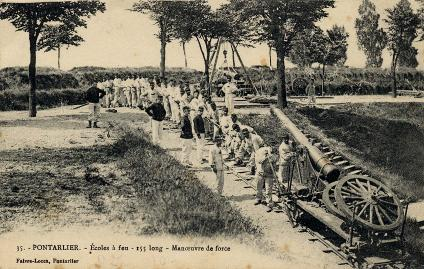
A 155 L pulled into position at the Pontarlier artillery school, 1905-1910

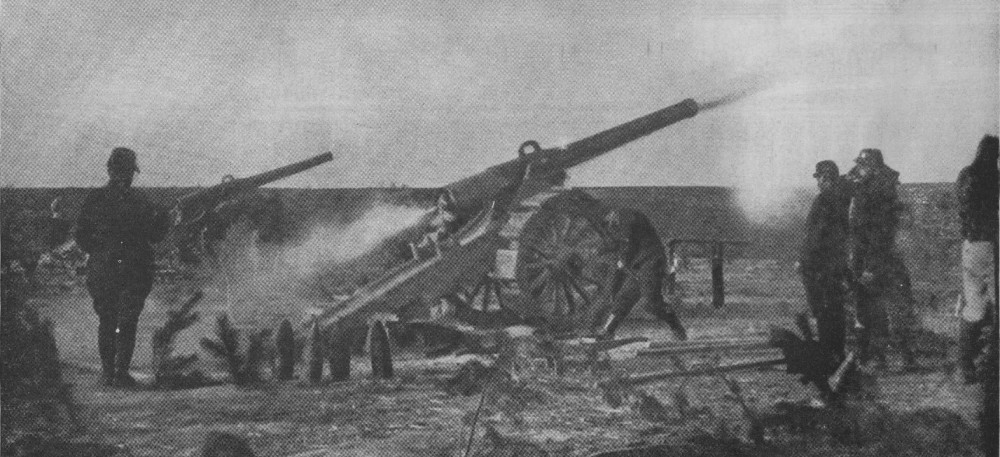
Battery on cingoli, 1914 or 1915

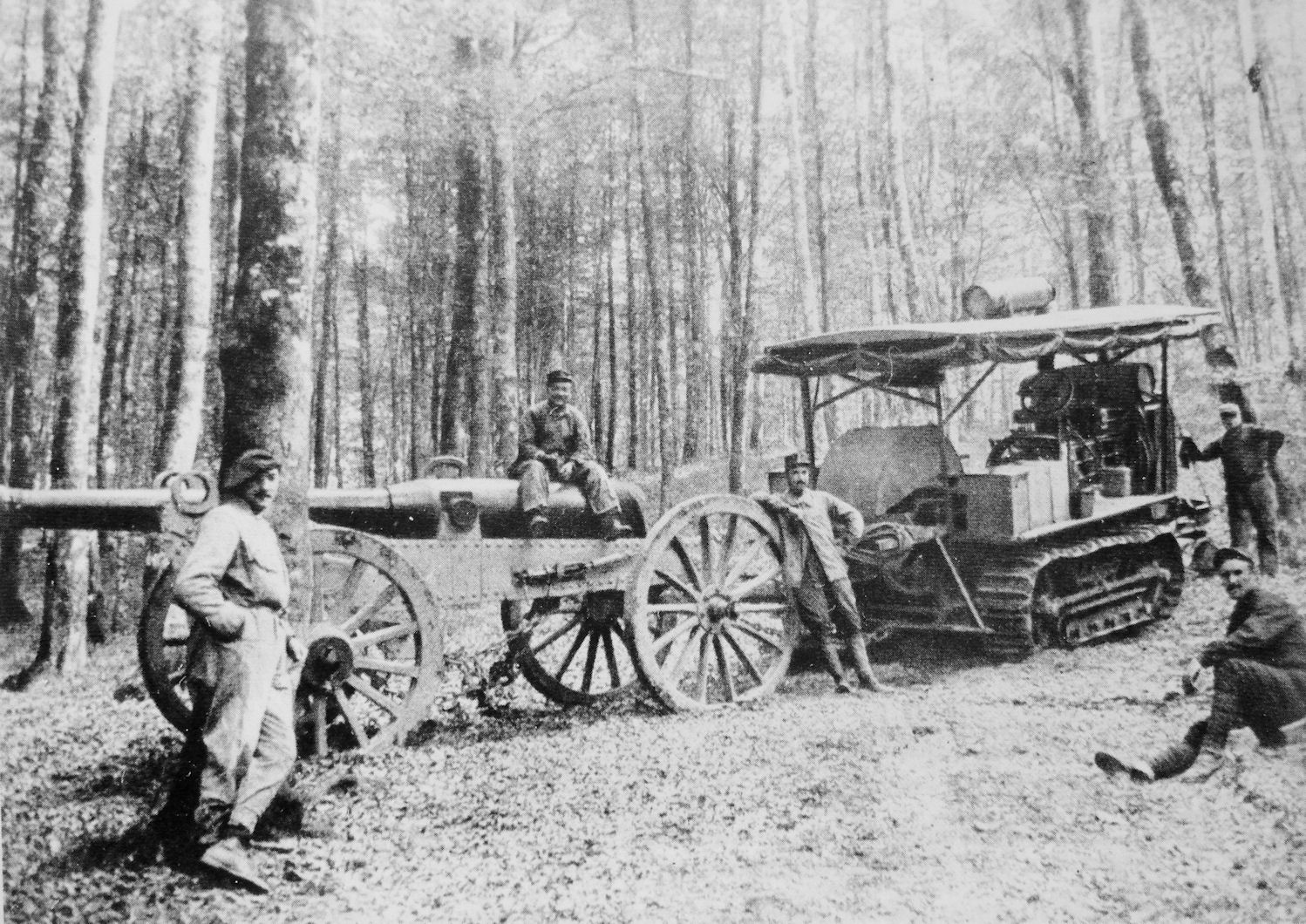
155 L towed by a Holt tractor, Vosges, 1915

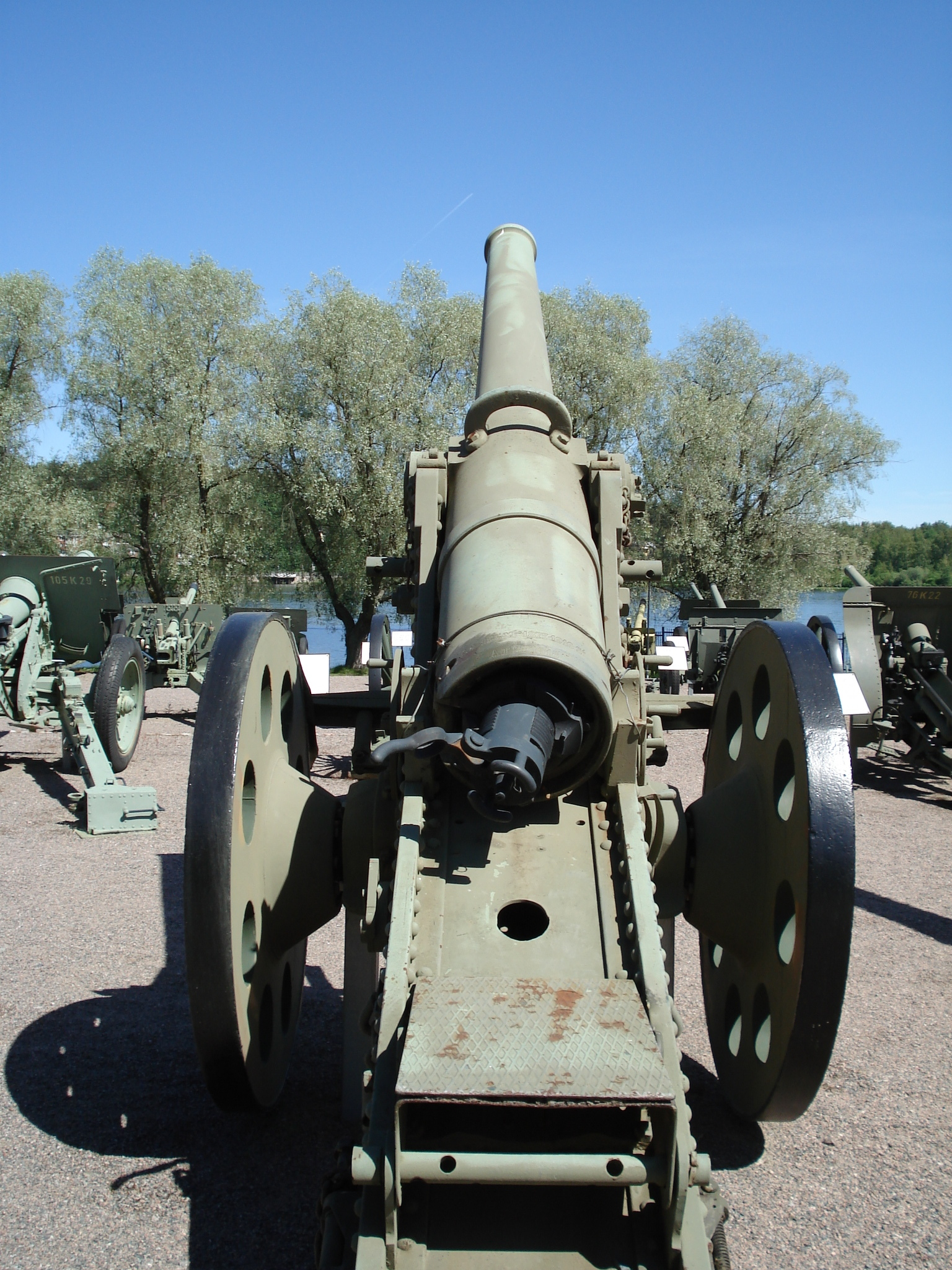
Barrel manufactured during the war

At the turn of the 20th century the 155 L de Bange cannons were rendered obsolete by the newer quick-firing guns using the French 75 hydro-pneumatic recoil mechanism, in which only the barrel recoiled. Besides the technical obsolesce issue, the French army's doctrine at the time emphasizing mobility—"75 for everything" had become its universal mantra for field artillery. The 155 L de Bange was therefore retained in forts and in reserve. On 2 August 1914, the French army had 1,392 pieces of 155 L de Bange, either in depots or in fixed positions; not a single one was part of the equipment of a mobile unit. On the eve of World War I, a typical French army corps was equipped with 120 75 mm (3.0 in) cannons, while its German counterpart had 108 77 mm (3.0 in), 36 105 mm (4.1 in), and 16 150 mm (5.9 in) pieces.

The first engagement of the 155 L de Bange was probably by the 8th Foot Artillery Regiment firing from place fortifiée d'Épinal during the Battle of the Mortagne on August 27. The first artillery duels of the war quickly convinced the French of their inferiority in heavy artillery relative to the Germans. Thus, it was seen necessary to enhance the mobility of their 155 mm (6.1 in) guns. In October 1914, a program was started to fit the 155 L de Bange wheels with a system of metallic soles and gutters that articulated together. The use of this system was known as Cingoli or Bonagente wheel belts after the name of their Italian inventor which eliminated the laborious construction of wooden platforms. The Cingoli tracks added 800 kg (1,800 lb) to the gun's total weight, but saved 5 t (4.9 long tons; 5.5 short tons) of bedding material that otherwise had to be transported for the wooden platforms. The use of Cingolis also reduced the time required to deploy the 155 mm (6.1 in) gun from 5–6 hours to just one hour.

In an attempt to match the field artillery employed by the Germans, on 27 November 1914, each French army corps was endowed with a heavy artillery group. By November 30 of that year, 112 pieces of 155 L de Bange had already been mobilized for this purpose, although other types of heavy pieces were allotted for these groups as well. In October–November 1915, a more structured organization was introduced, grouping the 155 L de Bange in mobile service in 30 heavy artillery regiments. Twenty of these regiments were horse drawn (totaling 320 pieces of 155 L de Bange), while ten regiments used motorized tractors for transportation and had a mixture of 155 L de Bange and 120 L de Bange guns. By 1 August 1916, the number of 155 L de Bange guns in mobile service (regardless of means of transportation) reached 738 pieces. The number of motorized 155 L de Bange guns also increased from 40 at the end of 1915 to 128 in July 1917.

A significant improvement in combat capabilities was achieved by boosting the powder charge of the 155 L de Bange, a measure made possible by the strong construction of the gun. Before 1914, the typical shell fired by the 155 L de Bange had a speed of 470 m/s (1,500 ft/s) and a range not exceeding 9,800 m (10,700 yd), with the boosted powder charge adopted in 1915, the shell speed increased to 561 m/s (1,840 ft/s) and gained 2,900 m (3,200 yd) in range.

Starting in May 1916, the 155 L de Bange guns were progressively replaced by newer models of the same or similar caliber. The 155 L de Bange tubes were generally retired after they had 10,000 rounds fired through them. Owing to production shortages of the more modern artillery pieces that were supposed to replace the 155 L de Bange, a number of replacement barrels for the 155 L de Bange were however manufactured starting in 1916. These were of somewhat simplified construction, with constant-step rifling. The most distinctive visual difference between the old and new 155 L de Bange barrels is their lifting handle, which is longitudinally aligned with the main axis of the old barrels but is transversely mounted on the new barrels. The introduction of quick-firing, replacement materiel for the 155 L de Bange, which was initiated by the First Stage of the Realization of the Heavy Field Artillery Program of May 30, 1916 was still not finished in November 1918. The field artillery of each French army corps still had a battalion of 155 L de Bange model 1877 guns late into the war.

== Allied and interwar service ==
Some 155 L de Bange guns were also given to France's allies during the war. Three 155 L de Bange were in the possession of the Romanian Army in 1915; by 1918, there were four. The Romanian battery using them served with the 1st Siege Regiment of Bucharest (Romanian: Regimentul 1 Asediu) throughout the war.

Eighty 155 L de Bange were given by France to the Russian Empire, fifty in 1916 and thirty in 1917. These guns were inherited and also used by the Red Army during the Russian Civil War. For example, six 155 L de Bange were used by the 51st Rifle Division in their defense of Kakhovka in 1920. In the Soviet army organization, the 155 L de Bange pieces and other heavy guns were part of a central reserve called Тяжёлая артиллерия особого назначения (TAON).

At the end of June 1937, 32 155 L de Bange guns manufactured under license in Perm were sent by the Soviets to the Republican forces fighting in the Spanish Civil War; these were sent aboard the ship Cabo de Santo Tomé, which unloaded its cargo at Cartagena. The Spanish Republicans formed 15 two-gun batteries with these and kept two guns in reserve for training. One 155 L de Bange gun nicknamed "El Abuelo" ("The grandfather") entered public consciousness after being deployed and photographed in Plaza de España, Madrid. (This was not however the only gun called "El Abuelo" during this conflict.)

== World War II ==
Some 305 155 L de Bange artillery pieces still equipped French forts as of 10 May 1940; of these, 168 were deployed in the Maginot Line and 137 in the smaller works in the South-East.

In 1940, during the Winter War, France donated forty-eight 155 L de Bange cannons to Finland, as part of a larger artillery equipment help, but these arrived too late to take part in that conflict. The 155 L de Bange served, however, as the 155 K/77 during the Continuation War. All 48 guns were still in Finnish service in September 1941; the number of operational 155 K/77 pieces decreased to 42 by January 1944 and to just 19 by September of that year. The Finns used them with a 43.6 kg (96 lb) shell with a 5.7 kg (13 lb) explosive charge, attaining a range of 12.3 km (7.6 mi). Four of the 155 L de Bange guns donated were converted to coastal guns under the designation 155/27 BaMk (De Bange Mk-lavetilla).

== Ammunition ==
The 155 L Mle 1877 used separate textile casing for the propellant.

The French used several shells with the Mle 1877:

- Obus en fonte Mle 1877 (cast iron shell), 41 kg (90 lb) with 2.4 kg (5.3 lb) of black powder
- Obus en fonte Mle 1877-1914 (cast iron shell), 41 kg (90 lb) with 2.4 kg (5.3 lb) of melinite
- Obus allongé en acier Mle 1890 (lengthened steel shell), 43 kg (95 lb) with 10.3 kg (23 lb) of melinite
- Obus allongé en acier Mle 1914 (lengthened steel shell), 42.5 kg (94 lb) with 10.4 kg (23 lb) of explosive
- Obus à mitraille Mle 1877 (Shrapnel shell), 43 kg (95 lb) with 416 bullets and 288 fragments
- Obus en acier à balles Mle 1879-1915 (Shrapnel shell), 40.59 kg (89.5 lb) with 270 bullets
- Obus FA modèle 1915 (high-explosive shell), 43.2 kg (95 lb) with 4.65 kg (10.3 lb) of explosive
- Boîte à mitraille Mle 1881 (grapeshot, not a shell), 40 kg (88 lb), with 429 bullets

== Conversions ==
- Canon de 155 L modèle 1877/14 Schneider - mated the barrel of the mle 1877 with the box-trail carriage and hydro-pneumatic recoil mechanism of the 152 mm howitzer M1910 produced by Schneider for the Imperial Russian Army.
- Canon de 155 L Modele 1917 Schneider - mated the carriage of the mle 1877/14 with a new barrel.
- Canon de 155 L modèle 1918 Schneider - mated the barrel of the mle 1877 with the box-trail carriage and recoil mechanism of the Schneider Canon de 155 C modèle 1917.
- Materiel de 155 Sur Affut-truck Schneider - six coastal defense guns were converted to railroad guns.

== Surviving examples ==
- Two pieces in Oulu, Finland
- Salpa Line Museum, Miehikkälä, Finland
- The Artillery Museum of Finland, Hämeenlinna, Finland
- Verdun Memorial, Fleury-devant-Douaumont, France
- National Military Museum, Romania, Bucharest
- State Central Museum of Contemporary History of Russia, Moscow
- Central Armed Forces Museum, Moscow, Russia
- Norwalk Green, Norwalk, Connecticut, United States - gift of the French Government in 1921

== See also ==
- 155 mm Creusot Long Tom
