= 105 mm Armata wz. 29 =

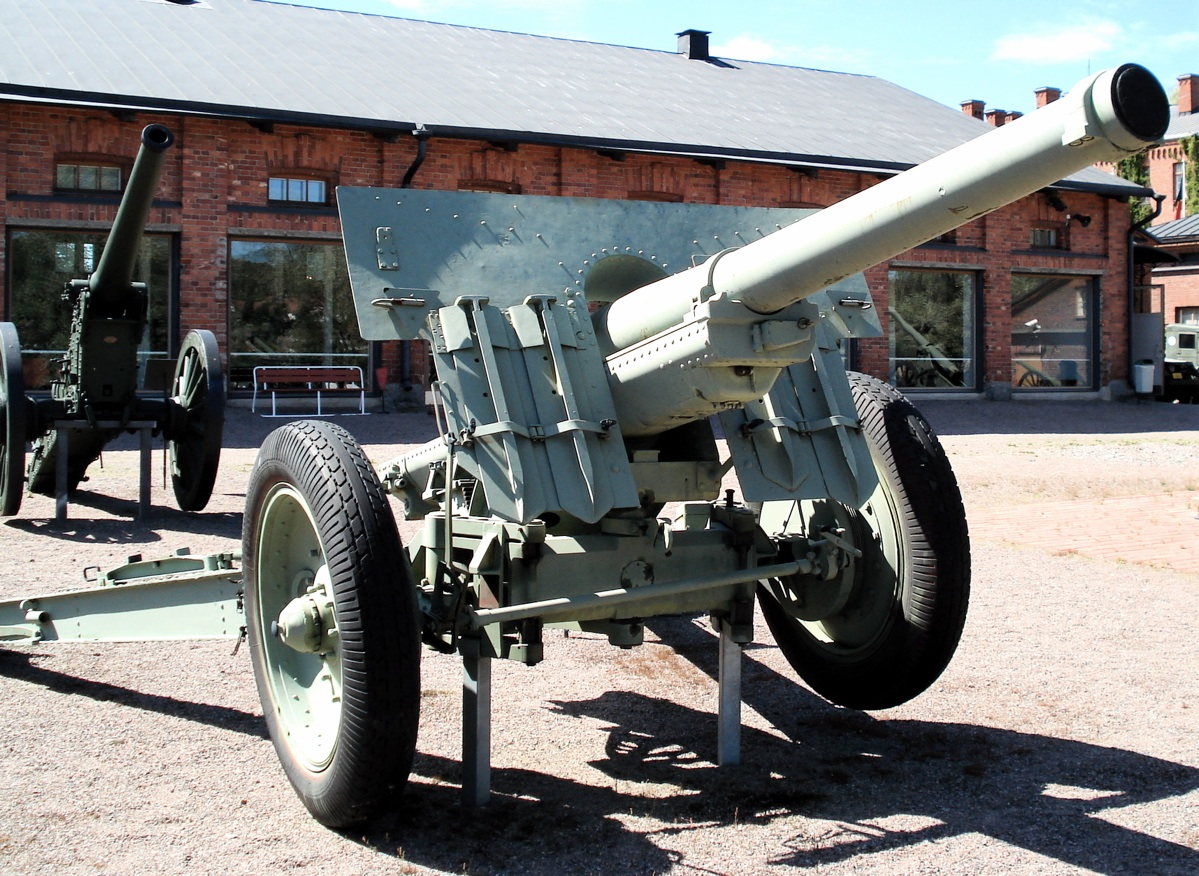
- A 105 mm Armata wz. 29 at the Hämeenlinna Artillery Museum, Finland.
- Type: Field gun
- Place of origin: France

Service history
- Used by: Poland; Finland; Nazi Germany
- Wars: Continuation War; World War II

Production history
- Designer: Schneider-Creusot
- Manufacturer: Schneider-Creusot; Starachowice Works
- Produced: 1929
- No. built: France: 96-104; Poland: 40-48

Specifications
- Mass: Combat: 2,880 kg (6,350 lb); Travel: 3,410 kg (7,520 lb)
- Length: 6.4 m (20 ft)
- Barrel length: 3.24 m (10 ft 8 in) L/31
- Width: 2.25 m (7 ft 5 in)
- Height: 1.43 m (4 ft 8 in)
- Crew: 9
- Shell: Separate loading bagged charges and projectile
- Shell weight: 15.5 kg (34 lb)
- Caliber: 105 mm (4.1 in)
- Breech: Interrupted screw
- Recoil: Hydro-pneumatic
- Carriage: Split trail
- Elevation: 0° to +43°
- Traverse: 25°
- Rate of fire: 6 rpm
- Muzzle velocity: 600–660 m/s (2,000–2,200 ft/s)
- Maximum firing range: 15.5 km (9.6 mi)

The 105 mm Armata wz. 29 was a field gun produced in France and Poland that was used by Poland, Nazi Germany, and Finland during World War II.

== History ==
After the defeat of the Central Powers during World War I the Allies agreed to reconstitute the country of Poland from the territory which had been partitioned by the German Empire, Austro-Hungarian Empire, and Russian Empire. The new armed forces of the Second Polish Republic inherited a mix of German, Russian and Austro-Hungarian weapons from its former occupiers. Poland also received French technical assistance and weapons to rebuild its armed forces after World War I. Large numbers of Russian weapons were also captured during the Polish-Soviet War when the Red Army was defeated after the Battle of Warsaw in 1920.

== Design ==
Although sometimes referred to as a modernized or upgraded Canon de 105 mle 1913 Schneider the 105 mm Armata wz. 29 was a new design with significant differences from the mle 1913. The wz. 29 originated from a French design produced by Schneider-Creusot for the arms export market. The wz. 29 differed from the mle 1913 in that it had a split trail carriage, wooden-spoked steel-rimmed wheels, new hydro-pneumatic recoil mechanism, new interrupted screw breech, new rifling pattern, longer L/31 barrel, new gun shield, and it fired separate loading bagged charges and projectiles.

These new features allowed the wz. 29 to reach an elevation of 43° and traverse of 25° L/R. The change to separate loading bagged charges and projectiles allowed the wz. 29 to use larger propellant charges than the mle 1913's separate loading cased ammunition. This improved muzzle velocity and when combined with greater elevation gave the wz. 29 longer range than the mle 1913. However, the change in ammunition also reduced its rate of fire to 6 rounds per minute.

== Users ==
=== Poland ===
In Polish service, the Canon de 105 mle 1913 Schneider was given the designation 105 mm Armata wz. 13. The first Polish unit to use the wz. 13 was General Józef Haller's Blue Army that was created in France in 1917. The Blue Army received 16 guns which armed two Heavy Artillery Regiments. When World War I ended the Blue Army returned to Poland with their guns. In the spring of 1919 Poland bought 12 of the similar Cannone da 105/28 produced under license in Italy by Gio. Ansaldo & C. By the end of the Polish-Soviet War 64 wz. 13's had been delivered by France and between 1923 and 1927 another 54 wz. 13's were purchased.

By 1935 approximately 96-104 wz. 29's had been delivered by France and starting in 1937 another 40-48 wz. 29's were produced under license at the Starachowice Works in Poland at an average rate of 4 guns per month. At the outbreak of World War II a further 32 wz. 29's were scheduled to be completed by a new factory at Stalowa Wola by the end of 1939 with another 44 guns to be completed during 1940. It is estimated that in 1939 Poland had 118 wz. 13 guns and 124 wz. 29 guns in their Heavy Artillery Regiments. Together the wz. 13 and wz. 29 were the standard long-range heavy artillery in service with the Polish Army.

In Polish service, they were either towed by eight-horse teams or Citroën-Kegresse P14 and C4P half-track artillery tractors. In both Polish and Finnish service the wz. 29 were often used as long-range counter-battery guns. In comparison to their Soviet rivals the wz. 29 out-ranged most of the modernized World War One era 122 mm and 152 mm howitzers. But the wz. 29 was out-ranged by most Soviet field guns including the modernized World War One era 107 mm gun M1910/30.

An earlier variant of the gun (mle 25/27) designed for Greece was bought by the Polish Navy for coastal defence in small numbers, it differed in the carriage design.

=== Finland ===
Finland bought 12 mle 1913's from France during the Winter War and they also re-barreled six of the Schneider designed and Russian built 107 mm gun M1910's to 105 mm and gave them the designation 105 K/10. The mle 1913 was based on the design of the design of the M1910 and shared similarities. They were also able to purchase 54 captured 105 mm Armata wz. 29 guns from Germany. Of the 54 bought from Germany 40 arrived on the Inga on the 2nd of October 1940 and 14 arrived on the Widor on the 9th of October 1940. In Finnish service, the mle 1913's were given the designation 105 K/13 while the wz. 29's were given the designation 105 K/29. They were assigned to five Heavy Artillery Battalions during Continuation War and many of the guns were fitted with pneumatic tires and sprung axles for motor traction. In 1944, eight guns were lost and after World War II the remainder were placed in reserve until retired.

=== Germany ===
Guns captured during the Polish Campaign were given the German designations 10.5 cm K 13(p) and 10.5 cm K 29(p) and were assigned second line duties, like coastal defense.

== Gallery ==
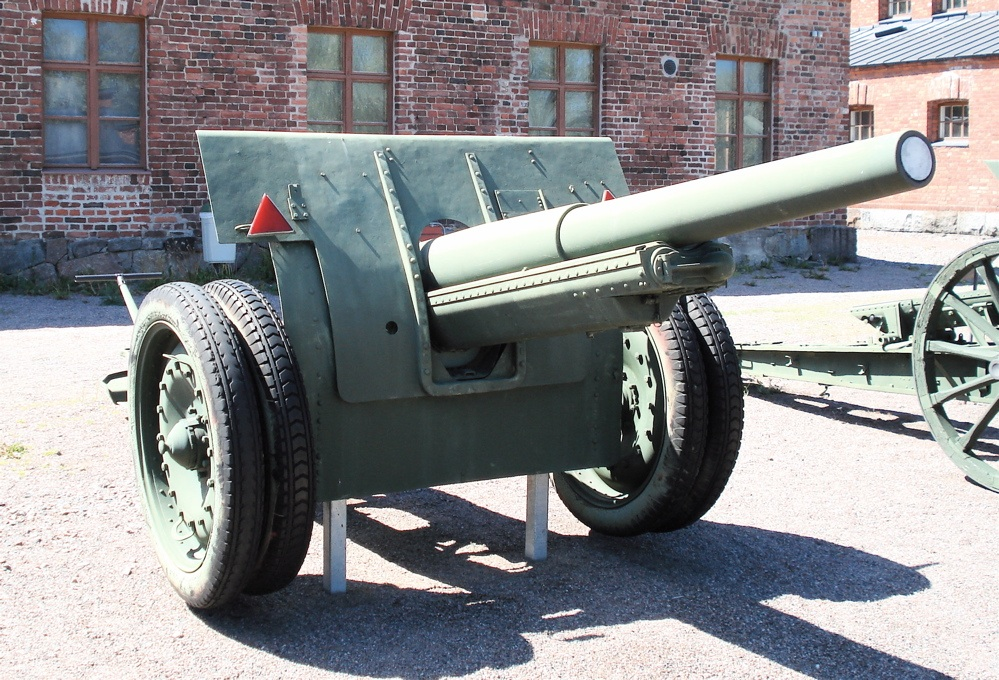
A modernized 105 K/13 on display at the Hämeenlinna Artillery Museum.

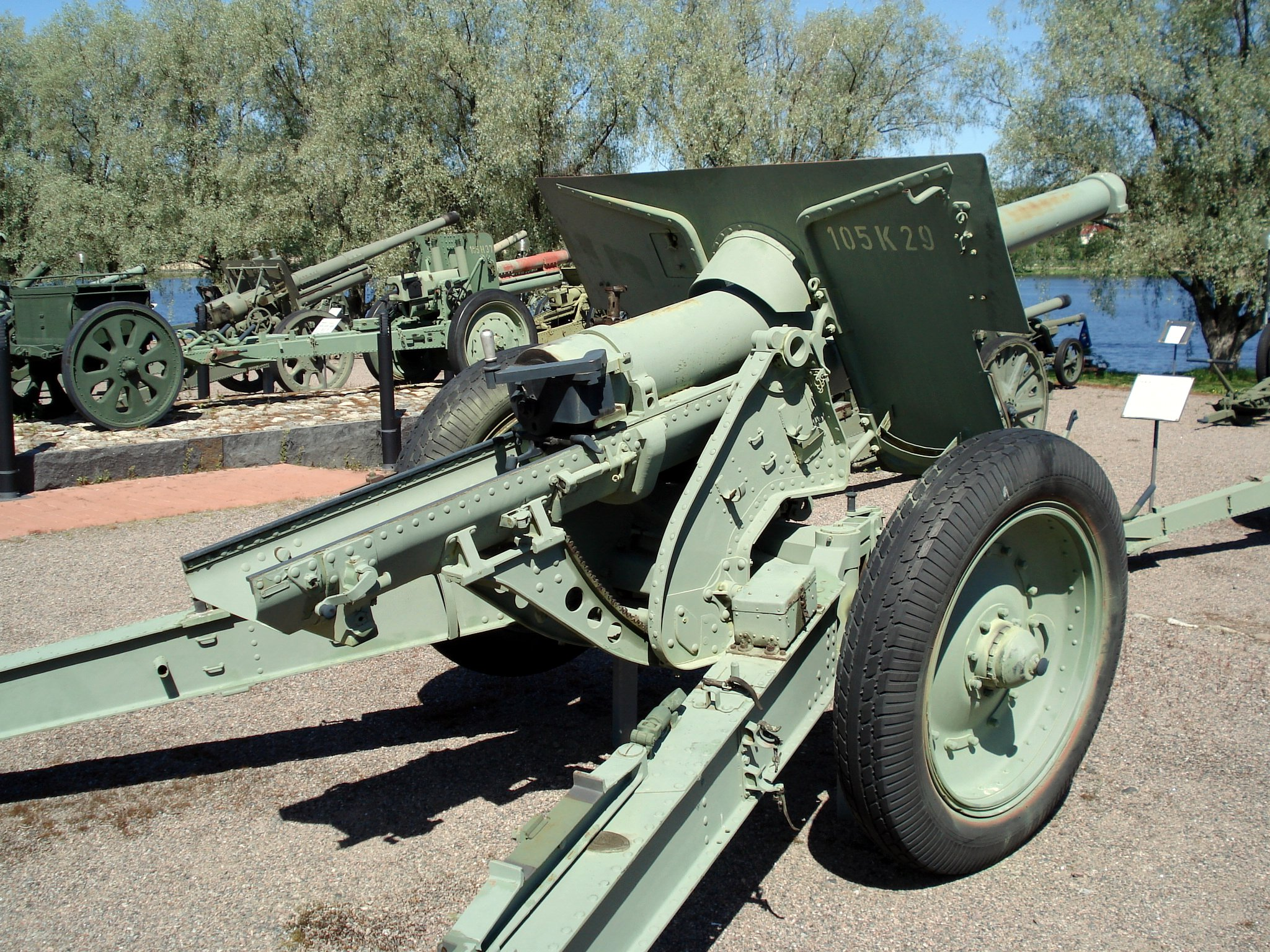
A 105 K/29 on display at the Hämeenlinna Artillery Museum.

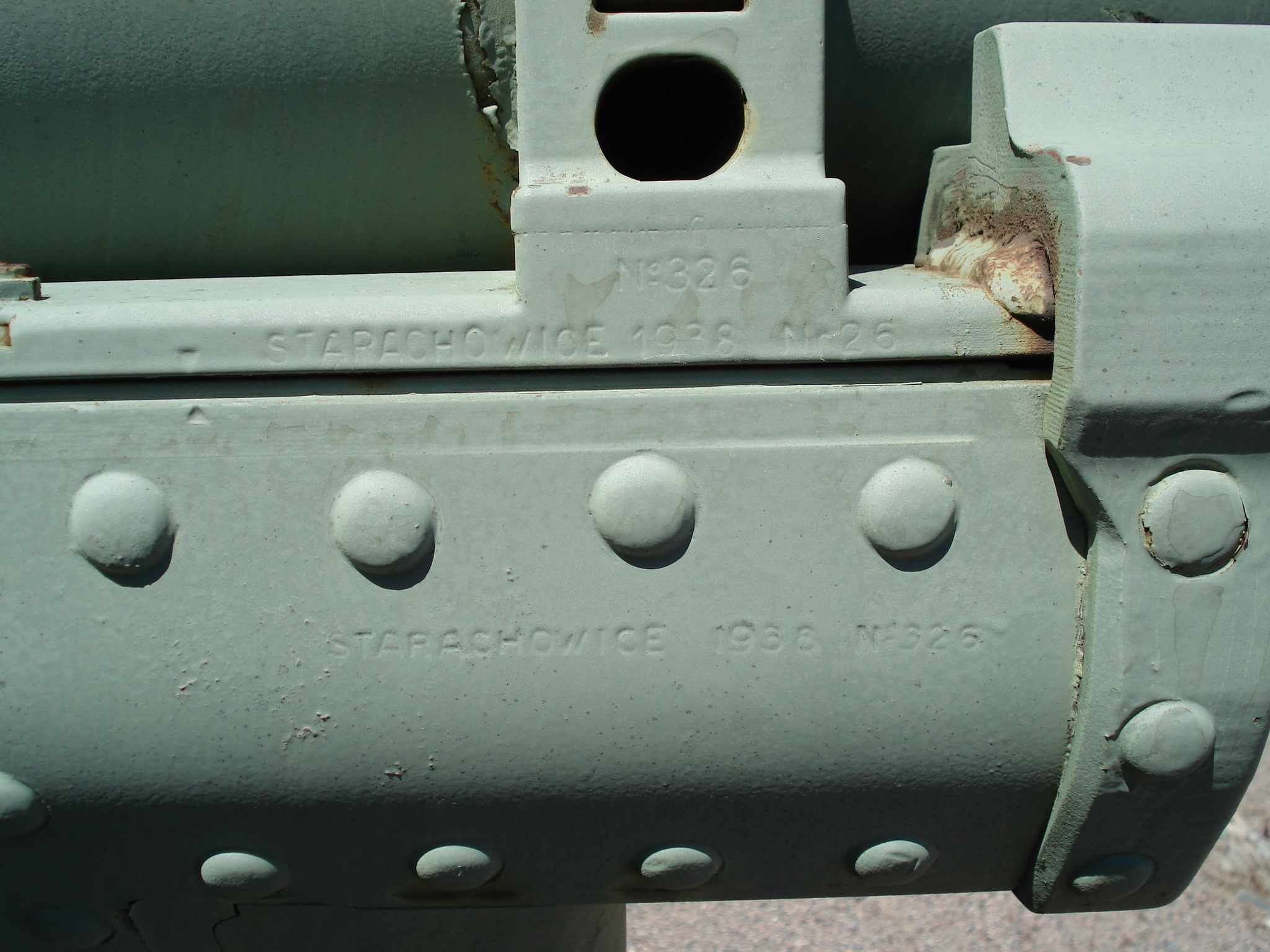
A Polish built 105 K/29 on display at the Hämeenlinna Artillery Museum.

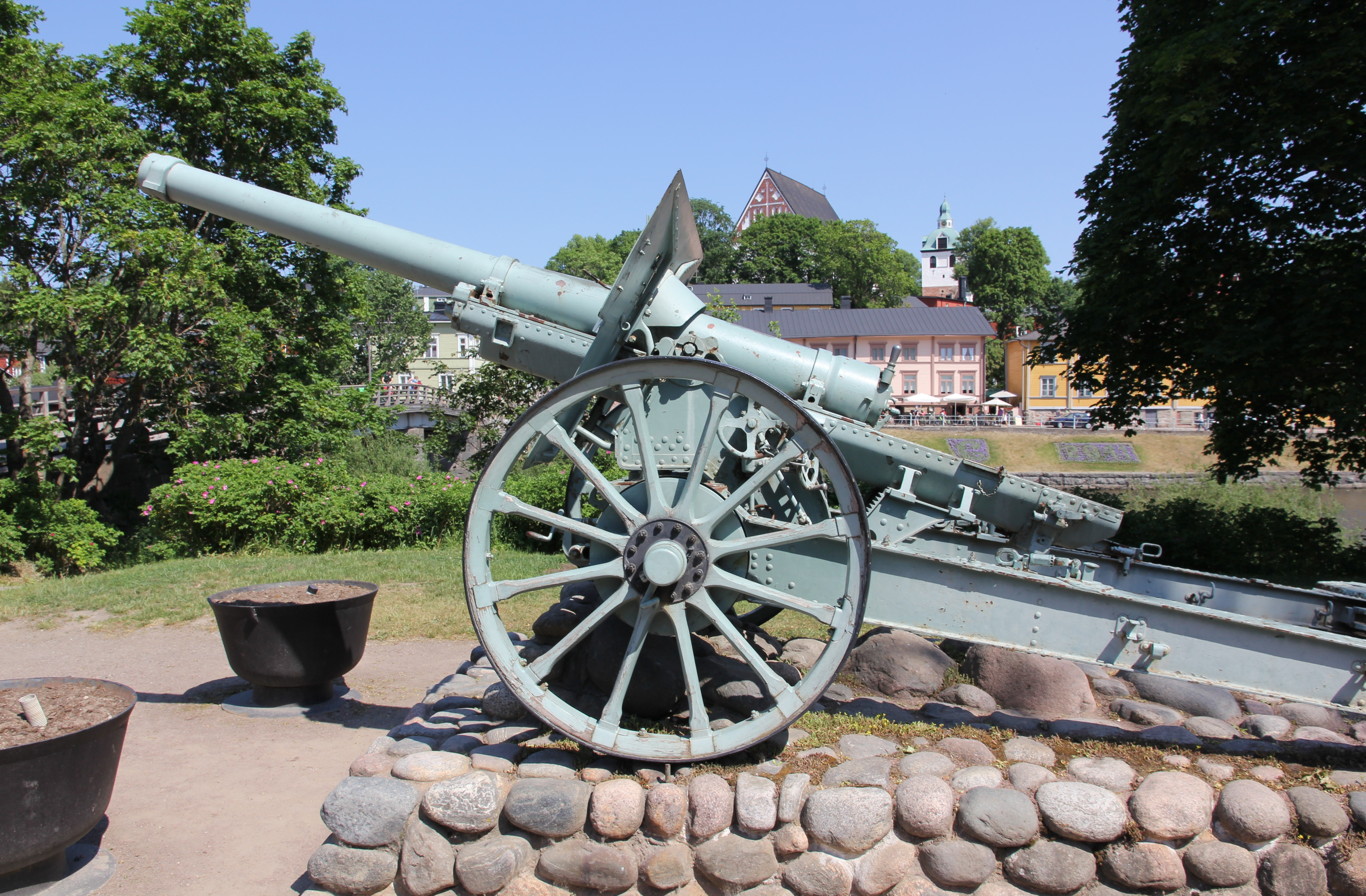
A 105 K/29 at the memorial to the 21st Heavy Artillery Battalion at Porvoo, Finland.

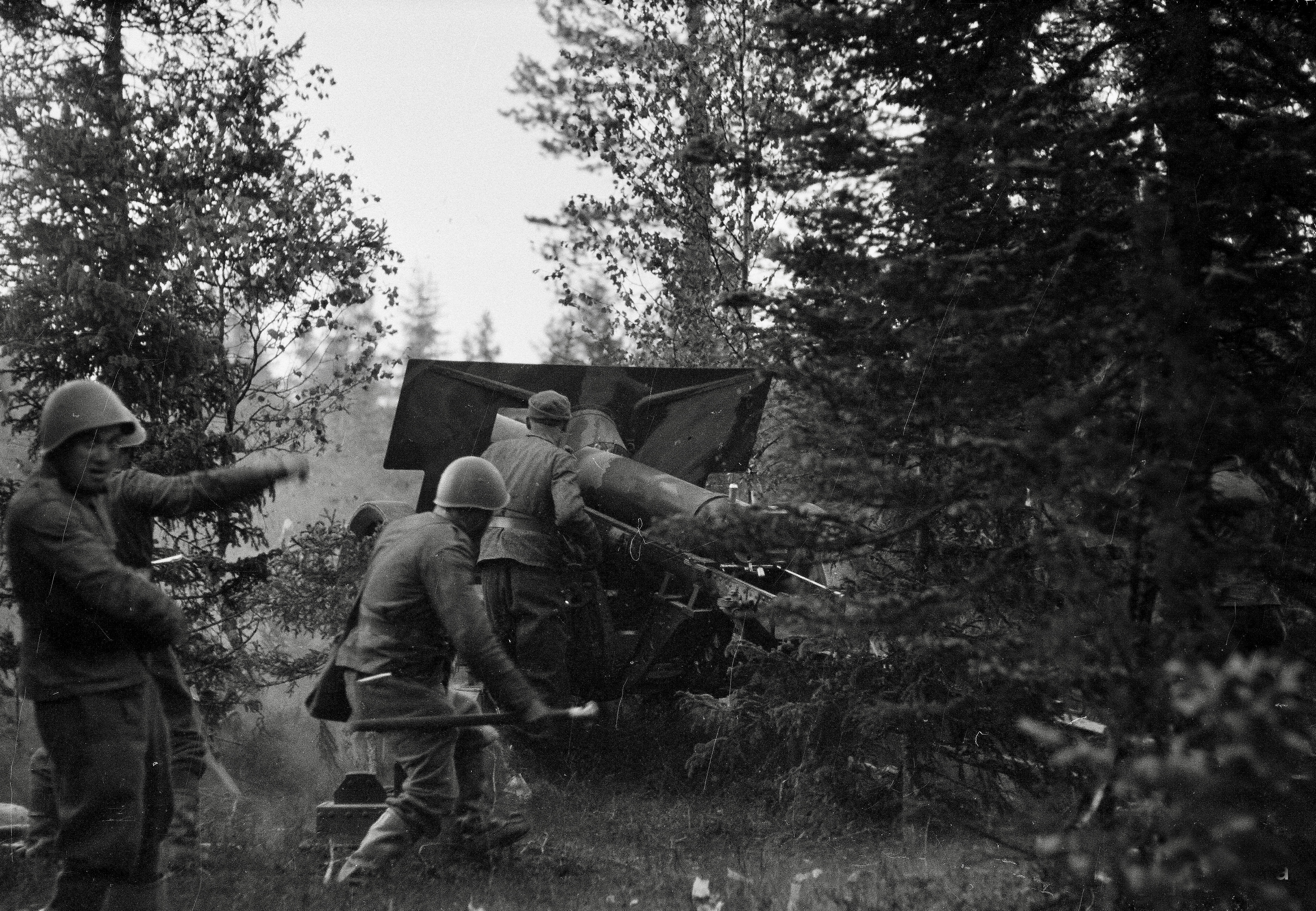
A 105 K/29 in action near Vasonvaara, Finland.

== See also ==
- 75 mm Armata wz.02/26
- 120 mm Armata wz.78/09/31
