= 152 mm howitzer M1910 =

152 mm howitzer Model 1910 Schneider
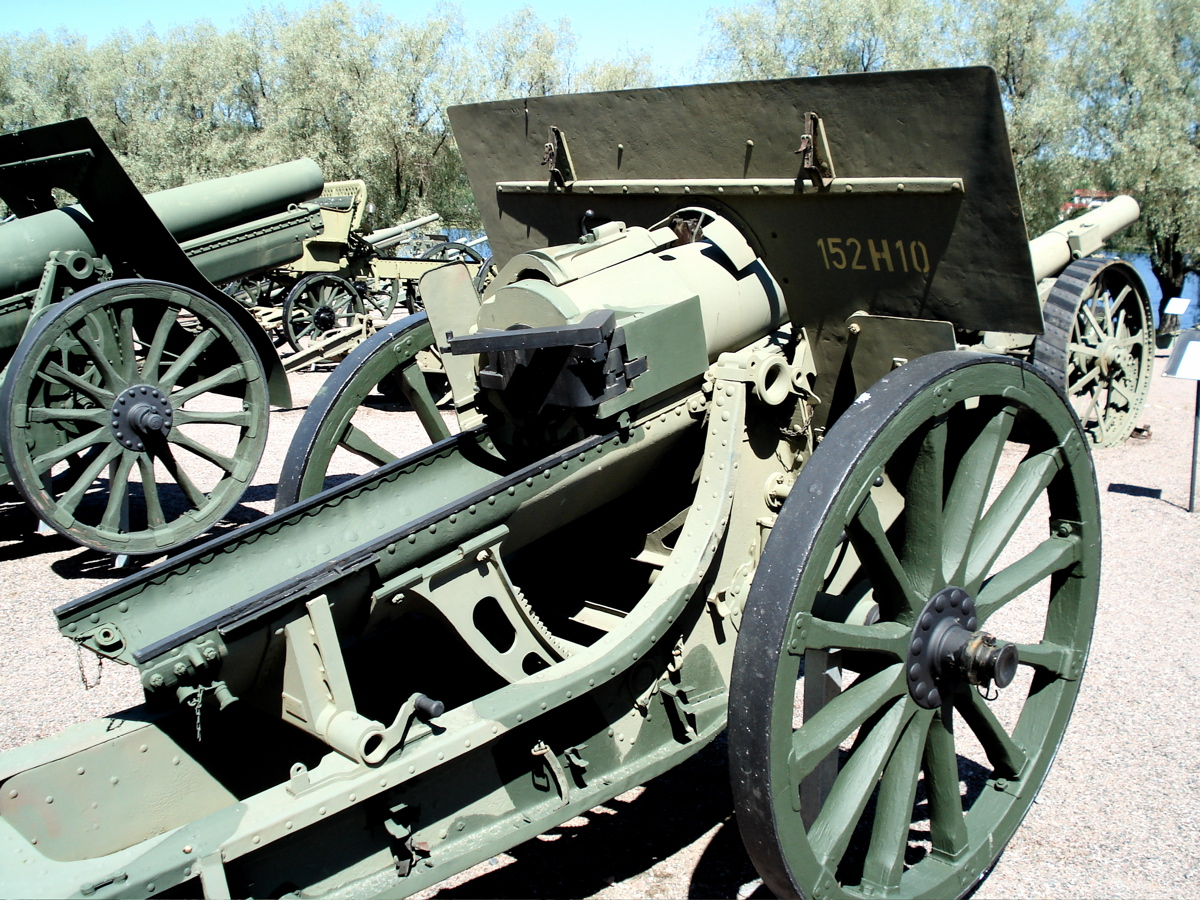
- 152 mm howitzer Model 1910 Schneider displayed in Hämeenlinna Artillery Museum.
- Type: Heavy field howitzer
- Place of origin: France

Service history
- In service: 1910–1945
- Used by: Russian Empire; Soviet Union; Finland; Estonia
- Wars: World War I, Russian Civil War, Polish–Soviet War

Production history
- Designer: Schneider et Cie
- Manufacturer: Schneider et Cie, Putilov, Perm
- No. built: 381

Specifications
- Mass: 2,250 kilograms (4,960 lb)
- Barrel length: about 1.9 m (6 ft 3 in)
- Shell: separate-loading cased charge
- Shell weight: 43.5 kilograms (96 lb)
- Caliber: 152.4 millimetres (6.00 in)
- Breech: interrupted screw
- Recoil: Hydro-pneumatic
- Carriage: Box trail
- Elevation: -1° to +42°
- Traverse: 6°
- Muzzle velocity: 335 metres per second (1,100 ft/s)
- Maximum firing range: 8,700 metres (9,500 yd)

The 152 mm howitzer Model 1910 Schneider or, more properly, 6 dm polevaja gaubitsa sistemy Schneidera as it was designated in Tsarist times, was a French howitzer designed by Schneider et Cie. It was used by the Russian Empire and the Soviet Union during World War I, the Polish–Soviet War and the Russian Civil War. Finland captured nine during the Finnish Civil War, but did not use them during that conflict. They did see combat during the Winter War and the Continuation War.

== Description ==
The 152 mm howitzer Model 1910 Schneider was a conventional design for its time. It used a box carriage with wooden wheels, a gun shield to protect the crew and a hydro-pneumatic recoil system mounted under the barrel. It used an interrupted-screw breech with separate-loading ammunition; the shell being loaded first followed by the proper amount of propellant in a brass cartridge case.

== History and use ==
Schneider designed the howitzer to meet an Imperial Russian specification and it was accepted as the Model 1910 Schneider to distinguish it from the Krupp design also bought that same year. It was manufactured by the Putilov Factory and the Perm Artillery Factory. It was used on the Eastern Front during World War I and fought in the Polish–Soviet War and the Russian Civil War. Surviving examples were upgraded in the Thirties with a new carriage with pneumatic tires as the 152 mm gaubitsa obr. 1910/30.

Finnish weapons were used for training before the Winter War began, but were issued to Heavy Artillery Battalion 4 during the war. During the Continuation War they served with Heavy Artillery Battalion 30 although they were withdrawn relatively quickly because they were worn out and stored until 1966 against future need.

When World War I broke out this was the most modern howitzer design that France had available so it was re-barreled in 155 mm (6.1 in), the standard French caliber. Schneider later used the M1910 carriage for their Canon de 105 modèle 1913, Canon de 155 L modèle 1877/14, Canon de 155 C modèle 1915, Canon de 155 L modèle 1917 and Canon de 155 L modèle 1918 guns.

Estonia used the howitzer as railway artillery on an armored train in its Armored Train Regiment.

== See also ==
=== Weapons of comparable role, performance and era ===
- 120 mm Armata wz. 78/09/31 : Polish gun which used the carriage of the M1910.
- BL 6-inch 30 cwt howitzer : British equivalent
- Rimailho Model 1904TR : French equivalent
- 15 cm sFH 02 : German equivalent
- 6-inch howitzer M1908 : approximate US equivalent
