= Canon de 155 L Modele 1917 Schneider =

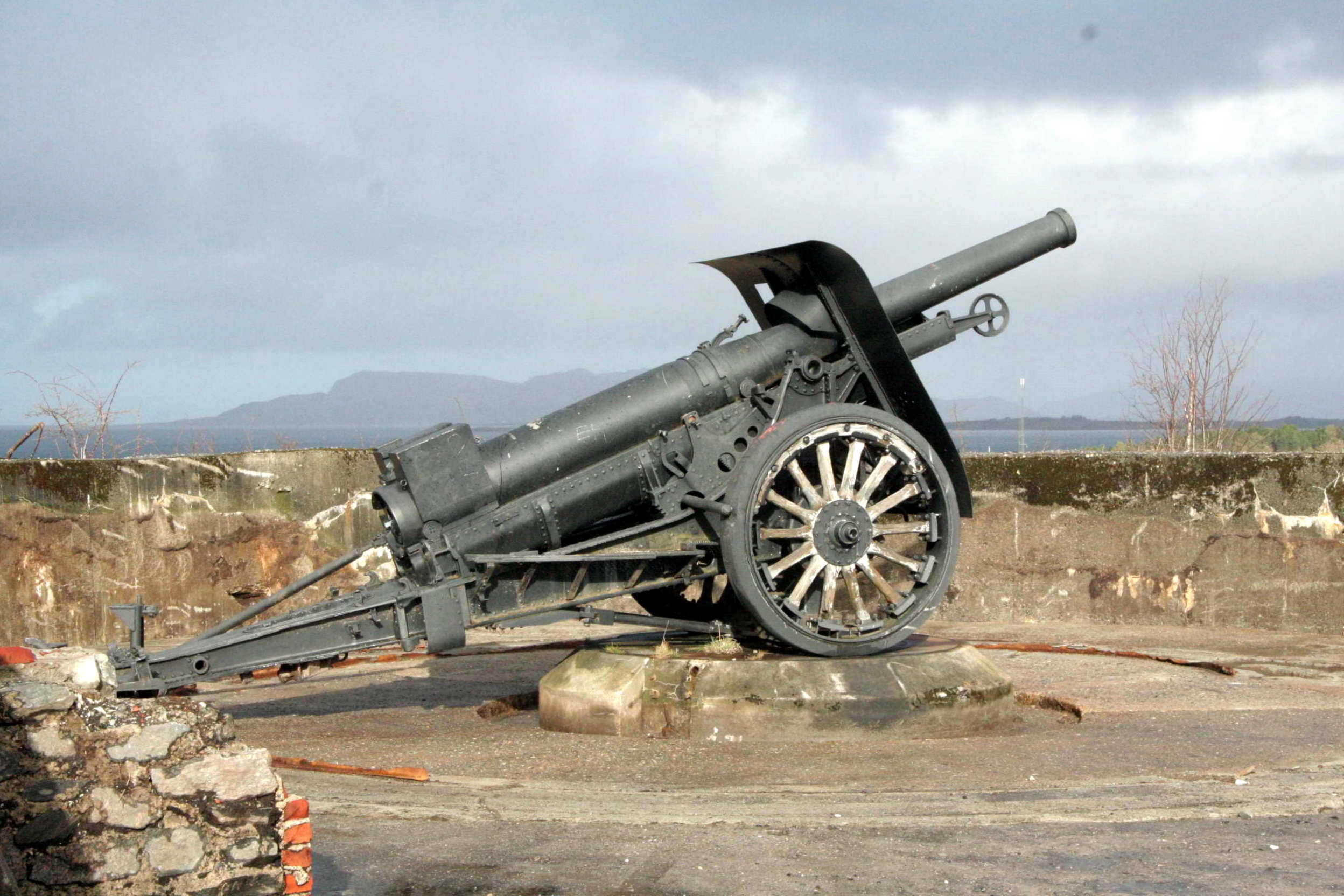
- A Canon de 155 L Modele 1917 Schneider at Florø, Norway.
- Place of origin: France

Service history
- In service: 1917–1945
- Used by: France; Belgium; Spanish Republic; Finland; Nazi Germany
- Wars: World War I World War II

Production history
- Designer: Schneider et Cie
- Designed: 1916
- Manufacturer: Schneider et Cie
- Produced: 1917
- No. built: 550

Specifications
- Mass: Travel one load: 9,900 kg (21,800 lb); Travel two loads: 12,170 kg (26,830 lb); Action: 8,956 kg (19,745 lb)
- Barrel length: 4.94 m (16 ft 2 in) 32 caliber
- Shell: Separate loading charge and projectile
- Shell weight: 43 kg (95 lb)
- Caliber: 155 mm (6.1 in)
- Breech: de Bange
- Recoil: Hydro-pneumatic
- Carriage: Box-trail
- Elevation: -5° to +40°
- Traverse: 4° 30'
- Muzzle velocity: 655 m/s (2,150 ft/s)
- Maximum firing range: 16 km (9.9 mi)

The Canon de 155 L Modele 1917 Schneider was a French heavy artillery piece designed and produced during the First World War. A number were still on hand during the Second World War and served in Belgian, French and German service.

== History ==
As the First World War settled into trench warfare on the Western Front, the light field guns that the combatants went to war with were beginning to show their limitations when facing an enemy who was now dug into prepared positions. Indirect fire, interdiction and counter-battery fire emphasized the importance of long-range heavy artillery.

In order to address the French Army's lack of long-range heavy artillery, Schneider placed a new barrel onto the carriage of the existing Canon de 155 mm L mle 1877/1914, which was itself based on the carriage of the 152 mm howitzer M1910 produced by Schneider for the Imperial Russian Army. The existing 27 caliber De Bange 155 mm mle 1877 barrel was replaced with a new 32 caliber barrel. For transport, the barrel could either be withdrawn from battery and fastened to the box trail for transport or removed and towed on its own trailer. The trade-off was each load weighed less, but more time was needed to reassemble the gun and bring it into action. A total of 550 conversions were completed, and after the First World War 192 were exported to Belgium.

Between the wars surviving guns were fitted with solid rubber tires for horse or motor traction. Surviving guns continued to serve into the Second World War and those taken over by the Germans were given the designations 15.5 cm K 416(f) and 15.5 cm K 431(b).

In 1941, Finland bought twelve captured field guns and large amounts of ammunition from the Germans. The Finnish military named these guns 155 K/17, but sometime they were also called 155 K/17-41. All twelve guns were issued to Super Heavy Artillery Battalion 1 ( Järeä Tykistöpatteristo 1) fighting in Karelian Isthmus. All guns were abandoned in June 1944 during the Finnish retreat.

== Photo Gallery ==
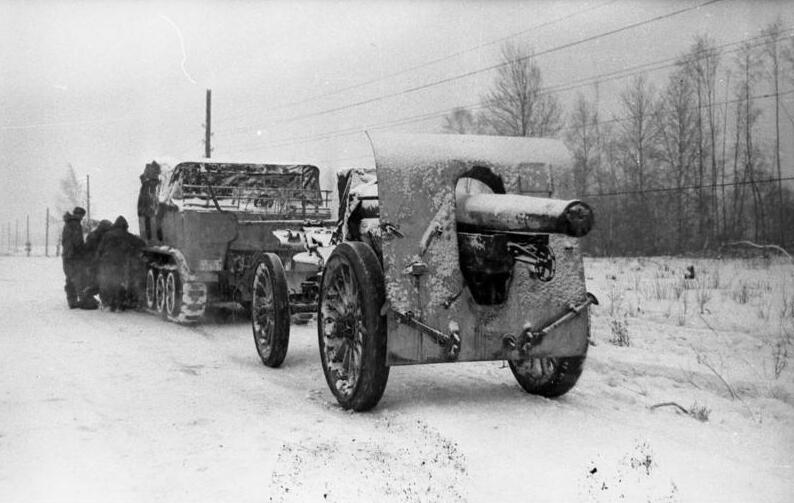
A gun in German service towed by a half-track in Northern Russia during the Winter of 1943.

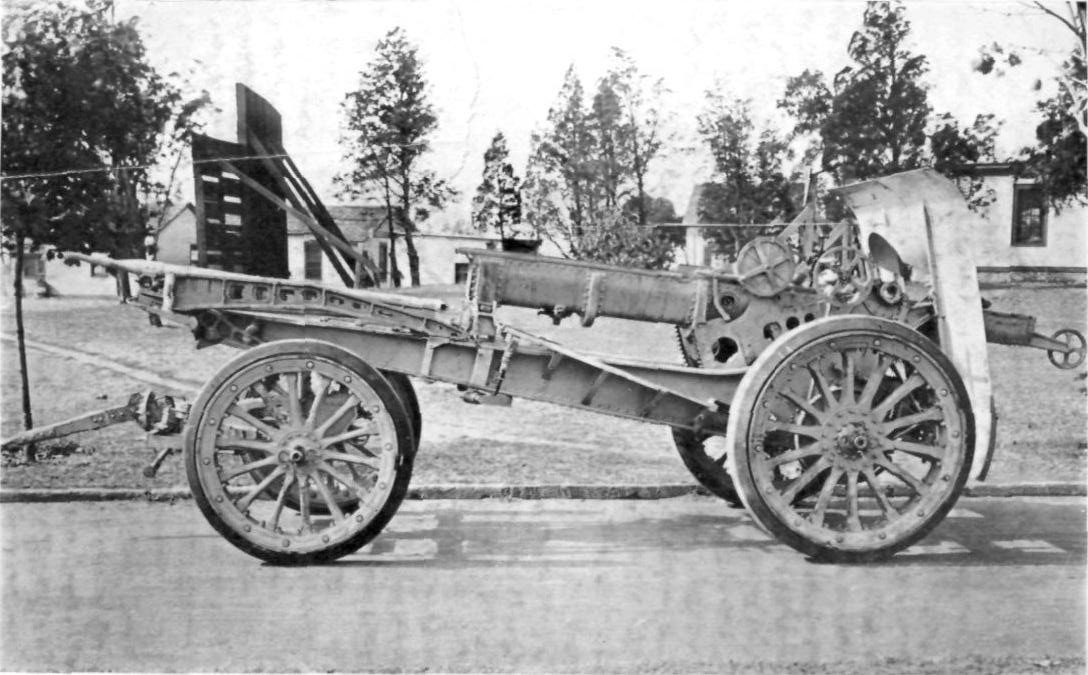
The carriage in travelling position.

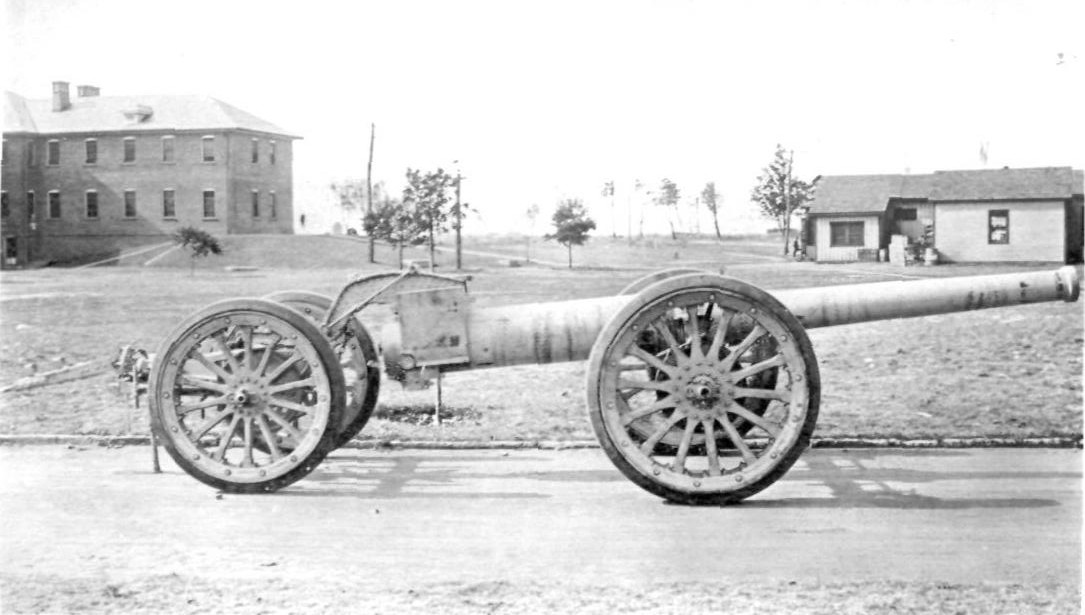
The gun barrel in travelling position.

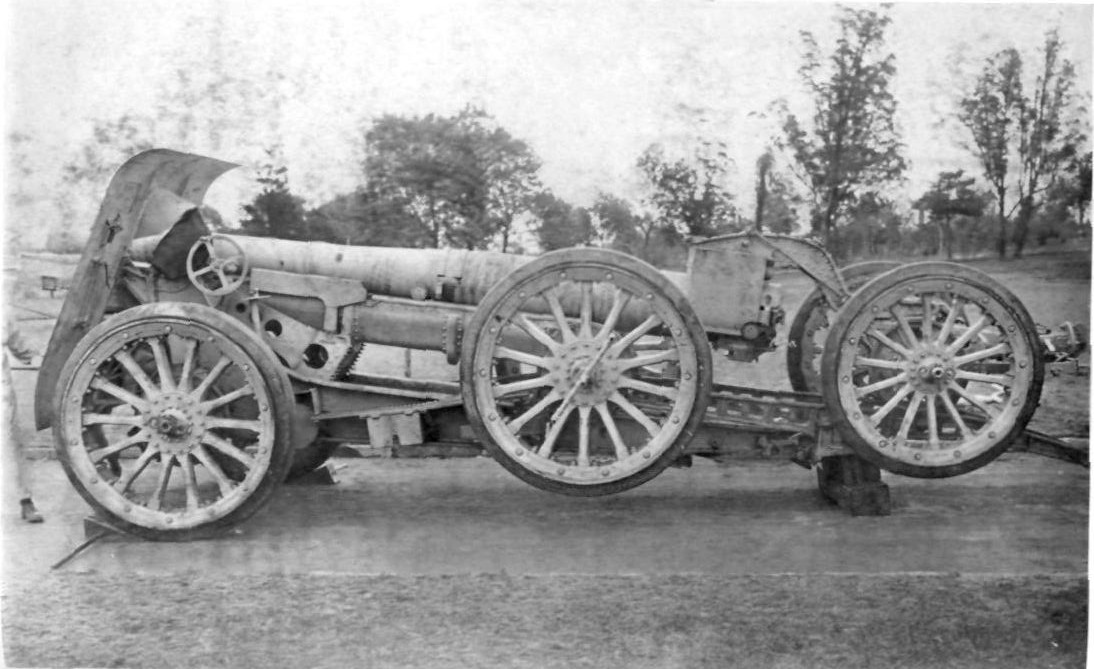
The complete gun on carriage, configuration used for short distance travels.
