= Canon de 155 L modèle 1877/14 Schneider =

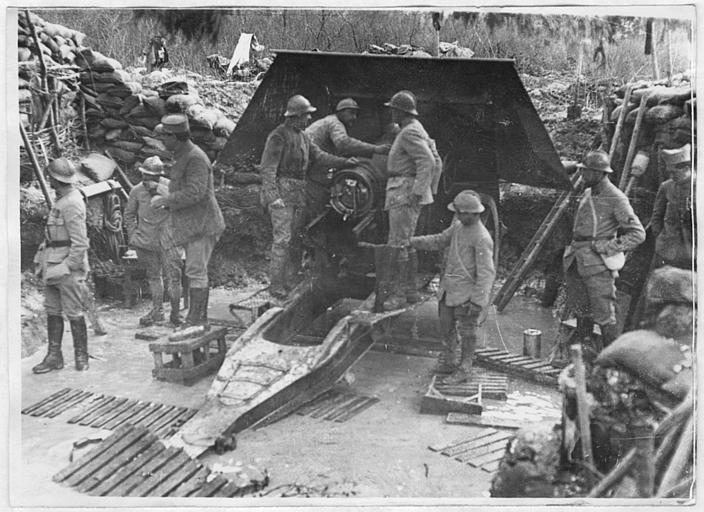
- Place of origin: France

Service history
- In service: 1916–1945
- Used by: France; Turkey; Nazi Germany
- Wars: World War I World War II

Production history
- Designer: Schneider et Cie
- Designed: 1913
- Manufacturer: Schneider et Cie
- Produced: 1916-1917
- No. built: 120

Specifications
- Mass: 6,010 kg (13,250 lb)
- Barrel length: 4.2 m (13 ft 9 in) 27 caliber
- Shell: Separate loading charge and projectile
- Shell weight: 43 kg (95 lb)
- Caliber: 155 mm (6.1 in)
- Breech: de Bange
- Recoil: Hydro-pneumatic
- Carriage: Single-axle Box-trail
- Elevation: -5° to +42°
- Traverse: 4°
- Rate of fire: 3 rpm
- Muzzle velocity: 561 m/s (1,840 ft/s)
- Maximum firing range: 13.9 km (8.6 mi)

The Canon de 155 L modèle 1877/14 Schneider was a French heavy artillery piece designed before and produced during the First World War. A number were still on hand during the Second World War and served in the French and German services.

== History ==
As the First World War settled into Trench Warfare on the Western Front the light field guns that the combatants went to war with were beginning to show their limitations when facing an enemy who was now dug into prepared positions. Indirect fire, interdiction and counter-battery fire emphasized the importance of long-range heavy artillery.

At the beginning of World War I, the French Army had about 1,300 de Bange 155 mm L modèle 1877 guns in its inventory, without a clear idea of how to replace them. Although accurate and reliable it lacked a modern recoil system, which meant that after each shot the gun rolled back onto a set of wooden ramps and had to be re-laid before the next shot.

In 1907 French Schneider et Cie and Russian Putilov companies signed an agreement for the production of the 152 mm howitzer M1910 for the Imperial Russian Army. The M1910 was a conventional design for its time with a box-trail carriage, steel-rimmed wooden wheels, a gun shield and a hydro-pneumatic recoil system. The performance of this gun impressed the French Army and calls for a French version gained pace.

In 1909 the French army invited the submission of proposals from state arsenals for fitting its de Bange cannons with modern recoil systems. Later in 1910, this was expanded to include competing proposals from private companies such as Schneider et Cie and Saint Chamond. In October 1913 the Schneider submission was chosen and in April 1914, an order for 120 guns was signed with deliveries scheduled between December 1915 and December 1917. With the outbreak of the First World War deliveries of the new gun designated the 155 mm L mle 1877/14 were delayed until February 1916.

== Design ==
The Schneider proposal of 1913 was to mount the barrel of the mle 1877 on the carriage of the M1910 so that its breech would open to the right, but only some of the first guns were produced with that configuration. Then, this was abandoned and the breech still opened to the left. However, this idea was later successfully revived in the Canon de 155 L modèle 1918 Schneider which mounted the mle 1877 barrel inverted on the carriage of the Canon de 155 C modèle 1917.

For transport, the barrel could either be withdrawn from battery and fastened to the box-trail or removed and towed on its own trailer. The trade-off was each load weighed less, but more time was needed to reassemble the gun and bring it into action. The mle 1877/14 was light enough to transport in one piece by two eight-horse teams or it could be towed in one piece by an artillery tractor. However, its wooden wheels and lack of sprung suspension limited towing speed to 5 km/h (3.1 mph).

== Service ==
The mle 1877/14 was considered an adequate gun which served throughout the First World War and provided the French Army with heavy artillery when needed most. Between wars, it was assigned to garrison duty and was used until the Second World War. Some received pneumatic tires, but the absence of a sprung suspension limited their towing speed. After the surrender of France in 1940 guns captured by the Germans were used as coastal artillery by occupation units with the designation 15.5 cm Kanone 422(f).

In 1940, France supplied Turkey with Mle 1877/14 guns, in sufficient numbers to equip two artillery battalions.

== Comparison to French contemporaries ==
- The mle 1877/14 weighed 960 kg (2,120 lb) more than the mle 1918, but its range of 13.6 km (8.5 mi) was roughly equal.
- The mle 1877/14 weighed less and was more mobile than the 155 L mle 1917, but its range was 4 km (2.5 mi) less and was a much older gun.
- The mle 1877/14 weighed 2,710 kg (5,970 lb) more than the 155 C modèle 1917, but it was less mobile and its range was only 2 km (1.2 mi) greater.
