= List of howitzers =

Howitzers are one of two primary types of field artillery. Historically, howitzers fired a heavy shell in a high-trajectory from a relatively short barrel and their range was limited but they were slightly more mobile than similar size field guns. Since the end of World War II, howitzers have gained longer barrels and hence increased range to become gun-howitzers.

== Towed howitzers ==
Caliber (mm)	Weapon name	Country of origin	Period
87.6	Ordnance QF 25-pounder gun-howitzer	United Kingdom	World War II, modern
87.6	Ordnance QF 25-pounder Short Mark 1 gun-howitzer	Australia	World War II
94	Ordnance QF 95 mm howitzer, infantry	United Kingdom	World War II
100	10 cm M. 14 Feldhaubitze	Austria-Hungary	World Wars I, II
100	Skoda houfnice vz 14/19	Austria-Hungary	World Wars I, II
100	10 cm houfnice vz. 28	Czechoslovakia	World War II
100	10 cm houfnice vz. 30	Czechoslovakia	World War II
100	Škoda 10 cm vz. 38 howitzer	Czechoslovakia	World War II
104	10 cm Feldhaubitze M 99	Austria-Hungary	World War I
104	Long Cecil	British Empire	Second Boer War
105	Canon de 105 court mle 1934 Schneider	France	World War II
105	Canon de 105 court mle 1935 B	France	World War II
105	GIAT LG1	France	Modern
105	KH178 howitzer	South Korea	Cold War
105	Pindad ME-105	Indonesia	Modern
105	Obice da 105/14	Kingdom of Italy	World War II
105	Type 91 10 cm howitzer	Japan	2nd Sino-Japanese War
105	10.5 cm Feldhaubitze M.12	German Empire/ Romania	World War I
105	10.5 cm MÁVAG 40.M	Kingdom of Hungary	World War II
105	10.5 cm MÁVAG 42.M	Kingdom of Hungary	World War II
105	10.5 cm Feldhaubitze 98/09	German Empire	World War I
105	10.5 cm leFH 16	German Empire	World War I
105	10.5 cm leFH 18	Nazi Germany	World War II
105	10.5 cm leFH 18M	Nazi Germany	World War II
105	10.5 cm leFH 18/40	Nazi Germany	World War II
105	G7 howitzer	South Africa	Modern
105	OTO Melara Mod 56	Italy	Malaya, Aden, Vietnam, Falklands
105	L118 light gun	United Kingdom	Falklands, Yugoslavia, Iraq, Afghanistan
105	L119 light gun	United Kingdom	Modern
105	105 mm howitzer M2, M101	United States	World War II, Vietnam
105	105 mm howitzer M3	United States	World War II
105	M102 howitzer	United States	Vietnam, Grenada, Gulf War, Iraq
105	M618A2	Thailand	Modern
105	10,5 cm haubits m/10	Sweden	World War I
105	Bofors 10.5 cm howitzer Model 1924	Sweden	World War II
105	10,5 cm haubits m/40	Sweden	World War II
105	M-56 howitzer	Yugoslavia	Cold War
105	Obusier de 105 modèle 1950	France	Cold War
114	QF 4.5 inch howitzer	United Kingdom	World Wars I, II
115	XM70E2 towed multiple launch rocket howitzer	United States	1959-63
120	12 cm felthaubits/m32	Norway	World War II
120	120 mm howitzer Model 1901	German Empire	Balkan Wars, World War I, Finnish Civil War, Hungarian–Romanian War
120	120 mm Krupp howitzer M1905	German Empire	World War I
120	Type 38 12 cm howitzer	Empire of Japan	World War I
120	Obusier de 120 mm modèle 1890	France	World War I
120	Obusier de 120 mm C mle 1897 Schneider-Canet	France	Balkan Wars, World War I
120	Obusier de 120 mm mle 15TR	France	World War I
122	122 mm howitzer M1909	Russian Empire	World War I
122	122 mm howitzer M1910	Russian Empire	World War I
122	122 mm howitzer M1910/30	Soviet Union	World War II
122	122 mm howitzer M1909/37	Soviet Union	World War II
122	122 mm howitzer M1938 (M-30)	Soviet Union	World War II
122	122 mm howitzer 2A18 (D-30)	Soviet Union	
122	D-74 122 mm field gun	Soviet Union	Cold War
122	Type 54 howitzer	China	Cold War
122	Type 83 howitzer	China	Modern
122	Type 60 howitzer	China	Cold War, modern
122	HM-40 howitzer	Iran	
127	BL 5 inch howitzer	United Kingdom	Second Boer War, World War I
130	130 mm towed field gun M1954 (M-46)	Soviet Union	Cold War
137.2	BL 5.4 inch howitzer	United Kingdom	World War I
149.1	15 cm fästningshaubits m/02	Sweden	World War I
149.1	15 cm haubits M/19	Sweden	World War I
149.1	15 cm 31.M	Sweden	World War II
149.1	15 cm haubits m/38	Sweden	World War II
149.1	15 cm haubits m/39	Sweden	World War II
149.1	Obice da 149/12	Kingdom of Italy	World Wars I, II
149.1	Obice da 149/19 modello 37	Kingdom of Italy	World War II
149.1	15 cm Mörser M 80	Austria-Hungary	World War I
149.1	15 cm schwere Feldhaubitze M 94	Austria-Hungary	World War I
149.1	15 cm schwere Feldhaubitze M 14	Austria-Hungary	World War I
149.1	15 cm schwere Feldhaubitze M. 15	Austria-Hungary	World War I
149.1	15 cm hruba houfnice vz. 25	Czechoslovakia	World War II
149.1	15 cm sIG 33	Nazi Germany	World War II
149.1	15 cm sFH 18	Nazi Germany	World War II
149.1	15 cm sFH 36	Nazi Germany	World War II
149.2	Type 38 15 cm howitzer	German Empire	2nd Sino-Japanese War
149.2	Type 4 15 cm howitzer	Japan	2nd Sino-Japanese War
149.2	Type 96 15 cm howitzer	Japan	2nd Sino-Japanese War
149.7	15 cm sFH 93	German Empire	World War I
149.7	15 cm sFH 02	German Empire	World War I
149.7	15 cm sFH 13	German Empire	World War I
150	Obusier de 15 cm TR Schneider-Canet-du-Bocage	Portugal, France	World War I
152.4	BL 6-inch 30 cwt howitzer	United Kingdom	Second Boer War, World War I
152.4	M1908 6-inch howitzer	United States	World war I
152.4	152 mm howitzer M1909	Russian Empire	World War I
152.4	152 mm howitzer M1910	Russian Empire	World War I
152.4	BL 6-inch 26 cwt howitzer	United Kingdom	World Wars I, II
152.4	152 mm howitzer M1909/30	Soviet Union	World War II
152.4	152 mm howitzer M1910/37	Soviet Union	World War II
152.4	152 mm gun M1935 (Br-2)	Soviet Union	World War II
152.4	152 mm howitzer-gun M1937 (ML-20)	Soviet Union	World War II
152.4	152 mm howitzer M1938 (M-10)	Soviet Union	World War II
152.4	152 mm howitzer M1943 (D-1)	Soviet Union	World War II
152.4	152 mm howitzer 2A65 Msta-B, M1987	Soviet Union	Cold War
152.4	152 mm towed gun-howitzer M1955 (D-20)	Soviet Union	Vietnam War, Six-day War, Iran-Iraq War, Syrian Civil War
152	152 mm towed gun-howitzer M1955 (D-20), M84 NORA field gun	Yugoslavia	
152	Type 66 howitzer	China	Cold War, modern
152	Type 83 howitzer	China	Modern
152	152 H 88	Finland	Cold War
155	Obusier de 155 mm C modèle 1881	France	World War I
155	Obusier de 155 mm C modèle 1890	France	World War I
155	Rimailho Model 1904TR	France	World War I
155	Canon de 155 C modèle 1915 St. Chamond	France	World Wars I, II
155	Canon de 155 C mle 1917 Schneider	France	World Wars I, II
155	M114 155 mm howitzer, M1	United States	World War II, 1980s, modern
155	155 mm gun M1, M2, M59, Long Tom	United States	World War II, Cold War, modern
155	FH70 howitzer	Germany, Italy, United Kingdom	Cold War, modern
155	Obusier de 155 mm Modèle 50	France	Cold War
155	Fälthaubits 77	Sweden	Cold War, modern
155	FH-88 howitzer	Singapore	Modern
155	FH-2000 howitzer	Singapore	Modern
155	SLWH Pegasus (Singapore light weight howitzer)	Singapore	Modern
155	G5 howitzer	South Africa	Cold War, modern
155	GC-45 howitzer	Canada	Cold War, modern
155	GC-45 howitzer, GHN-45 variant	South Africa, Iraq	Cold War, modern
155	KH179 howitzer	South Korea	Cold War
155	M198 howitzer	United States	Cold War, modern
155	M389 howitzer	Russia	
155	ATAGS	India	Modern
155	Bharat 52	India	Modern
155	Dhanush (howitzer)	India	Modern
155	HM-41	Iran	Modern
155	155 K 83	Finland	Modern
155	155 GH 52 APU	Finland	Modern
155	M777 howitzer	United Kingdom	Modern
155	Royal Ordnance light towed howitzer	United Kingdom	
155	Santa Bárbara Sistemas 155/52	Spain	Modern
155	Soltam M-68 howitzer	Israel	Cold War
155	Soltam M-71 howitzer	Israel	Cold War
155	ATHOS 2052	Israel	Modern
155	TRF1	France	Modern
155	Trajan Nexter	France	Modern
155	Norinco AH4 howitzer 155 mm	China	Modern
155	CITER 155 mm L33 gun	Argentina	Cold War, modern
155	Cañón 155 mm L 45 CALA 30	Argentina	Modern
155	Panter howitzer	Turkey	Modern
160	RML 6.3-inch howitzer	United Kingdom	Second Boer War
173	17 cm Kanone 18	Nazi Germany	World War II
180	18 cm kurze Kanone M 80	Austria-Hungary	1881-1918
180-203	S-23	Soviet Union	1955–1971
182.9	BL 7.2-inch howitzer Mk.I to Mk.6	United Kingdom	World War II
203	BL 8-inch howitzer Mk I – V	United Kingdom	World War I
203	BL 8-inch howitzer Mk VI – VIII	United Kingdom	World Wars I, II
203	M115 howitzer, 8 inch M1	United States	World War II, Cold War
203	203 mm howitzer M1931 (B-4)	Soviet Union	World War II
210	Obice da 210/22	Kingdom of Italy	World War II
210	21 cm Mörser M. 16/18	Austria-Hungary	World Wars I, II
210	21 cm Kanone 39	Nazi Germany	World War II
210	210 mm gun M1939 (Br-17)	Czechoslovakia /USSR	World War II
211	21 cm Mörser 99	German Empire	World War I
211	21 cm Versuchmörser 06	German Empire	World War I
211	21 cm Mörser 10	German Empire	World War I
211	21 cm Mörser 16	German Empire	World War I
211	21 cm Mrs 18	Nazi Germany	World War II
220	220 mm TR mle 1915/1916	France	World Wars I, II
233.7	BL 9.2-inch howitzer	UK	World Wars I, II
240	24 cm Mörser M 98	Austria-Hungary	World War I
240	M1918 240 mm howitzer	United States	World War I
240	240 mm howitzer M1	United States	World War II, Korean War
240	Type 45 240 mm howitzer	Japan	World War II
240	Type 96 24 cm howitzer	Japan	World War II
280	28 cm howitzer L/10	Japan	Russo-Japanese War, World Wars I, II
280	M65 atomic cannon, Atomic Annie	United States	Cold War
283	28 cm Haubitze L/12	German Empire	World War I
283	28 cm Haubitze L/14 i.R.	German Empire	World War I
305	Skoda 305 mm Model 1911	Austria-Hungary	World War I
305	Obice da 305/17	Kingdom of Italy	World War I
305	BL 12-inch howitzer	United Kingdom	World Wars I, II
305	305 mm howitzer M1939 (Br-18)	Czechoslovakia, Soviet Union	World War II
381	BL 15-inch howitzer	United Kingdom	World War I
420	42 cm Haubitze M-Gerät	German Empire	World War I
420	42 cm Haubitze M. 14/16/17	Austria-Hungary	World Wars I, II

== Self-propelled howitzers ==
Caliber (mm)	Weapon name	Country of origin	Entered service
75	M8 howitzer motor carriage	United States	1942
155	AHS Krab	Poland	2017
75	Semovente da 75/18	Kingdom of Italy	1942
75	Sav m/43	Sweden	1944
83.8	Birch gun	United Kingdom	1928
87.6	Bishop	United Kingdom	1942
87.6	Sexton	Canada	1943
94	Ordnance QF 95 mm howitzer on Cromwell, Centaur and Churchill CS tanks	United Kingdom	1944
105	Sav m/43	Sweden	1944
105	Ikv 102/103	Sweden	1953
105	FV433 Abbot SPG	United Kingdom	1965
105	K105A1	South Korea	2022
105	StuH 42	Nazi Germany	1943
105	Zrínyi II	Kingdom of Hungary	1943
105	M7 Priest	United States	1942
105	Wespe	Nazi Germany	1943
105	Type 74 105 mm self-propelled howitzer	Japan	1975
105	M37 howitzer motor carriage	United States	1950
105	M52 howitzer motor carriage	United States	1955
105	M108 self-propelled howitzer	United States	1962
105	Mk 61 105 mm self-propelled howitzer	France	1958
114	BT-42	Finland/Soviet Union	1943
122	2S1 Gvodzika / M1974	Soviet Union	1972
122	Type 54 SPA	China	1954
122	Raad 1	Iran	1996
122	PLZ-07	China	2009
122	PCL-09	China	2010
122	Type 85 SPA	China	1985
122	PLZ-89	China	1999
122	PCL-171	China	2020
122	PCL-161	China	2020
122	SORA self-propelled howitzer	Serbia	2009 - Prototype
122	Mareșal	Kingdom of Romania	1944 - Prototype/Cancelled
130	M-46 Catapult	India	1981
150	Bison	Nazi Germany	1940
150	15cm sFH13/1 (Sf) auf Geschützwagen Lorraine Schlepper (f).	Nazi Germany	1940
150	Sturmpanzer II	Nazi Germany	1942
150	Grille	Nazi Germany	1943
150	Hummel	Nazi Germany	1943
150	Type 4 Ho-Ro	Japan	1944
152	Type 83 SPH	China	1983
152	Nora B-52	Serbia	2006
152	2S43 Malva	Russia	2023
152	152 mm ShKH-77 Dana (SpGH Mk.1977)	Czechoslovakia	1981
152	2S5 Giatsint	Soviet Union	1978
152.4	2S3 Akatsiya / M1973	Soviet Union	1971
152.4	2S19 MSTA-S	Soviet Union	1988
152.4 or 155	2S35 Koalitsiya-SV	Russia	2023
155	2S22 Bohdana	Ukraine	2022
155	155 mm ShKH Zuzana 2000 (SpGH Model 2000)	Slovakia	1998
155	Zuzana 2	Slovakia	2019
155	Type 19	Japan	2018
155	EVA	Slovakia	2015
155	HM-41	Iran	2017
155	ShKH EVA M2	Slovakia	2023 - Prototype
155	Artillery Gun Module	Germany	2022
155	Bandkanon 1	Sweden	1965
155	Archer artillery system	Sweden	2016
155	AS-90	United Kingdom	1992
155	CAESAR	France	2008
155	KRAB howitzer 155 mm	Poland	2008
155	AMX-13 Mk F3	France	1962
155	Raad 2	Iran	1997
155	K9 Thunder	South Korea	1999
155	M12 gun motor carriage	United States	1942
155	M40 gun motor carriage	United States	1945
155	M41 howitzer motor carriage	United States	1944
155	M44 self-propelled howitzer	United States	1954
155	M52 self-propelled howitzer	Turkey / United States	1952
155	M53 self-propelled gun	United States	1952
155	M109 series self-propelled howitzer	United States	1963
155	XM2001 Crusader	United States	2002 - Cancelled
155	Palmaria	Italy	1977
155	PzH 2000	Germany	1998
155	Rascal light SPH	Israel	1985
155	ATMOS 2000	Israel	2001
155	SSPH Primus	Singapore	2002
155	G6 howitzer	South Africa	1988
155	Type 75 155 mm self-propelled howitzer	Japan	1975
155	Type 99 155 mm self-propelled howitzer	Japan	1999
155	Type 88 / PLZ-45	China	1997
155	PLZ-05	China	2008
155	PCL-181	China	2019
155	AMX 30 AuF1	France	1977
155	T-155 Firtina	Turkey / South Korea	2001
155	TAM VCA Palmaria	Argentina / Italy	1981
155	Slammer (Sholef)	Israel	1984
170	M-1978 Koksan	North Korea	1978
175	M107 self-propelled gun	United States	1962
203	2S7 Pion	Soviet Union	1976
203	M43 howitzer motor carriage	United States	1945
203	M55 self-propelled howitzer	United States	1952
203	M110 self-propelled howitzer	United States	1963
210	Al-Fao	Iraq	1990 - Cancelled
240	T92 howitzer motor carriage	United States	1945
280	Mortier 280 mm TR de Schneider sur affût-chenilles St Chamond	France	1919
406	2A3 Kondensator 2P	Soviet Union	1956
420	2B1 Oka	Soviet Union	1957 - Cancelled
120	2S40 Floks	Russia	2023

== Fixed howitzers ==
Caliber (mm)	Weapon name	Country of origin	Usage
53	5,3 cm L24 Kanone 1887	Switzerland	19th century
75	7,5 cm L30 Kanone 1903 (Dailly-Aiguille, based on Krupp Model 03)	Switzerland	early 20th century
75	7,5 cm L30 Befestigungskanone 38.	Switzerland	World War II
75	7,5 cm L30 Befestigungskanone 39.	Switzerland	World War II
84	8,4 cm Kanone 1871/88	Switzerland	19th century
84	8,4 cm Krupp Kanone 1880 (Dailly, Airolo, Stuei)	Switzerland	19th century
105	10,5 cm L42 Festungkanone 1935, K+W Thun.	Switzerland	World War II
105	10,5 cm L52 Turmkanone 1939	Switzerland	World War II
149.1	15 cm fästningshaubits m/06	Sweden	World War I
150	Krupp 1877 (Dailly)	Switzerland	19th century
150	15 cm L42 Bunkerkanone 1942/46, K+W Thun,	Switzerland	World War II
150	15 cm L42 Turmkanone 1958, K+W Thun.	Switzerland	Cold war
155	Bison Fortress artillery 93 (15.5 cm L52)	Switzerland	Modern
305	30,5 cm kusthaubits m/16	Sweden	World War I
406	16-inch howitzer M1920	United States	World War II
420	42 cm Gamma-Gerät	German EmpireNazi Germany	World War I World War II
