= Weaponry of the Austro-Hungarian Empire =

== Small arms ==
=== Long arms ===
Name	Manufacturer	Introduced
M1722 Ordinäre Flinte	Private manufacturers	1722
M1754 Commiss Flinte	Private manufacturers	1754
M1759 Jäger rifle	Private manufacturers	1759
M1759 Trombon	Private manufacturers	1759
M1767 Commiss Flinte	Private manufacturers	1767
M1768 Doppelstutzen	Private manufacturers	1769
Infanteriegewehr M1774 musket	Private manufacturers	1770
M1779 Hussar carbine	Private manufacturers	1779
Girandoni air rifle	Private manufacturers	1780
M1781 Trombon	Private manufacturers	1781
Infanteriegewehr M1784 musket	Private manufacturers	1784
M1788 Cavalry rifle	Private manufacturers	1788
M1789 Cavalry rifle	Private manufacturers	1789
M1795 Jäger rifle	Private manufacturers	1795
M1796 Jäger rifle	Private manufacturers	1796
Infanteriegewehr M1798 musket	Private manufacturers	1798
M1798 Cavalry rifle	Private manufacturers	1798
M1798 Dragoon carbine	Private manufacturers	1798
M1798 Hussar carbine	Private manufacturers	1798
M1799 Jäger rifle	Private manufacturers	1799
Infanteriegewehr M1807 musket	Private manufacturers	1807
M1807 Jäger rifle	Private manufacturers	1807
M1807 Jäger carbine	Private manufacturers	1807
Infanteriegewehr M1828 musket	Private manufacturers	1828
Console percussion musket	Imperial Armoury, Vienna, Private Manufacturers	1835
Augustin Infantry Musket Model 1842	Private manufacturers	1842
Lorenz rifle	Imperial Armoury, Vienna, Private Manufacturers	1854
Wänzl rifle	Œ.W.G.	1867
M1867 Werndl–Holub	Œ.W.G.	1867
Mannlicher M1886	Œ.W.G.	1886
Steyr–Mannlicher M1888	Œ.W.G. Fegyver- és Gépgyár	1888
Mannlicher M.13 (Gew.88)	Œ.W.G.	1888
Mannlicher M1890 carbine	Œ.W.G.	1890
Mannlicher Model 1893 self-loading rifle	Œ.W.G.	1893
Steyr–Mannlicher M1895	Œ.W.G. Fegyver- és Gépgyár	1895
Turkish Mauser M1903	Waffenfabrik Mauser	1903
Mannlicher–Schönauer	Œ.W.G.	1903
Krnka-Hirtenberg	Hirtenberg Ammunition Factory	1909
Repetiergewehr M.14	Œ.W.G.	1914

=== Side arms ===
Name	Manufacturer	Introduced
Ganahl Revolver	K. u k. priv. Maschinen-Fabrik	1850
Gasser M1870	Leopold Gasser Waffenfabrik	1870
Mannlicher M1894	Fabrique D'Armes de Neuhausen, Dreysey	1894
Roth-Theodorovic pistol	Œ.W.G.	1895
Mannlicher M1896	Œ.W.G.	1896
Rast & Gasser M1898	Rast and Gasser	1898
Mannlicher M1901	Œ.W.G.	1901
Mannlicher M1905	Œ.W.G.	1905
Roth–Steyr M1907	Œ.W.G. Fegyver- és Gépgyár	1907
Steyr Pieper M1908	Œ.W.G. Steyr	1908
Steyr Pieper M1909	Österreichische Waffenfabriks Steyr	1909
Steyr M1912	Œ.W.G.	1912
Frommer Stop	Fegyver- és Gépgyár	1912

=== Machine guns ===
Name	Manufacturer	Introduced
Salvator-Dormus M1893	Škoda Works	1893
Madsen	Dansk Rekyl Riffel Syndikat	1901
Odkolek M1899	Adolf Odkolek von Újezd	1902
Skoda M1902	Škoda Works	1902
Schwarzlose MG M.07/12	Œ.W.G Steyr Fegyver- és Gépgyár	1905
Skoda M1909 machine gun	Škoda Works	1909
Skoda M1913	Škoda Works	1913

== Artillery ==
Name	Caliber	Introduced	Type
7 cm Gebirgsgeschütz M 75	66 mm	1875	Mountain
12 cm Kanone M 80	120 mm	1881	Siege
15 cm Kanone M 80	150 mm	1881	Siege
18 cm kurze Kanone M 80	180 mm	1881	Siege
15 cm SK L/35	149.1 mm	1883	Naval
15 cm Mörser M 80	149 mm	1885	Siege
15 cm schwere Feldhaubitze M 94	149 mm	1894	Howitzer
9 cm Feldkanone M 75/96	87 mm	1898	Field
15 cm SK L/40	149.1 mm	1898	Naval
Škoda 24 cm L/40 K97	238 mm	1898	Naval
10 cm Gebirgshaubitze M 99	104 mm	1899	Mountain
24 cm Mörser M 98	240 mm	1900	Siege
8 cm Feldkanone M. 99	76.5 mm	1901	Field
7 cm Gebirgsgeschütz M 99	70 mm	1902	Mountain
10 cm Feldhaubitze M 99	104 mm	1903	Field
19 cm vz. 1904	190 mm	1904	Naval
8 cm FK M. 5	76.5 mm	1907	Field
10 cm Gebirgshaubitze M 8	104 mm	1908	Mountain
7 cm K10	66 mm	1910	Naval
10 cm K10	100 mm	1910	Naval
15 cm K10	150 mm	1910	Naval
Škoda 7.5 cm d/29 Model 1911	75 mm	1911	Howitzer
Skoda 305 mm Model 1911	305 mm	1911	Siege
Skoda 30.5 cm /45 K10	305 mm	1911	Naval
10 cm M. 14 Feldhaubitze	100 mm	1914	Field, Mountain
42 cm Haubitze M. 14/16	420 mm	1914	Siege
3.7 cm Infanteriegeschütz M.15	37 mm	1915	Infantry
Skoda 75 mm Model 15	75 mm	1915	Mountain
15 cm schwere Feldhaubitze M 14	149.1 mm	1915	Howitzer
Skoda 100 mm Model 1916	100 mm	1916	Mountain
10.4 cm Feldkanone M. 15	105 mm	1916	Field
15 cm schwere Feldhaubitze M. 15	149.1 mm	1916	Howitzer
15 cm Autokanone M. 15/16	152.4 mm	1916	Field
21 cm Mörser M. 16/18	210 mm	1916	Siege
24 cm Kanone M. 16	240 mm	1916	Siege
35 cm Marinekanone L/45 M. 16	350 mm	1916	Naval, Siege
38 cm Belagerungshaubitze M 16	380 mm	1916	Siege
8 cm FK M. 17	76.5 mm	1917	Field
8 cm FK M 18	76.5 mm	1918	Field

== Warships ==
=== Battleships ===
Battleships

=== Cruisers ===
Cruisers

=== Destroyers ===
Destroyers

=== U-boats ===
U-boats

=== Ironclads ===
Ironclads

=== Ship of the line and frigates ===
Ship of the Line and Frigates
