= Rimailho Model 1904TR =

155mm Rimailho Howitzer Model 1904TR
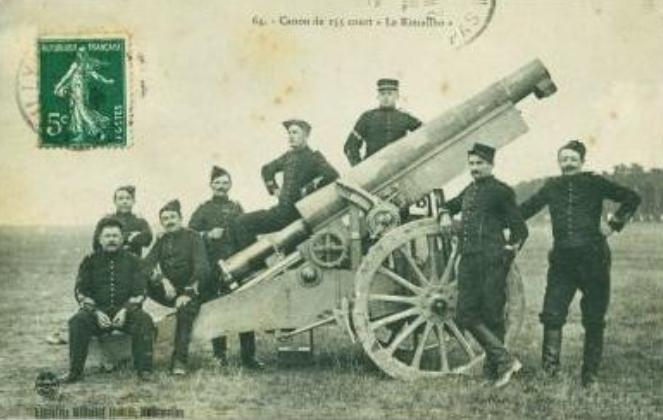
- Type: Howitzer
- Place of origin: France

Service history
- Used by: France
- Wars: World War I

Production history
- Designer: Emile Rimailho
- Designed: 1904
- No. built: ≈120

Specifications
- Mass: 3,200 kg (7,100 lb)
- Barrel length: 2.4 m (7 ft 10 in) L/15.5
- Caliber: 155 mm (6.1in)
- Recoil: Hydro-pneumatic
- Carriage: Box trail
- Elevation: 0° to +41°
- Traverse: 6°
- Rate of fire: 15 rpm
- Muzzle velocity: 320 m/s (1,000 ft/s)
- Maximum firing range: 6,000 m (6,600 yd)

The 155 mm Rimailho Howitzer Model 1904TR (or just the 155 CTR) was a medium howitzer used by France before and during World War I.

== Background ==
The name Rimailho comes from the designer of the gun Captain Emile Rimailho a French artillery officer who was also involved in the design and testing of the famous Canon de 75 modèle 1897. The gun was designed in 1904 and the TR in the name means 'Tir Rapide' or Rapid Fire in English. Captain Rimailho's goal was to produce a medium artillery piece capable of a rate of fire equal to the modèle (Mle) 1897, which was no small feat for a gun of that size. In service a well-trained gun crew could achieve a rate of 15 rounds per minute, however the 1904TR was mechanically complex and its high rate of fire placed a great deal of stress on the gun.

== Theory of operation ==
- After each round is fired the gun's breech is opened automatically .
- While the gun runs back into battery the breech is held open.
- The crew places a cartridge and shell onto the loading tray beneath the breach.
- The motion of the gun returning to battery slides the loading tray up into place and the firing lever is cocked.
- The firing lever is pulled and the cartridge and shell are rammed into the breech.
- The breech then closes and the gun fires.

== History ==
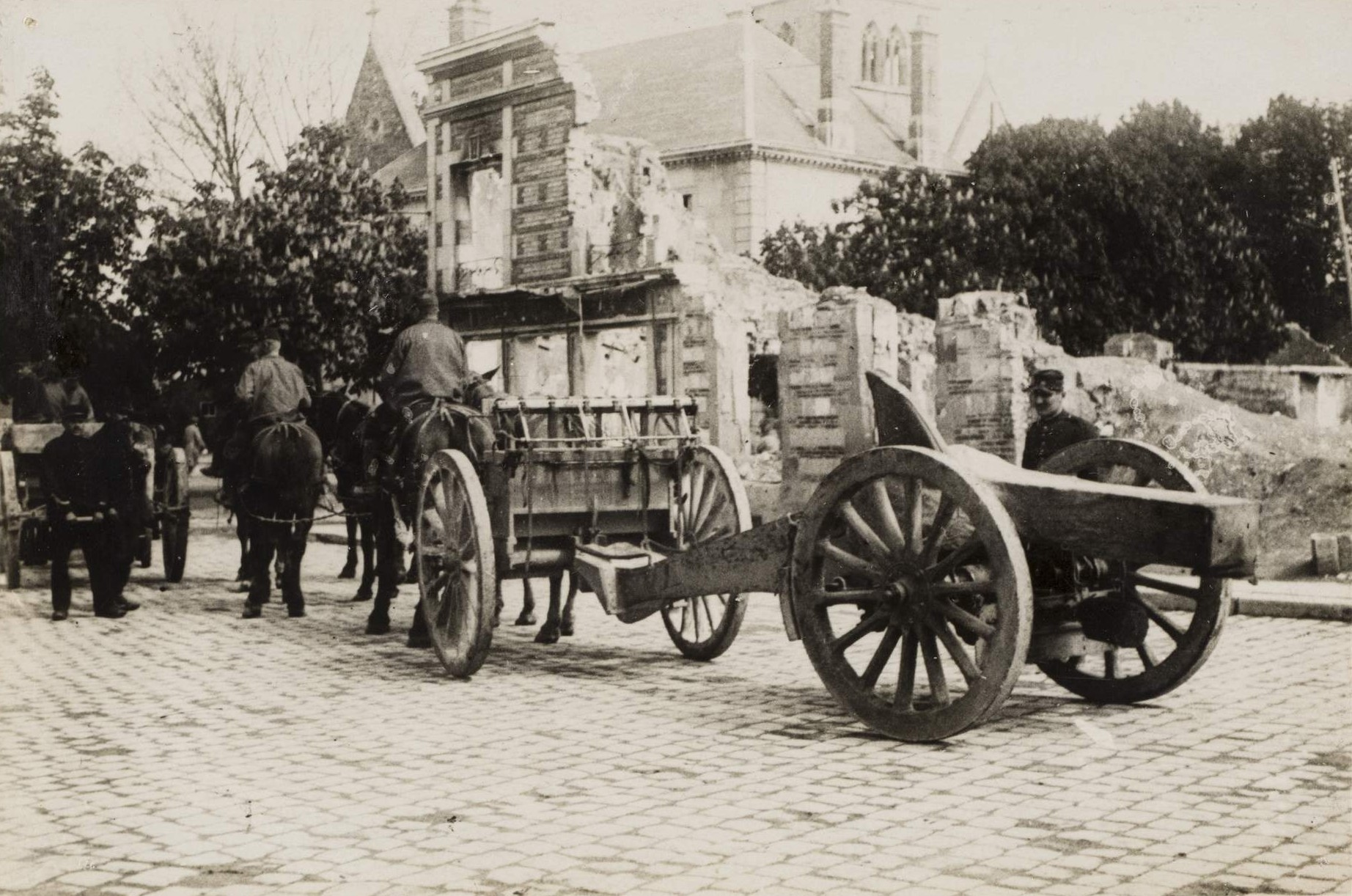
155 Rimailho near Reims, being moved to the front during World War One.

A firing demonstration was held at the French War College at Langres on September 4, 1906 with the French Minister of War, Eugène Etienne in attendance. The 1904TR tested against existing 155 mm and 270 mm artillery pieces and judged to be superior when firing against hardened concrete fortifications. In 1907 the 1904TR was put into production and eventually five artillery regiments were equipped with the 1904TR. Each 1904TR battery consisted of two guns accompanied by three ammunition wagons for each gun.

In August 1914, the French army had in service 104 pieces of 155 CTR, in 26 batteries.

At the outbreak of war the 1904TR was one of the few large calibre modern artillery pieces available to the French Army. The French had neglected large calibre guns in favor of smaller and lighter artillery such as the Mle 1897. The Mle 1897 fit the French Army's doctrine of offence and manoeuver. This doctrine placed a great deal of emphasis on conducting battles in the open with room for cavalry and infantry to manoeuver and supported largely with direct-fire weapons. When the Western Front stagnated and both sides became entrenched in 1915 the French Army was at a disadvantage due to their lack of long range, large calibre artillery capable of high-angle fire. Although the 1904TR had a higher rate of fire than its German competitors such as the 15 cm sFH 02 and 15 cm sFH 13, the German guns outranged it and by 1916 the 1904TR no longer had sufficient range. The 1904 TR's carriage was also dated at the time of its introduction being patterned on older siege howitzers. The 1904TR was supplemented from early 1916 by the Canon de 155 C modèle 1915 Schneider and the 1904TR was replaced after 1917 by the Canon de 155 C modèle 1917 Schneider.

Due to their short range, most of the 155 CTR were used with powerful charges. This resulted in rapid wear of their barrels. None was in service at the end of the war. Only one surviving example is known of today at the Royal Museum of the Armed Forces and Military History in Brussels.

== See also ==
=== Weapons of comparable role, performance and era ===
- 15 cm schwere Feldhaubitze M 94 : Austro-Hungarian equivalent
- BL 6-inch 30 cwt howitzer : British equivalent
- 15 cm sFH 02 : German equivalent
- 6 inch field howitzer M-1908 : approximate US equivalent
