= Five nines =

Five nines, commonly taken to mean "99.999%", may refer to:

- High availability of services, when a service is available for 99.999% of the time, or around 5 minutes of downtime per year
- Nine (purity), a 99.999% pure substance
- German 15 cm (5.9 in) artillery shells used in World War I

== See also ==
- 0.999..., a repeating decimal that is an alternative way of writing the number 1.
