= M1908 =

M1908 may refer to:

- M1908 pistol
- M1908 6-inch howitzer
- M1908 variant of the M1890 12-inch mortar
- M1908 variant of the M1897 6-inch gun
- M1908 variant of the M1903 Colt pocket hammerless
- M1908 Mondragón rifle, a Mexican-designed, early semi-automatic rifle
