= RML 6.3-inch howitzer =

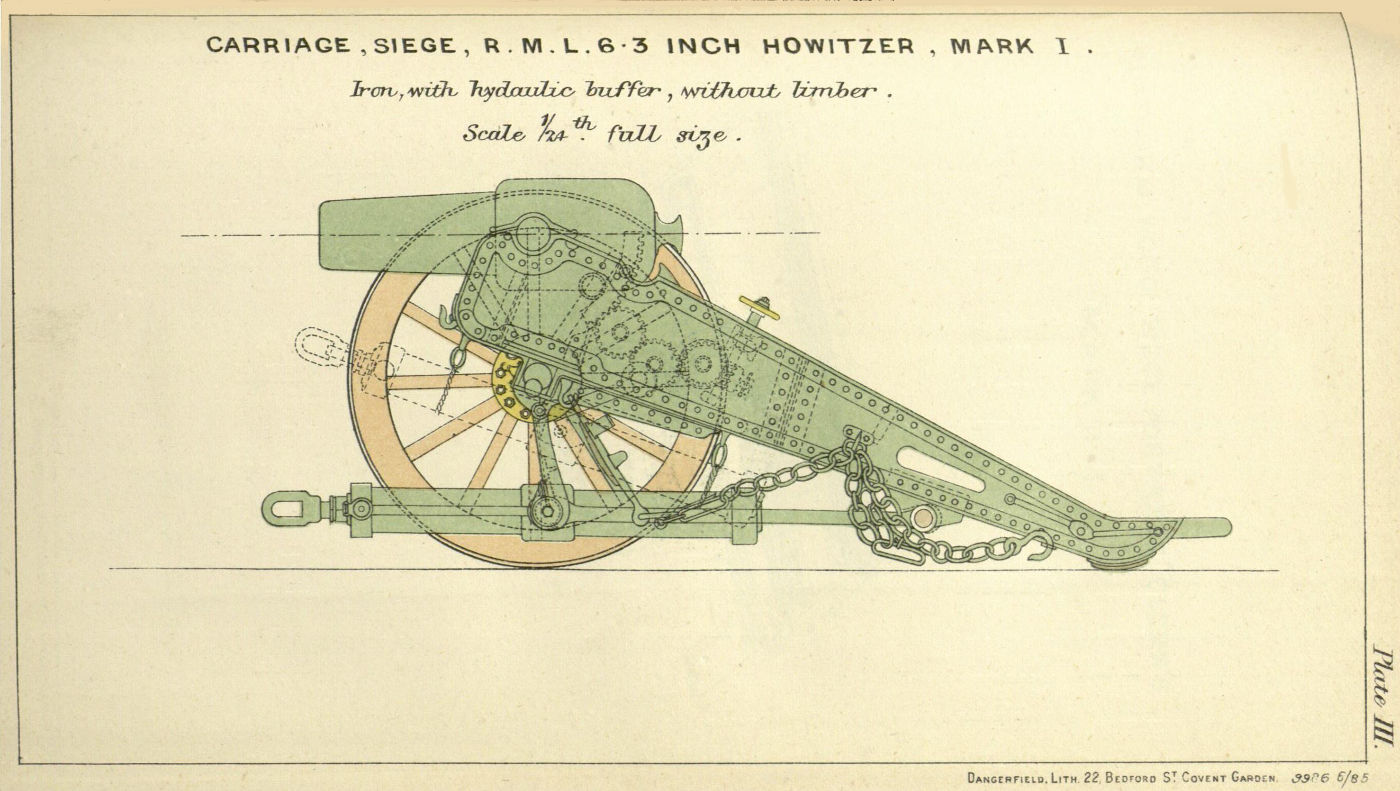
- RML 6.3 inch howitzer on siege carriage Mark I, diagram from Handbook, War Office, 1886
- Type: Howitzer
- Place of origin: United Kingdom

Service history
- Used by: British Empire
- Wars: Anglo-Egyptian War; Second Boer War

Production history
- Produced: 1878

Specifications
- Mass: 2,016 lb (914 kg) barrel
- Barrel length: 3 feet 9 inches (1.1 m) bore (7.14 calibres)
- Shell: 70 lb (32 kg)
- Calibre: 6.3 inches (160 mm)
- Action: RML
- Traverse: nil
- Muzzle velocity: 751 ft/s (229 m/s)
- Effective firing range: 4,000 yards (3,700 m)

The RML 6.3-inch howitzer was a British rifled muzzle-loading "siege" or "position" howitzer/mortar proposed in 1874 and finally introduced in 1878 as a lighter version of the successful 8-inch howitzer that could be carried by the existing 40-pounder gun carriage.

By 1880, the RML 6.3 in (16 cm) was superseded by a longer 6.6 in (17 cm) howitzer with a higher muzzle velocity.

== Description ==
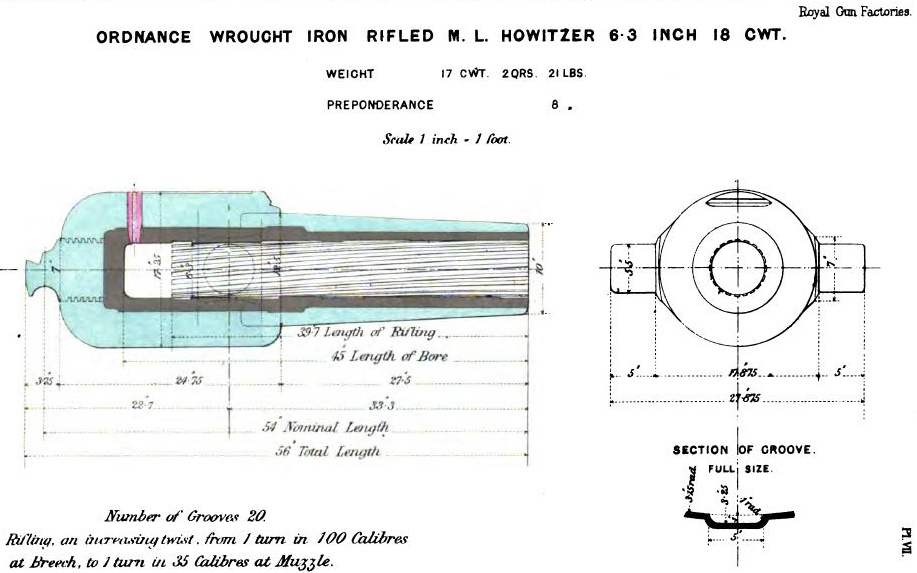
Barrel construction

The barrel consisted of an inner "A" tube of toughened mild steel, surrounded by wrought-iron "B" tube and jacket.

Rifling was of the "polygroove" type, with 20 grooves and a twist increasing from 1 turn in 100 calibres (i.e. 630 in (1,600 cm)) to 1 in 35 (i.e. 220 in (560 cm)).

The howitzers could be mounted on either a travelling siege carriage, which enabled them to be semi-mobile, or on a steel bed, which were then positioned in fixed defences or fortifications.

== Operational use ==
Ten 6.3 in (16 cm) Howitzers were landed in Egypt in 1882 to form part of a Royal Artillery Siege Train during the Anglo-Egyptian War, however they were not used in action. Many were mounted in Forts and batteries around the United Kingdom as part of the fixed defences scheme. Most were dismounted and scrapped after 1902.

A number of RML 6.3 in (16 cm) howitzers were used by the British forces during the Second Boer War, normally mounted on 40 pr RML carriages.

== Ammunition ==
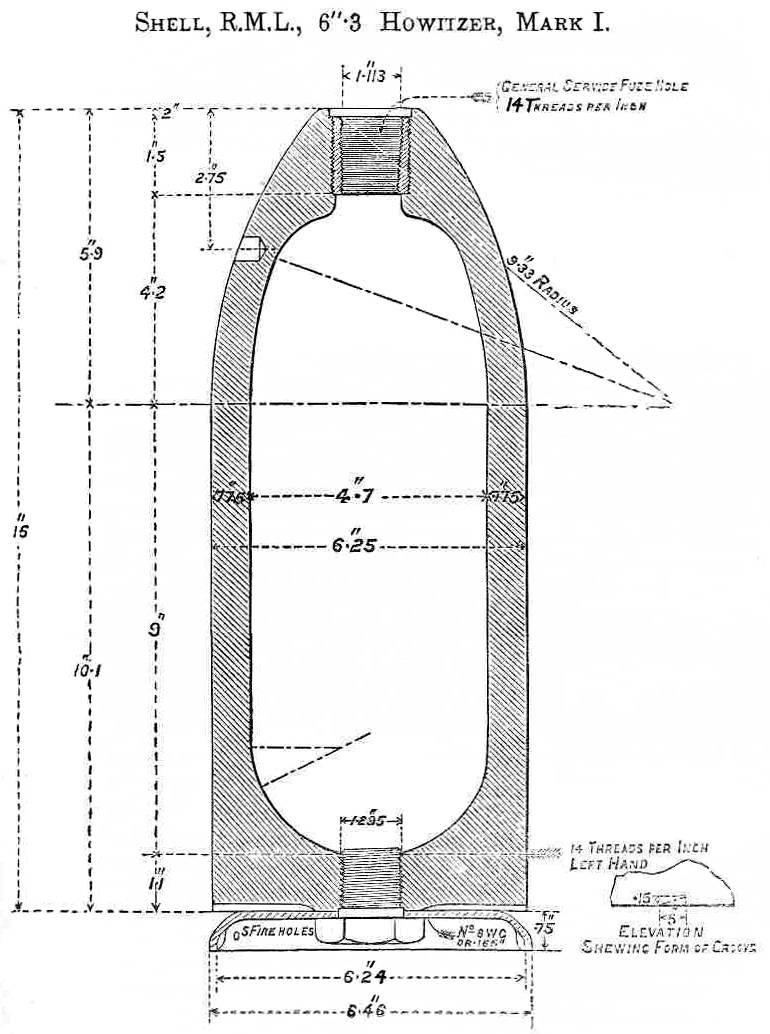
Mk I studless common shell, 1886

The 6.3 in (16 cm) Howitzer used a number of different types of projectiles, depending on the selected target. This included common shell for use against buildings, earthworks or vehicles, or shrapnel shell for use against 'soft' targets, such as infantry or cavalry on open ground. Case shot could be used against soft targets at close range, typically less than 400 yd (0.37 km).

The howitzer used black powder propellant, in silk bags which were ignited by friction tube.

The gun was the first British rifled muzzle-loader to dispense entirely with studs on shells to impart spin : its shells from the beginning had gas checks attached to their base which expanded and engaged with rifling on firing to impart spin to the shell.

== Surviving examples ==
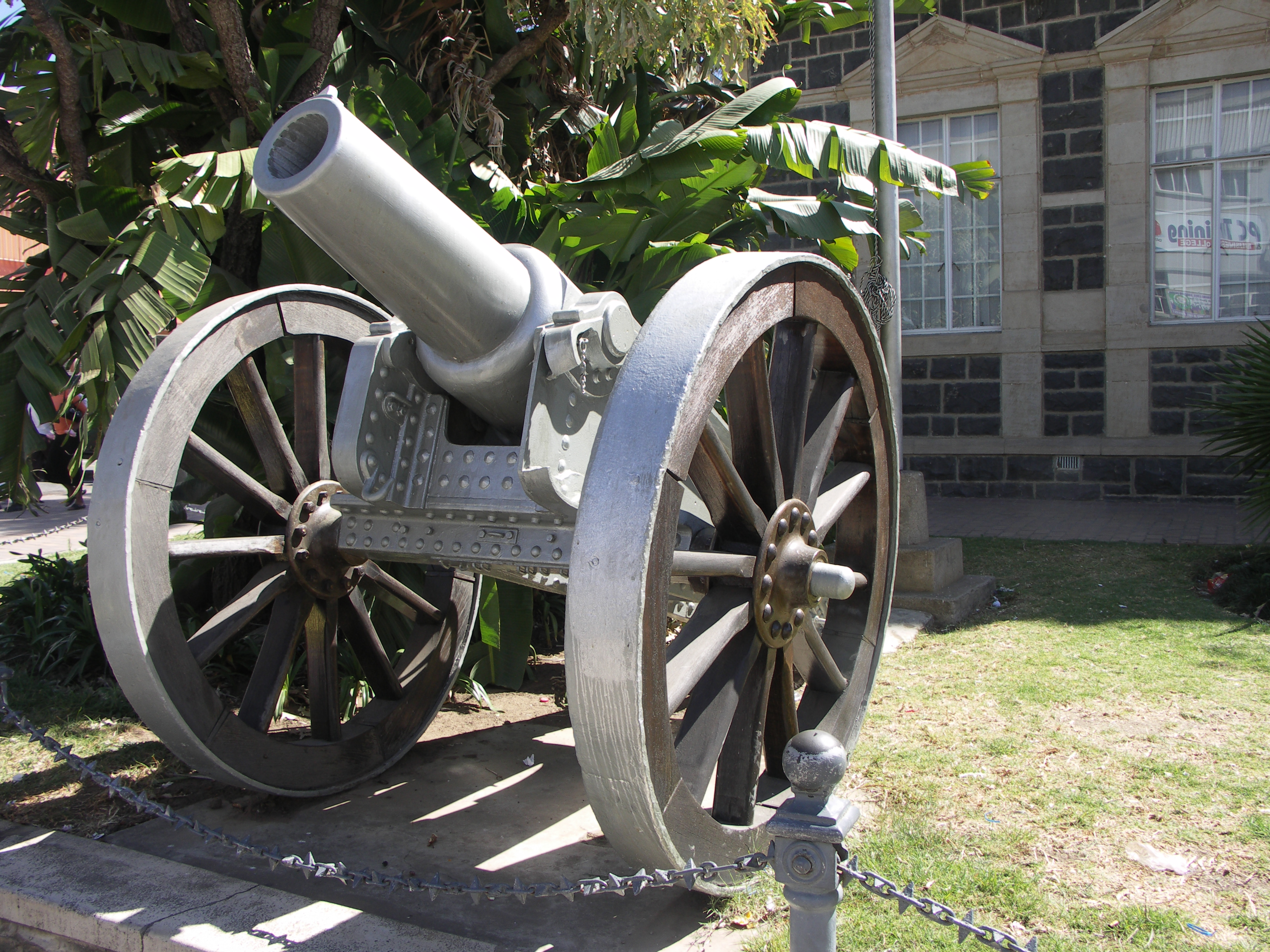
One of the two guns used during the Siege of Ladysmith

Two of these guns, called Castor and Pollux, used during the Siege of Ladysmith, stand in front of the Ladysmith town hall. They have been declared Heritage Objects by the South African Heritage Resource Agency. Both the guns and their ammunition were outdated by the time of the siege and they tended to make a lot of smoke when fired.

== See also ==
- List of howitzers
