= BL 6-inch 30 cwt howitzer =

BL 6 inch 30 cwt Howitzer
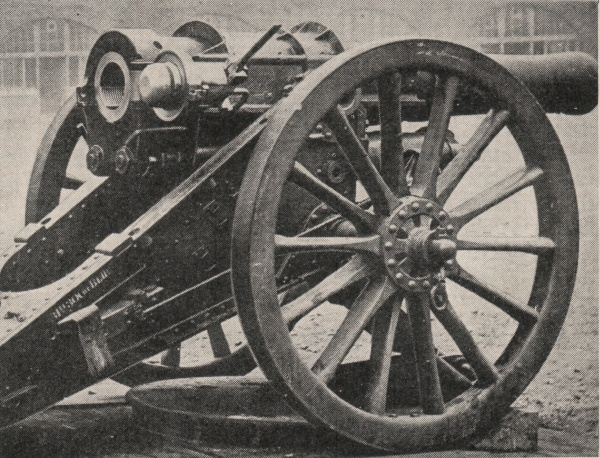
- With breech open, circa. 1900
- Type: Medium howitzer
- Place of origin: United Kingdom

Service history
- In service: 1896 - 1918
- Wars: Second Boer War; World War I Greco-Turkish War (1919–1922); German invasion of Greece

Production history
- Designed: 1896
- No. built: 120

Specifications
- Mass: 7733lb (3507kg)
- Crew: 10
- Shell weight: Lyddite : 122 lb 9 oz (55.59 kg), later 100 lb (45.36 kg); Shrapnel : 100 lb (45.36 kg)
- Calibre: 6-inch (152.4 mm)
- Recoil: Hydro spring, 18 inch
- Carriage: Wheeled, box trail
- Elevation: -10° - 35° (wheeled carriage); 35° - 70° (siege mount)
- Muzzle velocity: 777 ft/s (237 m/s)
- Maximum firing range: 5,200 yds (122lb 9oz shell, on wheeled travelling carriage); 7,000 yds (122lb 9oz shell, on siege mounting); 7,000 yards (100 lb shell, on wheeled travelling carriage)

The Ordnance BL 6 inch 30cwt howitzer was a British medium howitzer used in the Second Boer War and early in World War I. The qualifier "30cwt" refers to the weight of the barrel and breech together which weighed 30 hundredweight (cwt) : 30 × 112 lb = 3,360 lb. It can be identified by the slightly flared shape of the muzzle and large recuperator springs below the barrel.

== History ==
The BL 6-inch 30 cwt howitzer was introduced in 1896, based on an Indian Army design.

Its original shell was 122 pounds 9 ounces (55.6 kg) Lyddite explosive. In 1901 a lighter 100 lb (45 kg) shell was introduced which increased maximum range when firing from its wheeled travelling carriage to 7000 yards. These were then referred to as the "heavy" and "light" shell respectively. A 100 lb shrapnel shell was also available.

It was phased out and replaced by the 6 inch 26 cwt howitzer from late 1915 onwards. Also, in 1915 it received barrel, breechlock, recoil system and ammunition upgrades increasing its maximum range to 10400 meters (8400 meters with standard ammunition).(See specifications)

== Combat use ==
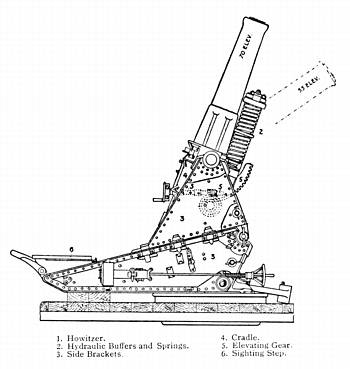
On siege mounting

This gun was designed as a siege howitzer firing a special 122 pounds 9 ounces (55.59 kg) howitzer shell. It was designed to be fired from a static siege platform, with wheels removed, for accurate long-range shooting. When fired mounted on its normal wheeled travelling carriage, which had become standard practice for modern medium artillery, its range and accuracy diminished due to limited elevation and also lack of a modern recoil mechanism.

=== Second Boer War ===
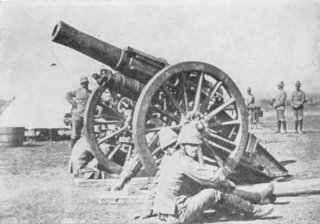
In South Africa, Second Boer War

Twelve guns were employed in South Africa in the Second Boer War as part of the British siege train. It was during this campaign that the short range limitation became evident, and shell weight was traded for greater range in 1901 with the introduction of a "light" 100 pounds (45.36 kg) shell which increased maximum range when firing from its wheeled travelling carriage to 7000 yards. No use was found for the siege platform which allowed elevation to 70°: ”This capability was designed for distinct siege operation, and in South Africa the need for this did not arise. In this theatre the platform was an encumbrance, and it was discovered that it could be dispensed with.”

=== World War I ===
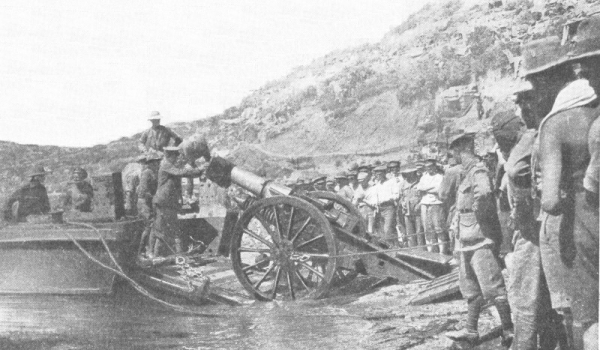
Gun landing at Anzac Cove, Gallipoli, 1915

When World War I began approximately 80 guns were still available. They constituted the only true heavy artillery the British army possessed, and were heavily engaged in the early battles in France and Flanders. It was adapted to use the standard 100 pounds (45.36 kg) gun shell, with a slight enlargement of the chamber to produce Mk I*, allowing slightly larger propellant charges. It served in all theatres, including the Western Front, until replaced by the modern 6 inch 26 cwt howitzer from late 1915. At Gallipoli, where there was a lower priority for modern ordnance, the 6 inch 30 cwt was used at Helles by 14th Siege Battery RGA (4 guns), attached to 29th Division, and at Anzac by the Australian 1st Heavy Artillery Battery (2 guns from the Royal Malta Artillery, crewed by the Royal Marine Artillery, which arrived in May).

=== In Greek Service (1917–1941) ===
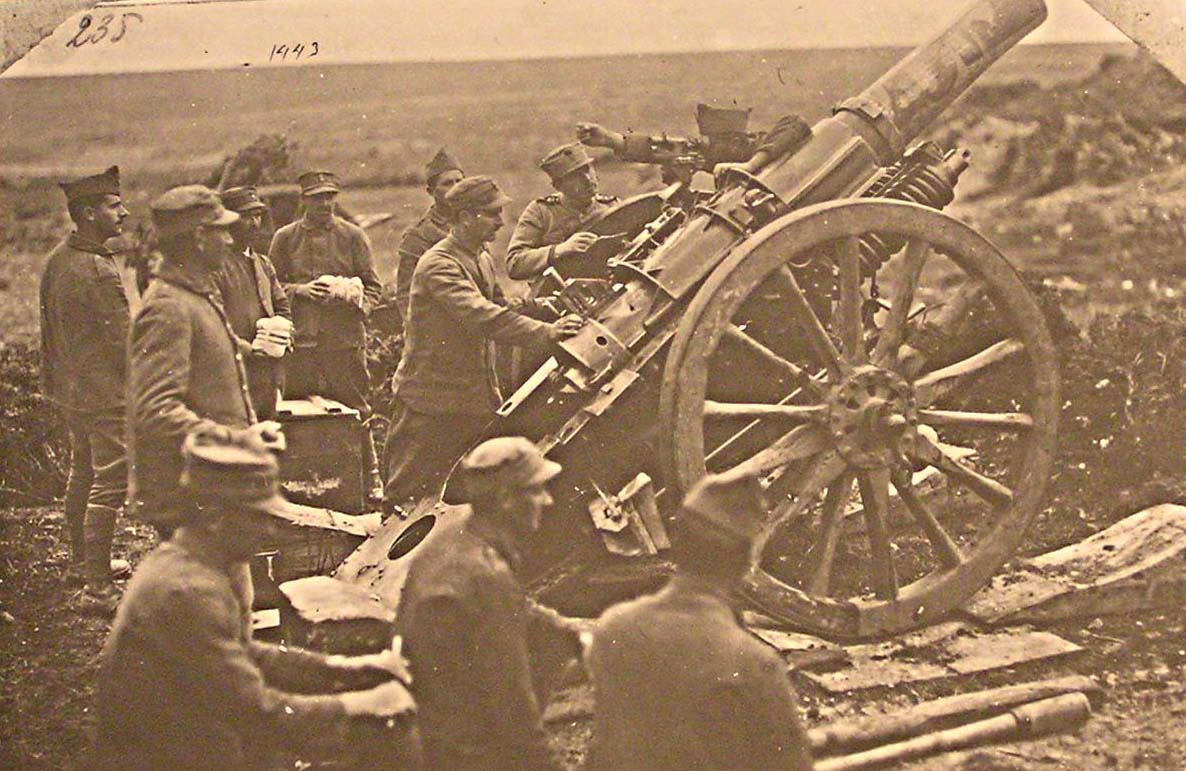
Gun in Greek service during the war against Turkey

The BL 6-inch 30 cwt howitzer entered service with the Greek Army in late 1917, when due to shortage and obsoleteness of Greek howitzers, the British Army transferred 40 pieces to the National Defence Army Corps, which was operating in the Macedonian front. These pieces made up for a full Howitzer Regiment of 36 guns, composed of 3 squadrons and 3 batteries (4 guns) each, which saw action during the closing phases of the war and the Macedonian Front breakthrough.

During the Greco-Turkish War (1919-1922), the Howitzer Regiment dispatched a 155 mm (sic) Howitzer Squadron from 1919 to early 1922, which was used as Army Reserve Artillery. After February 1922, the Howitzer Regiment was fully deployed in Asia Minor, but its 9 batteries were being mainly used to reinforce divisional artillery in the front sectors that were deemed dangerous for a Turkish breakthrough.

The BL 6-inch 30 cwt howitzer continued to serve in the Greek Artillery for another 18 years, but from 1932 it was already rendered "obsolete" and in need of "extensive repairs to return to operational status". Despite this, at least 16 pieces were deployed behind the "Metaxas Line" along the Greco-Bulgarian border in late 1939 and participated in the desperate battle against the invading German Army from 6 to 9 April 1941.

== World War I ammunition ==
2 lb 8½ oz cordite cartridge for "light" (100 lb) shell, showing arrangement of cordite rings around central core. One or more rings were removed for shorter ranges.	Mk I 100-lb "light" lyddite shell	No 17 D.A. percussion fuze for lydditte shells	Star shell	Mk IX 100 lb shrapnel shell for gun or howitzer (1 inch G.S. fuze gauge)	Mk I 100 lb "light" shrapnel shell for howitzer (2 inch fuze gauge)	Mk IV T friction tube

== Operators ==
- Australia - 2 howitzers, 1st Heavy Artillery Battery (see Ross Mallett, AIF 1914-1918 Artillery & 2. Gallipoli)
- United Kingdom - Royal Garrison Artillery
- Greece - 12 howitzers, Howitzer Battery (World War I - Macedonian front), 36 howitzers, Howitzer Regiment (Greco-Turkish War (1919-1922))

== See also ==
- 6 inch 26 cwt howitzer : British Empire successor
- List of howitzers

=== Weapons of comparable role, performance and era ===
- 15 cm schwere Feldhaubitze M 94 : Austro-Hungarian equivalent
- Rimailho Model 1904TR : French equivalent
- 152 mm howitzer M1910 : French/Russian equivalent
- 15 cm sFH 02 : German equivalent
- 6-inch howitzer M1908 : approximate US equivalent

== Surviving examples ==
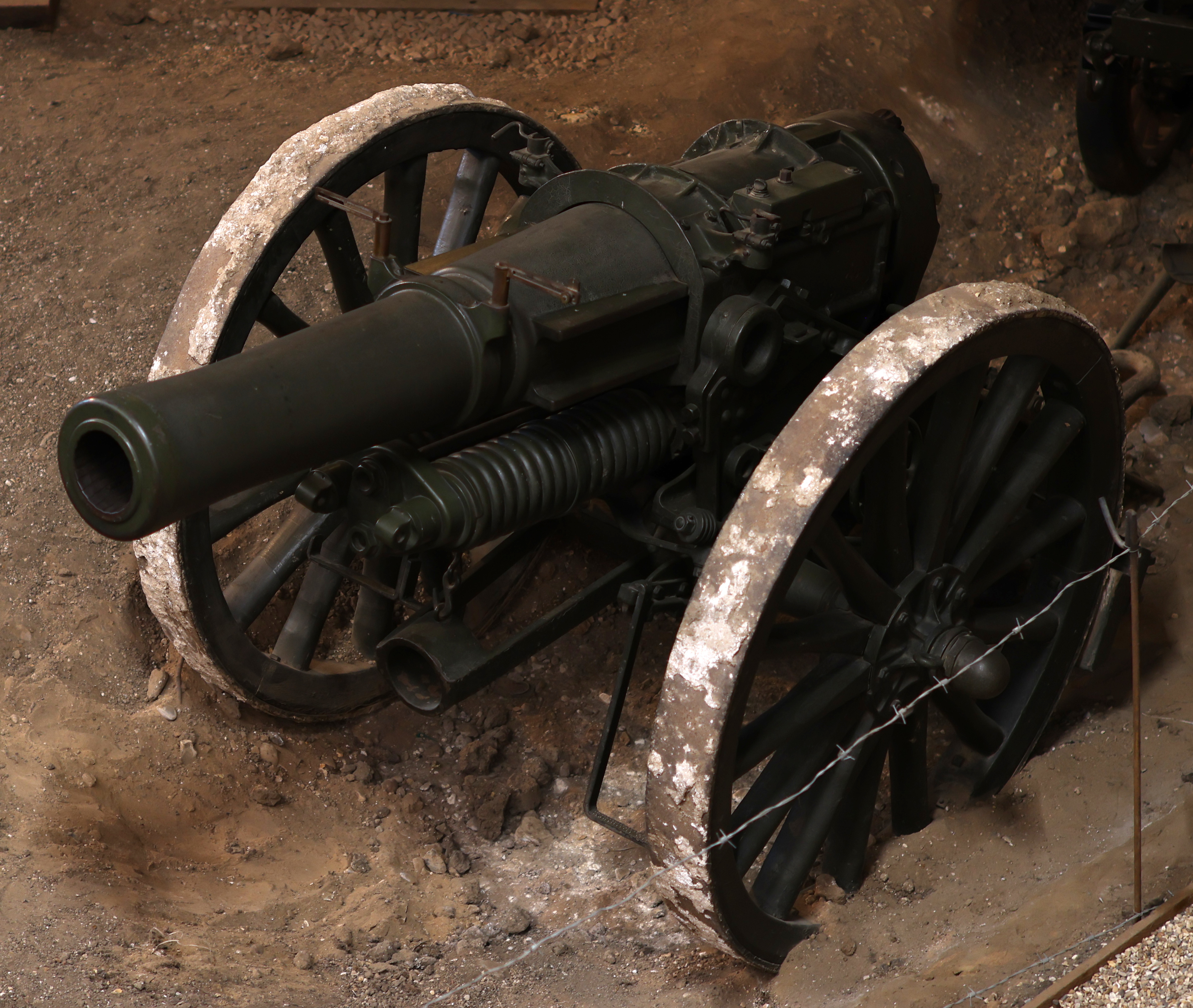
Gun at the Imperial War Museum Duxford

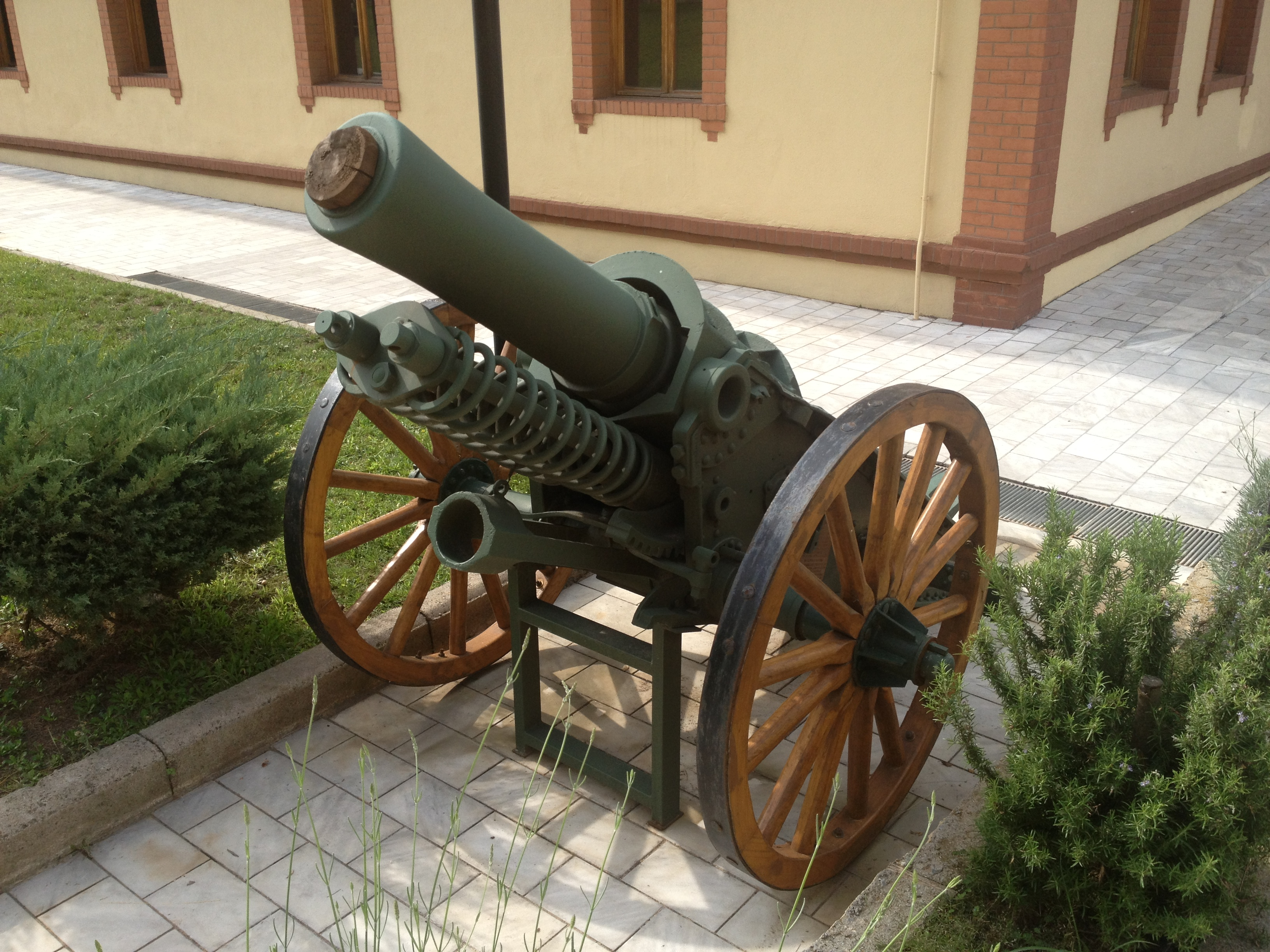
Gun at the War Museum of Thessaloniki, Greece

- A gun at Royal Artillery Museum, Woolwich, London
- A gun at the Imperial War Museum, Duxford, UK
- A gun at the War Museum of Athens, Greece
- A gun at the War Museum, Salonica, Greece
- A "gatekeeper" gun in NDC-GR HQ, Salonica, Greece.

== Bibliography ==
- Text Book of Gunnery, 1902. LONDON : PRINTED FOR HIS MAJESTY'S STATIONERY OFFICE, BY HARRISON AND SONS, ST. MARTIN'S LANE
- Dale Clarke, British Artillery 1914-1919. Heavy Artillery. Osprey Publishing, Oxford UK, 2005 ISBN 1-84176-788-3
- I.V. Hogg & L.F. Thurston, British Artillery Weapons & Ammunition 1914-1918. London: Ian Allan, 1972. ISBN 978-0-7110-0381-1
- Major Darrel Hall, "Guns in South Africa 1899-1902 Part V and VI" in The South African Military History Society Military History Journal - Vol 2 No 3, June 1972
- Hellenic Army General Staff / Army History Directorate, Volumes regarding Greek Army Operations in WWI, Asia Minor and WWII.
- Hogg, Ian. Twentieth-Century Artillery. New York: Barnes & Noble Books, 2000. ISBN 0-7607-1994-2 Pg.61
