= 1st Heavy Artillery Battery (Australia) =

Australian artillery unit

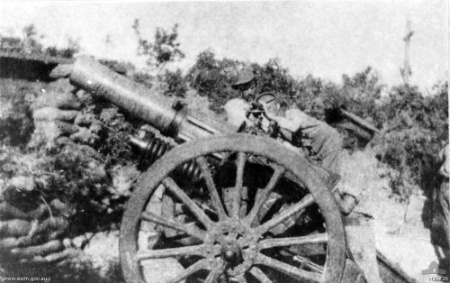
The Kangar, a 6 inch 30 cwt howitzer, about to open fire on the "Olive Grove" from "White's Valley", Gallipoli August 1915

1st Heavy Artillery Battery was an Australian artillery unit during World War I. Formed at Gallipoli on 14 July 1915 the battery formed part of the 1st Division artillery. The battery was originally equipped with 2 old 6 inch 30 cwt howitzers and one even older 4.7 inch naval gun. The battery was disbanded in Egypt during February 1916 to provide personnel for howitzer batteries.
