= BL 6-inch 26 cwt howitzer =

Medium howitzer used during World War I and World War II

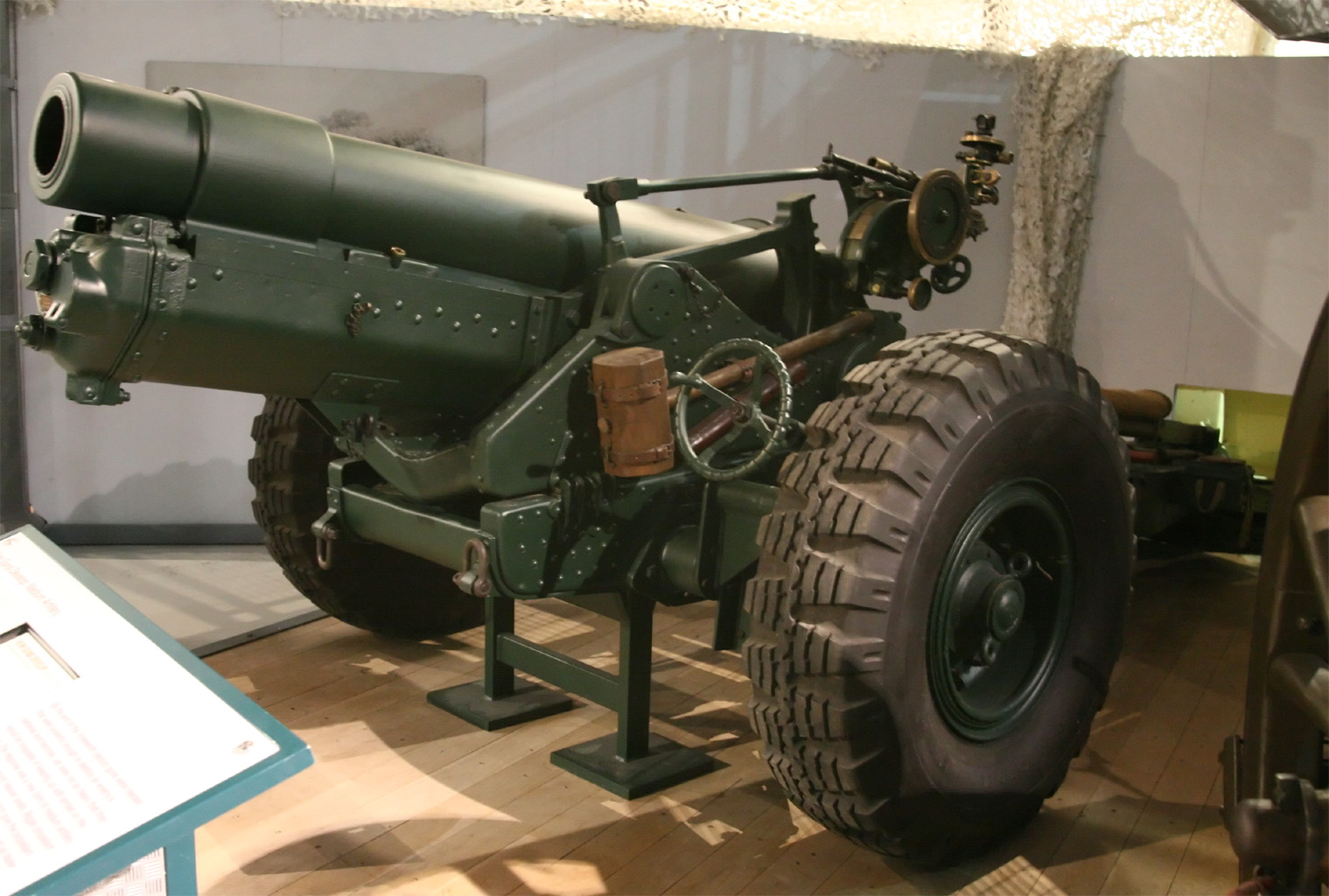
- A 6-inch 26 cwt howitzer on World War II pneumatic tyres at the Royal Artillery Museum.
- Type: Medium howitzer
- Place of origin: United Kingdom

Service history
- In service: 1916–1945
- Used by: List of operators: Australia; Belgium; Canada; Estonian Republic; Greece; Italy; Netherlands; New Zealand; Portugal; Russian Empire; South Africa; Soviet Union; United Kingdom
- Wars: World War I World War II

Production history
- Designer: Vickers
- Designed: 1915
- Manufacturer: List: Vickers; Beardmore; Coventry Ordnance; Woolwich Ordnance; Midvale Steel
- Produced: 1915–?
- No. built: 3,633

Specifications
- Mass: Total: 8,142 lb (3,693 kg); Barrel: 2,856 lb (1,295 kg)
- Length: 21 ft 7 in (6.58 m)
- Barrel length: Total: 7 ft 3 in (2.21 m); Bore: 6 ft 8 in (2.03 m) L/13.3
- Width: 6 ft 10 in (2.08 m)
- Crew: 10
- Shell: Gas; Incendiary; High explosive
- Shell weight: WWI: 100 pounds (45.4 kg); WWII: 86 pounds (39.0 kg)
- Calibre: 6 in (152.4 mm)
- Breech: Welin screw
- Recoil: Hydro-pneumatic, variable
- Carriage: Box trail
- Elevation: 0° to +45°
- Traverse: 4° L & R
- Rate of fire: Max: 2 rpm
- Muzzle velocity: Max: 1,400 ft/s (430 m/s)
- Maximum firing range: WWI 100 pounds (45.4 kg) shell : 9,500 yards (8,700 m); WWII 86 pounds (39.0 kg) shell : 11,400 yards (10,400 m)
- Sights: Calibrating (1930s) & reciprocating

The Ordnance BL 6-inch 26cwt howitzer, officially BL 6-inch 26cwt howitzer Mk I on Carriage Mk I, was a British howitzer used during World War I and World War II. The qualifier "26cwt" refers to the weight of the barrel and breech together, which weighed 26 long hundredweight (1.3 t).

== History ==
=== World War I ===
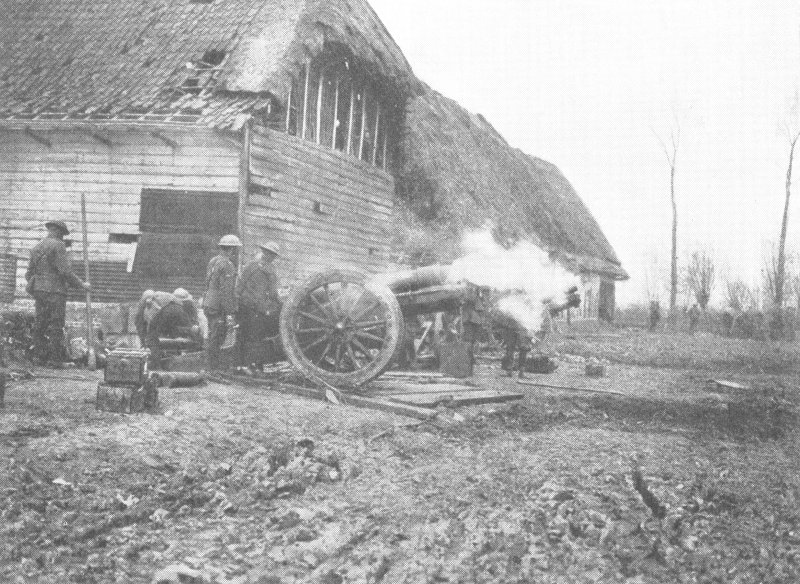
Battery firing, World War I

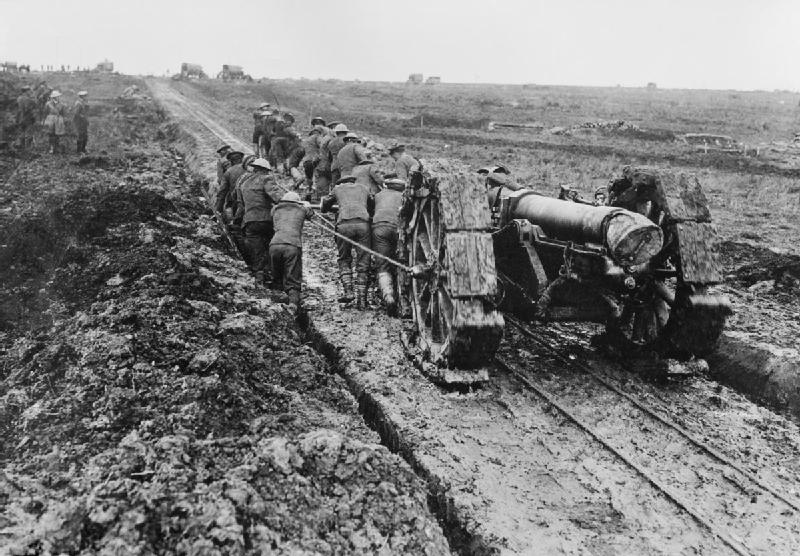
Use of girdles around wheels, Somme September 1916

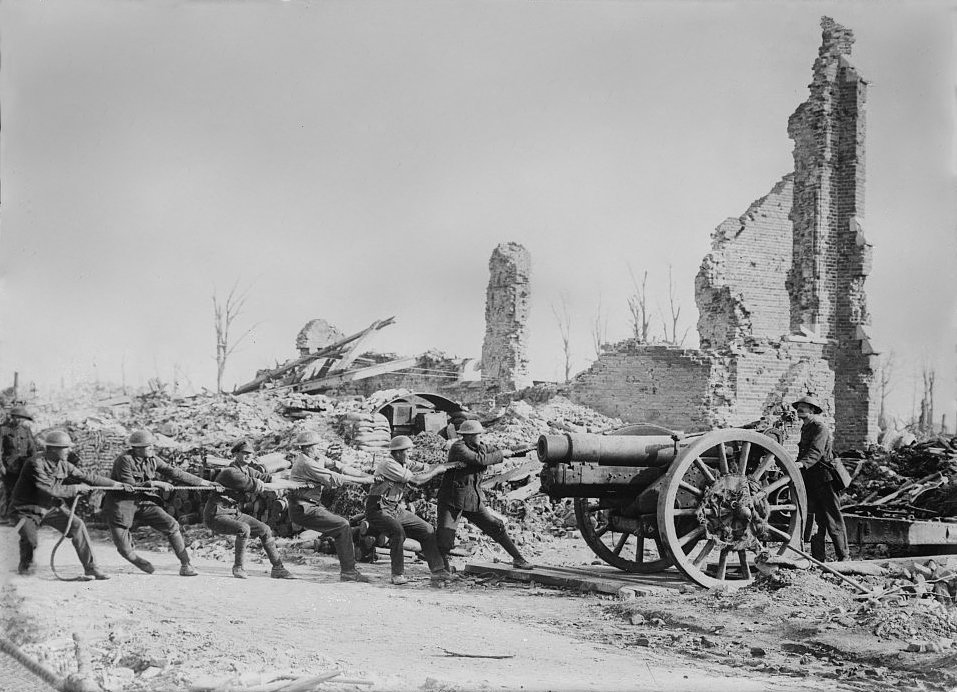
Near Boesinghe, Battle of Langemarck, August 1917

The howitzer was developed to replace the obsolescent 6 inch 25 cwt and 6-inch 30 cwt howitzers, which were outclassed by German artillery such as the 15 cm schwere Feldhaubitze 13. Design began in January 1915, the first proof-firing occurred on 30 July 1915 and it entered service in late 1915. Its combination of firepower, range and mobility (for its day) made it one of the British Empire's most important weapons in World War I.

It was originally towed by horses but from 1916 onwards was commonly towed by the FWD 4 wheel drive 3-ton lorry as heavy field artillery. The wooden spoked wheels could be fitted with "girdles" (dreadnaught wheels) for work in mud or sand to prevent them sinking. Towards the end of the war, solid rubber tyres were fitted over the iron tyres on the wheel rims, giving the rims a heavier appearance. The howitzers fired 22.4 million rounds on the Western Front.

=== Interwar years ===
During the interwar period, the wooden spoked wheels of the Carriage Mk I were augmented with rubber tyres, these modified carriages were designated Carriage Mk IR. Later on, the carriages received modern steel wheels and pneumatic tyres, designated Carriage Mk IP.

=== World War II ===
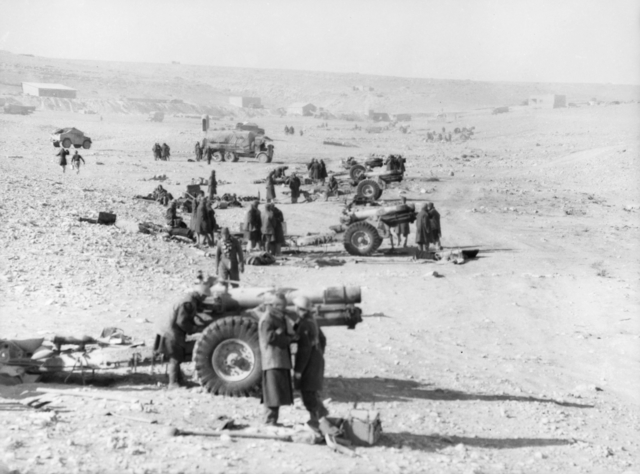
British battery in action at Tobruk, 23 January 1941

During World War II, its use was restricted after 1942 when the replacement BL 5.5-inch Medium Gun came into use but it was reintroduced in Burma due to a number of premature detonations in the 5.5-inch (140 mm) guns. After 1942, it remained in use in the Far East (mainly Burma) until the end of the war in 1945, when it was declared obsolete.

During the German conquest across Europe, German troops captured many howitzers from multiple countries. These captured examples received the designation 15.2 cm s.FH. 407(h) (Dutch howitzers), 15.2 cm s.FH. 410(b) (Belgian howitzers), 15.2 cm s.FH. 412(e) (British howitzers), 15.2 cm s.FH. 412(f) (French howitzers), (Note: Mistakenly attributed to the French Army.) 15.2 cm s.FH. 412(i) (Italian howitzers), 15.2 cm s.FH. 444(r) (Soviet howitzers).

== Variants ==
Gun variants:

- Mark I – Only variant produced

Carriage variants:

- Mark I – Wooden wheels
- Mark IR – Wooden wheels, rubber tyres
- Mark IP – Steel wheels, pneumatic tyres

== Surviving examples ==
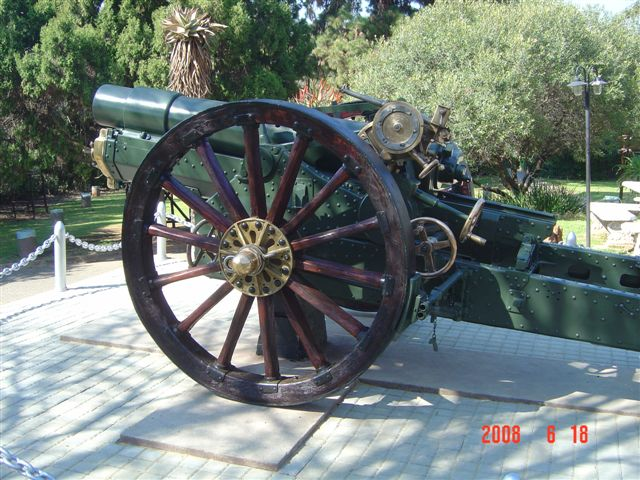
Restored gun, the Memorial to 71st (Transvaal) Siege Battery at Johannesburg Zoo.

- Royal Artillery Museum, Woolwich, London
- Army Memorial Museum, Waiouru, New Zealand
- Royal Australian Artillery Museum, North Head, Sydney, Australia
- Museo della guerra (War Museum), Rovereto (Italy)
- South Africa : The Imperial Government presented 6 howitzers to the Union of South Africa after World War I and the six South African Heavy Artillery Memorials were designed, commissioned and paid for by the South African Heavy Artillery Association to honour their fallen Comrades-in-Arms : Memorial to 71st (Transvaal) Siege Battery at Johannesburg Zoo (restored); 72nd (Griqualand West) Siege Battery at Clyde N Terry Museum, Kimberley; 73rd (Cape) Siege Battery at Company Gardens, Cape Town; 74th (Eastern Province) Siege Battery at National Museum, Bloemfontein (Restoration is about to begin, May 2009); 75th (Natal) Siege Battery, Warriors' Gate MOTH Shellhole, Old Fort Road, Durban; 125th (Transvaal) Siege Battery near the Union Buildings, Pretoria.

These guns are being restored by the Gunner's Association of South Africa

- National Museum of Military History, Saxonwold, Johannesburg, South Africa
- The Central Museum of The Royal Regiment of Canadian Artillery, Shilo Manitoba
- Barrack Green Armouries, Belonging to and restored by 3rd Field Regt.(The Loyal Company), Saint John, New Brunswick

== Ammunition ==
=== British ===
==== World War I ====
Projectiles used in World War I weighed 100 pounds (45.4 kg). A lighter 86 pounds (39.0 kg) long-range projectile was introduced in November 1918, too late to see service in the war

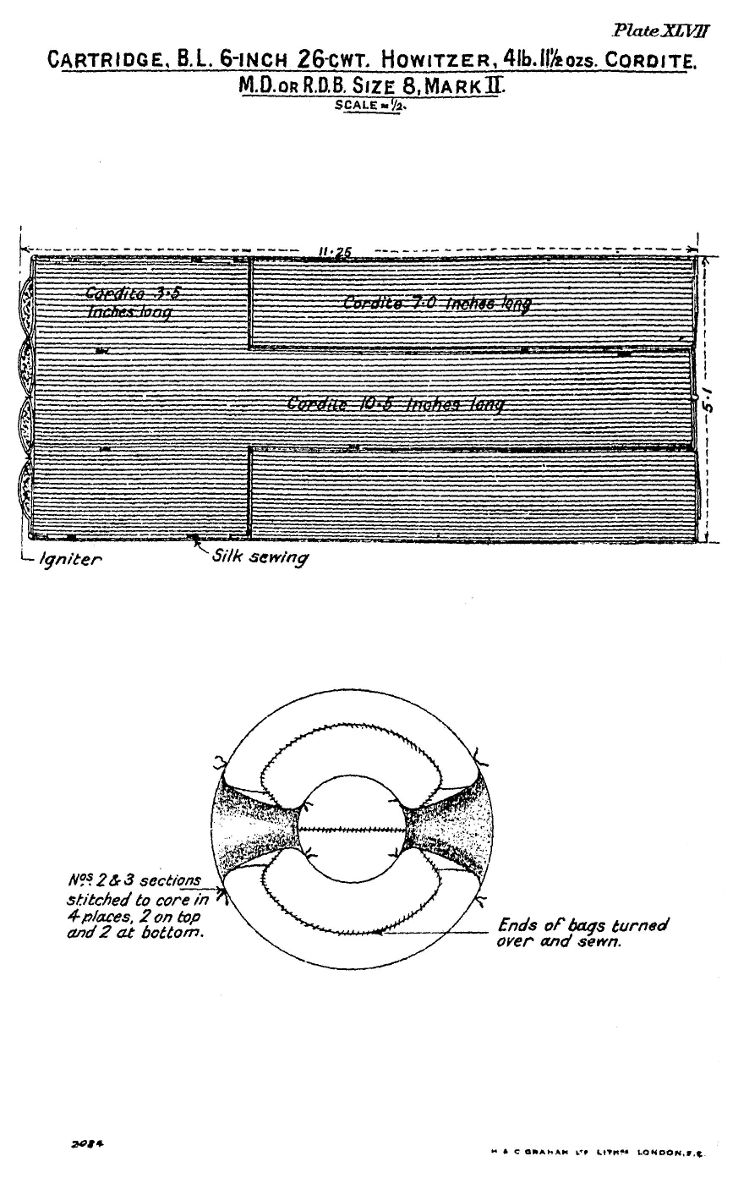
4 lb 11 1/2 oz (2.14 kg) cordite cartridge

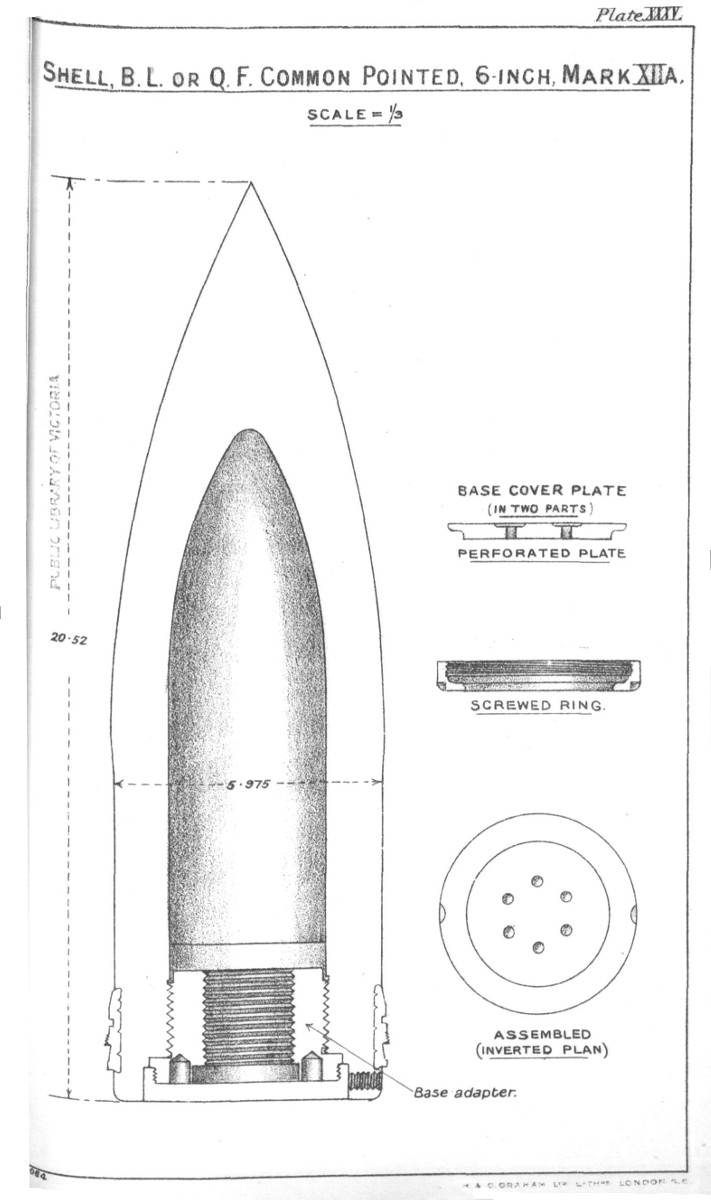
Common pointed 100lb shell Mark XIIA

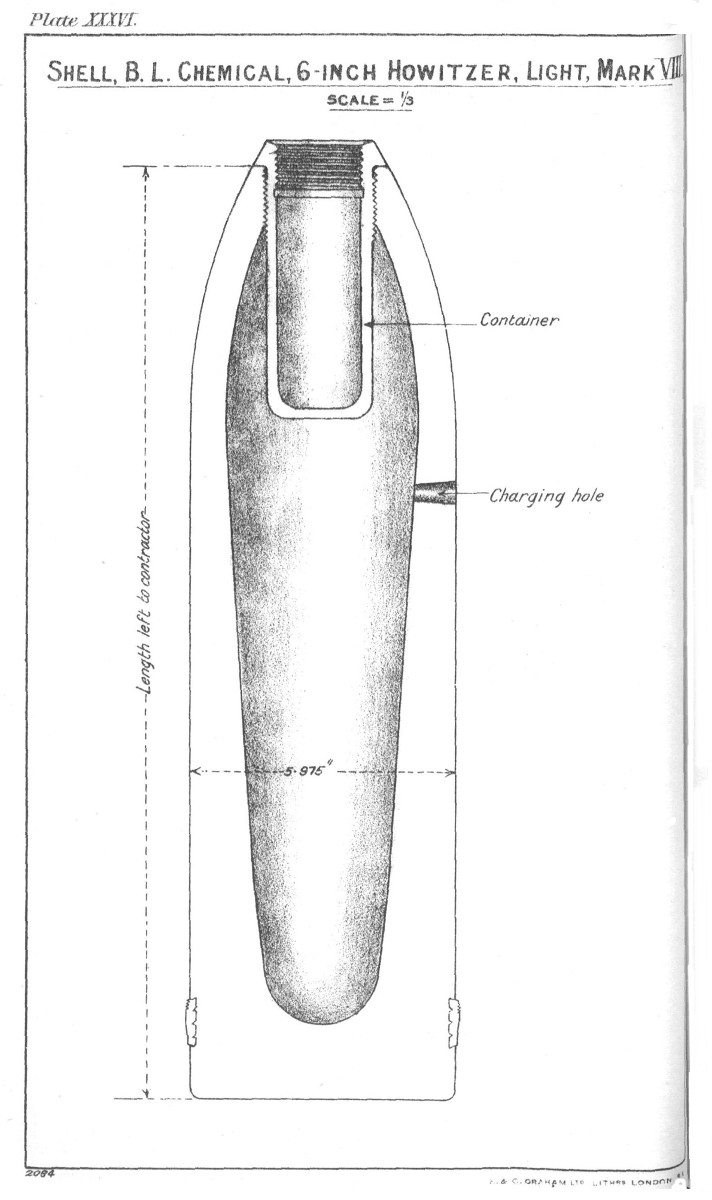
100lb chemical shell Mark VIII

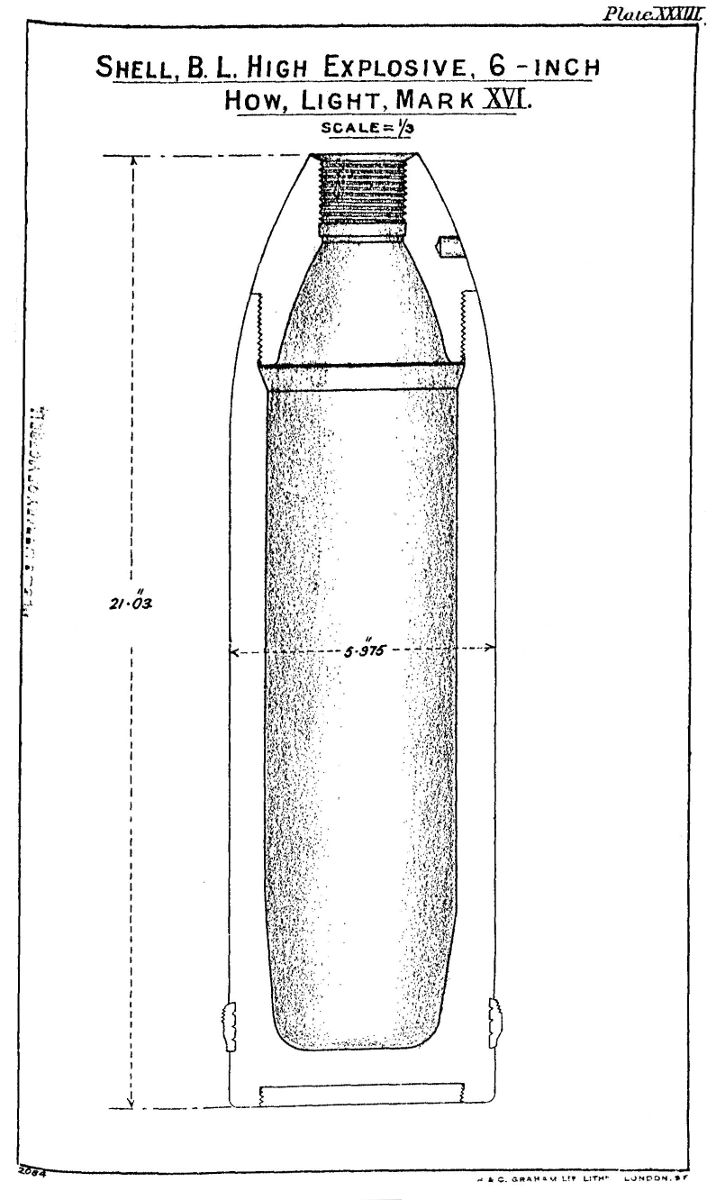
High explosive 100lb shell Mark XVI

== See also ==
- BL 6 inch 30 cwt howitzer : British predecessor
- List of howitzers

=== Weapons of comparable role, performance and era ===
- Canon de 155 C modèle 1917 Schneider French equivalent
- 15 cm sFH 13 German equivalent
- 152 mm howitzer M1910 Russian equivalent

== Bibliography ==
- Dale Clarke, British Artillery 1914-1919. Heavy Artillery. Osprey Publishing, Oxford UK, 2005 ISBN 978-1-84176-788-8
- General Sir Martin Farndale, History of the Royal Regiment of Artillery. Western Front 1914-18. London: Royal Artillery Institution, 1986. ISBN 978-1-870114-00-4
- I.V. Hogg & L.F. Thurston, British Artillery Weapons & Ammunition 1914-1918. London: Ian Allan, 1972. ISBN 978-0-7110-0381-1
