= 15 cm sFH 02 =

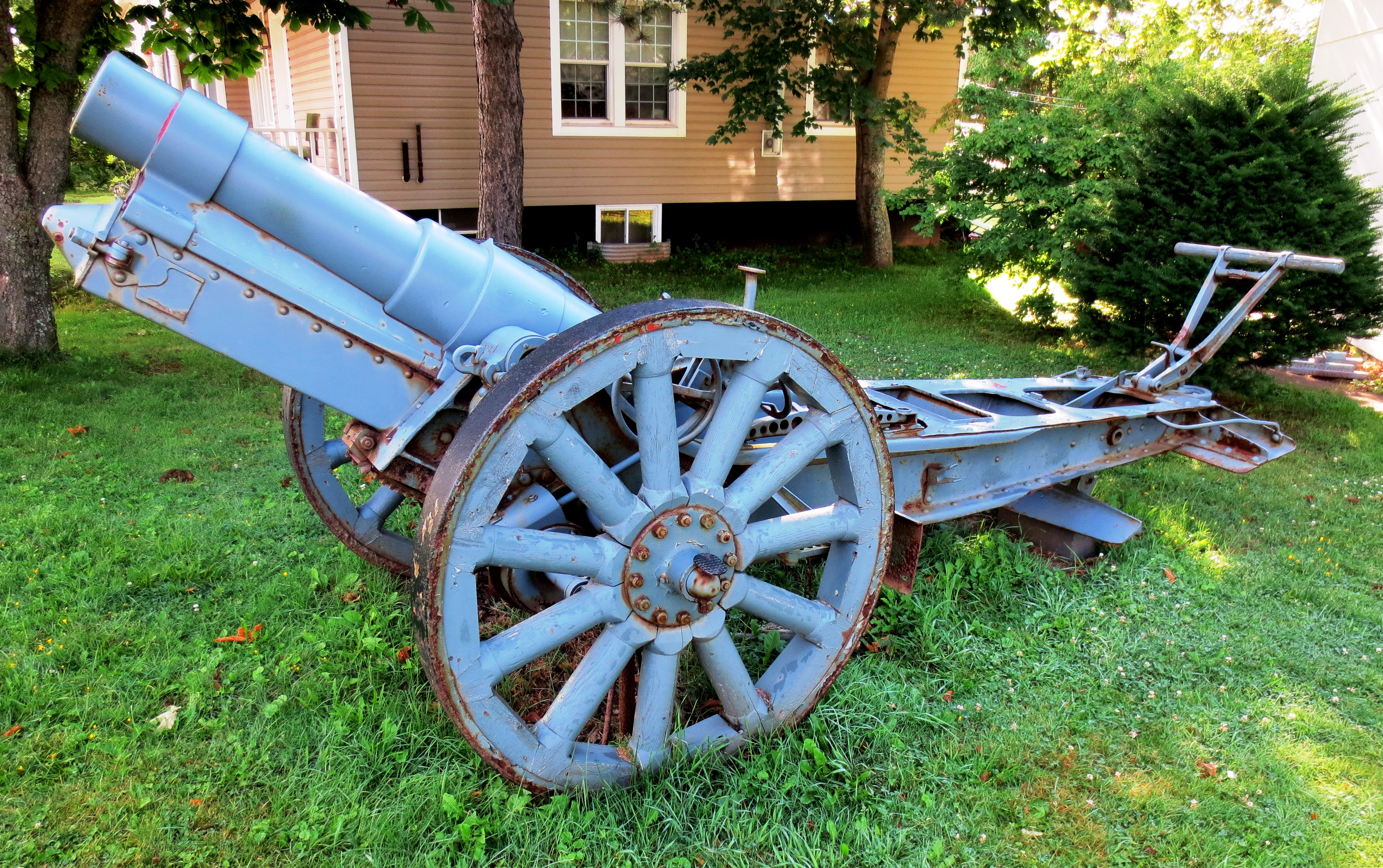
- Type: Heavy field howitzer
- Place of origin: German Empire

Service history
- In service: 1903–1918
- Used by: German Empire
- Wars: World War I

Production history
- Designer: Krupp
- Designed: 1902
- Manufacturer: Krupp

Specifications
- Mass: 2,035 kg (4,486 lb)
- Barrel length: 1.8 m (5 ft 11 in)
- Height: 1.23 m (4 ft)
- Shell: 40.5 kg (89 lb)
- Caliber: 149.1 mm (5.87 in)
- Recoil: hydro-spring
- Elevation: 0° to +45°
- Traverse: 4°
- Muzzle velocity: 325 m/s (1,070 ft/s)
- Maximum firing range: 7,450 m (8,150 yd)

The 15 cm schwere Feldhaubitze 1902 (English: "15 cm heavy field howitzer 1902") was a German heavy field howitzer introduced in 1903 and served in World War I.

== Design and history ==
It was the first artillery piece to use a modern recoil system in the German Army. Some 416 were in service at the beginning of the World War I. Its mobility, which allowed it to be deployed as medium artillery, and fairly heavy shell gave the German army a firepower advantage in the early battles in Belgium and France in 1914 as the French and British armies lacked an equivalent. France had a Canon de 65 M with a recoil system, but used it only as a mountain howitzer.

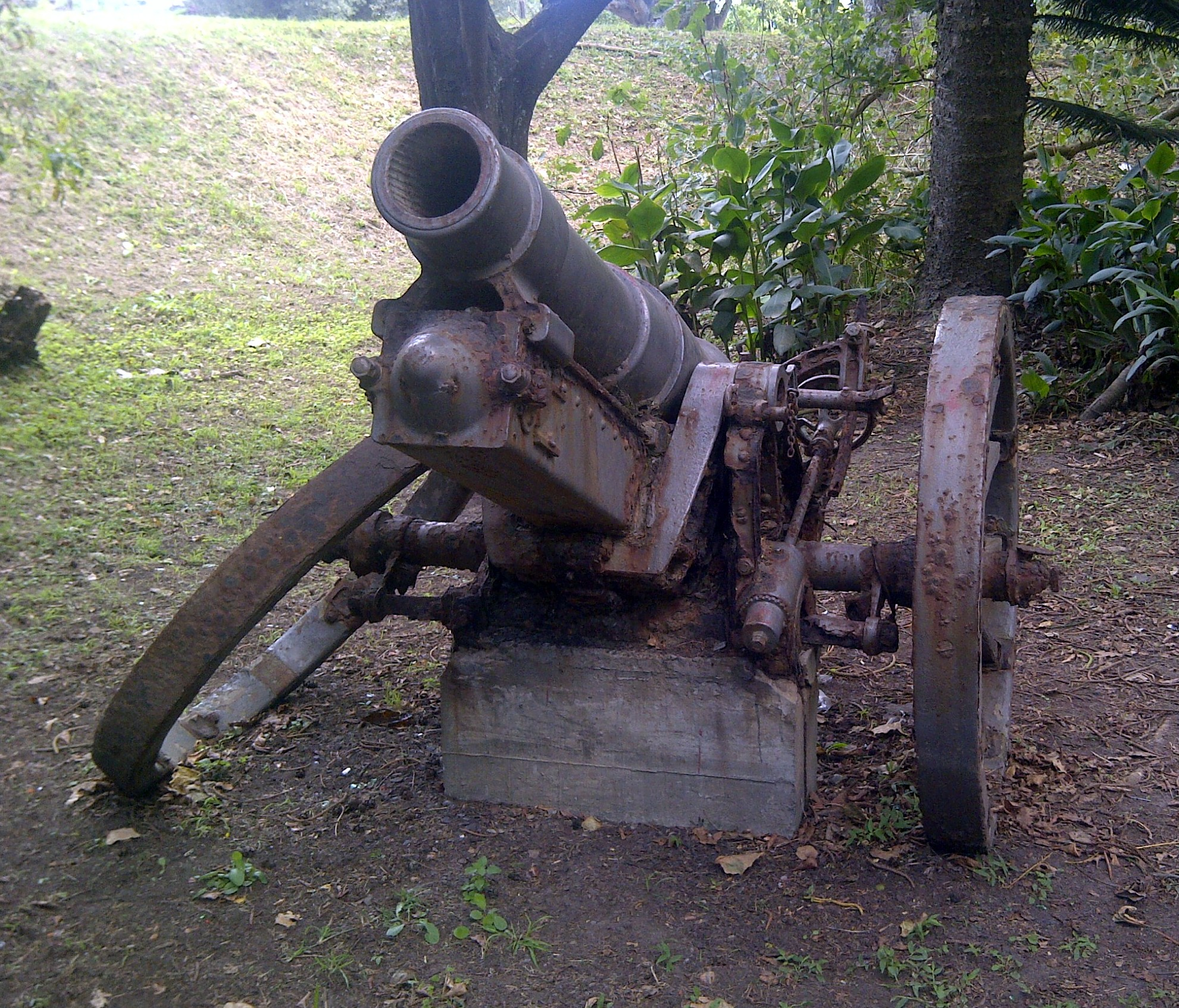
The remains of a German sFH 02 howitzer located in Kei Mouth, South Africa. It was captured from German forces in South West Africa during World War I. Like other such German weapons of the time, it was cast with the markings R II Ultima Ratio Regum ("last argument of kings").

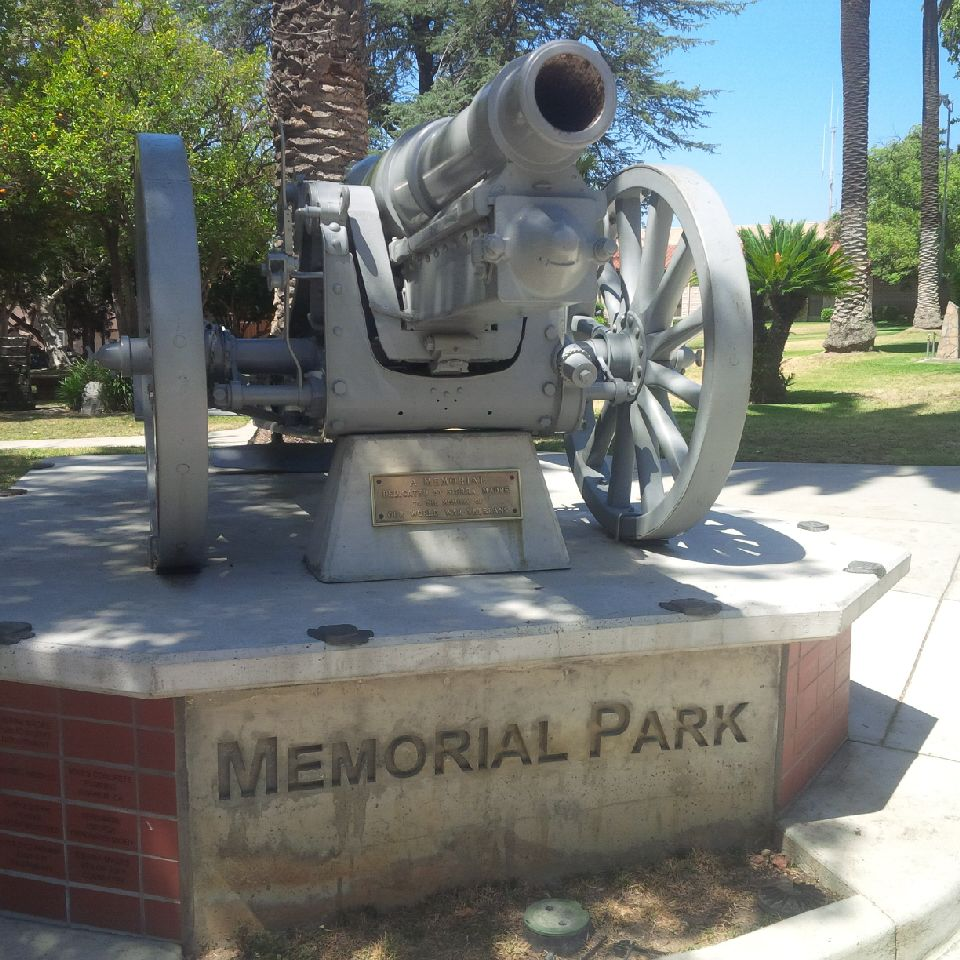
Another sFH 02 howitzer, this one confiscated by the US after World War I and now located in Sierra Madre Memorial Park.

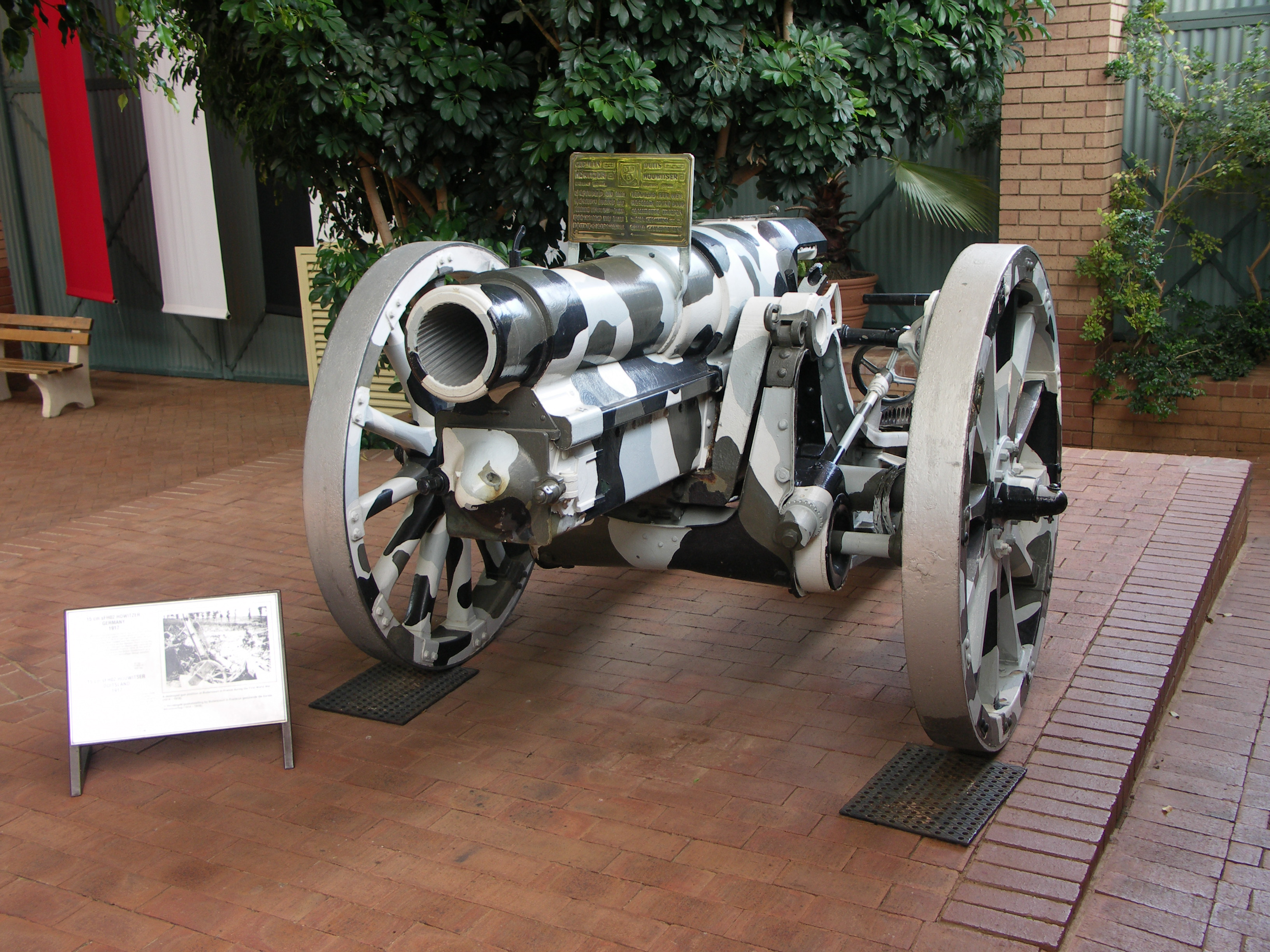
A German 15 cm sFH 02 howitzer from 1917

== See also ==
- 15 cm sFH 13 : German successor

=== Weapons of comparable role, performance and era ===
- 15 cm schwere Feldhaubitze M 94: Austro-Hungarian equivalent
- BL 6 inch 30 cwt howitzer: British equivalent
- Rimailho Model 1904TR : French equivalent
- 152 mm howitzer M1910 : French/Russian equivalent
- 6 inch field howitzer M-1908 : approximate US equivalent
