= M1908 6-inch howitzer =

World War I howitzer

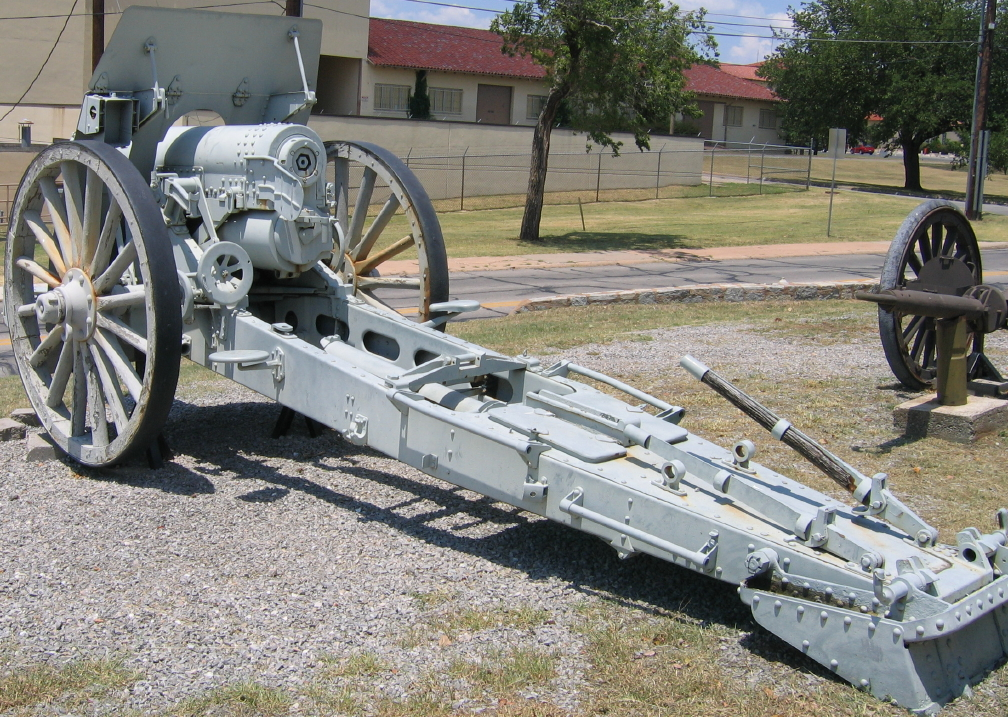
- M1908 at the U.S. Army Field Artillery Museum
- Type: Heavy howitzer
- Place of origin: United States

Service history
- In service: 1910–1920
- Used by: United States
- Wars: World War I

Production history
- Designer: Bethlehem Steel
- Designed: 1906–1909
- Manufacturer: Gun: Watervliet Arsenal; Carriage: Rock Island Arsenal, Bethlehem Steel
- Produced: 1910–1916
- No. built: 40

Specifications
- Mass: 7,354 lb (3,336 kg)
- Barrel length: 81.5 in (207 cm) bore (13.6 calibers)
- Crew: 9
- Shell: Separate loading cased charge
- Shell weight: 120 lb (54 kg) common or shrapnel
- Calibre: 6 in (152.4 mm)
- Breech: Interrupted screw
- Recoil: Hydro-spring
- Elevation: -5° to 40°
- Traverse: 6°
- Muzzle velocity: 900 ft/s (270 m/s)
- Maximum firing range: 6,700 yards (6,125 m) (40° max elevation)

The M1908 6-inch howitzer, officially the 6-inch Howitzer, Model of 1908, was the principal heavy howitzer piece of the U.S. Army prior to World War I.

== History ==
Forty of these weapons had been produced before 1917, and all were employed within the United States for training purposes during the war. Although this weapon appears in World War I-era tables of organization and equipment, for combat use in France the Canon de 155 C mle 1917 Schneider was purchased, and variants of this remained the standard weapon of this class until early World War II. All surviving weapons were retired during the 1920s.

It is unusual among American-designed field artillery weapons in that it has the recoil cylinder situated above the barrel. The 4.7-inch howitzer M1908/M1912 shared this feature. The 75 mm gun M1917 also had this, but was based on the British QF 18-pounder gun.

Ammunition was either common steel shell with a base fuze, or shrapnel with a combination time/percussion fuze.

== See also ==
- 15 cm schwere Feldhaubitze M 94 : approximate Austro-Hungarian equivalent
- BL 6-inch 30 cwt howitzer : approximate British equivalent
- Rimailho Model 1904TR : approximate French equivalent
- 152 mm howitzer M1910 : approximate French/Russian equivalent
- 15 cm sFH 02 : approximate German equivalent
