= 15 cm sFH 13 =

15 cm s.FH. 13
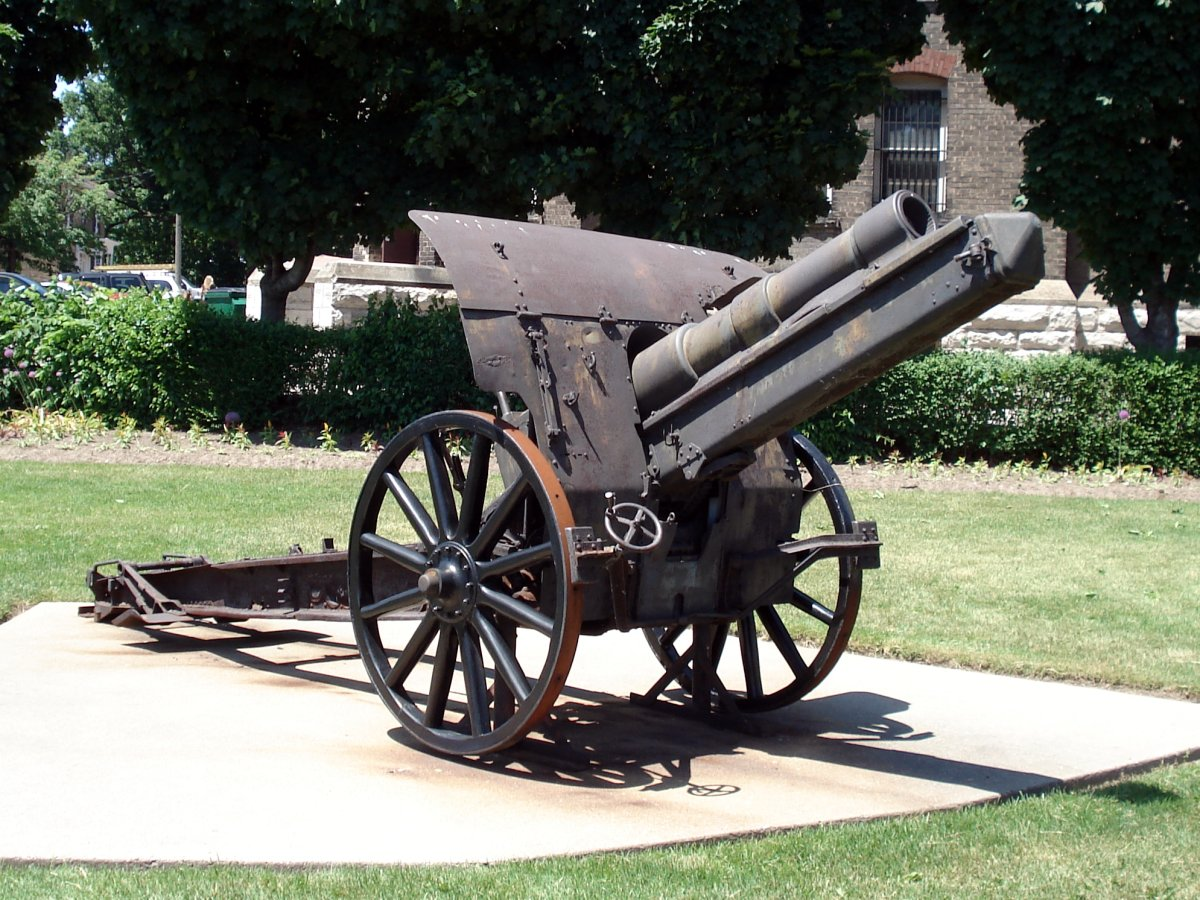
- Type: Heavy field howitzer
- Place of origin: German Empire

Service history
- In service: 1913–1945
- Used by: List of operators: German Empire; Ottoman Empire; Belgium; Netherlands; Latvia; Nazi Germany; Romania
- Wars: World War I; World War II

Production history
- Designer: Krupp
- Designed: 1913
- Manufacturer: Krupp; Rheinmetall; Spandau
- Produced: 1913–1918
- No. built: 3,409
- Variants: kurz s.FH. 13; lg. s.FH. 13; lg. s.FH. 13/02

Specifications
- Mass: 2,250 kg (4,960 lbs)
- Length: 2.54 m (8 ft 4 in)
- Barrel length: 2.096 m (6 ft 11 in) L/17
- Shell: 149.1 x 112. 5 mmR separate-loading, cased charge (7 charges)
- Shell weight: 42 kilograms (93 lb) (HE)
- Caliber: 149.1 mm (5.89 in)
- Breech: horizontal sliding-block
- Recoil: hydro-spring variable recoil
- Carriage: box trail
- Elevation: −4° to +45°
- Traverse: 5°
- Rate of fire: 3 rpm
- Muzzle velocity: 377 m/s (1,240 ft/s)
- Effective firing range: 8,900 m (9,700 yd)

The 15 cm schwere Feldhaubitze 13 (15 cm sFH 13), was a heavy field howitzer used by Germany in World War I and the beginning of World War II.

== History ==
The gun was a development of the previous standard howitzer, the 15 cm sFH 02. Improvements included a longer barrel resulting in better range and a gun shield to protect the crew. Variants were: the original "kurz" (L/14 – 14 calibre short barrel version), the lg. sFH13 with a longer barrel; with minor modifications to simplify wartime manufacture of the lg. sFH weapons. Initially there were serious issues of weak recoil spring mechanisms that would break, and gun barrel explosions. The problems were solved with the upgrades. A sub variant of the sFH 13 was the lg. 15 cm sFH 13/02 which combined the long barrel with the carriage of the earlier sFH 02 when those guns became obsolete. The sFH 13/02 gun shield wasn't hinged at the top and it only used a hydro-spring recoil system. Approximately 1,000 conversions were completed and their performance was the same with only a 40 kg difference in weight.

The British referred to these guns and their shells as "five point nines" or "five-nines" as the internal diameter of the barrel was 5.9 inches (150 mm). The ability of these guns to deliver mobile heavy firepower close to the frontline gave the Germans a major firepower advantage on the Western Front early in World War I, as the French and British lacked an equivalent. It was not until late 1915 that the British began to deploy their own 6 inch 26 cwt howitzer.

About 3,500 of these guns were produced from 1913 to 1918. They continued to serve in the Reichswehr and then the Wehrmacht in the interwar period as the standard heavy howitzer until the introduction of 15 cm sFH 18 in the 1930s. They were then shifted to reserve and training units, as well as to coastal artillery. Guns turned over to Belgium and the Netherlands as reparations after World War I were taken into Wehrmacht service after the conquest of the Low Countries as the 15 cm sFH 409(b) and 15 cm sFH 406(h) respectively.

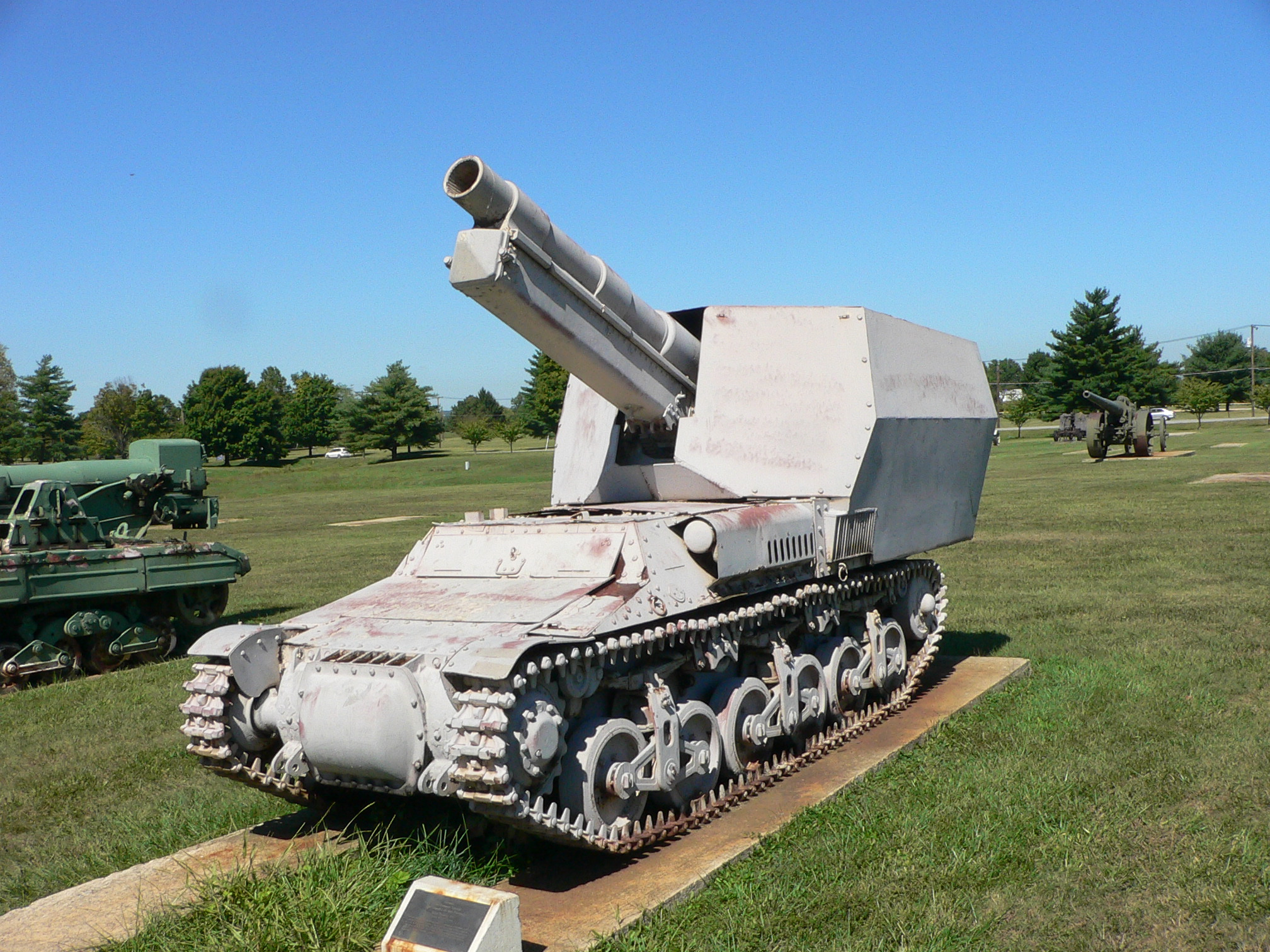
15cm sFH13/1 (Sf) auf Geschützwagen Lorraine Schlepper (f).

Romania captured 12 pieces from the German Army during World War I, putting them into service during the interwar years and in reserve during World War II

=== Self-Propelled Howitzer ===
In the course of World War II about 94 of these howitzers were mounted on Lorraine 37L tractors to create self-propelled guns, designated 15 cm sFH13/1 (Sf) auf Geschützwagen Lorraine Schlepper (f).

== See also ==
- 15 cm sFH 02 : German predecessor

=== Weapons of comparable role, performance and era ===
- 6 inch 26 cwt howitzer - British equivalent
- Canon de 155 C modèle 1917 Schneider - French equivalent
- Obice da 149/12 - Italian version of the sFH13 produced under license

== In literature ==
- Siegfried Sassoon expressed the British respect for the "five-nine" in his World War I poem Counter-Attack
- Timothy Findley mentions "5.9s" in his book The Wars
- Wilfred Owen mentions being shelled by "Five-Nines" in his poem Dulce et Decorum est
- Robert Graves, in Good-Bye to All That, says "five-nines [were] called 'Jack Johnsons' because of their black smoke" in reference to "the boxer Jack (John Arthur) Johnson (1878–1946), the first black American world heavyweight champion (1908–1915)."

== Sources ==
- Engelmann, Joachim and Scheibert, Horst. Deutsche Artillerie 1934–1945: Eine Dokumentation in Text, Skizzen und Bildern: Ausrüstung, Gliederung, Ausbildung, Führung, Einsatz. Limburg/Lahn, Germany: C. A. Starke, 1974
- Gander, Terry and Chamberlain, Peter. Weapons of the Third Reich: An Encyclopedic Survey of All Small Arms, Artillery and Special Weapons of the German Land Forces 1939-1945. New York: Doubleday, 1979 ISBN 0-385-15090-3
- Hogg, Ian V. German Artillery of World War Two. 2nd corrected edition. Mechanicsville, PA: Stackpole Books, 1997 ISBN 1-85367-480-X
