= 15 cm Mörser M 80 =

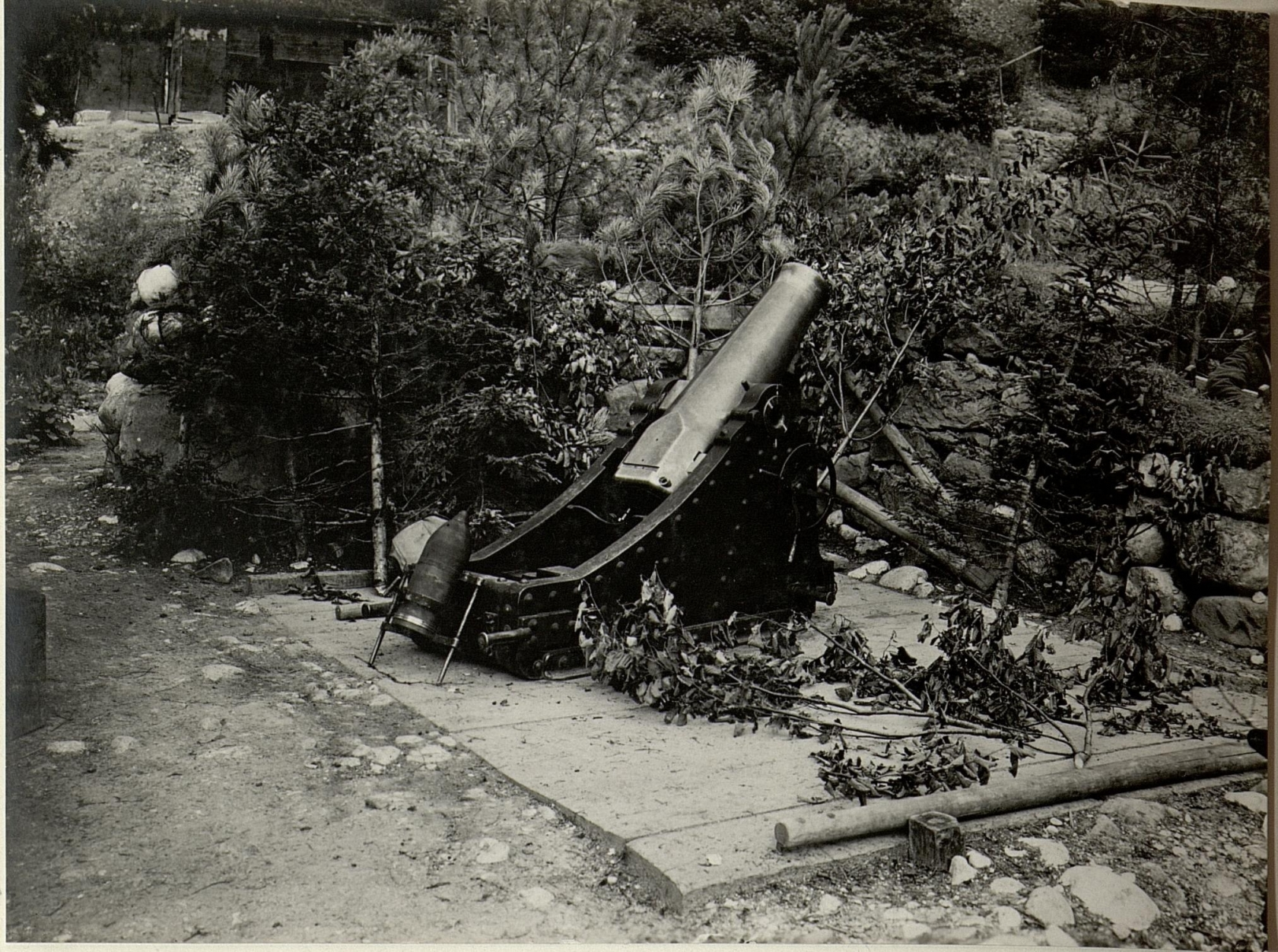
- 15 cm Mörser M 80 in 1916
- Type: Heavy howitzer
- Place of origin: Austria-Hungary

Service history
- In service: 1885–1918
- Used by: Austria-Hungary
- Wars: World War I

Production history
- Designer: General Franz von Uchatius
- Designed: 1882–1885

Specifications
- Mass: 1190kg (wheeled carriage), 2000kg (siege carriage)
- Barrel length: 1.2 metres (47 in) L/8
- Shell: separate-loading, bagged charge
- Caliber: 149 millimetres (5.9 in)
- Breech: horizontal flat wedge
- Carriage: Box trail
- Elevation: -15° to +65° (wheeled carriage), -5° to +45° (siege carriage)
- Traverse: 0
- Muzzle velocity: 205 m/sec
- Maximum firing range: 3,500 metres (3,800 yd)

The 15 cm Mörser M 80 was a heavy howitzer used by Austria-Hungary in World War I. While mostly obsolete by the time the war broke out, it did prove useful on the Italian Front where its high angle fire came in useful.

The so-called steel-bronze (92% copper bronze strengthened by autofrettage, see Franz von Uchatius) was considered inferior to steel as early as 1870s, but due to the lack of steel industry in Austria it was used for the barrel. The mortar was intended for siege work, although it had carriages suitable for both field and siege duties. The siege carriage was a steel sledge-type and was equipped with a hydraulic braking device to help absorb the recoil forces. Two wheels could be attached to the front of the carriage and a limber attached to the rear for transport. The field carriage relied on chock blocks and a rope brake device to absorb the gun's recoil.

The howitzer could only be loaded at low elevations.

The M.80 had progressive twist rifling but due to having a differently designed breech it could not share shells with the similar 15 cm Mörser M 78. Propellant charges consisted of 375 gram, 120 gram, and 30 gram bags.

== Bibliography ==
- Ortner, M. Christian. The Austro-Hungarian Artillery From 1867 to 1918: Technology, Organization, and Tactics. Vienna, Verlag Militaria, 2007 ISBN 978-3-902526-13-7
- Łukasz Chrzanowski "Artyleria Austro-Węgierska 1860-1890" Przemyśl, Wydawnictwo FORT, 2008, ISBN 978-83-923657-7-8
