= 15 cm schwere Feldhaubitze M 94 =

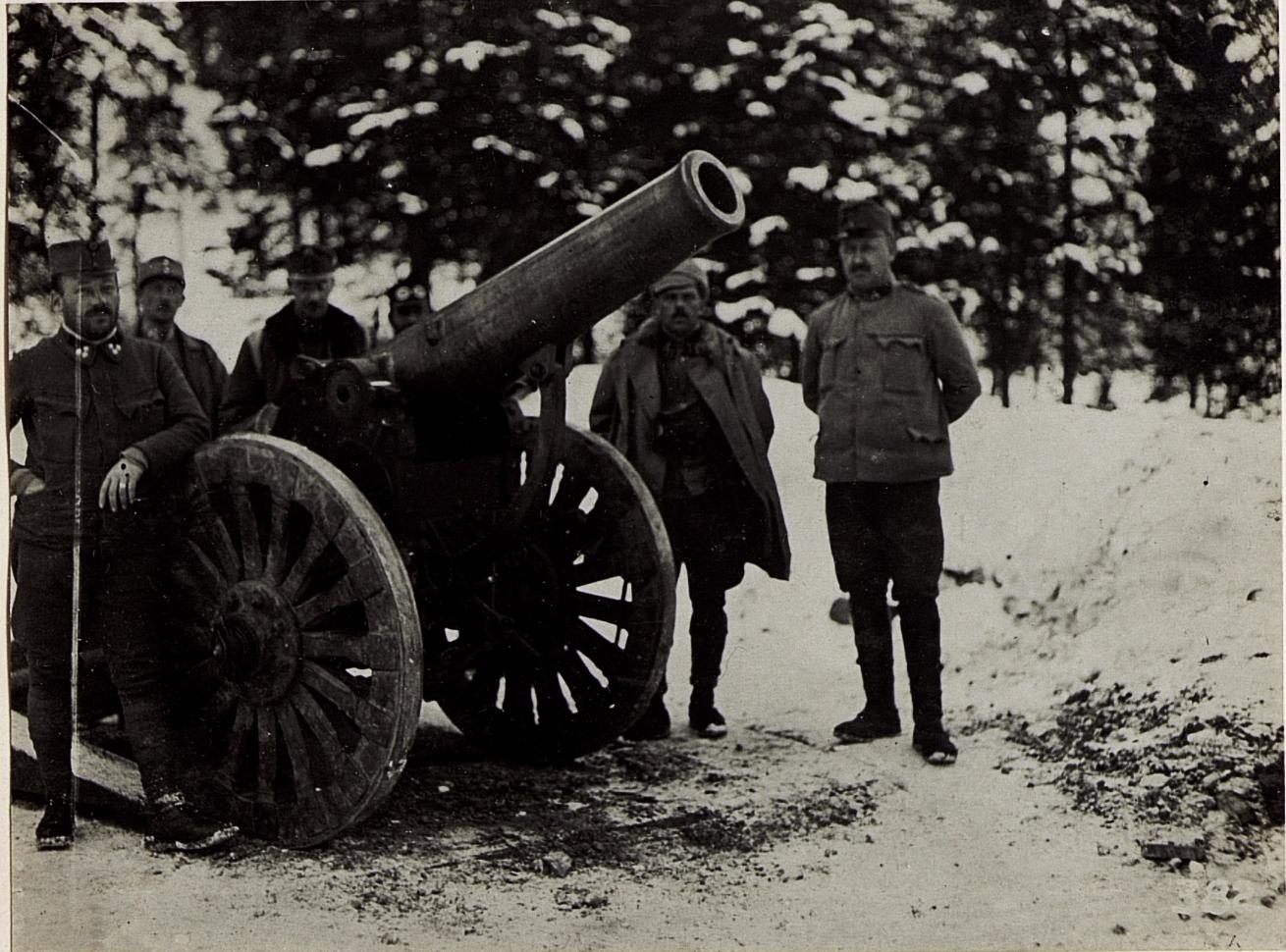
- Type: Heavy howitzer
- Place of origin: Austria-Hungary

Service history
- In service: 1894–1918
- Used by: Austria-Hungary
- Wars: World War I

Production history
- Designed: 1891–1894
- Variants: M 94/4, M 99, M 99/4

Specifications
- Shell: separate-loading, bagged charge
- Caliber: 149 millimetres (5.9 in)
- Breech: Horizontal flat wedge
- Recoil: none
- Carriage: Box trail
- Traverse: none
- Maximum firing range: approximately 6,000 metres (6,600 yd)

The 15 cm schwere Feldhaubitze M 94 was a heavy howitzer used by Austria-Hungary in World War I. It had a bronze barrel and relied on wheel ramps to absorb its recoil. The barrel was modified in 1899 as the M 99 and can be identified by its octagonal shape. Both howitzers could be mounted on a wide variety of carriages to suit their mission, including a carriage only 1.13 metres (44 in) wide for mountain use. Around the start of the 20th century both the M 94 and M 99 were modified to increase their elevation up to 65°. The elevation arc had to be extended and the trunnion mounts and wheels had to be strengthened to withstand the greater recoil forces when firing at high elevation. They were known as the M 94/4 and the M 99/4 after modification.

== Photo Gallery ==
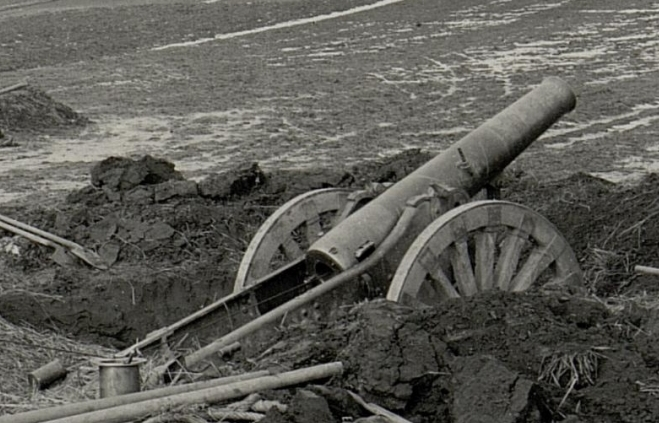
A M94 with its round breech.

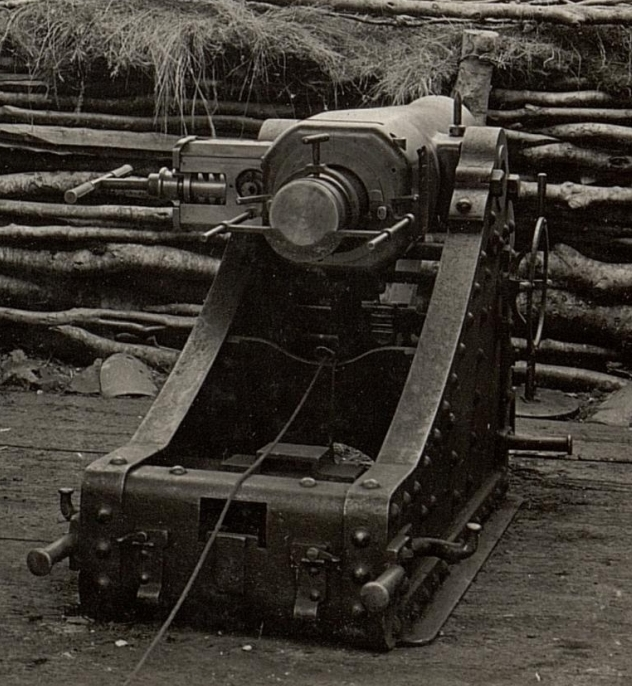
A M99 with its octagonal breech.

== See also ==
- BL 6 inch 30 cwt howitzer : British equivalent
- 152 mm howitzer M1910 : French/Russian equivalent
