= French Army order of battle (1914) =

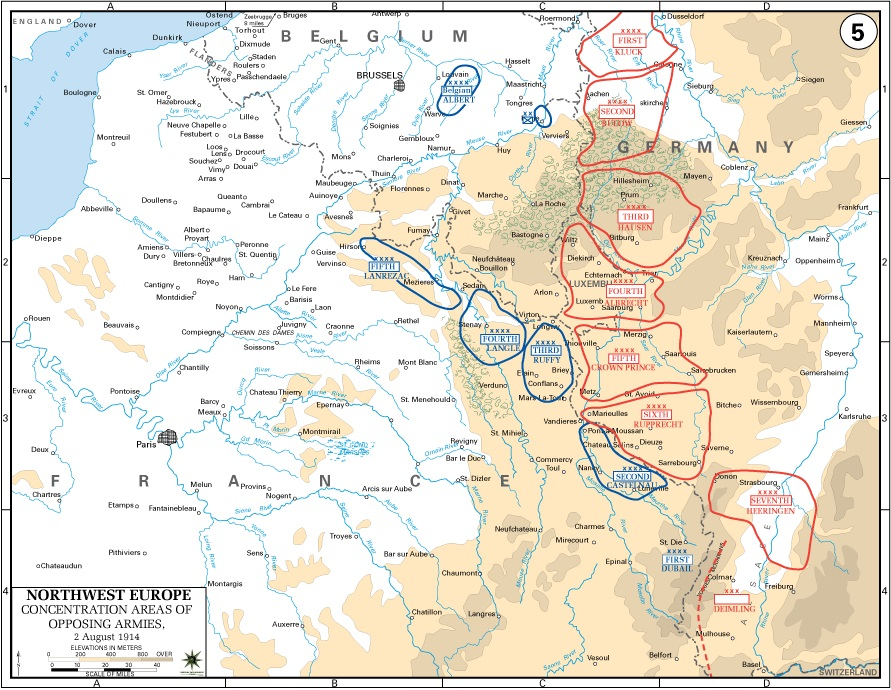
French Army order of battle on 2 August 1914

The order of the battle of the French Army in August 1914 was planned according to the mobilisation and concentration Plan XVII and applied on 2 August 1914, the day before the German Empire declared war. The order of battle is similar to the German Army with several armies each having army corps of two infantry divisions, with a number of reserve units at the disposal of the Commander in Chief and Minister of War. The organisation changed during August with the assignment of new reserve units and the creation of new armies.

== Organisation ==
=== Peacetime Organisation ===
The peacetime army had, in the spring of 1914, a strength of 882,907 men, with 686,993 in metropolitan France, 62,598 in Algeria and Tunisia, 81,750 in Morocco, and 51,566 auxiliaries.

The territory of the French Republic was divided into 21 military regions, 20 in metropolitan France, and one in Algeria (the 19th). Each region provided two infantry divisions, except the 6th which had three divisions.

The army had 686 infantry battalions. Metropolitan France had 173 infantry regiments, each with three battalions (nine regiments had four), as well as 31 light infantry (French: chasseur à pied) battalions, and 12 colonial infantry regiments (each with three battalions). In the colonies, there was four regiments of Zouaves with six battalions, 9 regiments of Algerian riflemen (French: tirailleurs algériens) with 40 battalions, 2 regiments of the Foreign Legion with six battalions, 5 battalions of African light infantry, 6 Moroccan colonial marching regiments, and 5 battalions of Moroccan auxiliaries.

The cavalry had 378 squadrons, organised into 89 regiments (each with four squadrons): 12 cuirassier, 32 dragoon, 21 light horse (French: chasseur à cheval), 14 hussar, 6 African light horse, and 4 Spahis.

The artillery had 855 batteries (each of four guns), organised into 62 field artillery regiments, 2 mountain artillery regiments, 11 foot artillery regiments, 5 heavy artillery regiments, 10 African artillery groups, and 3 colonial artillery regiments. It provided 42 divisional artillery (with three groups or nine batteries), 20 corps artillery (with four groups or twelve batteries), and 10 horse groups (with three batteries).

=== Mobilisation ===
The French army began mobilising on August 2, 1914 according to Plan XVII. The 680,000 peacetime troops were joined by 2,900,000 reservists and territorials. The three youngest classes of reservists were used to bring active units up to wartime strength, while new units were created from older reservists and territorials.

Each of 21 military regions provided an army corps of two infantry divisions. Each corps was numbered after the military region it was created from. The 19th region in Algeria did not form a corps, but did send its two divisions. A total of 46 infantry divisions were mobilised with 1,054,000 men, and 10 cavalry divisions with 52,500 men.

Each infantry division is composed of two infantry brigades with two regiments, plus a cavalry squadron, an artillery regiment (with three groups) and an engineer company. Each cavalry division is made up of three brigades with two regiments, plus a cyclist group, an artillery group and a detachment of cyclist engineers. Each army corps is made up of two infantry divisions (except the 6th corps with three divisions) with corps troops of a cavalry regiment (with four squadrons), an artillery regiment (with four groups), and an engineering battalion (with four companies).

Then, reserve infantry regiments are formed from the active regiments. They are given the same number as the active regiment plus 200. Reserve infantry regiments had two battalions, compared with three for the active regiments. These are grouped into 25 reserve infantry divisions numbered from 51 to 75 (numbered after their military region plus 50). These reserve divisions had a total of 450,000 men.

The active and reserve regiments are each created from roughly 50/50 active and reserve personnel. To show this continuity, the active battalions were numbered 1, 2, and 3, while the reserve battalions were numbered 5 and 6.

The oldest were placed into territorial infantry regiments with three or four battalions, some of which were used to create 12 territorial infantry divisions with 184,600 men.

The wartime army increased to:

- 1,525 infantry battalions (642 active, 406 reserve and 410 territorial), of approximately 1,100 men (with four companies of 254 men);
- 545 cavalry squadrons (316 active, 176 reserve and 37 territorial) of approximately 120 men (in four platoons of 30 cavalrymen);
- 1,468 artillery batteries (1,042 active, 265 reserve and 161 territorial), each of four guns (a group usually has three batteries);
- 508 engineering companies and detachments.

Added to the 95 active, reserve and territorial divisions with 1,681,100 men are the army troops of 187,500 men, garrisons of 821,400 men, depots of 680,000 men, and railway guards of 210,000 men.

== Order of Battle — First-line Units ==
Armies deployed north to south

=== Fifth Army ===
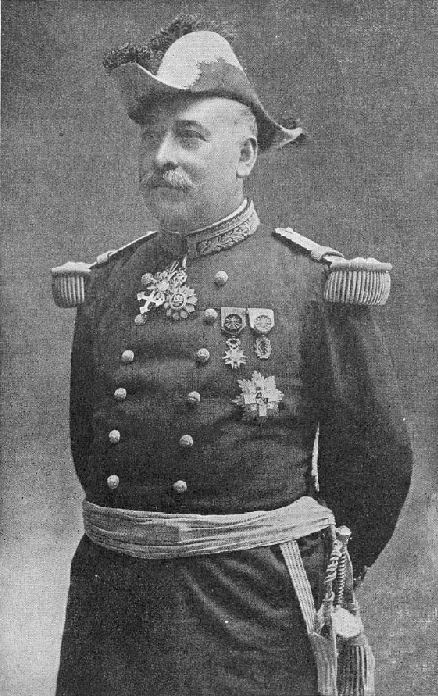
Charles Lanrezac

The Fifth Army (French: 5^{re} Armée) was commanded by General Charles Lanrezac. In August 1914 it was concentrated between Hirson and Dun-sur-Meus, with the mission of guarding the border with Belgium. Its strength on mobilisation was 8,886 officers, 290,464 NCOs and men, and 108,360 horses organised into five corps of ten infantry divisions, two reserve infantry divisions, and one cavalry division.

Army troops

1st Heavy Artillery Regiment

Two groups (seven batteries) of 155mm CTR
Two groups (six batteries) of 120mm Baquet

4th Heavy Artillery Regiment

One group (four batteries) of 120mm Long

9th Telegraph Engineer Company
Radio Detachment G, 7th Engineer Regiment
Pontoon Engineer Company 24/2, 7th Engineer Regiment
Aviation Squadrons DO 4, DO 6, C.11, N 12, REP 15, and V 24

52nd Reserve Infantry Division
Commander: Hyacinthe Clément Justin Coquet

103rd Infantry Brigade

291st Infantry Regiment (reserve)
347th Infantry Regiment (reserve)
348th Infantry Regiment (reserve)

104th Infantry Brigade

245th Infantry Regiment (reserve)
320th Infantry Regiment (reserve)

5th and 6th Squadrons, 21st Dragoon Regiment
17th Field Artillery Regiment (one group)
29th Field Artillery Regiment (one group)
42nd Field Artillery Regiment (one group)
Companies 2/13, 2/19, and 2/24, 1st Engineer Regiment
Transmission Detachment, 8th Engineer Regiment

60th Reserve Infantry Division
Commander: Géraud Réveilhac

119th Infantry Brigade

247th Infantry Regiment (reserve)
248th Infantry Regiment (reserve)
271st Infantry Regiment (reserve)

120th Infantry Brigade

202nd Infantry Regiment (reserve)
225th Infantry Regiment (reserve)
336th Infantry Regiment (reserve)

5th and 6th Squadrons, 24th Dragoon Regiment
7th Field Artillery Regiment (one group)
10th Field Artillery Regiment (one group)
50th Field Artillery Regiment (one group)
Companies 10/13, 10/19, and 10/24, 1st Engineer Regiment
Transmission Detachment, 8th Engineer Regiment

4th Cavalry Division
Commander: Abonneau

3rd Cuirassier Brigade

3rd Cuirassier Regiment
6th Cuirassier Regiment

4th Dragoon Brigade

28th Dragoon Regiment
30th Dragoon Regiment

4th Light Cavalry Brigade

2nd Hussar Regiment
4th Hussar Regiment

4th Cyclist Group, 19th Light Infantry Battalion
4th Group, 40th Field Artillery Regiment
Cyclist Engineers, 9th Engineer Regiment

==== I Corps ====
Commander: Louis Franchet d'Espèrey

Corps troops

201st Infantry Regiment (reserve)
284th Infantry Regiment (reserve)
6th Light Horse Regiment
41st Field Artillery Regiment
1st Foot Artillery Regiment
Companies 1/3, 1/4, 1/16, and 1/21, 3rd Engineer Regiment

1st Infantry Division
Commander: Marie Alexandre Gallet

1st Infantry Brigade

43rd Infantry Regiment
127th Infantry Regiment

2nd Infantry Brigade

1st Infantry Regiment
84th Infantry Regiment

5th Squadron, 6th Light Horse Regiment
15th Field Artillery Regiment
Company 1/1, 3rd Engineer Regiment

2nd Infantry Division
Commander: Henry Victor Deligny

3rd Infantry Brigade

33rd Infantry Regiment
73rd Infantry Regiment

4th Infantry Brigade

8th Infantry Regiment
110th Infantry Regiment

6th Squadron, 6th Light Horse Regiment
27th Field Artillery Regiment
Company 1/2, 3rd Engineer Regiment

==== II Corps ====
Commander: Augustin Gérard

Corps troops

272nd Infantry Regiment (reserve)
338th Infantry Regiment (reserve)
19th Light Horse Regiment
29th Field Artillery Regiment
Companies 2/3, 2/4, 2/16, and 2/21, 3rd Engineer Regiment

3rd Infantry Division
Commander: Charles Louis Jacques Régnault

5th Infantry Brigade

72nd Infantry Regiment
128th Infantry Regiment

6th Infantry Brigade

51st Infantry Regiment
87th Infantry Regiment

5th Squadron, 19th Light Horse Regiment
17th Field Artillery Regiment
Company 2/1, 3rd Engineer Regiment

4th Infantry Division
Commander: Charles Rabier

7th Infantry Brigade

91st Infantry Regiment
147th Infantry Regiment

8th Infantry Brigade

45th Infantry Regiment
148th Infantry Regiment

87th Infantry Brigade

120th Infantry Regiment
9th Light Infantry Battalion
18th Light Infantry Battalion

16th Dragoon Regiment (two squadrons)
30th Dragoon Regiment (one squadron)
42nd Field Artillery Regiment (four batteries)
Company 2/2, 3rd Engineer Regiment

==== III Corps ====
Commander: Henry Sauret

Corps troops

239th Infantry Regiment (reserve)
274th Infantry Regiment (reserve)
7th Light Horse Regiment
11th Field Artillery Regiment

5th Infantry Division
Commander: Élie Verrier

9th Infantry Brigade

39th Infantry Regiment
74th Infantry Regiment

10th Infantry Brigade

36th Infantry Regiment
129th Infantry Regiment

5th Squadron, 7th Light Horse Regiment
43rd Field Artillery Regiment
Company 3/1, 3rd Engineer Regiment

6th Infantry Division
Commander: Georges Bloch

11th Infantry Brigade

24th Infantry Regiment
28th Infantry Regiment

12th Infantry Brigade

5th Infantry Regiment
119th Infantry Regiment

6th Squadron, 7th Light Horse Regiment
22nd Field Artillery Regiment
Company 3/2, 3rd Engineer Regiment

==== X Corps ====
Commander: Gilbert Desforges

Corps troops

241st Infantry Regiment (reserve)
270th Infantry Regiment (reserve)
13th Hussar Regiment
50th Field Artillery Regiment

19th Infantry Division
Commander: Gaëtan Bonnier

37th Infantry Brigade

48th Infantry Regiment
71st Infantry Regiment

38th Infantry Brigade

41st Infantry Regiment
70th Infantry Regiment

5th Squadron, 13th Hussar Regiment
7th Field Artillery Regiment
Company 10/1, 6th Engineer Regiment

20th Infantry Division
Commander: Elie Boë

39th Infantry Brigade

25th Infantry Regiment
136th Infantry Regiment

40th Infantry Brigade

2nd Infantry Regiment
47th Infantry Regiment

6th Squadron, 13th Hussar Regiment
10th Field Artillery Regiment
Company 10/2, 6th Engineer Regiment

==== XI Corps ====
Commander: Joseph-Paul Eydoux

Corps troops

293rd Infantry Regiment (reserve)
317th Infantry Regiment (reserve)
2nd Light Horse Regiment
28th Field Artillery Regiment
3rd Foot Artillery Regiment
Companies 11/3, 11/4, 11/16, and 11/21, 6th Engineer Regiment

21st Infantry Division
Commander: René Radiguet

41st Infantry Brigade

64th Infantry Regiment
65th Infantry Regiment

42nd Infantry Brigade

93rd Infantry Regiment
137th Infantry Regiment

5th Squadron, 2nd Light Horse Regiment
51st Field Artillery Regiment
Company 11/1, 6th Engineer Regiment

22nd Infantry Division
Commander: Joseph Pambet

43rd Infantry Brigade

62nd Infantry Regiment
116th Infantry Regiment

44th Infantry Brigade

19th Infantry Regiment
118th Infantry Regiment

6th Squadron, 2nd Light Horse Regiment
35th Field Artillery Regiment
Company 11/2, 6th Engineer Regiment

=== Fourth Army ===
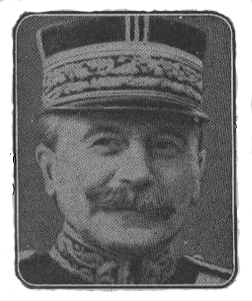
Fernand de Langle de Cary

The Fourth Army (French: 4^{re} Armée) was commanded by General Fernand de Langle de Cary. In August 1914, it was concentrated between Saint-Dizier and Bar-le-Duc, with the mission of being held in reserve in the Argonne Region. Its strength on mobilisation was 4,689 officers, 154,899 NCOs and men, and 58,491 horses organised into three corps of four infantry divisions, two colonial infantry divisions, and one cavalry division.

Army troops

2nd Heavy Artillery Regiment

One group (three batteries) of 155mm CTR

4th Telegraph Engineer Company
Radio Detachment F, 7th Engineer Regiment
Pontoon Engineer Company 24/1, 7th Engineer Regiment

Aviation Squadrons V 14 and V 21

9th Cavalry Division
Commander: Jean de l'Espée

1st Cuirassier Brigade

5th Cuirassier Regiment
8th Cuirassier Regiment

9th Dragoon Brigade

1st Dragoon Regiment
3rd Dragoon Regiment

16th Dragoon Brigade

24th Dragoon Regiment
25th Dragoon Regiment

9th Cyclist Group, 25th Light Infantry Battalion
4th Group, 33rd Field Artillery Regiment
Cyclist Engineers, 6th Engineer Regiment

==== XII Corps ====
Commander: Pierre Auguste Roques

Corps troops

300th Infantry Regiment (reserve)
326th Infantry Regiment (reserve)
21st Light Horse Regiment (four squadrons)
52nd Field Artillery Regiment
Companies 12/3, 12/4, 12/16, and 12/21, 6th Engineer Regiment

23rd Infantry Division
Commander: Charles Leblond

45th Infantry Brigade

63rd Infantry Regiment
78th Infantry Regiment

46th Infantry Brigade

107th Infantry Regiment
138th Infantry Regiment

21st Light Horse Regiment (one squadron)
21st Field Artillery Regiment
Company 21/1, 6th Engineer Regiment

24th Infantry Division
Commander: Garreau de la Mèchenie

47th Infantry Brigade

50th Infantry Regiment
108th Infantry Regiment

48th Infantry Brigade

100th Infantry Regiment
126th Infantry Regiment

21st Light Horse Regiment (one squadron)
34th Field Artillery Regiment
Company 12/2, 6th Engineer Regiment

==== XVII Corps ====
Commander: Arthur Joseph Poline

Corps troops

207th Infantry Regiment (reserve)
209th Infantry Regiment (reserve)
9th Light Horse Regiment
57th Field Artillery Regiment

33rd Infantry Division
Commander: François de Villeméjane

65th Infantry Brigade

7th Infantry Regiment
9th Infantry Regiment

66th Infantry Brigade

11th Infantry Regiment
20th Infantry Regiment

5th Squadron, 9th Light Horse Regiment
18th Field Artillery Regiment
Company 17/1, 2nd Engineer Regiment

34th Infantry Division
Commander: Henri Alby

67th Infantry Brigade

14th Infantry Regiment
83rd Infantry Regiment

68th Infantry Brigade

59th Infantry Regiment
88th Infantry Regiment

6th Squadron, 9th Light Horse Regiment
23rd Field Artillery Regiment
Company 17/2, 2nd Engineer Regiment

==== Colonial Corps ====
Commander: Jules Lefèvre

Corps troops

5th Colonial Infantry Brigade

21st Colonial Infantry Regiment
23rd Colonial Infantry Regiment

3rd African Horse Regiment
3rd Colonial Field Artillery Regiment (four groups)
Companies 22/2, 22/4, 22/16, and 22/31, 1st Engineer Regiment

2nd Colonial Infantry Division
Commander: Paul Leblois

4th Colonial Infantry Brigade

4th Colonial Infantry Regiment
8th Colonial Infantry Regiment

6th Colonial Infantry Brigade

22nd Colonial Infantry Regiment
24th Colonial Infantry Regiment

5th Squadron, 6th Dragoon Regiment
1st Colonial Artillery Regiment
Company 22/1, 1st Engineer Regiment

3rd Colonial Infantry Division
Commander: Léon Raffenel

1st Colonial Infantry Brigade

1st Colonial Infantry Regiment
2nd Colonial Infantry Regiment

3rd Colonial Infantry Brigade

3rd Colonial Infantry Regiment
7th Colonial Infantry Regiment

6th Squadron, 6th Dragoon Regiment
2nd Colonial Artillery Regiment
Company 22/3, 1st Engineer Regiment

=== Third Army ===
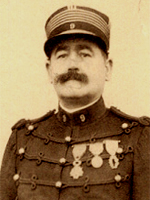
Pierre Ruffey

The Third Army (French: 3^{re} Armée) was commanded by General Pierre Ruffey. In August 1914 it was concentrated between Saint-Mihiel and Verdun, with the mission of holding the Germans in their defensive positions before Metz. Its strength on mobilisation was 6,786 officers, 230,471 NCOs and men, and 80,381 horses organised into three corps of seven infantry divisions, three reserve infantry divisions, and one cavalry division.

Army troops

2nd Heavy Artillery Regiment

One group (three batteries) of 155mm CTR
One group (three batteries) of 120mm Baquet

4th Heavy Artillery Regiment

Three groups (twelve batteries) of 120mm Long

4th Telegraph Engineer Company
Radio Detachment F, 7th Engineer Regiment
24/1st Pontoon Engineer Company, 24th Battalion, 7th Engineer Regiment
Aviation Squadrons MF 2, HF 7, HF 13, MF 16, and DO 22

7th Cavalry Division

6th Cuirassier Brigade

11th Cuirassier Regiment
12th Cuirassier Regiment

1st Dragoon Brigade

7th Dragoon Regiment
13th Dragoon Regiment

7th Light Cavalry Brigade

1st Light Horse Regiment
20th Light Horse Regiment

7th Cyclist Group, 4th Light Infantry Battalion
4th Group, 30th Field Artillery Regiment
Cyclist Engineers, 8th Engineer Regiment

==== IV Corps ====
Commander: Victor René Boëlle

Corps Troops

315th Infantry Regiment (reserve)
317th Infantry Regiment (reserve)
14th Hussar Regiment
44th Field Artillery Regiment

7th Infantry Division
Commander: Edgard de Trentinian

13th Infantry Brigade

101st Infantry Regiment
102nd Infantry Regiment

14th Infantry Brigade

103rd Infantry Regiment
104th Infantry Regiment

14th Hussar Regiment (one squadron)
25th Field Artillery Regiment
Company 4/1, 1st Engineer Regiment

8th Infantry Division
Commander: Raoul de Lartigue

15th Infantry Brigade

124th Infantry Regiment
130th Infantry Regiment

16th Infantry Brigade

115th Infantry Regiment
117th Infantry Regiment

14th Hussar Regiment (one squadron)
31st Field Artillery Regiment
Company 4/2, 1st Engineer Regiment

==== V Corps ====
Commander: Charles Brochin

Corps Troops

313th Infantry Regiment (reserve)
331st Infantry Regiment (reserve)
8th Light Horse Regiment
45th Field Artillery Regiment

9th Infantry Division
Commander: Pierre Peslin

17th Infantry Brigade

4th Infantry Regiment
82nd Infantry Regiment

18th Infantry Brigade

113th Infantry Regiment
131st Infantry Regiment

8th Light Horse Regiment (one squadron)
20th Field Artillery Regiment (four batteries)
Company 5/1, 1st Engineer Regiment

10th Infantry Division
Commander: Michel Auger

19th Infantry Brigade

46th Infantry Regiment
89th Infantry Regiment

20th Infantry Brigade

31st Infantry Regiment
76th Infantry Regiment

8th Light Horse Regiment (one squadron)
6th Field Artillery Regiment
Company 5/2, 1st Engineer Regiment

==== VI Corps ====
Commander: Maurice Sarrail

Corps troops

6th Company, Forest Hunters
1st Light Cavalry Brigade

10th Light Horse Regiment
12th Light Horse Regiment

46th Field Artillery Regiment
6th Foot Artillery Regiment

12th Infantry Division
Commander: Louis-Auguste-Didier Souchier

23rd Infantry Brigade

54th Infantry Regiment
67th Infantry Regiment

24th Infantry Brigade

106th Infantry Regiment
132nd Infantry Regiment

15th Light Horse Regiment (one squadron)
25th Field Artillery Regiment
Company 6/1, 9th Engineer Regiment

40th Infantry Division
Commander: Émile Hache

79th Infantry Brigade

154th Infantry Regiment
155th Infantry Regiment
26th Light Infantry Battalion

80th Infantry Brigade

150th Infantry Regiment
161st Infantry Regiment
25th Light Infantry Battalion
29th Light Infantry Battalion

10th Light Horse Regiment (one squadron)
12th Light Horse Regiment (one squadron)
40th Field Artillery Regiment (4 batteries)
Company 6/2, 9th Engineer Regiment

42nd Infantry Division
Commander: Martial Justin Verraux

83rd Infantry Brigade

94th Infantry Regiment
8th Light Infantry Battalion
16th Light Infantry Battalion
19th Light Infantry Battalion

84th Infantry Brigade

151st Infantry Regiment
162nd Infantry Regiment

2nd Light Horse Regiment (one squadron)
61st Field Artillery Regiment
Company 6/2, 9th Engineer Regiment

==== 3rd Group of Reserve Divisions ====
Commander: Paul Durand

54th Reserve Infantry Division
Commander: Chailley

107th Infantry Brigade

301st Infantry Regiment (reserve)
302nd Infantry Regiment (reserve)
303rd Infantry Regiment (reserve)

108th Infantry Brigade

324th Infantry Regiment (reserve)
330th Infantry Regiment (reserve)
363rd Infantry Regiment (reserve)

5th and 6th Squadrons, 1st Light Horse Regiment
26th Field Artillery Regiment (one group)
31st Field Artillery Regiment (one group)
44th Field Artillery Regiment (one group)
Transmission Detachment, 8th Engineer Regiment

55th Reserve Infantry Division
Commander: Louis Leguay

109th Infantry Brigade

204th Infantry Regiment (reserve)
282nd Infantry Regiment (reserve)
289th Infantry Regiment (reserve)

110th Infantry Brigade

231st Infantry Regiment (reserve)
246th Infantry Regiment (reserve)
276th Infantry Regiment (reserve)

32nd Dragoon Regiment (2 squadrons)
13th Field Artillery Regiment (one group)
30th Field Artillery Regiment (one group)
35th Field Artillery Regiment (one group)
Companies 5/13, 5/19, and 5/24, 6th Engineer Regiment
Transmission Detachment, 8th Engineer Regiment

56th Reserve Infantry Division
Commander: Frédéric Micheler

111st Infantry Brigade

294th Infantry Regiment (reserve)
354th Infantry Regiment (reserve)
355th Infantry Regiment (reserve)

112th Infantry Brigade

350th Infantry Regiment (reserve)
361st Infantry Regiment (reserve)

5th & 6th Squadrons, 13th Hussar Regiment
25th Field Artillery Regiment (one group)
32nd Field Artillery Regiment (one group)
40th Field Artillery Regiment (one group)
Companies 6/11, 6/17, and 6/22, 3rd Engineer Regiment
Transmission Detachment, 8th Engineer Regiment

=== Second Army ===
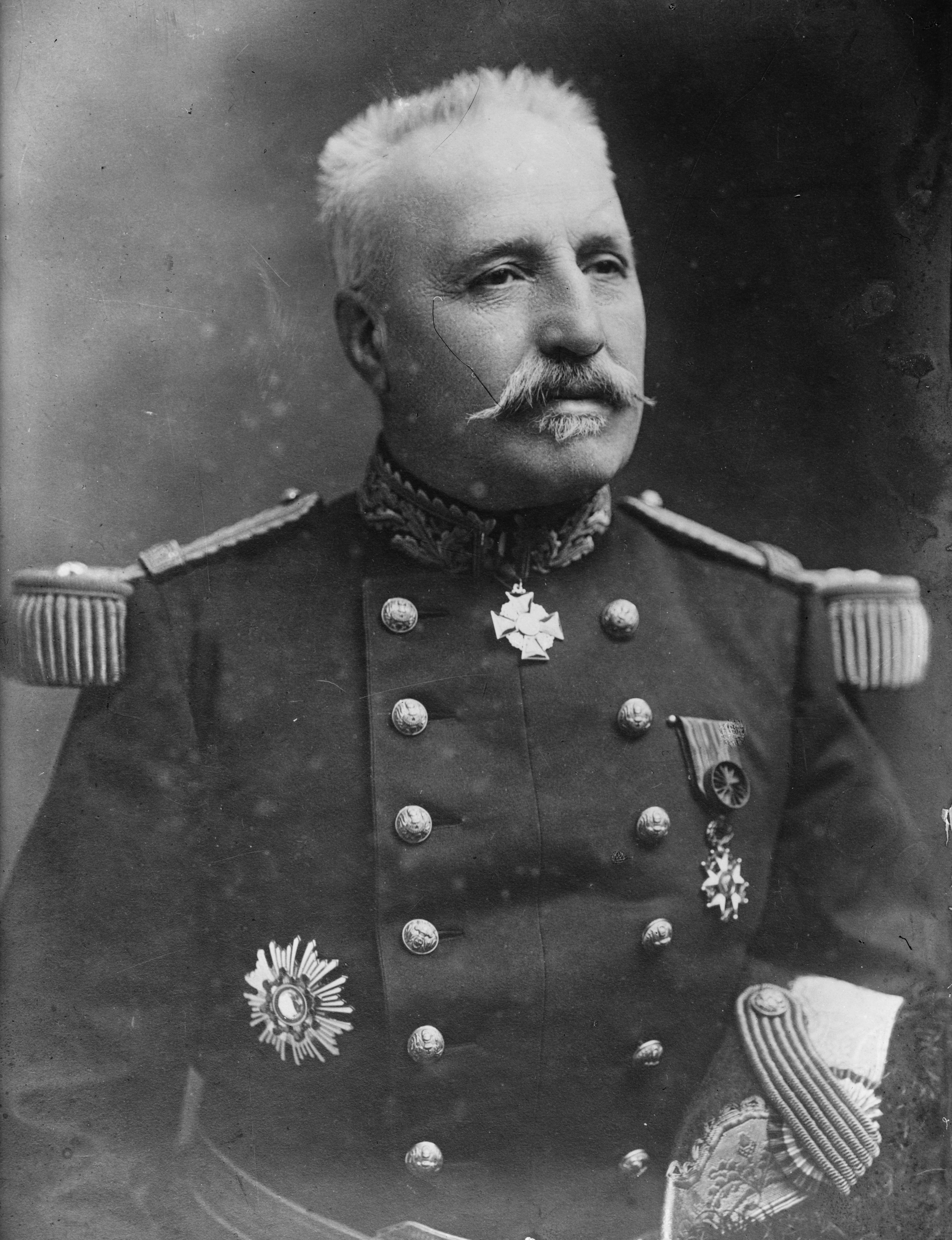
Édouard de Castelnau

The Second Army (French: 2^{re} Armée) was commanded by General Édouard de Castelnau. In August 1914 its major role in the campaign plan was to liberate Lorraine and attack into Germany. It was concentrated between Pont-Saint-Vincent and Neufchâteau, with the mission of attacking towards Morhange. Its strength on mobilisation was 9,391 officers, 314,804 NCOs and men, and 110,062 horses organised into five corps of ten infantry divisions, three reserve infantry divisions, and two cavalry divisions.

Army troops

3rd & 4th Heavy Artillery Regiments

Two groups (seven batteries) of 155mm CTR
Two groups (six batteries) of 120mm Baquet
One group (four batteries) of 120mm Long

1st Telegraph Engineer Company
23/2nd Pontoon Engineer Company, 23rd Battalion, 7th Engineer Regiment
Aviation Squadrons HF 1, MF 8, HF 19, MF 20, and MS 17

2nd Cavalry Division
Commander: Antide Lescot

2nd Dragoon Brigade

8th Dragoon Regiment
31st Dragoon Regiment

12th Dragoon Brigade

4th Dragoon Regiment
12th Dragoon Regiment

2nd Light Cavalry Brigade

17th Light Horse Regiment
18th Light Horse Regiment

2nd Cyclist Group, 2nd Light Infantry Battalion
4th Group, 8th Field Artillery Regiment
Cyclist Engineers, 10th Engineer Regiment

10th Cavalry Division
Commander: Louis Conneau

10th Dragoon Brigade

15th Dragoon Regiment
20th Dragoon Regiment

15th Dragoon Brigade

10th Dragoon Regiment
19th Dragoon Regiment

10th Cyclist Group, 1st Light Infantry Battalion
4th Group, 14th Field Artillery Regiment
Cyclist Engineers, 9th Engineer Regiment

==== IX Corps ====
Commander: Pierre Joseph Louis Alfred Dubois

Corps troops

268th Infantry Regiment (reserve)
290th Infantry Regiment (reserve)
7th Hussar Regiment (4 squadrons)
49th Field Artillery Regiment
Companies 9/3, 9/4, 9/16, and 9/21, 6th Engineer Regiment
Telegraph Detachment, 8th Engineer Regiment

17th Infantry Division
Commander: Noël Jean-Baptiste Henri Alphonse Dumas

33rd Infantry Brigade

68th Infantry Regiment
90th Infantry Regiment

34th Infantry Brigade

114th Infantry Regiment
125th Infantry Regiment

5th Squadron, 7th Hussar Regiment
20th Field Artillery Regiment
Company 9/1, 6th Engineer Regiment

18th Infantry Division
Commander: Justinien Lefèvre

35th Infantry Brigade

32nd Infantry Regiment
66th Infantry Regiment

36th Infantry Brigade

77th Infantry Regiment
135th Infantry Regiment

6th Squadron, 7th Hussar Regiment
33rd Field Artillery Regiment (4 groups)
Company 9/2, 6th Engineer Regiment

==== XV Corps ====
Commander: Louis Espinasse

Corps troops

6th Mountain Infantry Battalion
23rd Mountain Infantry Battalion
24th Mountain Infantry Battalion
27th Mountain Infantry Battalion
6th Hussar Regiment
38th Field Artillery Regiment
7th Foot Artillery Regiment
10th Foot Artillery Regiment

29th Infantry Division
Commander: Jean Baptiste Jules Carbillet

57th Infantry Brigade

111th Infantry Regiment
112th Infantry Regiment

58th Infantry Brigade
3rd Infantry Regiment
141st Infantry Regiment
5th Squadron, 6th Hussar Regiment
55th Field Artillery Regiment
Company 15/1, 7th Engineer Regiment

30th Infantry Division
Commander: Colle

59th Infantry Brigade

40th Infantry Regiment
58th Infantry Regiment

60th Infantry Brigade

55th Infantry Regiment
61st Infantry Regiment

6th Squadron, 6th Hussar Regiment
19th Field Artillery Regiment
Company 15/2, 7th Engineer Regiment

==== XVI Corps ====
Commander: Taverna

Corps troops

322nd Infantry Regiment (reserve)
342nd Infantry Regiment (reserve)
1st Hussar Regiment
9th Field Artillery Regiment

31st Infantry Division
Commander: Jean-Jacques Vidal

61st Infantry Brigade

81st Infantry Regiment
96th Infantry Regiment

62nd Infantry Brigade

122nd Infantry Regiment
142nd Infantry Regiment

5th Squadron, 1st Hussar Regiment
56th Field Artillery Regiment
Company 16/1, 2nd Engineer Regiment

32nd Infantry Division
Commander: Bouchez

63rd Infantry Brigade

53rd Infantry Regiment
80th Infantry Regiment

64th Infantry Brigade

15th Infantry Regiment
143rd Infantry Regiment

6th Squadron, 1st Hussar Regiment
3rd Field Artillery Regiment
Company 16/2, 2nd Engineer Regiment

==== XVIII Corps ====
Commander: Jacques Marie Armand de Mas-Latrie

Corps troops

218th Infantry Regiment (reserve)
342nd Infantry Regiment (reserve)
10th Hussar Regiment
58th Field Artillery Regiment

35th Infantry Division
Commander: Charles Exelmans

69th Infantry Brigade

6th Infantry Regiment
123rd Infantry Regiment

70th Infantry Brigade

57th Infantry Regiment
144th Infantry Regiment

5th Squadron, 10th Hussar Regiment
24th Field Artillery Regiment
Company 18/1, 2nd Engineer Regiment

36th Infantry Division
Commander: Jouannic

71st Infantry Brigade

34th Infantry Regiment
49th Infantry Regiment

72nd Infantry Brigade

12th Infantry Regiment
18th Infantry Regiment

6th Squadron, 10th Hussar Regiment
14th Field Artillery Regiment (4 batteries)
Company 18/2, 2nd Engineer Regiment

==== XX Corps ====
Commander: Ferdinand Foch

Corps troops

41st Colonial Infantry Regiment
43rd Colonial Infantry Regiment
5th Hussar Regiment
60th Field Artillery Regiment
6th Foot Artillery Regiment

11th Infantry Division
Commander: Maurice Balfourier

21st Infantry Brigade

26th Infantry Regiment
69th Infantry Regiment
2nd Light Infantry Battalion
4th Light Infantry Battalion

22nd Infantry Brigade

37th Infantry Regiment
79th Infantry Regiment

5th Squadron, 5th Hussar Regiment
8th Field Artillery Regiment (4 batteries)
Company 20/1, 10th Engineer Regiment

39th Infantry Division
Commander: Georges Dantant

77th Infantry Brigade

146th Infantry Regiment
153rd Infantry Regiment

78th Infantry Brigade

156th Infantry Regiment
160th Infantry Regiment

6th Squadron, 5th Hussar Regiment
39th Field Artillery Regiment
Company 20/2, 10th Engineer Regiment

==== 2nd Group of Reserve Divisions ====
Commander: Léon Durand

59th Reserve Infantry Division
Commander: Charlery de la Masselière

117th Infantry Brigade

232nd Infantry Regiment (reserve)
314th Infantry Regiment (reserve)
325th Infantry Regiment (reserve)

118th Infantry Brigade

226th Infantry Regiment (reserve)
277th Infantry Regiment (reserve)
335th Infantry Regiment (reserve)

25th Dragoon Regiment (2 squadrons)
20th Field Artillery Regiment (one group)
33rd Field Artillery Regiment (one group)
49th Field Artillery Regiment (one group)
Companies 9/13, 9/19, and 9/24, 6th Engineer Regiment
Transmission Detachment, 8th Engineer Regiment

68th Reserve Infantry Division
Commander: Émile Brun d'Aubignosc

135th Infantry Brigade

206th Infantry Regiment (reserve)
234th Infantry Regiment (reserve)
323rd Infantry Regiment (reserve)

136th Infantry Brigade

212th Infantry Regiment (reserve)
257th Infantry Regiment (reserve)
344th Infantry Regiment (reserve)

15th Dragoon Regiment (2 squadrons)
14th Field Artillery Regiment (one group)
24th Field Artillery Regiment (one group)
58th Field Artillery Regiment (one group)
Companies 18/13, 18/19, and 18/24, 2nd Engineer Regiment
Transmission Detachment, 8th Engineer Regiment

70th Reserve Infantry Division
Commander: Charles Bizard

139th Infantry Brigade

226th Infantry Regiment (reserve)
269th Infantry Regiment (reserve)
42nd Light Infantry Battalion (reserve)

Infantry Brigade

237th Infantry Regiment (reserve)
279th Infantry Regiment (reserve)
360th Infantry Regiment (reserve)

23rd Dragoon Regiment (2 squadrons)
38th Field Artillery Regiment (one group)
60th Field Artillery Regiment (one group)
5th Field Artillery Regiment (one group)
Companies 20/11, 20/17, 20/22, 10th Engineer Regiment

=== First Army ===
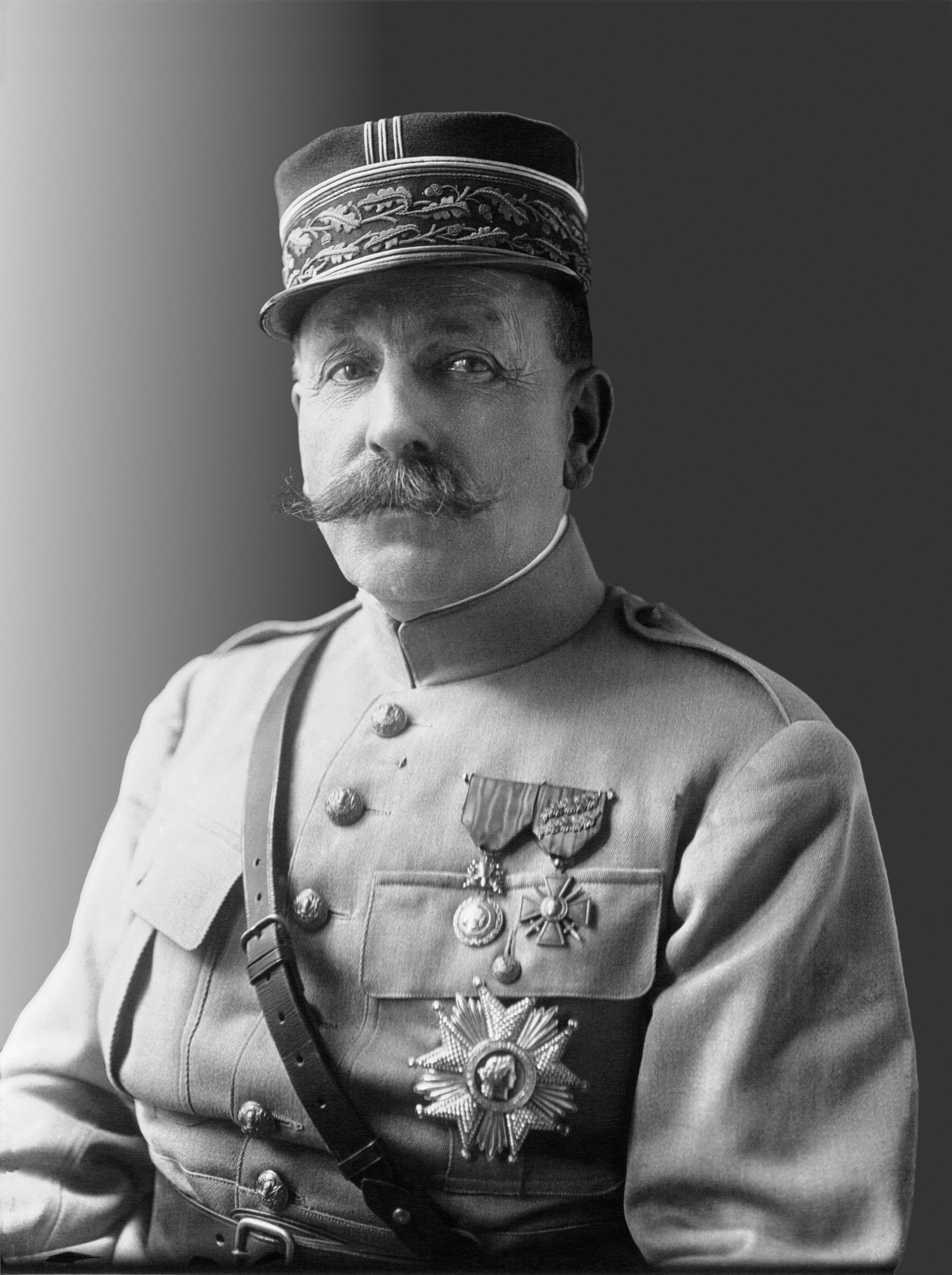
Augustin Dubail

The First Army (French: 1^{re} Armée) was commanded by General Auguste Dubail. In August 1914 it constituted the right wing of the French Army, concentrated between Remiremont and Charmes, with the mission of attacking towards Mulhouse and Sarrebourg. Its strength on mobilisation was 7,588 officers, 258,864 NCOs and men, and 92,106 horses organised into five corps of ten infantry divisions, and two cavalry divisions.

Army troops

5th Heavy Artillery Regiment

Two groups (six batteries) of 120mm Baquet
Two groups (six batteries) of 155mm CTR

1st Telegraph Engineer Company
23/1st Pontoon Engineer Company, 23rd Battalion, 7th Engineer Regiment
Aviation Squadrons BL 3, BL 9, BL 10, BL 18, and MF 5

6th Cavalry Division
Commander: Georges Édouard Levillain

5th Cuirassier Brigade

7th Cuirassier Regiment
10th Cuirassier Regiment

6th Dragoon Brigade

2nd Dragoon Regiment
14th Dragoon Regiment

6th Light Cavalry Brigade

13th Light Horse Regiment
11th Hussar Regiment

6th Cyclist Group, 13th Mountain Infantry Battalion
4th Group, 54th Field Artillery Regiment
Cyclist Engineers, 4th Engineer Regiment

8th Cavalry Division
Commander: Louis Dominique Achille Aubier

8th Dragoon Brigade

11th Dragoon Regiment
18th Dragoon Regiment

14th Dragoon Brigade

17th Dragoon Regiment
26th Dragoon Regiment

8th Light Cavalry Brigade

12th Hussar Regiment
14th Light Horse Regiment

8th Cyclist Group, 15th Mountain Infantry Battalion
4th Group, 4th Field Artillery Regiment
Cyclist Engineers, 9th Engineer Regiment

==== VII Corps ====
Commander: Louis Bonneau

Corps troops

352nd Infantry Regiment (reserve)
45th Light Infantry Battalion
55th Light Infantry Battalion
7th, 11th, and 12th companies, Forest Hunters
11th Light Horse Regiment
5th Field Artillery Regiment
Companies 7/3, 7/4, 7/16, and 7/21, 11th Engineer Regiment

14th Infantry Division
Commander: Louis Curé

27th Infantry Brigade

44th Infantry Regiment
60th Infantry Regiment

28th Infantry Brigade

35th Infantry Regiment
42nd Infantry Regiment

5th Squadron, 11th Light Horse Regiment
47th Field Artillery Regiment
Company 7/1, 11th Engineer Regiment

41st Infantry Division
Commander: Paul Superbie

81st Infantry Brigade

152nd Infantry Regiment
5th Light Infantry Battalion
15th Light Infantry Battalion

82nd Infantry Brigade

23rd Infantry Regiment
133rd Infantry Regiment

6th Squadron, 11th Light Horse Regiment
4th Field Artillery Regiment
Company 7/2, 11th Engineer Regiment

==== VIII Corps ====
Commander: Marie Joseph Louis Dominique de Castelli

Corps troops

210th Infantry Regiment (reserve)
227th Infantry Regiment (reserve)
16th Light Horse Regiment
37th Field Artillery Regiment
Companies 8/3, 8/4, 8/16, and 8/21, 4th Engineer Regiment

15th Infantry Division
Commander: Léon Bajolle

29th Infantry Brigade

56th Infantry Regiment
134th Infantry Regiment

30th Infantry Brigade

10th Infantry Regiment
27th Infantry Regiment

5th Squadron, 16th Light Horse Regiment
48th Field Artillery Regiment
Company 8/1, 4th Engineer Regiment

16th Infantry Division
Commander: Louis Ernest de Maud'huy

31st Infantry Brigade

85th Infantry Regiment
95th Infantry Regiment

32nd Infantry Brigade

13th Infantry Regiment
29th Infantry Regiment

6th Squadron, 16th Light Horse Regiment
1st Field Artillery Regiment
Company 8/2, 4th Engineer Regiment

==== XIII Corps ====
Commander: César Alix

Corps troops

41st Light Infantry Battalion
43rd Light Infantry Battalion
50th Light Infantry Battalion
71st Light Infantry Battalion
3rd Light Horse Regiment
53rd Field Artillery Regiment
Companies 13/3, 13/4, 13/16, and 13/21, 4th Engineer Regiment
Communications Detachment, 8th Engineer Regiment

25th Infantry Division
Commander: Gaston Delétoille

49th Infantry Brigade

38th Infantry Regiment
86th Infantry Regiment

50th Infantry Brigade

16th Infantry Regiment
98th Infantry Regiment

5th Squadron, 3rd Light Horse Regiment
36th Field Artillery Regiment
Company 13/1, 4th Engineer Regiment

26th Infantry Division
Commander: Gustave Silhol

51st Infantry Brigade

105th Infantry Regiment
121st Infantry Regiment

52nd Infantry Brigade

92nd Infantry Regiment
139th Infantry Regiment

6th Squadron, 3rd Light Horse Regiment
16th Field Artillery Regiment
Company 13/2, 4th Engineer Regiment

==== XIV Corps ====
Commander: Paul Pouradier-Duteil

Corps Troops

2nd Colonial Infantry Brigade

5th Colonial Infantry Regiment
6th Colonial Infantry Regiment

9th Light Horse Regiment
6th Field Artillery Regiment
5th Heavy Artillery Regiment
11th Foot Artillery Regiment
Companies 14/3, 14/6, 14/16, and 14/21, 4th Engineer Regiment
Communications Detachment, 8th Engineer Regiment

27th Infantry Division
Commander: Joseph Louis Alphonse Baret

53rd Infantry Brigade

75th Infantry Regiment
140th Infantry Regiment

Glenoble Mountain Group

14th Mountain Infantry Battalion
2nd Battery, 1st Mountain Artillery Regiment

54th Infantry Brigade

52nd Infantry Regiment

Draguignan Mountain Group

7th Mountain Infantry Battalion
2nd Battery, 2nd Mountain Artillery Regiment

5th Squadron, 9th Light Horse Regiment
2nd Field Artillery Regiment
Company 14/1, 4th Engineer Regiment

28th Infantry Division
Commander: Henri Putz

55th Infantry Brigade

22nd Infantry Regiment
99th Infantry Regiment

56th Infantry Brigade

30th Infantry Regiment

Annecy Mountain Group

11th Mountain Infantry Battalion
3rd Battery, 1st Mountain Artillery Regiment

9th Squadron, 9th Light Horse Regiment
54th Field Artillery Regiment
Company 14/2, 4th Engineer Regiment

==== XXI Corps ====
Commander: Émile Edmond Legrand-Girarde

Corps troops

57th Light Infantry Battalion
60th Light Infantry Battalion
61st Light Infantry Battalion
4th Light Horse Regiment
59th Field Artillery Regiment

13th Infantry Division
Commander: Frédéric Edmond Bourdériat

25th Infantry Brigade

17th Infantry Regiment
17th Light Infantry Battalion
20th Light Infantry Battalion
21st Light Infantry Battalion

26th Infantry Brigade

21st Infantry Regiment
109th Infantry Regiment

5th Squadron, 4th Light Horse Regiment
62nd Field Artillery Regiment
Company 21/1, 11th Engineer Regiment

43rd Infantry Division
Commander: Pierre Lanquetot

85th Infantry Brigade

158th Infantry Regiment
149th Infantry Regiment

86th Infantry Brigade

1st Light Infantry Battalion
3rd Light Infantry Battalion
10th Light Infantry Battalion
31st Light Infantry Battalion

6th Squadron, 4th Light Horse Regiment
12th Field Artillery Regiment
Company 21/2, 11th Engineer Regiment

== Order of Battle — Second-line Units ==
=== Formations at the disposal of the Chief of the General Staff ===
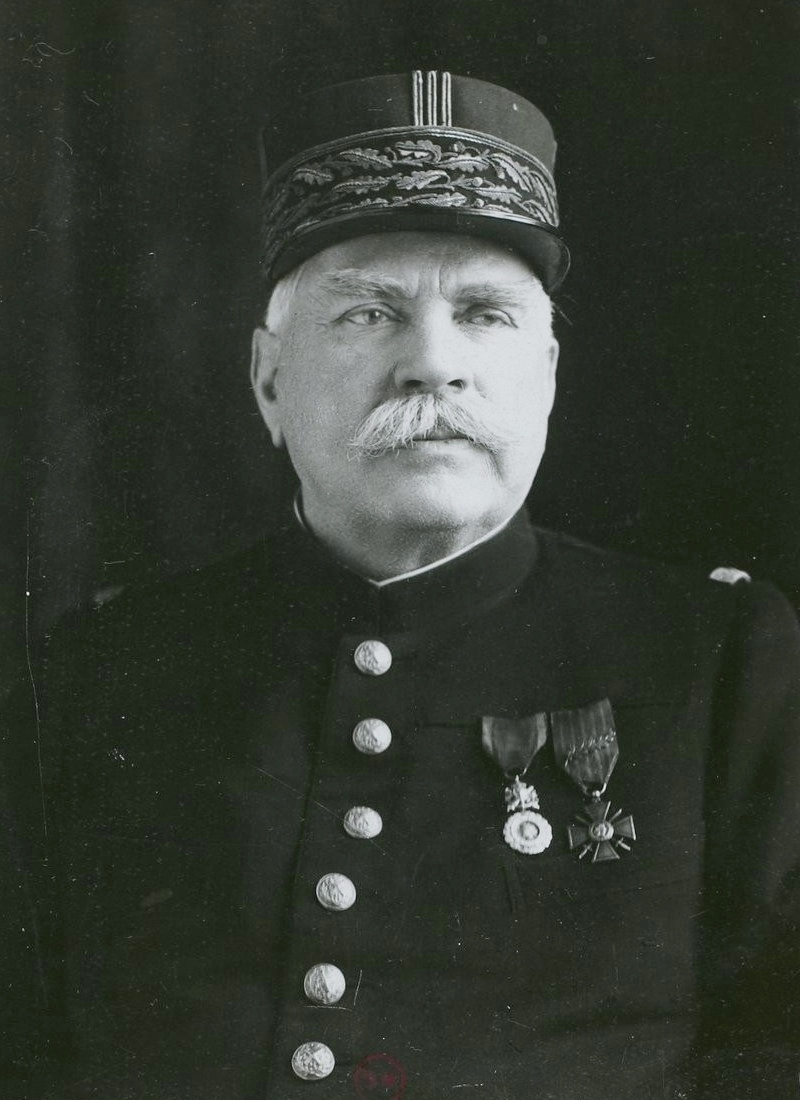
Joseph Joffre

In addition to the five field armies, the Chief of the General Staff, General Joseph Joffre, had several large formations at his disposal on other fronts, or as a reserve.

==== Sordet Cavalry Corps ====
Commander: André Sordet

1st Cavalry Division
Commander: Buisson

2nd Cuirassier Brigade

1st Cuirassier Regiment
2nd Cuirassier Regiment

5th Dragoon Brigade

6th Dragoon Regiment
23rd Dragoon Regiment

11th Dragoon Brigade

27th Dragoon Regiment
32nd Dragoon Regiment

1st Cyclist Group, 26th Light Infantry Battalion
4th Group, 13th Field Artillery Regiment
Cyclist Engineers, 1st Engineer Regiment

3rd Cavalry Division
Commander: Dor de Lastours

4th Cuirassier Brigade

4th Cuirassier Regiment
9th Cuirassier Regiment

13th Dragoon Brigade

5th Dragoon Regiment
21st Dragoon Regiment

3rd Light Cavalry Brigade

3rd Hussar Regiment
8th Hussar Regiment

3rd Cyclist Group, 18th Light Infantry Battalion
4th Group, 42nd Field Artillery Regiment
Cyclist Engineers, 3rd Engineer Regiment

5th Cavalry Division
Commander: Bridoux

3rd Dragoon Brigade

16th Dragoon Regiment
22nd Dragoon Regiment

7th Dragoon Brigade

9th Dragoon Regiment
29th Dragoon Regiment

5th Light Cavalry Brigade

5th Light Horse Regiment
15th Light Horse Regiment

5th Cyclist Group, 29th Light Infantry Battalion
4th Group, 61st Field Artillery Regiment
Cyclist Engineers, 9th Engineer Regiment

==== 1st Group of Reserve Divisions ====
Commander: Louis Archinard

58th Reserve Infantry Division
Commander: César Besset

115th Infantry Brigade

229th Infantry Regiment (reserve)
256th Infantry Regiment (reserve)
334th Infantry Regiment (reserve)

116th Infantry Brigade

213th Infantry Regiment (reserve)
285th Infantry Regiment (reserve)
295th Infantry Regiment (reserve)

5th & 6th Squadrons, 26th Dragoon Regiment
17th Field Artillery Regiment (one group)
29th Field Artillery Regiment (one group)
42nd Field Artillery Regiment (one group)
Companies 13/2, 19/2, and 24/2, 3rd Engineer Regiment

63rd Reserve Infantry Division
Commander: Gustave Lombard

125th Infantry Brigade

216th Infantry Regiment (reserve)
238th Infantry Regiment (reserve)
298th Infantry Regiment (reserve)

126th Infantry Brigade

292nd Infantry Regiment (reserve)
305th Infantry Regiment (reserve)
321st Infantry Regiment (reserve)

5th & 6th Squadrons, 14th Dragoon Regiment
16th Field Artillery Regiment (one group)
36th Field Artillery Regiment (one group)
53rd Field Artillery Regiment (one group)
Companies 13/13, 19/13, and 24/13, 4th Engineer Regiment

66th Reserve Infantry Division
Commander: Voirhaye

131st Infantry Brigade

280th Infantry Regiment (reserve)
281st Infantry Regiment (reserve)
296th Infantry Regiment (reserve)

132nd Infantry Brigade

215th Infantry Regiment (reserve)
253rd Infantry Regiment (reserve)
343rd Infantry Regiment (reserve)

5th & 6th Squadrons, 19th Dragoon Regiment
3rd Field Artillery Regiment (one group)
9th Field Artillery Regiment (one group)
56th Field Artillery Regiment (one group)
Companies 13/16, 19/16, and 24/16, 2nd Engineer Regiment

==== 4th Group of Reserve Divisions ====
Commander: Mardochée Valabrègue

51st Reserve Infantry Division
Commander: René Boutegourd

101st Infantry Brigade

233rd Infantry Regiment (reserve)
243rd Infantry Regiment (reserve)
327th Infantry Regiment (reserve)

102nd Infantry Brigade

208th Infantry Regiment (reserve)
273rd Infantry Regiment (reserve)
310th Infantry Regiment (reserve)

5th & 6th Squadrons, 4th Cuirassier Regiment
15th Field Artillery Regiment (one group)
27th Field Artillery Regiment (one group)
41st Field Artillery Regiment (one group)
Companies 13/1 and 24/1, 3rd Engineer Regiment
Company 20/22, 1st Engineer Regiment

53rd Reserve Infantry Division
Commander: Louis Loyzeau de Grandmaison

105th Infantry Brigade

205th Infantry Regiment (reserve)
236th Infantry Regiment (reserve)
319th Infantry Regiment (reserve)

106th Infantry Brigade

224th Infantry Regiment (reserve)
226th Infantry Regiment (reserve)
329th Infantry Regiment (reserve)

5th & 6th Squadrons, 27th Dragoon Regiment
11th Field Artillery Regiment (one group)
22nd Field Artillery Regiment (one group)
43rd Field Artillery Regiment (one group)
Companies 13/3, 19/3, and 24/3, 3rd Engineer Regiment

69th Reserve Infantry Division
Commander: Pierre Berdoulat

137th Infantry Brigade

287th Infantry Regiment (reserve)
306th Infantry Regiment (reserve)
332nd Infantry Regiment (reserve)

138th Infantry Brigade

251st Infantry Regiment (reserve)
254th Infantry Regiment (reserve)
267th Infantry Regiment (reserve)

5th & 6th Squadrons, 5th Dragoon Regiment
46th Field Artillery Regiment (one group)
28th Field Artillery Regiment (one group)
44th Field Artillery Regiment (one battery)
29th Field Artillery Regiment (one battery)
50th Field Artillery Regiment (one battery)
Companies 13/22, 19/22, and 22/22, 1st Engineer Regiment

==== Army of Africa ====
The Army of Africa (corresponding to the 19th Military Region) represents the four divisions raised in Africa and sent to metropolitan France.

37th Infantry Division
Commander: Louis Comby

73rd Infantry Brigade

2nd Zouaves Marching Regiment (3 battalions)
2nd Tirailleurs Marching Regiment (2 battalions)
5th Tirailleurs Marching Regiment (1 battalion)
6th Tirailleurs Marching Regiment (2 battalions)

74th Infantry Brigade

3rd Zouaves Marching Regiment (3 battalions)
3rd Tirailleurs Marching Regiment (3 battalions)
7th Tirailleurs Marching Regiment (1 battalion)

4th Squadron, 6th African Light Horse Regiment
1st, 2nd, and 3rd African Artillery Groups
Companies 8/17 and 8/22, 4th Engineer Regiment
Company 19/1, 19th Engineer Battalion
Transmission Detachment, 8th Engineer Regiment

38th Infantry Division
Commander: Jean-Marie Brulard

75th Infantry Brigade

1st Zouaves Marching Regiment (3 battalions)
1st Tirailleurs Marching Regiment (1 battalion)
9th Tirailleurs Marching Regiment (2 battalions)

76th Infantry Brigade

4th Zouaves Marching Regiment (4 battalions)
4th Tirailleurs Marching Regiment (2 battalions)
8th Tirailleurs Marching Regiment (2 battalions)

4th Squadron, 5th African Light Horse Regiment
32nd Field Artillery Regiment (3 groups)
Company 19/2, 19th Engineer Battalion
Company 1/25, 3rd Engineer Regiment

Moroccan Division
Commander: Hubert Lyautey

1st Moroccan Brigade

1st Colonial Marching Regiment
1st Zouaves Marching Regiment

2nd Infantry Brigade

5th East Moroccan Tirailleurs Regiment
2nd West Moroccan Tirailleurs Regiment

9th Light Horse Regiment (2 squadrons)
8th African Artillery Group (1 battery)
9th African Artillery Group (1 battery)
Moroccan Colonial Artillery Group (2 battery)
4th African Artillery Group (2 batteries)
Company 19/2, 2nd Engineer Regiment

45th Infantry Division
Commander: Antoine Drude

89th Infantry Brigade

1st Zouaves Marching Regiment (2 battalions)
4th Zouaves Marching Regiment (1 battalion)
3rd Zouaves Marching Regiment (3 battalions)

90th Infantry Brigade

2nd Zouaves Marching Regiment (3 battalions)
1st Algerian Tirailleurs Marching Regiment (1 battalion)
2nd Algerian Tirailleurs Marching Regiment (1 battalion)
8th Algerian Tirailleurs Marching Regiment (1 battalion)

1st Regiment, African Light Horse (two squadrons)
2nd Regiment, African Light Horse (two squadrons)
5th Battery, 3rd African Artillery Group
1st Battery, 1st African Artillery Group
2nd Battery, 2nd African Artillery Group
Company 17/1, Moroccan Engineer Regiment

==== North-East Mobile Defence ====
Four reserve divisions were assigned to provide a mobile reserve in the defence of the fortresses of Verdun, Toul, Épinal and Belfort.

57th Reserve Infantry Division
Commander: Bernard

113th Infantry Brigade

235th Infantry Regiment (reserve)
242nd Infantry Regiment (reserve)
260th Infantry Regiment (reserve)

114th Infantry Brigade

244th Infantry Regiment (reserve)
371st Infantry Regiment (reserve)
372nd Infantry Regiment (reserve)

41st Light Infantry Battalion
11th Dragoon Regiment (one squadron)
13th Dragoon Regiment (one squadron)
5th Field Artillery Regiment (two groups)
47th Field Artillery Regiment (one group)
Companies 1/22 and 21/22, 1st Engineer Regiment

71st Reserve Infantry Division
Commander: Joseph Kaufmant

141st Infantry Brigade

349th Infantry Regiment (reserve)
358th Infantry Regiment (reserve)
370th Infantry Regiment (reserve)

142nd Infantry Brigade

217th Infantry Regiment (reserve)
221st Infantry Regiment (reserve)
309th Infantry Regiment (reserve)

5th and 6th Squadrons, 12th Hussar Regiment
4th Field Artillery Regiment (one group)
62nd Field Artillery Regiment (two groups)
Companies 1/22 and 21/22, 22nd Engineer Battalion

72nd Reserve Infantry Division
Commander: Jules Heymann

143rd Infantry Brigade

351st Infantry Regiment (reserve)
362nd Infantry Regiment (reserve)

144th Infantry Brigade

364th Infantry Regiment (reserve)
365th Infantry Regiment (reserve)
366th Infantry Regiment (reserve)

2nd Hussar Regiment (one squadron)
4th Hussar Regiment (one squadron)
61st Field Artillery Regiment (one group)
59th Field Artillery Regiment (one group)
11th Field Artillery Regiment (one battery)
41st Field Artillery Regiment (one battery)
45th Field Artillery Regiment (one battery)
Companies 1/25 and 21/25, 25th Engineer Battalion

73rd Reserve Infantry Division
Commander: Marie Joseph Châtelain

145th Infantry Brigade

346th Infantry Regiment (reserve)
353rd Infantry Regiment (reserve)
356th Infantry Regiment (reserve)

146th Infantry Brigade

367th Infantry Regiment (reserve)
368th Infantry Regiment (reserve)
369th Infantry Regiment (reserve)

4th Dragoon Regiment (one squadron)
12th Dragoon Regiment (one squadron)
12th Field Artillery Regiment (one group)
39th Field Artillery Regiment (one group)
37th Field Artillery Regiment (one battery)
49th Field Artillery Regiment (one battery)
57th Field Artillery Regiment (one battery)
Companies 1/26, 3/26, and 21/26, 26th Engineer Battalion

==== Army of the Alps ====
Commander: Albert d'Amade

The Army of the Alps was formed from units mobilised in the 14th (Lyon) and 15th (Marseille) military regions to defend the border with Italy, who was a member of the Triple Alliance with Germany and Austria-Hungary.

44th Infantry Division
Commander: Soyer

88th Infantry Brigade

97th Infantry Regiment
159th Infantry Regiment

89th Infantry Brigade

157th Infantry Regiment
163rd Infantry Regiment

4th Squadron, 4th African Horse Regiment
6th Field Artillery Regiment (two batteries)
9th Field Artillery Regiment (one battery)
38th Field Artillery Regiment (two batteries)
53rd Field Artillery Regiment (one battery)
57th Field Artillery Regiment (one battery)
58th Field Artillery Regiment (one battery)
Companies 14/13, 14/16, and 14/22, 4th Engineer Regiment

64th Reserve Infantry Division
Commander: Hollender

127th Infantry Brigade

275th Infantry Regiment (reserve)
340th Infantry Regiment (reserve)
52nd Mountain Infantry Battalion
68th Mountain Infantry Battalion
70th Mountain Infantry Battalion

128th Infantry Brigade

252nd Infantry Regiment (reserve)
286th Infantry Regiment (reserve)
339th Infantry Regiment (reserve)

13th Light Horse Regiment (two squadrons)
1st Mountain Artillery Regiment (two groups)
2nd Mountain Artillery Regiment (one group)
Company 14/8, 8th Engineer Battalion

65th Reserve Infantry Division
Commander: Brice Adrien Bizot

129th Infantry Brigade

311th Infantry Regiment (reserve)
312th Infantry Regiment (reserve)
46th Mountain Infantry Battalion
64th Mountain Infantry Battalion
67th Mountain Infantry Battalion

130th Infantry Brigade

203rd Infantry Regiment (reserve)
341st Infantry Regiment (reserve)
47th Mountain Infantry Battalion
63rd Mountain Infantry Battalion

11th Hussar Regiment (two squadrons)
55th Field Artillery Regiment (one group)
2nd Mountain Artillery Regiment (two groups)
Companies 11/15 and 24/15, 15th Engineer Battalion

74th Reserve Infantry Division
Commander: Bigot

147th Infantry Brigade

222nd Infantry Regiment (reserve)
299th Infantry Regiment (reserve)
53rd Mountain Infantry Battalion
54th Mountain Infantry Battalion

148th Infantry Brigade

223rd Infantry Regiment (reserve)
230th Infantry Regiment (reserve)
333rd Infantry Regiment (reserve)
51st Mountain Infantry Battalion
62nd Mountain Infantry Battalion

2nd Dragoon Regiment (two squadrons)
54th Field Artillery Regiment (one group)
1st Mountain Artillery Regiment (two groups (2+3 batteries))
Company 14/13, 13th Engineer Battalion

75th Reserve Infantry Division
Commander: Henri Vimard

149th Infantry Brigade

240th Infantry Regiment (reserve)
258th Infantry Regiment (reserve)

150th Infantry Brigade

255th Infantry Regiment (reserve)
261st Infantry Regiment (reserve)

13th Light Horse Regiment (two squadrons)
19th Field Artillery Regiment (one group)
38th Field Artillery Regiment (one group)
2nd Mountain Artillery Regiment (one group)
Company 15/12, 7th Engineer Regiment

91st Territorial Infantry Division
Commander: Paul Lacroisade

181st Territorial Infantry Brigade

129th Territorial Infantry Regiment
130th Territorial Infantry Regiment

182nd Territorial Infantry Brigade

132nd Territorial Infantry Regiment
134th Territorial Infantry Regiment
135th Territorial Infantry Regiment

10th Dragoon Regiment (two squadrons)
57th Field Artillery Regiment (two groups)
Company 17/1T, 2nd Engineer Regiment

=== Formations at the disposal of the Minister of War ===
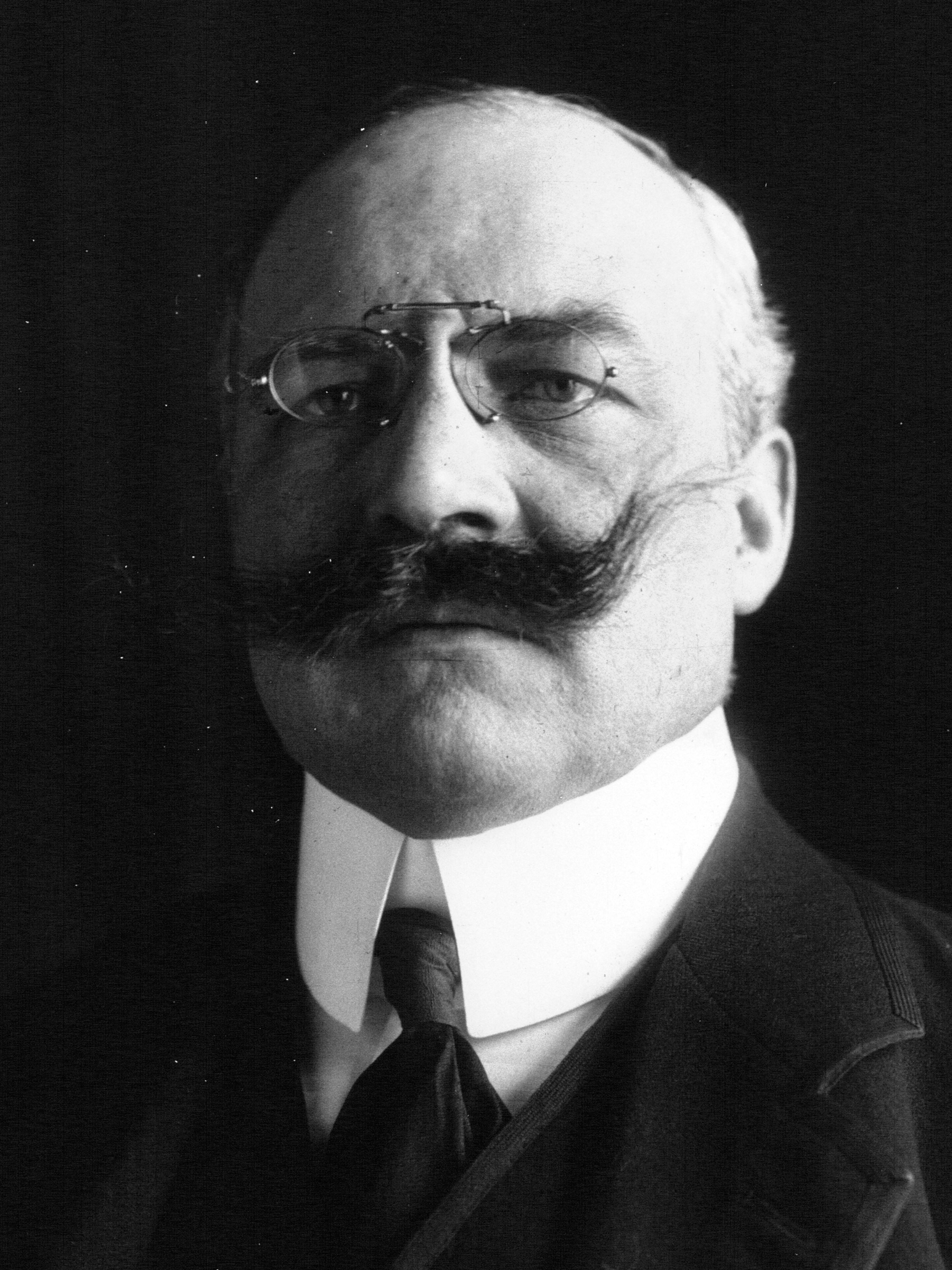
Adolphe Messimy

Plan XVII provided for several large units to be at the disposal of the Minister of War, Adolphe Messimy. These units were gradually transferred to the Chief of the General Staff, General Joseph Joffre.

67th Reserve Infantry Division
Commander: Henry Marabail

133rd Infantry Brigade

211th Infantry Regiment (reserve)
214th Infantry Regiment (reserve)
220th Infantry Regiment (reserve)

134th Infantry Brigade

259th Infantry Regiment (reserve)
283rd Infantry Regiment (reserve)
288th Infantry Regiment (reserve)

10th Dragoon Regiment (two squadrons)
18th Field Artillery Regiment (one group)
23rd Field Artillery Regiment (one group)
57th Field Artillery Regiment (one group)
Companies 13/16, 19/16, and 24/16, 2nd Engineer Regiment

==== Military Governor of Paris ====
Commander: Victor-Constant Michel

61st Reserve Infantry Division
Commander: Paul Virvaire

121st Infantry Brigade

264th Infantry Regiment (reserve)
265th Infantry Regiment (reserve)
316th Infantry Regiment (reserve)

122nd Infantry Brigade

318th Infantry Regiment (reserve)
219th Infantry Regiment (reserve)
262nd Infantry Regiment (reserve)

2nd Light Horse Regiment (two squadrons)
28th Field Artillery Regiment (one group)
35th Field Artillery Regiment (one group)
51st Field Artillery Regiment (one group)
Companies 11/13, 11/19 and 11/24, 5th Engineer Regiment

62nd Reserve Infantry Division
Commander: Marie François Caneval

123rd Infantry Brigade

263rd Infantry Regiment (reserve)
278th Infantry Regiment (reserve)
338th Infantry Regiment (reserve)

124th Infantry Brigade

250th Infantry Regiment (reserve)
307th Infantry Regiment (reserve)
308th Infantry Regiment (reserve)

20th Dragoon Regiment (two squadrons)
21st Field Artillery Regiment (one group)
34th Field Artillery Regiment (one group)
52nd Field Artillery Regiment (one group)
Companies 13/12, 19/12, and 24/12, 6th Engineer Regiment

83rd Territorial Infantry Division
Commander: Charles Groth

165th Territorial Infantry Brigade

29th Territorial Infantry Regiment
30th Territorial Infantry Regiment

166th Territorial Infantry Brigade

31st Territorial Infantry Regiment
32nd Territorial Infantry Regiment

1st Light Horse Regiment (two squadrons)
45th Field Artillery Regiment (one group)

84th Territorial Infantry Division
Commander: Henri de Ferron

167th Territorial Infantry Brigade

25th Territorial Infantry Regiment
26th Territorial Infantry Regiment

168th Territorial Infantry Brigade

27th Territorial Infantry Regiment
28th Territorial Infantry Regiment

14th Hussar Regiment (two squadrons)
44th Field Artillery Regiment (two groups)
Company 4/1T, 4th Engineer Regiment

85th Territorial Infantry Division
Commander: Tell Aristide Frédéric Antoine Chapel

169th Territorial Infantry Brigade

65th Territorial Infantry Regiment
66th Territorial Infantry Regiment

170th Territorial Infantry Brigade

67th Territorial Infantry Regiment
68th Territorial Infantry Regiment

7th Hussar Regiment (two squadrons)
32nd Field Artillery Regiment (one group)
Company 4/14T and 5/2T, 1st Engineer Regiment

86th Territorial Infantry Division
Commander: Raymond Mayniel

171st Territorial Infantry Brigade

69th Territorial Infantry Regiment
70th Territorial Infantry Regiment

172nd Territorial Infantry Brigade

71st Territorial Infantry Regiment
72nd Territorial Infantry Regiment

25th Dragoon Regiment (two squadrons)
49th Field Artillery Regiment (one group)

89th Territorial Infantry Division
Commander: Louis Penaud

177th Territorial Infantry Brigade

89th Territorial Infantry Regiment
90th Territorial Infantry Regiment

178th Territorial Infantry Brigade

93rd Territorial Infantry Regiment
94th Territorial Infantry Regiment

21st Light Horse Regiment (two squadrons)
52nd Field Artillery Regiment (one group)

==== Isolated Divisions ====
Six territorial infantry divisions were initially used to provide defence of the north-east coast from possible German naval landing, and to guard the Spanish border. As these threats receded, these divisions were gradually moved towards the frontline.

81st Territorial Infantry Division
Commander: Louis Marcot

161st Territorial Infantry Brigade

11th Territorial Infantry Regiment
12th Territorial Infantry Regiment

162nd Territorial Infantry Brigade

14th Territorial Infantry Regiment
16th Territorial Infantry Regiment

9th Cuirassier Regiment
29th Field Artillery Regiment (two groups)
Company 2/1T, 1st Engineer Regiment

82nd Territorial Infantry Division
Commander: Charles Vigy

163rd Territorial Infantry Brigade

17th Territorial Infantry Regiment
18th Territorial Infantry Regiment

164th Territorial Infantry Brigade

21st Territorial Infantry Regiment
22nd Territorial Infantry Regiment

7th Light Horse Regiment (two squadrons)
11th Field Artillery Regiment (two groups)
Company 3/1T, 3rd Engineer Regiment

87th Territorial Infantry Division
Commander: Roy

173rd Territorial Infantry Brigade

73rd Territorial Infantry Regiment
74th Territorial Infantry Regiment

174th Territorial Infantry Brigade

76th Territorial Infantry Regiment
79th Territorial Infantry Regiment
80th Territorial Infantry Regiment

185th Territorial Infantry Brigade

75th Territorial Infantry Regiment
78th Territorial Infantry Regiment

24th Dragoon Regiment (two squadrons)
49th Field Artillery Regiment (one group)
50th Field Artillery Regiment (one group)
Company 10/3T, 6th Engineer Regiment

88th Territorial Infantry Division
Commander: Dennery

175th Territorial Infantry Brigade

81st Territorial Infantry Regiment
82nd Territorial Infantry Regiment

176th Territorial Infantry Brigade

83rd Territorial Infantry Regiment
84th Territorial Infantry Regiment

3rd Dragoon Regiment (two squadrons)
20th Field Artillery Regiment (one group)
28th Field Artillery Regiment (one group)
Company 11/3T, 6th Engineer Regiment

90th Territorial Infantry Division
Commander: Jules Bunoust

179th Territorial Infantry Brigade

125th Territorial Infantry Regiment
126th Territorial Infantry Regiment

180th Territorial Infantry Brigade

127th Territorial Infantry Regiment
128th Territorial Infantry Regiment

1st Hussar Regiment (two squadrons)
9th Field Artillery Regiment (one group)
one company, 13th Territorial Engineer Battalion

92nd Territorial Infantry Division
Commander: Henri Eugène Calvel

183rd Territorial Infantry Brigade

141st Territorial Infantry Regiment
142nd Territorial Infantry Regiment

184th Territorial Infantry Brigade

143rd Territorial Infantry Regiment
144th Territorial Infantry Regiment

10th Hussar Regiment (two squadrons)
14th Field Artillery Regiment (two groups)
Company 18/1T, 2nd Engineer Regiment

==== Territorial Units ====
In addition to the territorial infantry divisions, many independent regiments and other units were formed.

===== Infantry =====
1st Military Region

1st Territorial Infantry Regiment
2nd Territorial Infantry Regiment
3rd Territorial Infantry Regiment
4th Territorial Infantry Regiment
5th Territorial Infantry Regiment
6th Territorial Infantry Regiment
7th Territorial Infantry Regiment
8th Territorial Infantry Regiment

2nd Military Region

9th Territorial Infantry Regiment
10th Territorial Infantry Regiment
13th Territorial Infantry Regiment
15th Territorial Infantry Regiment

3rd Military Region

19th Territorial Infantry Regiment
20th Territorial Infantry Regiment
23rd Territorial Infantry Regiment
24th Territorial Infantry Regiment

4th Military Region

33rd Territorial Infantry Regiment
34th Territorial Infantry Regiment
35th Territorial Infantry Regiment
36th Territorial Infantry Regiment

5th Military Region

37th Territorial Infantry Regiment
38th Territorial Infantry Regiment
39th Territorial Infantry Regiment
40th Territorial Infantry Regiment

6th Military Region

41st Territorial Infantry Regiment
42nd Territorial Infantry Regiment
43rd Territorial Infantry Regiment
44th Territorial Infantry Regiment
45th Territorial Infantry Regiment
46th Territorial Infantry Regiment
47th Territorial Infantry Regiment
48th Territorial Infantry Regiment
49th Territorial Infantry Regiment
50th Territorial Infantry Regiment
51st Territorial Infantry Regiment
52nd Territorial Infantry Regiment

7th Military Region

53rd Territorial Infantry Regiment
54th Territorial Infantry Regiment
55th Territorial Infantry Regiment
56th Territorial Infantry Regiment
57th Territorial Infantry Regiment

8th Military Region

58th Territorial Infantry Regiment
59th Territorial Infantry Regiment
60th Territorial Infantry Regiment
61st Territorial Infantry Regiment
62nd Territorial Infantry Regiment
63rd Territorial Infantry Regiment
64th Territorial Infantry Regiment

9th Military Region

All regiments were assigned to territorial infantry divisions

10th Military Region

77th Territorial Infantry Regiment
85th Territorial Infantry Regiment
86th Territorial Infantry Regiment
87th Territorial Infantry Regiment
88th Territorial Infantry Regiment

11th Military Region

All regiments were assigned to territorial infantry divisions

12th Military Region

91st Territorial Infantry Regiment
92nd Territorial Infantry Regiment
95th Territorial Infantry Regiment
96th Territorial Infantry Regiment

13th Military Region

97th Territorial Infantry Regiment
98th Territorial Infantry Regiment
99th Territorial Infantry Regiment
100th Territorial Infantry Regiment
101st Territorial Infantry Regiment
102nd Territorial Infantry Regiment
103rd Territorial Infantry Regiment
104th Territorial Infantry Regiment

14th Military Region

105th Territorial Infantry Regiment
106th Territorial Infantry Regiment
107th Territorial Infantry Regiment
108th Territorial Infantry Regiment
109th Territorial Infantry Regiment
110th Territorial Infantry Regiment
111th Territorial Infantry Regiment
112th Territorial Infantry Regiment

15th Military Region

113th Territorial Infantry Regiment
114th Territorial Infantry Regiment
115th Territorial Infantry Regiment
116th Territorial Infantry Regiment
117th Territorial Infantry Regiment
118th Territorial Infantry Regiment
119th Territorial Infantry Regiment
120th Territorial Infantry Regiment

16th Military Region

121st Territorial Infantry Regiment
122nd Territorial Infantry Regiment
123rd Territorial Infantry Regiment
124th Territorial Infantry Regiment

17th Military Region

131st Territorial Infantry Regiment
133rd Territorial Infantry Regiment
136th Territorial Infantry Regiment

18th Military Region

137th Territorial Infantry Regiment
138th Territorial Infantry Regiment
139th Territorial Infantry Regiment
140th Territorial Infantry Regiment

===== Cavalry =====
Territorial Dragoon Squadron of the 1st Region
Territorial Light Cavalry Squadron of the 1st Region
Territorial Dragoon Squadron of the 2nd Region
Territorial Light Cavalry Squadron of the 2nd Region
Territorial Dragoon Squadron of the 3rd Region
Territorial Light Cavalry Squadron of the 3rd Region
Territorial Dragoon Squadron of the 4th Region
Territorial Light Cavalry Squadron of the 4th Region
Territorial Dragoon Squadron of the 5th Region
Territorial Light Cavalry Squadron of the 5th Region
Territorial Light Cavalry Squadron of the 6th Region
Territorial Dragoon Squadron of the 7th Region
Territorial Light Cavalry Squadron of the 7th Region
Territorial Dragoon Squadron of the 8th Region
Territorial Light Cavalry Squadron of the 8th Region
Territorial Dragoon Squadron of the 9th Region
Territorial Light Cavalry Squadron of the 9th Region
Territorial Dragoon Squadron of the 10th Region
Territorial Light Cavalry Squadron of the 10th Region
Territorial Dragoon Squadron of the 11th Region
Territorial Light Cavalry Squadron of the 11th Region
Territorial Dragoon Squadron of the 12th Region
Territorial Light Cavalry Squadron of the 12th Region
Territorial Dragoon Squadron of the 13th Region
Territorial Light Cavalry Squadron of the 13th Region
Territorial Dragoon Squadron of the 14th Region
Territorial Light Cavalry Squadron of the 14th Region
Territorial Dragoon Squadron of the 15th Region
Territorial Light Cavalry Squadron of the 15th Region
Territorial Dragoon Squadron of the 16th Region
Territorial Light Cavalry Squadron of the 16th Region
Territorial Dragoon Squadron of the 17th Region
Territorial Light Cavalry Squadron of the 17th Region
Territorial Dragoon Squadron of the 18th Region
Territorial Light Cavalry Squadron of the 18th Region
Territorial Dragoon Squadron of the 20th Region

===== Artillery =====
Territorial Group, 1st Foot Artillery Regiment
Territorial Group, 2nd Foot Artillery Regiment
Territorial Group, 3rd Foot Artillery Regiment
Territorial Group, 4th Foot Artillery Regiment
Territorial Group, 5th Foot Artillery Regiment
Territorial Group, 6th Foot Artillery Regiment
Territorial Group, 7th Foot Artillery Regiment
Territorial Group, 8th Foot Artillery Regiment
Territorial Group, 9th Foot Artillery Regiment
Territorial Group, 10th Foot Artillery Regiment
Territorial Battalion, 10th Foot Artillery Regiment
two Territorial Groups, 11th Foot Artillery Regiment
Territorial Group, 6th African Foot Artillery Group
Territorial Group, 1st Field Artillery Regiment
Territorial Group, 2nd Field Artillery Regiment
Territorial Group, 3rd Field Artillery Regiment
Territorial Group, 4th Field Artillery Regiment
Territorial Group, 5th Field Artillery Regiment
Territorial Group, 6th Field Artillery Regiment
Territorial Group, 7th Field Artillery Regiment
Territorial Group, 8th Field Artillery Regiment
Territorial Group, 9th Field Artillery Regiment
Territorial Group, 10th Field Artillery Regiment
Territorial Group, 11th Field Artillery Regiment
Territorial Group, 12th Field Artillery Regiment
Territorial Group, 13th Field Artillery Regiment
Territorial Group, 14th Field Artillery Regiment
Territorial Group, 15th Field Artillery Regiment
Territorial Group, 16th Field Artillery Regiment
Territorial Group, 17th Field Artillery Regiment
Territorial Group, 18th Field Artillery Regiment
Territorial Group, 19th Field Artillery Regiment
Territorial Group, 20th Field Artillery Regiment
Territorial Group, 21st Field Artillery Regiment
Territorial Group, 22nd Field Artillery Regiment
Territorial Group, 23rd Field Artillery Regiment
Territorial Group, 24th Field Artillery Regiment
Territorial Group, 25th Field Artillery Regiment
Territorial Group, 26th Field Artillery Regiment
Territorial Group, 27th Field Artillery Regiment
Territorial Group, 28th Field Artillery Regiment
Territorial Group, 29th Field Artillery Regiment
Territorial Group, 30th Field Artillery Regiment
Territorial Group, 31st Field Artillery Regiment
Territorial Group, 32nd Field Artillery Regiment
Territorial Group, 33rd Field Artillery Regiment
Territorial Group, 34th Field Artillery Regiment
Territorial Group, 35th Field Artillery Regiment
Territorial Group, 36th Field Artillery Regiment
Territorial Group, 37th Field Artillery Regiment
Territorial Group, 38th Field Artillery Regiment
Territorial Group, 39th Field Artillery Regiment
Territorial Group, 40th Field Artillery Regiment
Territorial Group, 41st Field Artillery Regiment
Territorial Group, 42nd Field Artillery Regiment
Territorial Group, 43rd Field Artillery Regiment
Territorial Group, 44th Field Artillery Regiment
Territorial Group, 45th Field Artillery Regiment
Territorial Group, 46th Field Artillery Regiment
Territorial Group, 47th Field Artillery Regiment
Territorial Group, 48th Field Artillery Regiment
Territorial Group, 49th Field Artillery Regiment
Territorial Group, 50th Field Artillery Regiment
Territorial Group, 51st Field Artillery Regiment
Territorial Group, 52nd Field Artillery Regiment
Territorial Group, 53rd Field Artillery Regiment
Territorial Group, 54th Field Artillery Regiment
Territorial Group, 55th Field Artillery Regiment
Territorial Group, 56th Field Artillery Regiment
Territorial Group, 57th Field Artillery Regiment
Territorial Group, 58th Field Artillery Regiment
Territorial Group, 59th Field Artillery Regiment
Territorial Group, 1st Mountain Artillery Regiment
Territorial Group, 2nd Mountain Artillery Regiment
Static Cannon Battalion, Lille

===== Engineer =====
1st Territorial Engineer Battalion
2nd Territorial Engineer Battalion
3rd Territorial Engineer Battalion
4th Territorial Engineer Battalion
5th Territorial Engineer Battalion
6th Territorial Engineer Battalion
7th Territorial Engineer Battalion
8th Territorial Engineer Battalion
9th Territorial Engineer Battalion
10th Territorial Engineer Battalion
11th Territorial Engineer Battalion
12th Territorial Engineer Battalion
13th Territorial Engineer Battalion
14th Territorial Engineer Battalion
15th Territorial Engineer Battalion
16th Territorial Engineer Battalion
17th Territorial Engineer Battalion
18th Territorial Engineer Battalion
20th Territorial Engineer Battalion
21st Territorial Engineer Battalion

===== Logistics =====
1st Territorial Squadron, Military Baggage Train
2nd Territorial Squadron, Military Baggage Train
3rd Territorial Squadron, Military Baggage Train
4th Territorial Squadron, Military Baggage Train
5th Territorial Squadron, Military Baggage Train
6th Territorial Squadron, Military Baggage Train
7th Territorial Squadron, Military Baggage Train
8th Territorial Squadron, Military Baggage Train
9th Territorial Squadron, Military Baggage Train
10th Territorial Squadron, Military Baggage Train
11th Territorial Squadron, Military Baggage Train
12th Territorial Squadron, Military Baggage Train
13th Territorial Squadron, Military Baggage Train
14th Territorial Squadron, Military Baggage Train
15th Territorial Squadron, Military Baggage Train
16th Territorial Squadron, Military Baggage Train
17th Territorial Squadron, Military Baggage Train
18th Territorial Squadron, Military Baggage Train
19th Territorial Squadron, Military Baggage Train
20th Territorial Squadron, Military Baggage Train

===== Clerks and Workers =====
1st Territorial Squadron, Military Administration
2nd Territorial Squadron, Military Administration
3rd Territorial Squadron, Military Administration
4th Territorial Squadron, Military Administration
5th Territorial Squadron, Military Administration
6th Territorial Squadron, Military Administration
7th Territorial Squadron, Military Administration
8th Territorial Squadron, Military Administration
9th Territorial Squadron, Military Administration
10th Territorial Squadron, Military Administration
11th Territorial Squadron, Military Administration
12th Territorial Squadron, Military Administration
13th Territorial Squadron, Military Administration
14th Territorial Squadron, Military Administration
15th Territorial Squadron, Military Administration
16th Territorial Squadron, Military Administration
17th Territorial Squadron, Military Administration
18th Territorial Squadron, Military Administration
22nd Territorial Squadron, Military Administration
23rd Territorial Squadron, Military Administration

===== Military Nurses =====
1st Territorial Squadron, Military Nurses
2nd Territorial Squadron, Military Nurses
3rd Territorial Squadron, Military Nurses
4th Territorial Squadron, Military Nurses
5th Territorial Squadron, Military Nurses
6th Territorial Squadron, Military Nurses
7th Territorial Squadron, Military Nurses
8th Territorial Squadron, Military Nurses
9th Territorial Squadron, Military Nurses
10th Territorial Squadron, Military Nurses
11th Territorial Squadron, Military Nurses
12th Territorial Squadron, Military Nurses
13th Territorial Squadron, Military Nurses
14th Territorial Squadron, Military Nurses
15th Territorial Squadron, Military Nurses
15th Territorial Squadron, Military Nurses
16th Territorial Squadron, Military Nurses
17th Territorial Squadron, Military Nurses
18th Territorial Squadron, Military Nurses
23rd Territorial Squadron, Military Nurses

== See also ==
- Marching regiment
- Territorial Army (France)
- French Army in World War I
- British Expeditionary Force order of battle (1914)
- German Army order of battle (1914)
- Belgian Army order of battle (1914)
- Battle of the Frontiers
- Order of battle of the First Battle of the Marne
- French cavalry during World War I
- French artillery during World War I

== Bibliography ==
- Répartition et emplacement des troupes de l'armée française [Distribution and location of French army troops] (in French). Paris: Imprimerie nationale. 1 May 1914.
- Service historique de l'état-major des armées; Historical Service of the General Staff of the Armed Forces (1922–1934). Les Armées françaises dans la Grande guerre [The French Army during the Great War (bnf:41052951h)] (Eleven books subdivided into 30 volumes) (in French). Paris.
  - AFGG (1936). Les préliminaires, La bataille des frontières [The preliminaries, the Battle of the Frontiers] (in French). Vol. 1, 1.
  - AFGG (1923). Ordres de bataille des grandes unités : grands quartiers généraux, groupe d'armées, armées, corps d'armée [Orders of battle for major units: general headquarters, army groups, armies, army corps] (in French). Vol. 1, 10.
  - AFGG (1924). Ordres de bataille des grandes unités : divisions d'infanterie, divisions de cavalerie [Orders of battle for major units: infantry divisions, cavalry divisions] (in French). Vol. 2, 10.
