= Military reserve forces of France =

The military reserve forces of France are the military reserve force within the French Armed Forces.

== History ==
From the very moment Napoléon Bonaparte took power as First Consul in the coup of 18 Brumaire, he was feared by his rivals, and keenly supported by the army. They participated in the creation of a new constitution that forbade a Consul from leading an active army outside France. The violence of the coup d'état had already caused disquiet, and the consuls had access to an impressive Consular Guard.

Following the new constitution to the letter, Napoléon raised a reserve army (and thus not counting as an active army) at Dijon to support his war effort in Italy. This was the turning point of his Second Italian campaign.

From 1866, Napoleon III wanted to establish a military reserve comparable to the Prussian Landwehr. The army reserve was created by law on 27 July 1872 following the disbandment of the National Guard.

This law established a military service obligation of twenty years for French men as follows:

- five years in the active army;
- four years in the Army Reserve;
- five years in the Territorial Army;
- six years in the Territorial Army Reserve.

Not every man served five years as the duration of active service was drawn by lots, with some only serving one year whilst others served the full five years.

On 25 July 1889, military service was increased to twenty-five years; with three years in the active army, seven years in the Army Reserve, six years in the Territorial Army, and nine years in the Territorial Army Reserve. The law required members of the Army Reserve to participate in two exercises of four weeks each, and members of the Territorial Army to one exercise of two weeks.

On 21 March 1905, the drawing of lots was abolished. The increase in conscripts allowed service in the active army to be reduced to two years whilst still maintaining its strength. And members of the Territorial Army Reserve had to participate in one exercise of nine days.

On 7 Aug 1913, service in the active army was restored to three years, and the conscription age was lowered to 20. Military service was increased to twenty-eight years by extending service in the Army Reserve to eleven years.

On mobilisation in 1914, the active army was supplemented by:

1. the Army Reserve of men aged from 24 to 33, i.e. born between 1881 and 1890.
2. the Territorial Army of men aged from 34 to 39, i.e. born between 1875 and 1880.
3. the Territorial Army Reserve of men aged from 40 to 45, i.e. born between 1868 and 1874.

The Territorial Army Reserve was expanded to include men aged from 46 to 49, i.e. born between 1865 and 1868.

== Present organisation ==
On the suspension of obligatory national service and the professionalisation of its armies, France also modified the organisation of its military reserve in the same professionalising way. Law n°99-894 of 22 October 1999 (modified by law 2006-449 of 18 April 2006) set out the organisation of the military reserve and of the defence forces.

The military reserve was organised into two bodies :

- the réserve citoyenne (citizen reserve), group of volunteers actively getting to know the military world, undergoing training and maintaining the links between the armed forces and civil society. Citizen reservists have military status.
- the réserve opérationnelle (operational reserve), grouping together reservists with an ESR (engagement à servir la réserve, or "obligation to serve in the reserve") and former military officers with an availability obligation (who thus remain available for the armed forces). The reservists serving under an ESR serve as military officers for periods of 1 to 210 days per year; they are coming from all fields (former officers, old appelés du contingent (conscripts), civilians without a military past) and all the professional social categories.

These reservists serve in many branches of the forces - the air force, army, gendarmerie, navy, health service, supply corps, and DGA.

== The Reserve of the French Army ==
The Army operational reserve is about 60% headquarters/staff specialists and 40% sub-unit reservists (company, battery, squadron, drill).

Two types of reserve units are in service:

- The Unités d'Intervention de Réserve (UIR) (Intervention Reserve), specializing in national defense
- The Unités Spécialisées de Réserve (USR) (Specialist Reserve) for the Engineers, Logistics and NBC units of the Army. These units share the same missions as the active units within the regiment.

Training consists of:

- Reserve Initial Training ("La formation initiale du réserviste", FMIR) : 15 days
- Technical Aptitude Certificate ("Le certificat d'aptitude technique élémentaire", CATE) : 15 days
- Cadre training (FIE) : 1 month
- Reserve Officer Initial Training ("La formation initiale d'officier de réserve", FIOR) : 21 days
- Platoon Leader Training ("La formation de chef de section") : 21 days

Among the units expected to form reserve sub-units, circa 2014, were the 1st Infantry Regiment at Sarrebourg; the 35th Infantry Regiment at Belfort; the 92nd Infantry Regiment at Clermont-Ferrand; the 126th Infantry Regiment (Brive); 152nd Infantry Regiment (Colmar); fr:7e bataillon de chasseurs alpins (7e BCA) at Varces; 13e BCA at Barby; 16e BC at Bitche; 27e BCA; Annecy; 1er RTir; Epinal; 1er RCP at Pamiers; 501e RCC at Mourmelon Le Grand; 1er RCh at Thierville Sur Meuse; 4e RCh; Gap; 12e RC; Olivet; 4e RD; Carnoux En Provence; 1er RHP; Tarbes; 3e RH at Metz; and the 1st Spahi Regiment (1er RS) at Valence.
