= Obusier de 155 mm C modèle 1881 =

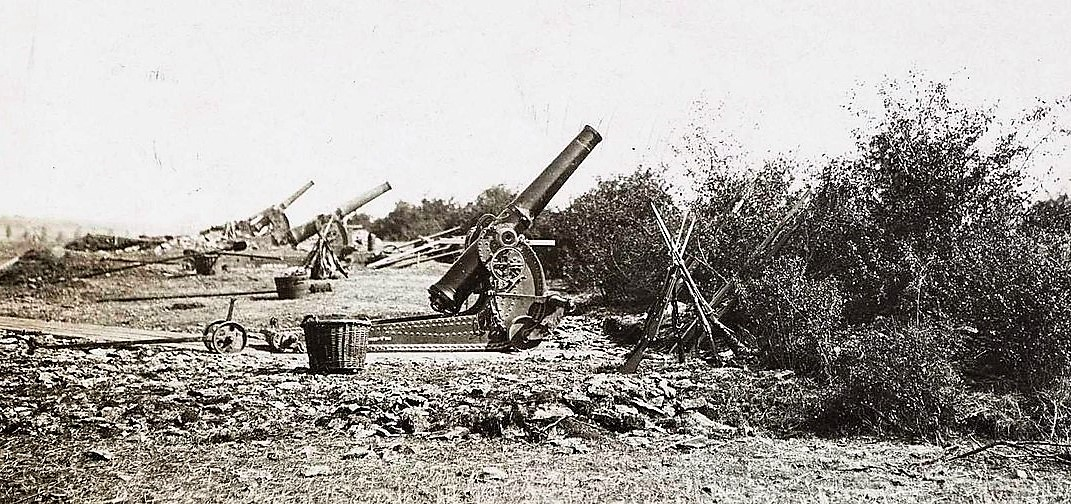
- A battery of mle 1881's near the Argonne forest in 1915.
- Type: Howitzer; Siege gun
- Place of origin: France

Service history
- In service: 1881–1918
- Wars: World War I

Production history
- Designer: Colonel Charles Ragon de Bange
- Designed: 1880
- Produced: 1881
- No. built: 240
- Variants: See variants

Specifications
- Mass: Travel: 2,490 kg (5,490 lb); Combat: 2,155 kg (4,751 lb)
- Length: 3.78 m (12 ft 5 in)
- Barrel length: 2.4 m (7 ft 10 in) L/15.5
- Shell: Separate loading bagged charges and projectiles
- Shell weight: 40–43.7 kg (88–96 lb)
- Caliber: 155 mm (6.1 in)
- Breech: de Bange
- Recoil: See variants
- Carriage: Box trail
- Elevation: -17° to +60°
- Traverse: See variants
- Rate of fire: 1 round every 2 minutes
- Muzzle velocity: 303 m/s (990 ft/s)
- Maximum firing range: 6.8 km (4.2 mi)

The Obusier de 155 mm C modèle 1881 - was a French howitzer designed by Colonel Charles Ragon de Bange and employed by the French army during the First World War.

== History ==
The Obusier de 155 mm C mle 1881 was one of a series of heavy artillery pieces designed by Colonel Charles Ragon de Bange. On 11 May 1874 three de Bange heavy cannons (120 mm, 155 mm, 240 mm) and two mortars (220 mm, 270 mm) were ordered by the French Army. The mle 1881 was advanced for its time due to being built completely of steel instead of a steel liner and cast iron reinforcing hoops of the previous Canon de 240 mm C mle 1870-87.

== Design ==
Unlike the earlier Canon de 155 mm L modèle 1877, the mle 1881 was designed for short range high angle fire instead of long-range low angle fire. The mle 1881 used a distinctive looking gooseneck shaped box trail, was a breech loaded howitzer with a steel barrel and a de Bange obturator which used separate loading bagged charges and projectiles. The mle 1881 was originally built without a recoil mechanism and in order to traverse the carriage needed to be levered into position before and after each shot limiting the rate of fire. For transport, the mle 1881 could be fitted with a set of removable wooden spoked wheels with steel rims at the front of the carriage. The tail of the carriage was then hooked to a limber and caisson for horse towing. Site preparation included creating a 5.3 m (17 ft) firing platform made of wooden beams which took 2.5 hours to build.

== First World War ==
Although the majority of combatants had heavy field artillery prior to the outbreak of the First World War, none had adequate numbers of heavy guns in service, nor had they foreseen the growing importance of heavy artillery once the Western Front stagnated and trench warfare set in. Fortresses, armories, coastal fortifications, and museums were scoured for heavy artillery and sent to the front. Suitable field and rail carriages were built for these guns in an effort to give their forces the heavy field artillery needed to overcome trenches and hardened concrete fortifications.

At the outbreak of the First World War, it is estimated there were 237 mle 1881's available. The mle 1881 was classified as a siege et de place (stationary siege gun) and was assigned to régiments d'artillerie à pied (fortress artillery regiments) for the defense of fortifications. Although designed to be a stationary howitzer for use in fortifications its light weight and removable wheels meant it was often used as a field howitzer. Although the mle 1881 was short ranged it had a reputation for accuracy and its high angle fire meant it could be fired from concealed positions to reduce crew exposure.

== Variants ==
- En Portee - An unknown number of mle 1881's were mounted on trucks to create mobile artillery pieces. These were mounted on a flatbed truck with the barrel over the cab of the truck.
- Tourelle de 155 C modèle 1908 - This consisted of mle 1881's installed in revolving iron domed turrets in concrete fortifications at Lucey and other French forts.
- Affût-truck Peigné-Canet mle 1897 - Was developed by Lieutenant Colonel Peigné and engineer Gustave Canet at the turn of the century. This conversion involved mounting the guns on rail wagons which ran on narrow-gauge 600 mm (1 ft 11 5/8 in) tracks at the forts of Verdun, Toul, Épinal, and Belfort. Each fortress was supposed to have twelve 155 C and eight 120 L guns on the same carriage. These allowed the guns to be quickly re-positioned to different parts of the fort and brought up ammunition and supplies. The guns were mounted on flatbed rail-cars with folding side panels that created a circular base when unfolded, they were also stabilized with four folding outriggers. The guns were mounted on articulated center pivot gun mounts which provided high angles of elevation, 360° of traverse and an integrated hydro-pneumatic recoil mechanism.
- Obusier de 155 mm C mle 1881/12 Filloux - A modification program in 1912 gave 108 mle 1881's a new wedge-shaped box trail carriage with a hydro-pneumatic recoil mechanism and limited traverse. The new carriage was designed by Colonel Louis Filloux and consisted of a U-shaped gun cradle which held the trunnioned barrel. When the gun fired the hydro-buffer slowed the recoil of the cradle which slid up a set of inclined rails on the firing platform and then returned to position by the combined action of the buffers and gravity. The new carriage improved the rate of fire and decreased the amount of setup time due to better weight distribution and less site preparation. The front of the carriage also pivoted to allow 24° of traverse.
- Obusier de 155 mm C mle 1890 Baquet - This field howitzer used the same barrel as the mle 1881 on a new box trail carriage that had two wooden spoked wheels with steel rims and was designed to be light enough to be horse-drawn in one piece. The carriage was split into two parts, a stationary lower part which supported the weapon and a sliding upper part which supported the gun barrel. The upper part was L-shaped and the gun barrel was inserted into a cradle with a hydro-pneumatic recoil system below the barrel which connected to the lower portion of the carriage. The cradle and carriage had a hollow center section to allow for high angles of elevation, while the front of the cradle pivoted to allow limited traverse. When the gun fired the cradle recoiled backward, while the lower part stayed anchored. This carriage and recoil system was also used by the less powerful Obusier de 120 mm C modèle 1890. The recoil mechanism was not enough to absorb the barrels recoil forces and this made the piece unstable at firing. This style of carriage and recoil system did not find wider acceptance due to its insufficient performance. In August 1914, 134 mle 1890s were assigned to régiments d'artillerie lourde de campagne (heavy field artillery regiments) and régiments d'artillerie à pied (fortress artillery regiments) in forts of the Séré de Rivières.

== Ammunition ==
The mle 1881 used separate loading bagged charges and projectiles. The charges were in cloth bags and the weight of propellant could be varied from .6–2.8 kg (1 lb 5 oz – 6 lb 3 oz) to vary range and velocity.

Type	Name	Projectile	Yield	Notes
High Explosive	Obus ordinaires	40 kg (88 lb)	1.4–2.1 kg (3 lb 1 oz – 4 lb 10 oz); Black Powder or Melinite	
High Explosive	Obus allongés Mle 1890	43 kg (95 lb)	10.3 kg (23 lb) Melinite	
High Explosive	Obus de 4½ calibres	43.7 kg (96 lb)	12 kg (26 lb)	
Armor Piercing	Obus de rupture	?	?	
Shrapnel	Obus à balles	40.59 kg (89 lb 8 oz)	450 g (16 oz) + 270 pellets	26.1 g (0.92 oz) lead pellets
Grapeshot	Obus à mitraille	40.5 kg (89 lb)	550 g (1 lb 3 oz) + 416 pellets	25 g (0.88 oz) lead pellets
Grapeshot	Boites à mitraille	39.6 kg (87 lb)	429 pellets	65 g (2.3 oz) lead pellets
Incendiary	Projectiles incendiairies	?	800 g (1 lb 12 oz) Melinite + 30 incendiary cylinders	

== Gallery ==
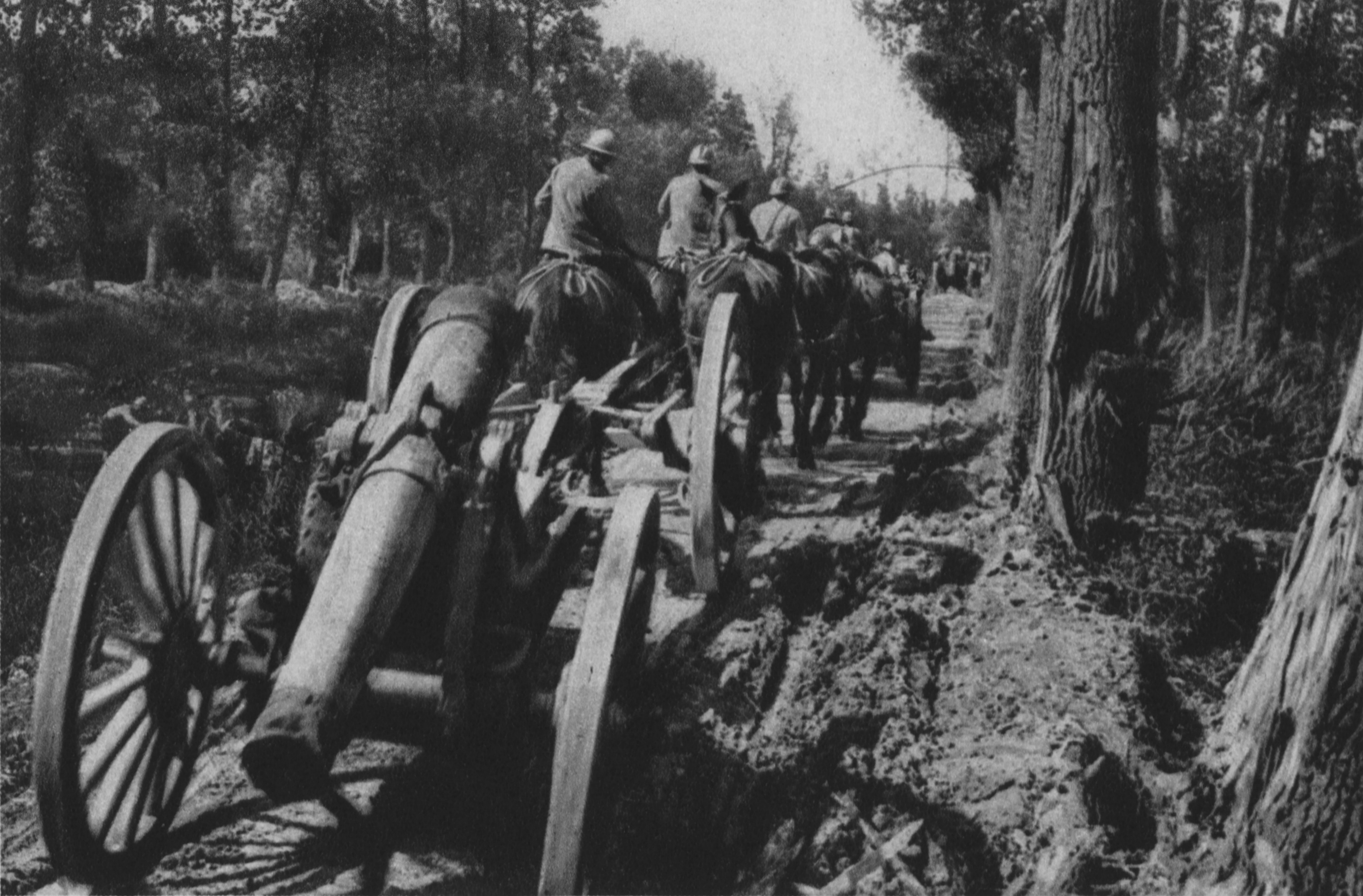
A Obusier de 155 mm C on the road along the Somme Canal 10 July 1917.

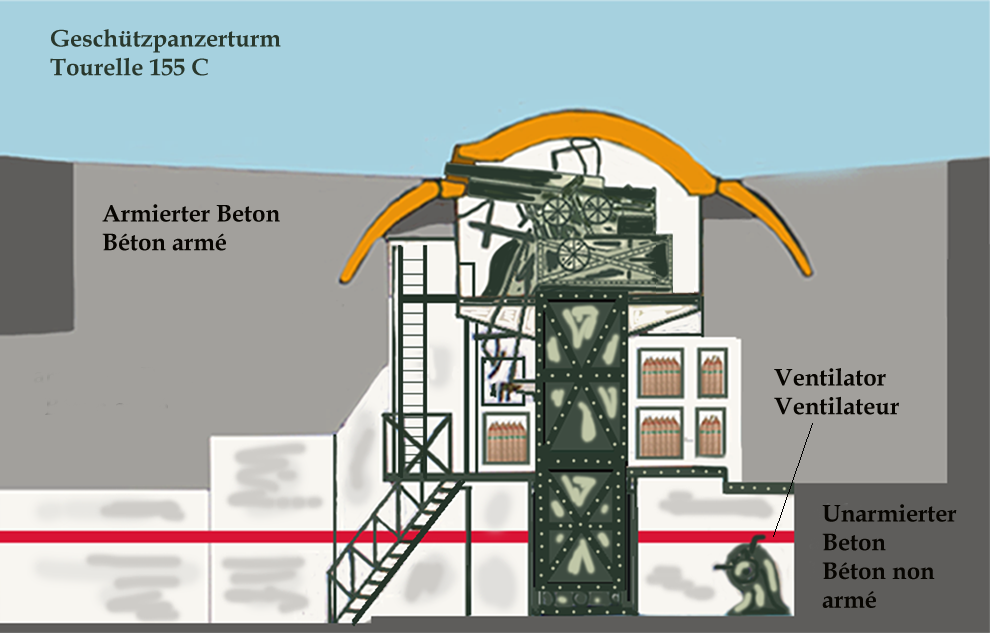
Tourelle de 155 C modèle 1908.

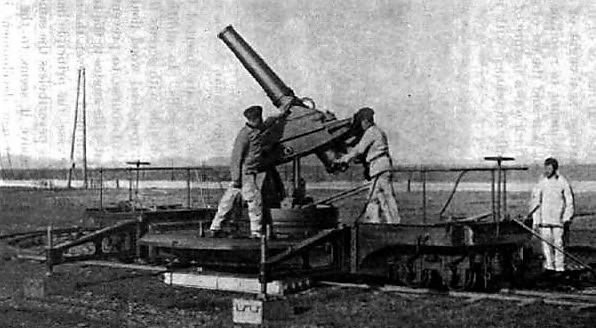
The rail mounted Obusier de 155 C modèle 1881 sur affût-truck Peigné-Canet mle 1897.

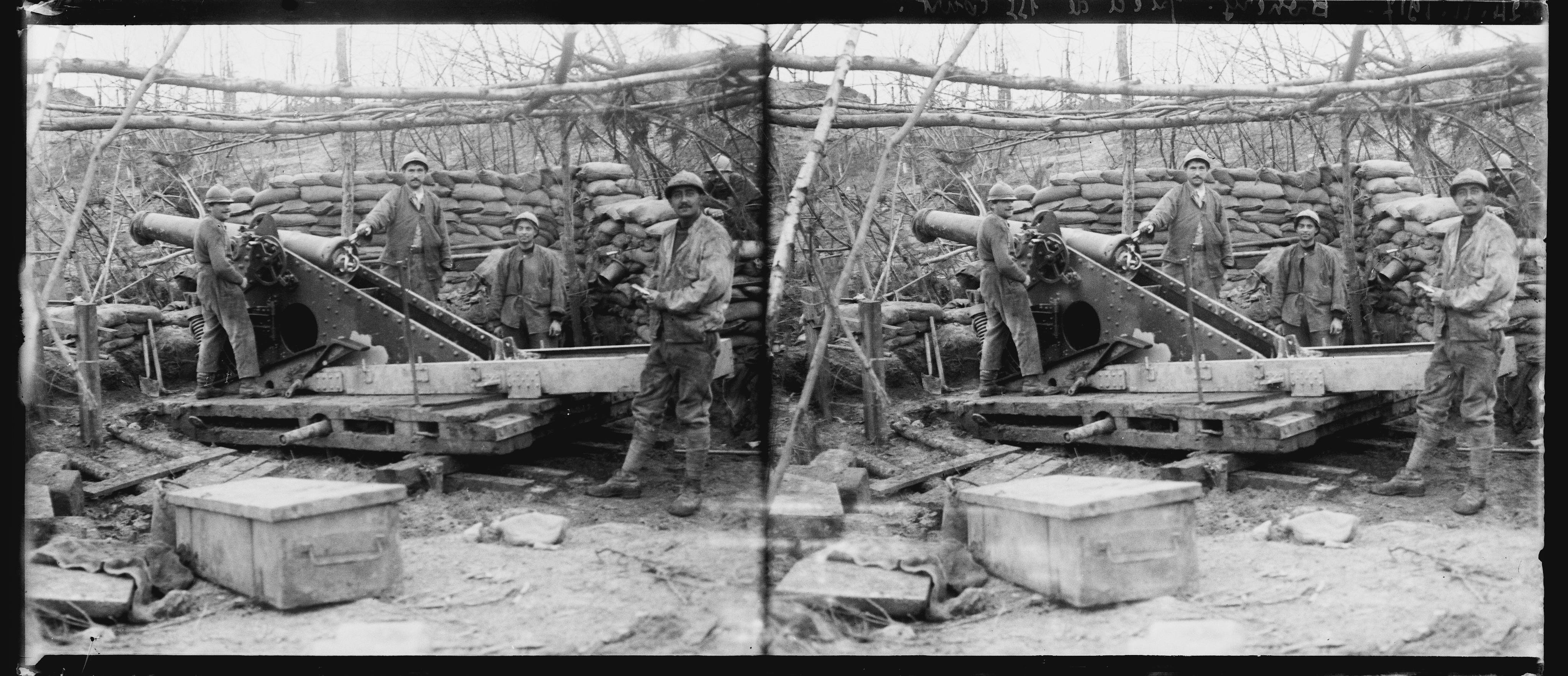
The related Obusier de 155 mm C mle 1881/12 Filloux.

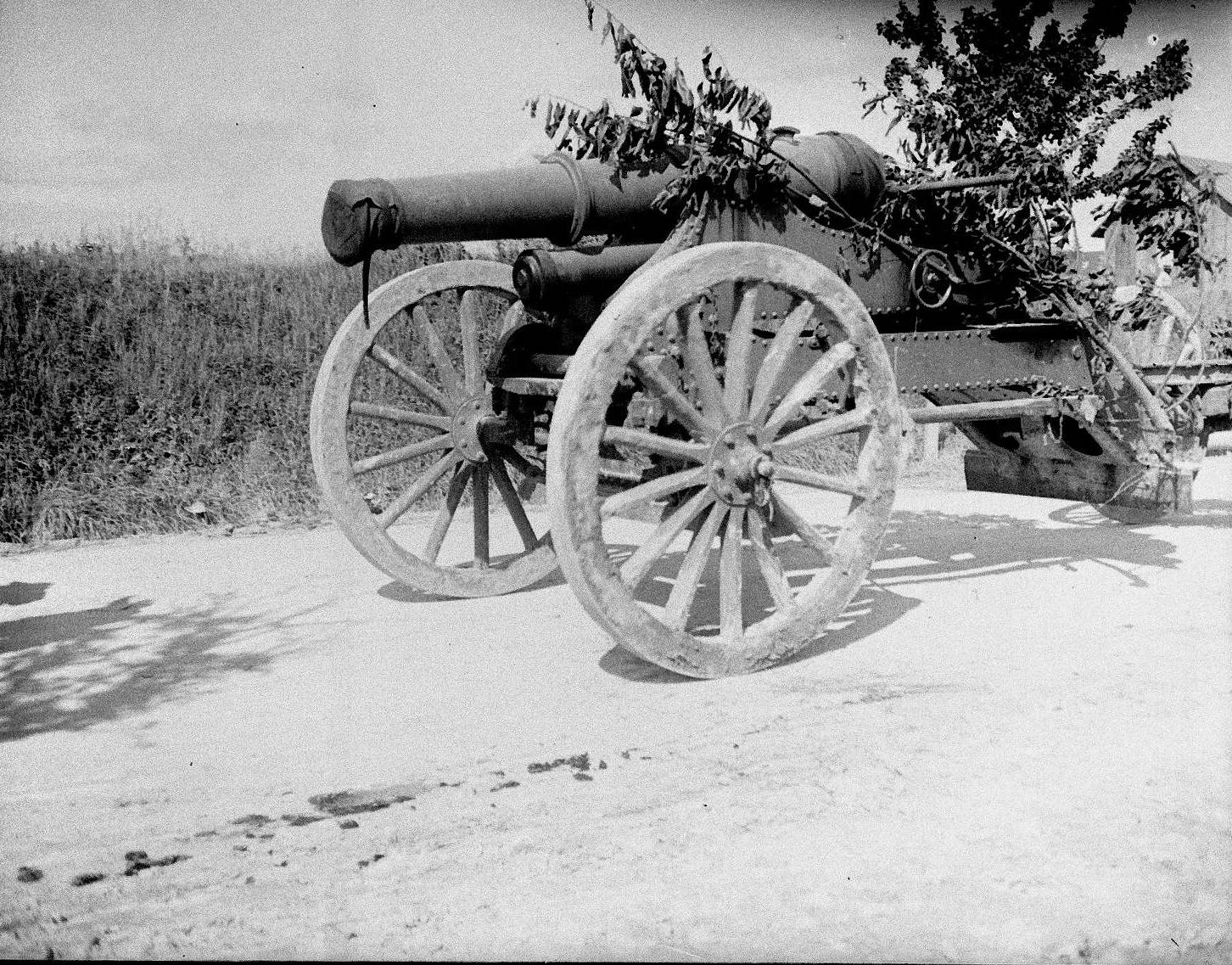
The related Obusier de 155 mm C modèle 1890.
