= Obusier de 155 mm C modèle 1890 =

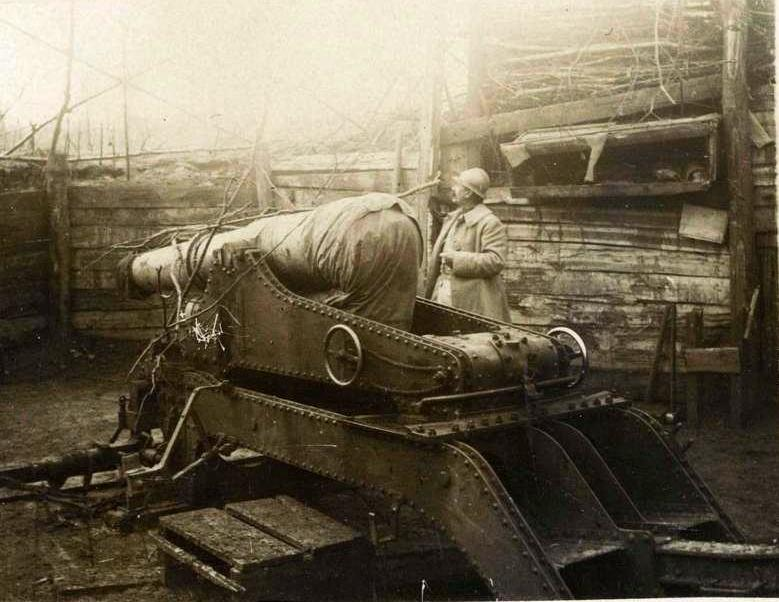
- Type: Howitzer; Siege gun
- Place of origin: France

Service history
- In service: 1890–1918
- Wars: World War I

Production history
- Designed: 1890
- Produced: 1890
- No. built: 134

Specifications
- Mass: Combat: 3,315 kg (7,308 lb); Travel: 3,865 kg (8,521 lb)
- Barrel length: 2.4 m (7 ft 10 in) L/15.5
- Crew: 5
- Shell: Separate loading bagged charges and projectiles
- Shell weight: 40–43.7 kg (88–96 lb)
- Caliber: 155 mm (6.1 in)
- Breech: de Bange
- Recoil: Hydro-pneumatic
- Carriage: Box trail
- Elevation: -5° to +65°
- Traverse: 16°
- Rate of fire: 1.5 rpm
- Muzzle velocity: 303 m/s (990 ft/s)
- Effective firing range: 6.3 km (4 mi)
- Maximum firing range: 7.7 km (5 mi)

The Obusier de 155 mm C modèle 1890 - was a French howitzer designed by Captain Louis Henry Auguste Baquet and employed by the French army during the First World War. It was one of the first modern howitzers equipped with a recoil system.

== History ==
Development of the mle 1890 began in 1886 at the Atelier-de-précision in Paris, following a request by the French Army for a mobile heavy howitzer capable of high angle fire.

== Design ==
The mle 1890 is a transitional piece and was a combination of both old and new ideas. It was a breech loaded howitzer with a steel barrel and a de Bange obturator designed by Colonel Charles Ragon de Bange which used separate loading bagged charges and projectiles. The barrel was the same as used on the earlier Obusier de 155 mm C modele 1881 siege gun. The steel box trail carriage had two wooden spoked wheels with steel rims and was designed to be light enough to be horse-drawn in one piece. The carriage was split into two parts, a stationary lower part which supported the weapon and a sliding upper part which supported the gun barrel. The barrel was inserted into a cradle with a hydro-pneumatic recoil system below the barrel which connected to the lower portion of the carriage.

The cradle and carriage had a hollow center section to allow for high angles of elevation, while the front of the cradle pivoted to allow limited traverse. When the gun fired the cradle recoiled backward, while the lower part stayed anchored. This style of carriage and recoil system was also used by the less powerful Obusier de 120 mm C modèle 1890. The recoil mechanism was not enough to absorb the barrels recoil forces and this made the piece unstable at firing. This style of carriage and recoil system did not find wider acceptance due to its insufficient performance.

== First world war ==
Although the majority of combatants had heavy field artillery prior to the outbreak of the First World War, none had adequate numbers of heavy guns in service, nor had they foreseen the growing importance of heavy artillery once the Western Front stagnated and trench warfare set in. Fortresses, armories, coastal fortifications, and museums were scoured for heavy artillery and sent to the front. Suitable field and rail carriages were built for these guns in an effort to give their forces the heavy field artillery needed to overcome trenches and hardened concrete fortifications.

In August 1914, 134 mle 1890s were assigned to régiments d'artillerie lourde de campagne (heavy field artillery regiments) and régiments d'artillerie à pied (fortress artillery regiments) in forts of the Séré de Rivières.

== Ammunition ==
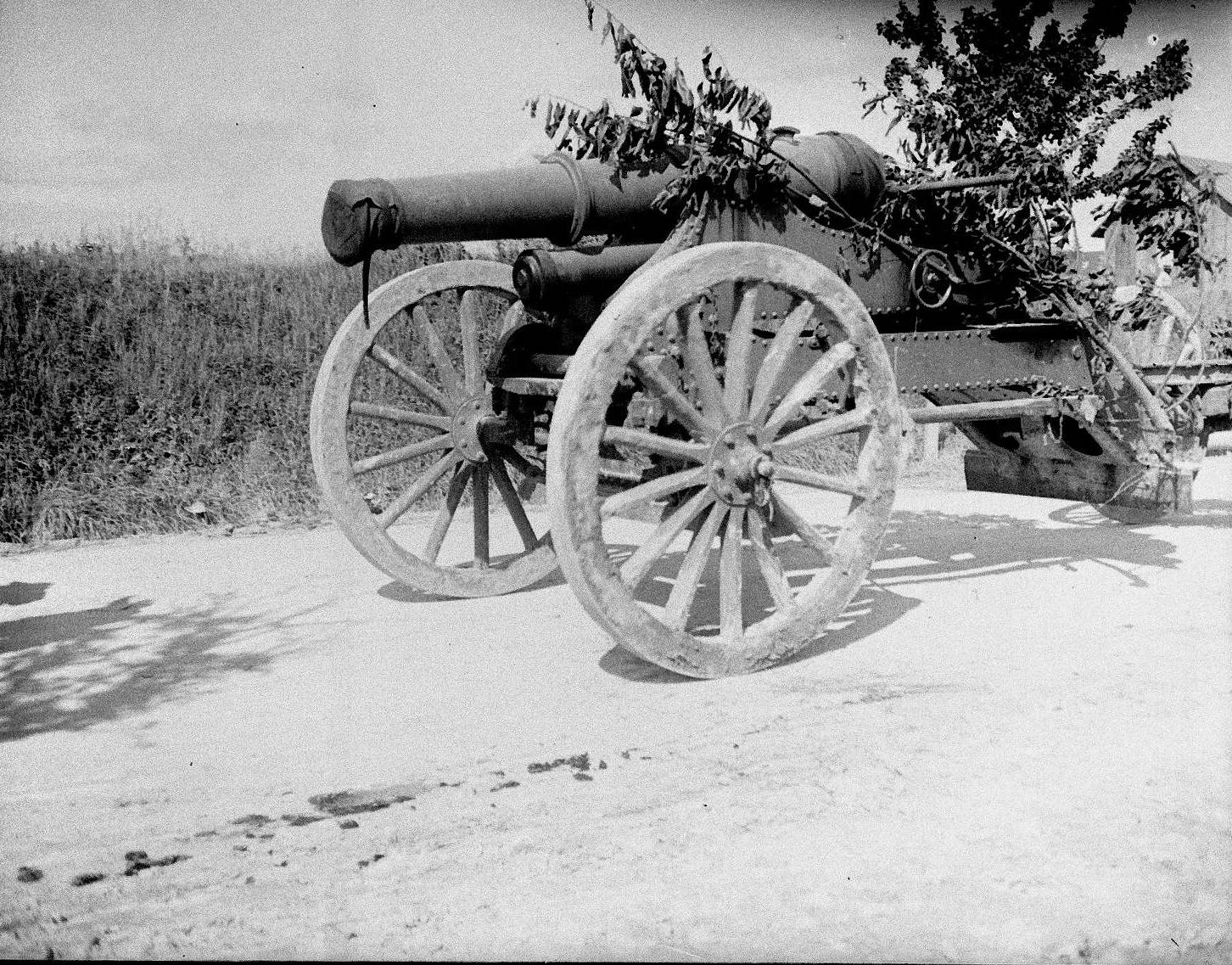

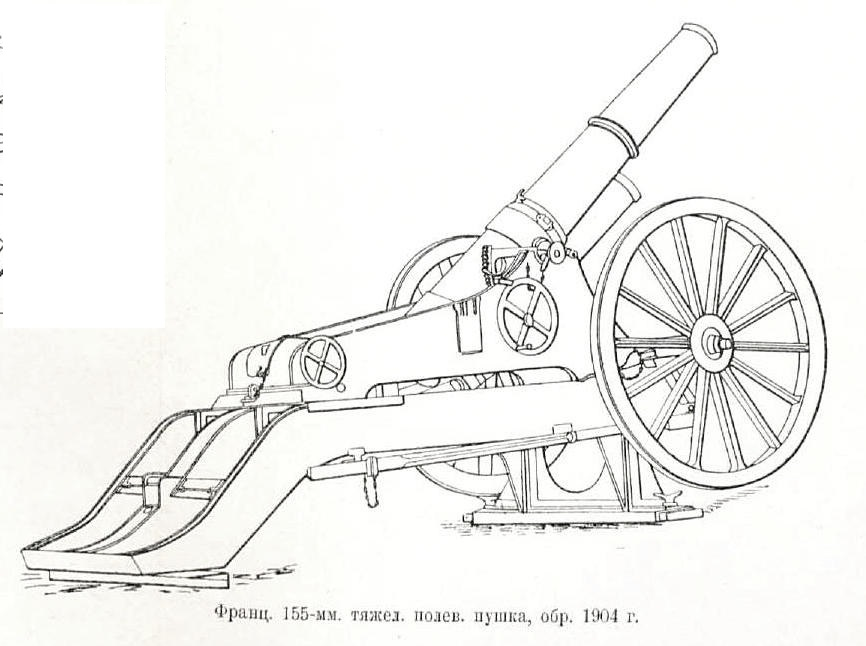

The mle 1881 used separate loading bagged charges and projectiles. The charges were in cloth bags and the weight of propellant could be varied from .6–2.8 kg (1 lb 5 oz – 6 lb 3 oz) to vary range and velocity.

Type	Name	Projectile	Yield	Notes
High Explosive	Obus ordinaires	40 kg (88 lb)	1.4–2.1 kg (3 lb 1 oz – 4 lb 10 oz); Black Powder or Melinite	
High Explosive	Obus allongés Mle 1890	43 kg (95 lb)	10.3 kg (23 lb) Melinite	
High Explosive	Obus de 4½ calibres	43.7 kg (96 lb)	12 kg (26 lb)	
Armor Piercing	Obus de rupture	?	?	
Shrapnel	Obus à balles	40.59 kg (89 lb 8 oz)	450 g (16 oz) + 270 pellets	26.1 g (0.92 oz) lead pellets
Grapeshot	Obus à mitraille	40.5 kg (89 lb)	550 g (1 lb 3 oz) + 416 pellets	25 g (0.88 oz) lead pellets
Grapeshot	Boites à mitraille	39.6 kg (87 lb)	429 pellets	65 g (2.3 oz) lead pellets
Incendiary	Projectiles incendiairies	?	800 g (1 lb 12 oz) Melinite + 30 incendiary cylinders	
