= Obusier de 120 mm C modèle 1890 =

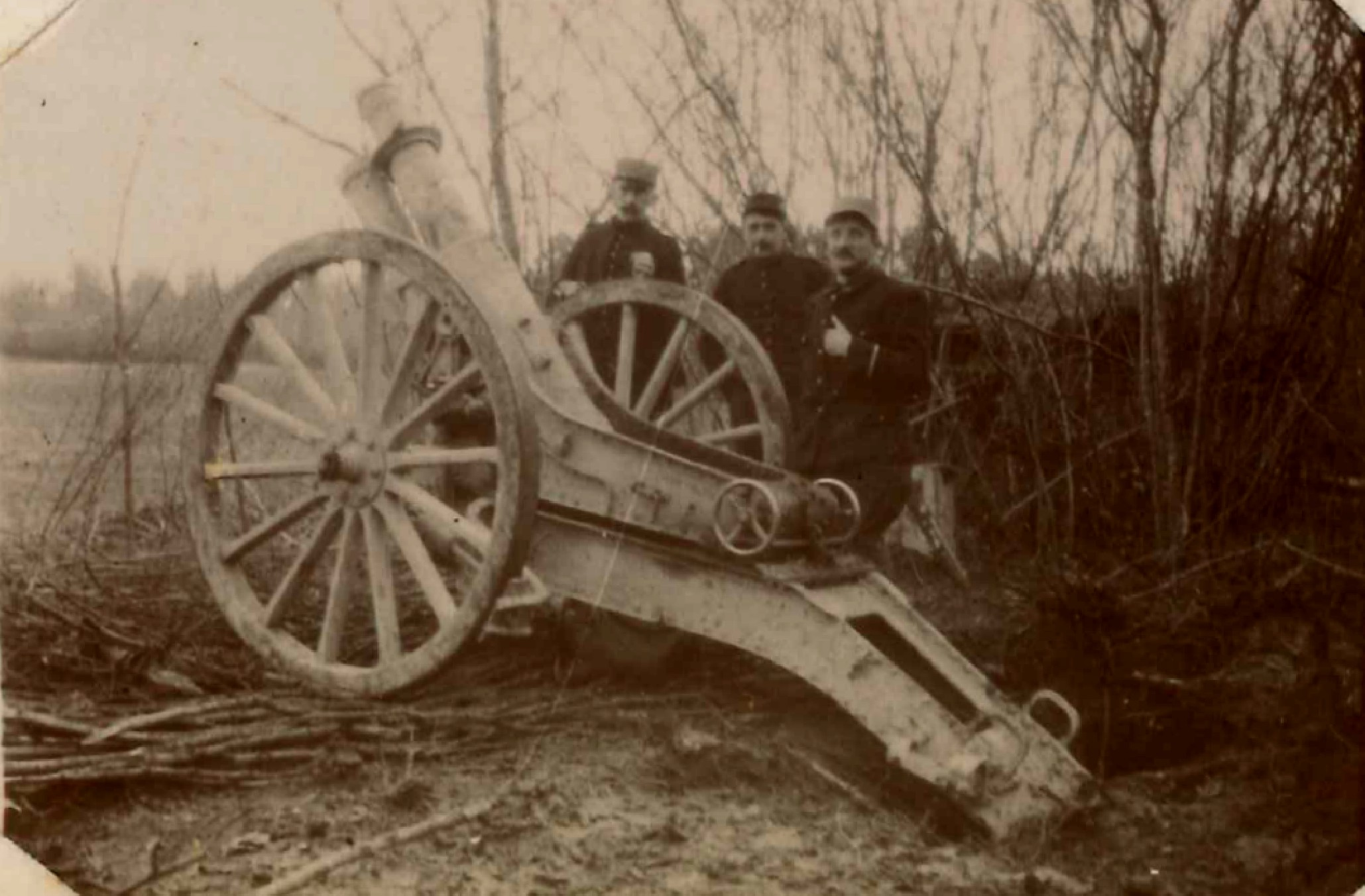
- Obuier de 120 mm C Baquet, bois de Gernicourt (Aisne), 1915
- Type: Howitzer; Siege gun
- Place of origin: France

Service history
- In service: 1890–1918
- Wars: World War I

Production history
- Designed: 1890
- Produced: 1890
- No. built: 230

Specifications
- Mass: Travel: 2,365 kg (5,214 lb); Combat: 1,475 kg (3,252 lb)
- Barrel length: 1.7 m (5 ft 7 in) L/14
- Crew: 5
- Shell: Separate loading bagged charges and projectiles
- Shell weight: 18–20 kg (40–44 lb)
- Caliber: 120 mm (4.7 in)
- Breech: de Bange
- Recoil: Hydro-pneumatic
- Carriage: Box trail
- Elevation: -12° to +40°
- Traverse: 10°
- Rate of fire: 2 rpm
- Muzzle velocity: 284 m/s (930 ft/s)
- Effective firing range: 2.38 km (1 mi)
- Maximum firing range: 5.8 km (4 mi)

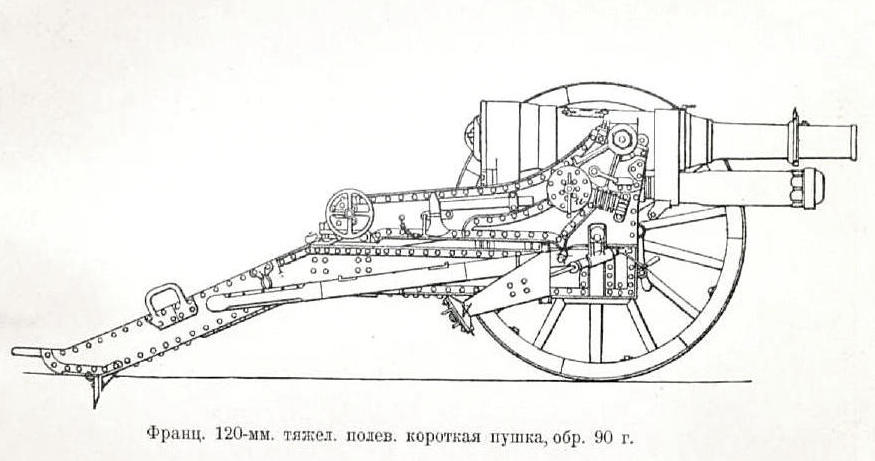

The Obusier de 120 mm C modèle 1890 - was a French howitzer designed by Captain Louis Henry Auguste Baquet and employed by the French army during the First World War. It was one of the first modern howitzers equipped with a recoil system.

== History ==
Development of the modèle 1890 began in 1886 at the Atelier-de-précision in Paris, following a request by the French Army for a mobile howitzer capable of high angle fire. Adopted in 1890, it was assigned to heavy field artillery regiments (artillerie lourde de campagne) and to artillery regiments (régiments d'artillerie à pied) of the Séré de Rivières fortress system.

The modèle is mentioned in the documents of the so-called Dreyfus Affair, in which artillery captain Alfred Dreyfus was accused of disclosing (or wanting to disclose) the howitzer's technical data.

== Design ==
The modèle 1890 was a transitional piece and was a combination of both old and new ideas. It was a breech loaded howitzer with a steel barrel and a de Bange obturator designed by Colonel Charles Ragon de Bange which used separate loading bagged charges and projectiles. The steel box trail carriage had two wooden spoked wheels with steel rims and was designed to be light enough to be horse-drawn in one piece. The carriage was split into two parts, a stationary lower part which supported the weapon and a sliding upper part which supported the gun barrel. The upper part was L-shaped and the gun barrel was inserted into a cradle with a hydro-pneumatic recoil system below the barrel which connected to the lower portion of the carriage.

The cradle and carriage had a hollow center section to allow for high angles of elevation, while the front of the cradle pivoted to allow limited traverse. When the gun fired the cradle recoiled backwards, while the lower part stayed anchored. This recoil system was also used by the more powerful Obusier de 155 mm C modèle 1890, which mounted the gun barrel of the Obusier de 155 mm C modèle 1881 on the same style of carriage. The recoil mechanism was not enough to absorb the barrel's recoil forces and this made the piece unstable at firing. This style of carriage and recoil system did not find wider acceptance due to its insufficient performance.

== First World War ==
Although the majority of combatants had heavy field artillery prior to the outbreak of the First World War, none had adequate numbers of heavy guns in service, nor had they foreseen the growing importance of heavy artillery once the Western Front stagnated and trench warfare set in. Fortresses, armories, coastal fortifications, and museums were scoured for heavy artillery and sent to the front. Suitable field and rail carriages were built for these guns in an effort to give their forces the heavy field artillery needed to overcome trenches and hardened concrete fortifications.

In August 1914 the heavy field artillery regiments (artillerie lourde de campagne) were equipped with 5 regiments of modèle 1890's, with 3 batteries per regiment, and 6 howitzers per battery for a total of 90 howitzers. Each regiment was provided with 400 rounds of ammunition and the available ammunition supply was 1,280,000 rounds. The modèle 1890's were used until they either wore out or were destroyed.

Romania got 12 pieces in 1916 and another 13 in 1917 for a total of 25 howitzers. Twenty remained in service by the beginning of 1918. They were also used in 1919 during the Hungarian–Romanian War. After that conflict they were retired from use due to the small number available and shortage of ammunition for them, being replaced by the more numerous and technically superior 122 mm howitzer M1910.
