= Territorial Army (France) =

The French Territorial Army (French: Armée territoriale) was a component of the French Army from 1872 to 1918. It consisted of men aged from 34 to 49 who were considered too old and insufficiently trained to serve in an active or reserve regiment.

== Creation ==
The Territorial Army was created by law on 27 July 1872 which established the principles of the military reserve.

This law established a military service obligation of twenty years for French men as follows:

- five years in the active army;
- four years in the Army Reserve;
- five years in the Territorial Army;
- six years in the Territorial Army Reserve.

== World War I ==
On 1 August 1914, France decreed a general mobilisation of its armed forces. A total of 145 territorial infantry regiments were formed at the start of hostilities. In addition, the Territorial Army formed cavalry squadrons, artillery groups, engineering battalions, and logistics units.

The Territorial Army was not intended to serve on the frontline. However, territorial units in the northern and eastern regions were engaged in battle to defend their towns and villages.

Thirteen territorial infantry divisions were formed to guard the Spanish and Italian borders, provide coastal defence against a German naval landing, and provide a reserve around Paris. As these threats receded, these divisions were gradually moved towards the frontline.

On August 1st, 1918, all existing territorial regiments were disbanded and their men distributed among the active and reserve regiments. Starting in January 1919, the Territorial Army began demobilising.
