= German designations of foreign artillery in World War II =

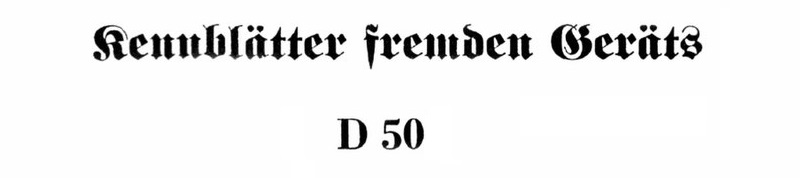
D 50 title on coverpage of designation

During World War II, Germany maintained comprehensive lists of enemy weapons which were given designations in German in a system that matched that of German weapons. When these weapons were captured and put into use with German forces, they were referred to by these designations.

== Background ==
Before the war began, the German armed forces Heereswaffenamt compiled a list of known foreign equipment and assigned a unique number to each weapon. These weapons were called Fremdgerät or Beutegerät ("foreign device" or "captured device") and their technical details were recorded in a fourteen-volume set that was periodically updated. The Germans also captured large amounts of foreign equipment during WWII that they tested and cataloged using the same system. The Germans sometimes referred to these weapons as Kriegsbeute ("war booty") and the Fremdgerät numbers are sometimes referred to as Beutenummern ("booty numbers"). See also Glossary of German military terms.

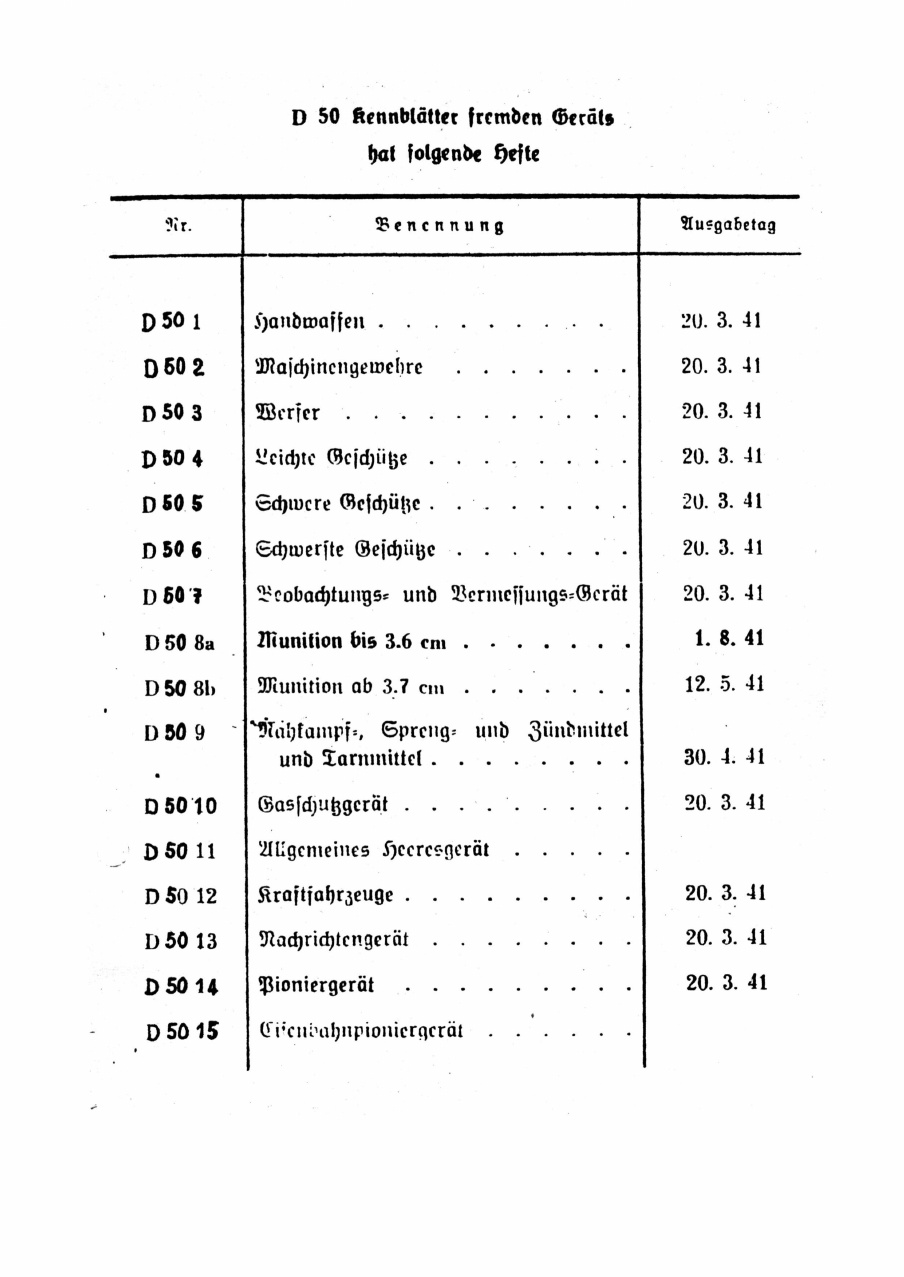
Overview of Contents

Volumes	German	Content
D.50/1	Handwaffen	Pistols, rifles and sub-machine guns
D.50/2	Maschinengewehre	Light and heavy machine guns
D.50/3	Werfer	Mortars
D.50/4	Leichte Geschütze	Light artillery
D.50/5	Schwere Geschütze	Heavy artillery
D.50/6	Schwerste Geschütze	Siege and railway artillery
D.50/12	Kraftfahrzeuge	Vehicles
D.50/14	Pioniergeräte	Engineering equipment and explosives

== Designation format ==
The format for these designations is made up of the following elements:

- Calibre expressed in centimetres
- The type of weapon
- A model number (e.g. M23) or year (e.g. 1934)
- In the absence of a model or year number, a unique number was assigned.
- A subvariant is indicated with a number after a "/".
- A letter indicating the national origin of the weapon.

As an example, "9 cm Flak M12 (t)" is a Czechoslovak 90mm anti-aircraft gun Model 12.

German designations for countries
Letter code	German	English
(a)	Amerikanisch	American
(b)	Belgisch	Belgian
(d)	Dänisch	Danish
(e)	Englisch	English
(f)	Französisch	French
(g)	Griechisch	Greek
(h)	Holländisch	Dutch
(i)	Italienisch	Italian
(j)	Jugoslawisch	Yugoslavian
(n)	Norwegisch	Norwegian
(ö)	Österreichisch	Austrian
(p)	Polnisch	Polish
(r)	Russisch	Russian (Soviet)
(s)	Schweizerisch	Swiss
(t)	Tschechisch	Czechoslovak
(u)	Ungarisch	Hungarian

== German artillery types ==
German designation for long range artillery gun
Short designation	Full designation	English
K.	Kanone	Gun/Cannon
s. K. / s.K.	schwere Kanone	Heavy Gun/Cannon
KH.	Kanonenhaubitze	Gun-howitzer
K. auf Sfl.	Kanone auf Selbstfahrlafette	Gun on self-propelled mount
Kst.K.	Küstenkanone	Coastal cannon

German designation for long range howitzer
Short designation	Full designation	English
H.	Haubitze	Howitzer
s.H.	schwere Haubitze	Heavy howitzer
Mrs.	Mörser	Heavy mortar (heavy howitzer)
kz. Mrs.	kurze Mörser	Short heavy mortar
Mrs. auf Sfl.	Mörser auf Selbstfahrlafette	Heavy mortar on self-propelled mount
Kst.Mrs.	Küstenmörser	Coastal heavy mortar

German designation for field artillery
Short designation	Full designation	English
FK.	Feldkanone	Field gun
le.FK.	leichte Feldkanone	Light field gun
le.FH.	leichte Feldhaubitze	Light field howitzer
s.FH.	schwere Feldhaubitze	Heavy field howitzer

German designation for railroad artillery
Short designation	Full designation	English
K.(E)	Kanone (Eisenbahn)	Railroad gun
K.-Gl.-(E)	Kanone (Eisenbahn) in Gleitlafette	Railroad gun (Sliding carriage)
K.-W.-(E)	Kanone (Eisenbahn) in Wiegenlafette	Railroad gun (Cradle carriage)
Kst.K.(E)	Küstenkanone (Eisenbahn)	Coastal defense railroad gun
H.(E)	Haubitze (Eisenbahn)	Railroad howitzer

German designation for mortars
Short designation	Full designation	English
GrW	Granatwerfer	Mortar
Fest.GrW	Festungsgranatwerfer	Fortress mortar
Grb.GrW	Grabengranatenwerfer	Trench mortar
Geb.GrW	Gebirgsgranatwerfer	Mountain mortar
Sp.GrW	Spatengranatwerfer	Spade mortar
MnW	Minenwerfer	Mortar
NbW	Nebelwerfer	Smoke mortar
Kw.NbW	Kampfwagennebelwerfer	Tank smoke mortar
Br.KgW	Brandkugelwerfer	Ampoule thrower

German designation for mountain guns
Short designation	Full designation	English
Geb.K.	Gebirgskanone	Mountain gun
Geb.H.	Gebirgshaubitze	Mountain howitzer
le.Geb.H.	leichte Gebirgshaubitze	Light mountain howitzer

German designation for other types of artillery
Short designation	Full designation	English
FlaK	Flugabwehrkanone	Anti-aircraft gun
PaK Fest.PaK	Panzerabwehrkanone Festungspanzerabwehrkanone	Anti-tank cannon Fortress anti-tank cannon
KwK KwK auf Kas.Laf.	Kampfwagenkanone Kampfwagenkanone auf Kasematelafette	Tank cannon Casemate gun
SK (in DrhL)	Schnelladekanone in Drehscheibenlafette	Quick-loading naval cannon in turntable mount
IG. IK. IKH.	Infanteriegeschütz Infanteriekanone Infanteriekanonehaubitze	Infantry gun Infantry gun Infantry gun-howitzer

== Sort by Letter Code/Country ==
=== (a)/United States ===
Designation		Weapon		Image
Short Desig.	Alt. Desig.	Model	Design Origin	Image
7.5 cm FK 341/1(a)		75 mm Field Gun M1897 (Carriage M18987)	United States	
7.5 cm FK 341/2(a)		75 mm Field Gun M1897A4 (Carriage M1897A4)	United States	
7.5 cm FK 342/1(a)		75 mm Field Gun M1916 (Carriage M1916)	United States	
7.5 cm FK 342/2(a)		75 mm Field Gun M1916MI (Carriage M1916A1)	United States	
7.5 cm FK 344(a)		75 mm Field Gun M1917 (Carriage M1917)	United States	
7.5 cm FK 345(a)		75 mm Field Gun M1897 (Carriage M2A2)	United States	
7.5 cm Geb.H. 312(a)		75 mm Pack Howitzer (Vickers)	United Kingdom	
7.5 cm Geb.H. 313(a)		75mm Pack Howitzer M1 (Carriage M1)	United States	
3.7 cm IK. 147(a)		37 mm Infantry Gun M1916	United States	
3.7 cm Pak 148(a)		37 mm Gun M3 (Carriage M4)	United States	
5.7 cm Pak 202(a)	5.7 cm Pak M1 (a) auf Laf. M1A3 (a)	57 mm Gun M1 (Carriage M1A3)	United States	
	7.62 cm Pak M5 (a) auf Laf. M1 (a)	3-inch Gun M5 (Carriage M1)	United States	
	7.62 cm Pak M5 (a) auf Laf. M6 (a)	3-inch Gun M5 (Carriage M6)	United States	
	9 cm Pak T8 (a)	90 mm Gun T8 (Carriage T5E2)	United States	

=== (b)/Belgium ===
Designation		Weapon		Image
Short Desig.	Alt. Desig.	Model	Design Origin	Image
	2 cm Flak Madsen (b)	C20 DTCA	Denmark	
	4 cm Flak 28(b)	C40 DTCA M35	Sweden	
	7.5 cm Flak (b)	C75 DTCA M27	Belgium	
	7.5 cm Flak Vickers M.35 (b)	C75 DTCA M32	United Kingdom	
7.5 cm FK 233(b)		Canon de 75 M^{le} GP I	Belgium	
7.5 cm FK 234(b)		Canon de 75 M^{le} GP II	Belgium	
7.5 cm FK 235(b)		Canon de 75 M^{le} TR	Belgium	
7.5 cm FK 236(b)		Canon de 75 M^{le} GP III	Belgium	
7.5 cm Geb.K. 228(b)		Canon de 75 M^{le} 34	Sweden	
7.6 cm IG. 260(b)		Canon de 76 FRC	Belgium	
12 cm K. 370(b)		Canon de 120 L M^{le} 31	Belgium	
4 cm Pak 154(b)		QF 2-pdr Mk.IX, X (Carriage Mk.II)	United Kingdom	
4.7 cm Pak 185(b)		C.47 F.R.C. Mod.31	Belgium	

=== (d)/Denmark ===
Designation		Weapon		Image
Short Desig.	Alt. Desig.	Model	Design Origin	Image
7.5 cm FK 240(d)		75 mm feltkanon m/03	Germany	
	2 cm Flak Madsen (d)	20 mm luftværnskanon m/33	Denmark	
	2 cm Flak Madsen (d)	20 mm luftværnskanon m/37	Denmark	
	7.5 cm Flak Vickers M.35 (d)	75 mm luftværnskanon m/32	United Kingdom	
10.5 cm K. 321(d)		105 mm feltkanon m/30	France	
3.7 cm Pak 157(d)		37 mm fodfolkskanon m/34 (Bofors)	Sweden	
3.7 cm Pak 164(d)		37 mm fodfolkskanon m/35 (Madsen) _{Link}	Belgium	

=== (e)/United Kingdom (British Empire) ===
Designation		Weapon		Image
Short Desig.	Alt. Desig.	Model	Design Origin	Image
	4 cm Flak 28(e)	QF 40 mm Mark I	Sweden	
	7.5 cm Flak Vickers (e)	QF 3-inch 20cwt Mark I	United Kingdom	
	9.4 cm Flak Vickers M.39 (e)	QF 3.7-inch Mark I	United Kingdom	
9.4 cm Geb.H. 301(e)		QF 3.7-inch howitzer Mk I (Carriage Mk I)	United Kingdom	
9.4 cm IH. 302(e)		QF 3.7-inch howitzer Mk I (Carriage Mk IVP)	United Kingdom	
11.4 cm K. 365(e)		BL 4.5-in. Medium Gun Mk I (Carriage 60-pdr Mk IV, IVP)	United Kingdom	
38 cm Kst.K. 731(e)		BL 15-in. coastal gun Mk I	United Kingdom	
4 cm Pak 192(e)		QF 2-pdr Mk.IX, X (Carriage Mk.II)	United Kingdom	
5.7 cm Pak 209(e)		QF 6-pdr Mk II (Carriage Mk I, IA, II)	United Kingdom	
5.7 cm Pak 209(e)		QF 6-pdr Mk IV (Carriage Mk I, IA, II)	United Kingdom	

=== (f)/France ===
Designation		Weapon		Image
Short Desig.	Alt. Desig.	Model	Design Origin	Image
	6.5 cm Fest.Pak M.02 (f)	Canon de 65 mm M^{le} 1902	France	
7.5 cm FK 231(f)		Canon de 75 M^{le} 97	France	
7.5 cm FK 231(f)		Canon de 75 M^{le} 97/38	France	
7.5 cm FK 232(f)		Canon de 75 M^{le} 97/33	France	
	2.5 cm Flak Hotchkiss (f) 2.5 cm Flak 38(f)	Mitrailleuse de 25 mm CA M^{le} 1938	France	
	2.5 cm Flak Hotchkiss (f) 2.5 cm Flak 39(f)	Mitrailleuse de 25 mm CA M^{le} 1939	France	
	7.5 cm Flak M.17/34 (f)	Canon de 75 mm CA M^{le} 17/34	France	
	7.5 cm Flak M.22-24 (f)	Canon de 75 mm CA M^{le} 22/24	France	
	7.5 cm Flak M.30 (f)	Canon de 75 mm CA M^{le} 30	France	
	7.5 cm Flak M.32 (f) 7.5 cm Flak M.36 (f)	Canon de 75 mm CA M^{le} 32 Canon de 75 mm CA M^{le} 36	France	
	7.5 cm Flak M.33 (f)	Canon de 75 mm CA M^{le} 33	France	
	9 cm Flak M.39 (f)	Canon de 90 mm CA M^{le} 39	France	
6.5 cm Geb.K. 221(f)		Canon de 65 M M^{le} 06	France	
3.7 cm IK. 152(f)		Canon d'I de 37 M^{le} 16 TRP	France	
	9.5 cm Kst.K. (f)	Canon de 95 modèle 1904 Lahitolle	France	
2.5 cm Pak 112(f)		25 mm SA-L M^{le} 34	France	
2.5 cm Pak 113(f)		25 mm SA-L M^{le} 37	France	
4.7 cm Pak 181(f)		47 mm SA M^{le} 1937	France	
4.7 cm Pak 183(f)		47 mm SA M^{le} 1939	France	
	34 cm SK M.12 (f) in DrhL (f)	340 mm/45 Modèle 1912	France	

=== (g)/Greece ===
Designation		Weapon		Image
Short Desig.	Alt. Desig.	Model	Design Origin	Image
8.5 cm KH. 287(g)		Schneider Field Gun; 85 mm (model 1927)	France	
10.5 cm K. 310(g)		Schneider Field Gun; 105 mm (model 1925)	France	
10.5 cm K. 340(g)		Schneider Field Gun; 105 mm (model 1927)	France	

=== (h)/Netherlands ===
Designation		Weapon		Image
Short Desig.	Alt. Desig.	Model	Design Origin	Image
	2 cm Flak 28(h)	Kanon Van 2 TL no.1	Switzerland	
	2 cm Flak Scotti (h)	Kanon Van 2 TL no.2	Italy	
	4 cm Flak 28(h)	Kanon Van 4 TL	Sweden	
	7.5 cm Flak Vickers M.35 (h)	Kanon Van 7.5 TL 1 no.1	United Kingdom	
7.5 cm FK 241(h)		Stuk van 7-veld (OM.04) (Note: nl.wiki Link.)	Netherlands	
7.5 cm FK 242(h)		Stuk van 7-veld (NM.10)	Netherlands	
7.5 cm FK 243(h)		Stuk van 7-veld (M.02/03)	Germany; Netherlands	
7.5 cm FK 243(h)		Stuk van 7-veld (M.02/04)	Germany; Netherlands	
10.5 cm K. 334(h)		Stuk van 10-veld (Krupp) _{Link}	Germany	
10.5 cm K. 335(h)		Stuk van 10-veld (Bofors)	Sweden	
3.7 cm Pak 153(h)		Pantserafweergeschut van 37 (Rheinmetall)	Germany	
4.7 cm Pak 187(h)		Pantserafweergeschut van 47 (Böhler)	Austria	
4.7 cm Pak 188(h)		Pantserafweergeschut van 47 (Rheinmetall)	Germany	
	24 cm SK C94 (h) in DrhL (h)	24 cm SK L/40 Krupp C/94	Germany	

=== (i)/Italy ===
Designation		Weapon		Image
Short Desig.	Alt. Desig.	Model	Design Origin	Image
7.5 cm le.FH. 255(i)		Obice da 75/18 modello 35	Italy	
7.5 cm FK 237(i)		Cannone da 75/27 modello 06	Germany; Italy	
7.5 cm FK 244(i)		Cannone da 75/27 modello 11	France; Italy	
7.5 cm le.FK 245(i)		Cannone da 75/27 modello 12	Germany; Italy	
7.5 cm FK 248(i)		Cannone da 75/32 modello 37	Italy	
	2 cm Flak Breda (i)	Cannone-Mitragliera da 20/65 (Breda)	Italy	
	2 cm Flak Scotti (i)	Cannone-Mitragliera da 20/77 (Scotti)	Italy	
	3.7 cm Flak Breda (i)	Cannone-Mitragliera da 37/54 (Breda)	Italy	
7.5 cm Flak 264/1(i)		Cannone da 75/27 A.V.	Italy	
7.5 cm Flak 264/2(i)		Cannone da 75/27 C.K.	Italy	
7.5 cm Flak 264/3(i)		Cannone da 75/46 C.A. modello 34	Italy	
7.5 cm Flak 264/4(i)		Cannone da 75/46 C.A. modello 40	Italy	
7.62 cm Flak 266/1(i) 7.62 cm Flak 266/2(i)		Cannone da 76/40 C.A. Cannone da 76/40 C.A. modificata 1935	Italy	
7.62 cm Flak 266/3(i)		Cannone da 76/45 C.A.	Italy	
7.65 cm Flak 268/1(i)		Cannone da 77/28 C.A.	Italy	
9 cm Flak 309/1(i)	9 cm Flak 41(i)	Cannone da 90/53	Italy	
	10.2 cm Flak (i)	Cannone da 102/35 modello 1914	Italy	
7.5 cm Geb.H. 254(i)		Obice da 75/18 modello 34	Italy	
7.5 cm Geb.K. 259(i)		Obice da 75/13	Italy	
10.5 cm K. 320(i)		Cannone da 105/32	Austria-Hungary	
12 cm K. 372(i)		Cannone da 120/40 A	United Kingdom	
12 cm K. 373(i)		Cannone da 120/21	Germany	
3.7 cm Pak 162(i)		Cannone contracarro da 37/45	Germany	
4.7 cm Pak 177(i)		Cannone controcarro da 47/32	Austria	
5.7 cm Pak 208(i)		Cannone controcarro da 57/43 Modello 1887	Italy	

=== (j)/Yugoslavia ===
Designation		Weapon		Image
Short Desig.	Alt. Desig.	Model	Design Origin	Image
6.5 cm Geb.K. 222(j)		65 mm Schneider M.06 (Brdski topova)	France	
7.5 cm Geb.K. 259(j)		75 mm Škoda M.15 (Brdski top)	Czechoslovakia	
7.5 cm Geb.K. 284(j)		75 mm M.07 (Brdski top)	France	
7.5 cm Geb.K. 284(j)		75 mm M.07a (Brdski top)	France	
7.5 cm Geb.K. 285(j)		75 mm Škoda M.28 (Brdski top)	Czechoslovakia	
3.7 cm IK. 142(j)		37 mm Puteaux M.16 (Pešadijski top)	France	
10.5 cm K. 321(j)		105 mm Schneider M.25 (Teški topova)	France	
10.5 cm K. 339(j)		105 mm Škoda M.36 (Teški topova)	Czechoslovakia	
3.7 cm Pak 156(j)	3.7 cm Pak 37(j)	37 mm Škoda M.39 (Protivtenkovski top)	Czechoslovakia	
4.7 cm Pak 179(j)	4.7 cm Pak 36(j)	47 mm Škoda M.38 (Protivtenkovski top)	Czechoslovakia	

=== (n)/Norway ===
Designation		Weapon		Image
Short Desig.	Alt. Desig.	Model	Design Origin	Image
12 cm le.FH. 375(n)		12 cm felthaubits m/08	Germany	
12 cm le.FH. 376(n)		12 cm felthaubits m/32	Norway	
	12 cm FH. M/15 (n)	12 cm felthaubits m/15	Sweden	
7.5 cm FK 246(n)		7.5 cm Feltkanon m/01	Germany	
7.5 cm Geb.K. 247(n)		7.5 cm Gebirgskanone m/11	Germany	
10.5 cm FK. 337(n)		10.5 cm feltkanon m/04	Belgium	

=== (ö)/Austria ===
Designation		Weapon		Image
Short Desig.	Alt. Desig.	Model	Design Origin	Image
	7.65 cm FK 5/8(ö)	8 cm Feldkanone M. 5/8	Austria-Hungary	
	7.65 cm FK 17(ö)	8 cm Feldkanone M. 17	Austria-Hungary	
	7.65 cm FK 18(ö)	8 cm Feldkanone M. 18	Austria-Hungary	
	10 cm K. 17/04(ö)	10 cm Kanone 17/04	Austria-Hungary	
	4.7 cm Pak 35/36(ö)	4.7 cm PaK 35/36(ö)	Austria	

=== (p)/Poland ===
Designation		Weapon		Image
Short Desig.	Alt. Desig.	Model	Design Origin	Image
	7.5 cm FK 97(p)	75 mm Armata wz. 1897	France	
	7.5 cm FK 02/26(p)	75 mm Armata wz. 02/26	Poland	
	7.62 cm FK 02(p)	76.2 mm Armata wz. 1902	Russian Empire	
	4 cm Flak 28(p)	40 mm Armata przeciwlotnicza Bofors wz. 36	Sweden	
	10.5 cm K. 13(p)	105 mm Armata wz. 13	France	
	10.5 cm K. 29(p)	105 mm Armata wz. 29	France; Poland	
	3.7 cm Pak 36(p)	37 mm Armata ppanc. wz. 36	Sweden	

=== (r)/Soviet Union ===
Designation		Weapon		Image
Short Desig.	Alt. Desig.	Model	Design Origin	Image
12 cm le.FH. 385(r)		120 mm howitzer M1902	Russian Empire	
7.62 cm FK 288(r)		76 mm divizionnaya pushka obr. 1942 (ZiS-3)	Soviet Union	
7.62 cm FK 288/1(r)		76 mm divizionnaya pushka obr. 1942 (ZiS-3)	Soviet Union	
7.62 cm FK 294(r)		76 mm divizionnaya pushka obr. 1902	Russian Empire	
7.62 cm FK 295/1(r)		76 mm divizionnaya pushka obr. 1902/30	Soviet Union	
7.62 cm FK 295/2(r)		76 mm divizionnaya pushka obr. 1902/30	Soviet Union	
7.62 cm FK 296(r)		76 mm divizionnaya pushka obr. 1936 (F-22)	Soviet Union	
7.62 cm FK 297(r)		76 mm divizionnaya pushka obr. 1939 (USV)	Soviet Union	
7.62 cm FK 298(r)		76 mm divizionnaya pushka obr. 1933	Soviet Union	
	7.62 cm FK 36(r)	7.62 cm FK 36(r)	Soviet Union (German Mod.)	
	7.62 cm FK 39(r)	7.62 cm FK 39(r)	Soviet Union (German Mod.)	
	3.7 cm Flak M39 (r)	37 mm avtomaticheskaya zenitnaya pushka obr. 1939 (61-K)	Soviet Union	
	7.62 cm Flak M31 (r)	76 mm zenitnaya pushka obr. 1931	Soviet Union	
	7.62 cm Flak M38 (r)	76 mm zenitnaya pushka obr. 1938	Soviet Union	
	8.5 cm Flak M39 (r)	85 mm zenitnaya pushka obr. 1939 (52-K)	Soviet Union	
	8.5 cm Flak M44 (r)	85 mm zenitnaya pushka obr. 1944 (KS-1)	Soviet Union	
	8.8 cm Flak M31 (r)	7.62/8.8 cm Flak M31 (r)	Soviet Union (German Mod.)	
	8.8 cm Flak M38 (r)	7.62/8.8 cm Flak M38 (r)	Soviet Union (German Mod.)	
	8.8 cm Flak M39 (r)	8.5/8.8 cm Flak M39 (r)	Soviet Union (German Mod.)	
7.62 cm Geb.K. 293(r)		76 mm gornaya pushka obr. 1909	Russian Empire	
7.62 cm Geb.K. 307(r)		76 mm gornaya pushka obr. 1938	Soviet Union	
3.7 cm IG. 145(r)		37 mm Maklen pushka obr. 1917	United States	
3.7 cm IG. 146(r)		37 mm Transheynaya pushka obr. 1915	Russian Empire	
4.5 cm IH. 186(r)		45 mm Batal'onnaya gaubitsa obr. 1929 (12-K)	Soviet Union	
7.62 cm IG. 289(r)		76 mm polkovaya pushka obr. 1910/13	Soviet Union	
7.62 cm IKH. 290(r)		76 mm polkovaya pushka obr. 1927	Soviet Union	
15.2 cm Kst.K. 456(r)		152mm costal gun M1892	Russian Empire	
	20.3 cm Kst.K L/45 (r)	203 mm coastal gun M1892	Russian Empire	
3.7 cm Pak 158(r)		37 mm Protivotankovaya pushka obr. 1930 (1-K)	Soviet Union	
4.5 cm Pak 184(r)		45 mm Protivotankovaya pushka obr. 1932 (19-K)	Soviet Union	
4.5 cm Pak 184/1(r)		45 mm Protivotankovaya pushka obr. 1937 (53-K)	Soviet Union	
4.5 cm Pak 184/6(r)		45 mm Protivotankovaya pushka obr. 1938 (20-K)	Soviet Union	
	4.5 cm Pak M42 (r)	45 mm Protivotankovaya pushka obr. 1942 (M-42)	Soviet Union	
4.7 cm Pak 196(r)		47 mm Böhler Protivotankovaya pushka obr. 1935	Soviet Union	
5.7 cm Pak 208(r)		57 mm Protivotankovaya pushka obr. 1941 (ZiS-2)	Soviet Union	
	7.62 cm Pak 36(r)	7.62 cm Pak 36(r)	Soviet Union (German Mod.)	
	7.62 cm Pak 39(r)	7.62 cm Pak 39(r)	Soviet Union (German Mod.)	
7.62 cm Rf.G. 299(r)		76 mm batal'onnaya pushka Kurchevskogo (BPK-76)	Soviet Union	

=== (t)/Czechoslovakia ===
Designation		Weapon		Image
Alt. Desig. 1	Alt. Desig. 2	Model	Design Origin	Image
10 cm le.FH. 14/19(t)		10 cm houfnice vz. 14/19	Czechoslovakia	
10 cm le.FH. 30(t)		10 cm houfnice vz. 30	Czechoslovakia	
	15 cm s.FH. M.14 (t)	15 cm hrubá houfnice vz. 14	Austria-Hungary	
15 cm s.FH. 15(t)		15 cm hrubá houfnice vz. 15	Austria-Hungary	
15 cm s.FH. 25(t)		15 cm hrubá houfnice vz. 25	Czechoslovakia	
15 cm s.FH. 37(t)		15 cm hrubá houfnice vz. 37	Czechoslovakia	
7.65 cm FK 5/8(t)		8 cm polní kanón vz. 5/8	Czechoslovakia	
7.65 cm FK 17(t)		8 cm polní kanón vz. 17	Czechoslovakia	
8 cm FK 30(t)		8 cm polní kanón vz. 30	Czechoslovakia	
4.7 cm Flak 37(t)		4.7 cm kanón PL vz. 37	Czechoslovakia	
7.5 cm Flak 37(t)	7.5 cm Flak M.37 (t)	7.5 cm kanón PL vz. 37	Czechoslovakia	
7.65 cm Flak 33(t)		8 cm kanón PL vz. 33	Czechoslovakia	
7.65 cm Flak 37(t)		8 cm kanón PL vz. 37	Czechoslovakia	
8.35 cm Flak 22(t)	8.35 cm Flak M.22 (t)	8.35 cm kanón PL vz. 22	Czechoslovakia	
9 cm Flak 12(t)	9 cm Flak M.12 (t)	9 cm kanón PL vz. 12/20	Czechoslovakia	
10 cm Geb.H. 16(t)		10 cm horský houfnice vz. 16	Austria-Hungary	
10 cm Geb.H. 16/19(t)		10 cm horský houfnice vz. 16/19	Czechoslovakia	
15 cm Geb.H. 18(t)		15 cm horský houfnice vz. 18	Czechoslovakia	
s. 10.5 cm K. 35(t)		10.5 cm hrubý kanón vz. 35	Czechoslovakia	
15.2 cm K. 15/16(t)		15 cm kanón vz. 15/16	Austria-Hungary	
s. 24 cm K. (t)		24 cm kanón vz. 16	Austria-Hungary	
3.7 cm Pak 34(t)		3.7 cm KPÚV vz. 34	Czechoslovakia	
3.7 cm Pak 37(t)		3.7 cm KPÚV vz. 37	Czechoslovakia	
4.7 cm Pak 36(t)	4.7 cm Pak (t)	4.7 cm KPÚV vz. 36	Czechoslovakia	
4.7 cm Pak (K) 36(t)		4 cm Kanón vz. 36	Czechoslovakia	

== Sort by weapon type ==
=== Anti-aircraft guns ===
Designation			Weapon	Cal.^{(cm)}	Captured	Reused	Notes
Num.	Short	Alt.	Weapon	Cal.^{(cm)}	Captured	Reused	Notes
? (b)		2 cm Flak Madsen (b)	C20 DTCA	2	Yes	Yes	
? (d)		2 cm Flak Madsen (d)	20 mm luftværnskanon m/33	2	Yes	Yes	(Note: F.4 Anti-Aircraft Mount.)
? (d)		2 cm Flak Madsen (d)	20 mm luftværnskanon m/37	2	Yes	Yes	(Note: F.7 Anti-Aircraft Mount.)
? (h)		2 cm Flak 28(h)	Kanon Van 2 TL no.1	2	Yes	Yes	
? (h)		2 cm Flak Scotti (h)	Kanon Van 2 TL no.2	2	Unknown	Unknown	
? (i)		2 cm Flak Breda (i)	Cannone-Mitragliera da 20/65 (Breda)	2	Yes	Yes	
? (i)		2 cm Flak Scotti (i)	Cannone-Mitragliera da 20/77 (Scotti)	2	Yes	Yes	
? (f)		2.5 cm Flak Hotchkiss (f) 2.5 cm Flak 38(f)	Mitrailleuse de 25 mm CA M^{le} 1938	2.5	Yes	Yes	
? (f)		2.5 cm Flak Hotchkiss (f) 2.5 cm Flak 39(f)	Mitrailleuse de 25 mm CA M^{le} 1939	2.5	Yes	Yes	
? (i)		3.7 cm Flak Breda (i)	Cannone-Mitragliera da 37/54 (Breda)	3.7	Yes	Yes	
? (r)		3.7 cm Flak M39 (r)	37 mm avtomaticheskaya zenitnaya pushka obr. 1939 (61-K)	3.7	Yes	Yes	
? (b)		4 cm Flak 28(b)	C40 DTCA M35	4	Yes	Yes	
? (e)		4 cm Flak 28(e)	QF 40 mm Mark I	4	Yes	Yes	
? (h)		4 cm Flak 28(h)	Kanon Van 4 TL	4	Yes	Yes	
? (p)		4 cm Flak 28(p)	40 mm armata przeciwlotnicza Bofors wz. 36	4	Yes	Yes	
? (t)		4.7 cm Flak 37(t)	4.7 cm kanón PL vz. 37	4.7	Yes	Yes	
? (b)		7.5 cm Flak (b)	C75 DTCA M27	7.5	Yes	Unknown	
? (b)		7.5 cm Flak Vickers M.35 (b)	C75 DTCA M32	7.5	Yes	Yes	
? (d)		7.5 cm Flak Vickers M.35 (d)	75 mm lange luftværnskanon m/32	7.5	Yes	Yes	
? (e)		7.5 cm Flak Vickers (e)	QF 3-in. 20cwt AA	7.5	Yes	Yes	
? (f)		7.5 cm Flak M.17/34 (f)	Canon de 75 mm CA M^{le} 17/34	7.5	Yes	Yes	
? (f)		7.5 cm Flak M.22-24 (f)	Canon de 75 mm CA M^{le} 22/24	7.5	Yes	Yes	
? (f)		7.5 cm Flak M.30 (f)	Canon de 75 mm CA M^{le} 30	7.5	Yes	Yes	
? (f)		7.5 cm Flak M.32 (f)	Canon de 75 mm CA M^{le} 32	7.5	Yes	Yes	
? (f)		7.5 cm Flak M.36 (f)	Canon de 75 mm CA M^{le} 36	7.5	Yes	Yes	
? (f)		7.5 cm Flak M.33 (f)	Canon de 75 mm CA M^{le} 33	7.5	Yes	Yes	
? (h)		7.5 cm Flak Vickers M.35 (h)	Kanon Van 7.5 TL 1 no.1	7.5	Yes	Yes	
264/1(i)	7.5 cm Flak 264/1(i)		Cannone da 75/27 A.V.	7.5	Yes	Yes	
264/2(i)	7.5 cm Flak 264/2(i)		Cannone da 75/27 C.K.	7.5	Yes	Yes	
264/3(i)	7.5 cm Flak 264/3(i)		Cannone da 75/46 C.A. modello 34	7.5	Yes	Yes	
264/4(i)	7.5 cm Flak 264/4(i)		Cannone da 75/46 C.A. modello 40	7.5	Yes	Yes	
? (t)		7.5 cm Flak 37(t) 7.5 cm Flak M.37 (t)	7.5 cm kanón PL vz. 37	7.5	Yes	Yes	
266/1(i)	7.62 cm Flak 266/1(i)		Cannone da 76/40 C.A.	7.62	Yes	Yes	
266/2(i)	7.62 cm Flak 266/2(i)		Cannone da 76/40 C.A. modificata 1935	7.62	Yes	Yes	
266/3(i)	7.62 cm Flak 266/3(i)		Cannone da 76/45 C.A.	7.62	Yes	Yes	
? (r)		7.62 cm Flak M31 (r)	76 mm zenitnaya pushka obr. 1931	7.62	Yes	Yes	
? (r)		7.62 cm Flak M38 (r)	76 mm zenitnaya pushka obr. 1938	7.62	Yes	Yes	
268/1(i)	7.65 cm Flak 268/1(i)		Cannone da 77/28 C.A.	7.65	Yes	Yes	
? (t)		7.65 cm Flak 33(t)	8 cm kanón PL vz. 33	7.65	Yes	Yes	
? (t)		7.65 cm Flak 37(t)	8 cm kanón PL vz. 37	7.65	Yes	Yes	
? (t)		8.35 cm Flak 22(t) 8.35 cm Flak M.22 (t)	8.35 cm kanón PL vz. 22	8.35	Yes	Yes	
? (r)		8.5 cm Flak M39 (r)	85 mm zenitnaya pushka obr. 1939 (52-K)	8.5	Yes	Yes	
? (r)		8.5 cm Flak M44 (r)	85 mm zenitnaya pushka obr. 1944 (KS-1)	8.5	Yes	Yes	
? (r)		8.8 cm Flak M31 (r)	7.62/8.8 cm Flak M31 (r)	8.8	Modified	Yes	(Note: Re-bored to use 88 mm ammunition.)
? (r)		8.8 cm Flak M38 (r)	7.62/8.8 cm Flak M38 (r)	8.8	Modified	Yes	
? (r)		8.8 cm Flak M39 (r)	8.5/8.8 cm Flak M39 (r)	8.8	Modified	Yes	
? (f)		9 cm Flak M.39 (f)	Canon de 90 mm CA M^{le} 39	9	Yes	Unknown	
309/1(i)	9 cm Flak 309/1(i)	9 cm Flak 41(i)	Cannone da 90/53	9	Yes	Yes	
? (t)		9 cm Flak 12(t) 9 cm Flak M.12 (t)	9 cm kanón PL vz. 12/20	9	Yes	Yes	
? (e)		9.4 cm Flak Vickers M.39 (e)	QF 3.7-in. AA	9.4	Yes	Unknown	
? (i)		10.2 cm Flak (i)	Cannone da 102/35 modello 1914	10.2	Yes	Yes	

=== Anti-tank guns and recoilless rifles ===
Designation			Weapon	Cal.^{(cm)}	Captured	Reused	Notes
Num.	Short	Alt.	Weapon	Cal.^{(cm)}	Captured	Reused	Notes
112(f)	2.5 cm Pak 112(f)		25 mm SA-L M^{le} 34	2.5	Yes	Yes	
113(f)	2.5 cm Pak 113(f)		25 mm SA-L M^{le} 37	2.5	Yes	Yes	
148(a)	3.7 cm Pak 148(a)		37 mm Gun M3 (Carriage M4)	3.7	Yes	Unknown	
153(h)	3.7 cm Pak 153(h)		Pantserafweergeschut van 37 (Rheinmetall)	3.7	Yes	Yes	
154(b)	4 cm Pak 154(b)		QF 2-pdr Mk.IX, X (Carriage Mk.II)	4	Yes	Yes	(Note: Mistakenly attributed to the Belgian Army.)
156(j)	3.7 cm Pak 156(j)	3.7 cm Pak 37(j)	37 mm Škoda M.39 (protivoklopni top)	3.7	Yes	Yes	
157(d)	3.7 cm Pak 157(d)		37 mm fodfolkskanon m/34 (Bofors)	3.7	Yes	Yes	
158(r)	3.7 cm Pak 158(r)		37 mm Protivotankovaya pushka obr. 1930	3.7	Yes	Yes	(Note: Also called the 37 mm 1-K anti-tank gun.)
162(i)	3.7 cm Pak 162(i)		Cannone contracarro da 37/45	3.7	Yes	Yes	
164(d)	3.7 cm Pak 164(d)		37 mm fodfolkskanon m/35 (Madsen) _{Link}	3.7	Yes	Unknown	
? (p)		3.7 cm Pak 36(p)	37 mm armata ppanc. wz. 36	3.7	Yes	Yes	
? (t)		3.7 cm Pak 34(t)	3.7 cm KPÚV vz. 34	3.7	Yes	Yes	
? (t)		3.7 cm Pak 37(t)	3.7 cm KPÚV vz. 37	3.7	Yes	Yes	
177(i)	4.7 cm Pak 177(i)		Cannone controcarro da 47/32	4.7	Yes	Yes	
179(j)	4.7 cm Pak 179(j)	4.7 cm Pak 36(j)	47 mm Škoda M.36 (protivoklopni top)	4.7	Yes	Yes	
181(f)	4.7 cm Pak 181(f)		47 mm SA M^{le} 1937	4.7	Yes	Yes	
183(f)	4.7 cm Pak 183(f)		47 mm SA M^{le} 1939	4.7	Unknown	No	
184(r)	4.5 cm Pak 184(r)		45 mm Protivotankovaya pushka obr. 1932	4.5	Yes	Yes	
184/1(r)	4.5 cm Pak 184/1(r)		45 mm Protivotankovaya pushka obr. 1937	4.5	Yes	Yes	
184/6(r)	4.5 cm Pak 184/6(r)		45 mm Protivotankovaya pushka obr. 1938	4.5	Yes	Yes	(Note: Mounted on a makeshift box-trail carriage.)
? (r)		4.5 cm Pak M42 (r)	45 mm Protivotankovaya pushka obr. 1942	4.5	Yes	Yes	
185(b)	4.7 cm Pak 185(b)		C.47 F.R.C. Mod.31	4.7	Yes	Yes	
187(h)	4.7 cm Pak 187(h)		Pantserafweergeschut van 47 (Böhler)	4.7	Yes	Yes	(Note: L/32 barrel (32 caliber length).)
188(h)	4.7 cm Pak 188(h)		Pantserafweergeschut van 47 (Rheinmetall)	4.7	Unknown	Unknown	(Note: Described as 4,7 cm anti-tank gun made by Rheinmetall. Could just be a 47 mm Böhler gun with a L/39 barrel and a gun shield from the Pak 36.)
192(e)	4 cm Pak 192(e)		QF 2-pdr Mk.IX, X (Carriage Mk.II)	4	Yes	Yes	
196(r)	4.7 cm Pak 196(r)		47 mm Böhler Protivotankovaya pushka obr. 1935	4.7	Yes	Yes	(Note: Captured from Latvia after the occupation of the Baltic in 1940.)
? (ö)		4.7 cm Pak 35/36(ö)	4.7 cm PaK 35/36(ö)	4.7	Yes	Yes	(Note: 47 mm Böhler gun with a L/35.6 barrel.)
? (t)		4.7 cm Pak 36(t) 4.7 cm Pak (t)	4.7 cm KPÚV vz. 36	4.7	Yes	Yes	
? (t)		4.7 cm Pak (K) 36(t)	4 cm Kanón vz. 36	4.7	Yes	Unknown	
202(a)	5.7 cm Pak 202(a)	5.7 cm Pak M1 (a) auf Laf. M1A3 (a)	57 mm Gun M1 (Carriage M1A3)	5.7	Yes	Yes	
208(i)	5.7 cm Pak 208(i)		Cannone controcarro da 57/43 Modello 1887	5.7	Yes	Unknown	
208(r)	5.7 cm Pak 208(r)		57 mm anti-tank gun M1943 (ZiS-2)	5.7	Yes	Yes	
209(e)	5.7 cm Pak 209(e)		QF 6-pdr Mk II (Carriage Mk I, IA, II)	5.7	Yes	Yes	(Note: L/43 barrel (43 caliber length).)
209(e)	5.7 cm Pak 209(e)		QF 6-pdr Mk IV (Carriage Mk I, IA, II)	5.7	Yes	Yes	(Note: L/50 barrel (50 caliber length).)
? (a)		7.62 cm Pak M5 (a) auf Laf. M1 (a)	3-inch Gun M5 (Carriage M1)	7.62	No	No	
? (a)		7.62 cm Pak M5 (a) auf Laf. M6 (a)	3-inch Gun M5 (Carriage M6)	7.62	Possible	No	
? (r)		7.62 cm Pak 36(r)	7.62 cm Pak 36(r)	7.62	Modified	Yes	(Note: Converted 76 mm F-22 gun.)
? (r)		7.62 cm Pak 39(r)	7.62 cm Pak 39(r)	7.62	Modified	Yes	(Note: Converted 76 mm USV gun.)
299(r)	7.62 cm Rf.G. 299(r)		76 mm batal'onnaya pushka Kurchevskogo (BPK-76)	7.62	Yes	Yes	
? (a)		9 cm Pak T8 (a)	90 mm Gun T8 (Carriage T5E2)	9	No	No	

=== Artillery guns ===
Designation			Weapon	Cal.^{(cm)}	Captured	Reused	Notes
Num.	Short	Alt.	Weapon	Cal.^{(cm)}	Captured	Reused	Notes
231(f)	7.5 cm FK 231(f)		Canon de 75 M^{le} 97	7.5	Yes	Yes	
231(f)	7.5 cm FK 231(f)		Canon de 75 M^{le} 97/38	7.5	Yes	Yes	
232(f)	7.5 cm FK 232(f)		Canon de 75 M^{le} 97/33	7.5	Yes	Unknown	
233(b)	7.5 cm FK 233(b)		Canon de 75 M^{le} GP I	7.5			
234(b)	7.5 cm FK 234(b)		Canon de 75 M^{le} GP II	7.5			
235(b)	7.5 cm FK 235(b)		Canon de 75 M^{le} TR	7.5			
236(b)	7.5 cm FK 236(b)		Canon de 75 M^{le} GP III	7.5			
237(i)	7.5 cm FK 237(i)		Cannone da 75/27 modello 06	7.5			
240(d)	7.5 cm FK 240(d)		75 mm feltkanon m/03	7.5			
241(h)	7.5 cm FK 241(h)		Stuk van 7-veld (OM.04)	7.5	Yes	Unknown	
242(h)	7.5 cm FK 242(h)		Stuk van 7-veld (NM.10)	7.5	Yes	Unknown	
243(h)	7.5 cm FK 243(h)		Stuk van 7-veld (M.02/03)	7.5	Yes	Unknown	
243(h)	7.5 cm FK 243(h)		Stuk van 7-veld (M.02/04)	7.5	Yes	Unknown	
244(i)	7.5 cm FK 244(i)		Cannone da 75/27 modello 11	7.5			
245(i)	7.5 cm le.FK 245(i)		Cannone da 75/27 modello 12	7.5			
246(n)	7.5 cm FK 246(n)		7.5 cm Feltkanon m/01	7.5			
248(i)	7.5 cm FK 248(i)		Cannone da 75/32 modello 37	7.5			
249(j)	7.5 cm FK 249(j)		75 mm M.12 (Terenska Topova)	7.5			
261(e)	7.6 cm FK 261(e)		QF 13-pdr Mk II (Carriage 13-pdr Mk.I)	7.6			
267(g)	7.5 cm FK 267(g)		Bethlehem Field Gun; 75 mm (model 1917)	7.5			
250(r)	7.62 cm FK. 250(r)		76.2 mm field gun M1938/39 (L-11)	7.62			(Note: Field modified using a ZiS-3 split-trail carriage.)
271(e)	8.38 cm FK 271(e)		QF 18-pdr Mk I, I* (Carriage Mark I, I*, I**)	8.38			
271(e)	8.38 cm FK 271(e)		QF 18-pdr Mk II, II* (Carriage Mark I, I*, I**)	8.38			
271(e)	8.38 cm FK 271(e)		QF 18-pdr Mk II, II* (Carriage Mark II, IIPA)	8.38			
272(e)	8.38 cm FK 272(e)		QF 18-pdr Mk IV (Carriage Mark III, IIITR)	8.38			
272(e)	8.38 cm FK 272(e)		QF 18-pdr Mk IV (Carriage Mark IV, IVR)	8.38			
273(e)	8.38 cm FK 273(e)		QF 18-pdr Mk IV (Carriage Mark V, VR)	8.38			
280(e)	8.76 cm FK 280(e)		QF 25-pdr Mk II (Carriage 25-pdr Mark I)	8.76			
281(e)	8.76 cm FK 281(e)		QF 25-pdr Mk I (Carriage 18-pdr Mark IV)	8.76			
282(e)	8.76 cm FK 282(e)		QF 25-pdr Mk I (Carriage 18-pdr Mark V)	8.76			
284(j)	7.5 cm FK. 284(j)		75 mm M.07 (Terenska top)	7.5			
284(j)	7.5 cm FK. 284(j)		75 mm M.07a (Terenska top)	7.5			
287(g)	8.5 cm KH. 287(g)		Schneider Field Gun; 85 mm (model 1927)	8.5	Yes	Unknown	
288(r)	7.62 cm FK 288(r)		76 mm divizionnaya pushka obr. 1942 (ZiS-3)	7.62			
288/1(r)	7.62 cm FK 288/1(r)		76 mm divizionnaya pushka obr. 1942 (ZiS-3)	7.62			
294(r)	7.62 cm FK 294(r)		76 mm divizionnaya pushka obr. 1902	7.62			
295/1(r)	7.62 cm FK 295/1(r)		76 mm divizionnaya pushka obr. 1902/30	7.62			(Note: L/30 barrel (30 caliber length).)
295/2(r)	7.62 cm FK 295/2(r)		76 mm divizionnaya pushka obr. 1902/30	7.62			(Note: L/40 barrel (40 caliber length).)
296(r)	7.62 cm FK 296(r)		76 mm divizionnaya pushka obr. 1936 (F-22)	7.62			
297(r)	7.62 cm FK 297(r)		76 mm divizionnaya pushka obr. 1939 (USV)	7.62			
298(r)	7.62 cm FK 298(r)		76 mm divizionnaya pushka obr. 1933	7.62			
300(i)	7.65 cm FK 300(i)		Cannone da 77/28 modello 5/8	7.65			
300(j)	7.65 cm FK 300(j)		80 mm Škoda M.05/08 (Terenska top)	7.65			
303(j)	7.65 cm FK 303(j)		80 mm Škoda M.17 (Terenska top)	7.65			
304(j)	7.65 cm FK 304(j)		80 mm Škoda M.28 (Terenska top)	7.65			
305(r)	8.38 cm FK 305(r)		84 mm divisional gun M1918	8.38			(Note: The gun model is the QF 18-pdr Mk IV (Carriage Mark V).)
310(g)	10.5 cm K. 310(g)		Schneider Field Gun; 105 mm (model 1925)	10.5	Yes	Unknown	
320(i)	10.5 cm K. 320(i)		Cannone da 105/32	10.5			
321(d)	10.5 cm K. 321(d)		105 mm feltkanon m/30	10.5			
321(j)	10.5 cm K. 321(j)		105 mm Schneider M.25 (Teški top)	10.5			(Note: (Most likely) misattributed to the Greek army.)
331(f)	10.5 cm K. 331(f)		Canon de 105 M^{le} 13 Schneider	10.5			
332(f)	s. 10.5 cm K. 332(f)		Canon de 105 L M^{le} 36; Schneider	10.5			
332(h)	s. 10.5 cm K. 332(h)		?	10.5			
333(b)	10.5 cm K. 333(b)		Canon de 105 M^{le} 13	10.5			
334(h)	10.5 cm K. 334(h)		Stuk van 10-veld (Krupp) _{Link}	10.5			
335(h)	10.5 cm K. 335(h)		Stuk van 10-veld (Bofors)	10.5			
337(n)	10.5 cm FK. 337(n)		10.5 cm feltkanon m/04	10.5			
338(i)	10.5 cm K. 338(i)		Cannone da 105/28	10.5			
338(j)	10.5 cm FK 338(j)		105 mm Schneider M.13 (Terenska top)	10.5			
339(j)	10.5 cm K. 339(j)		105 mm Škoda M.36 (Teški top)	10.5			
340(g)	10.5 cm K. 340(g)		Schneider Field Gun; 105 mm (model 1927)	10.5			
342/1(a)	7.5 cm FK 342/1(a)		75 mm Field Gun M1916 (Carriage M1916)	7.5			
342/2(a)	7.5 cm FK 342/2(a)		75 mm Field Gun M1916MI (Carriage M1916A1)	7.5			
344(a)	7.5 cm FK 344(a)		75 mm Field Gun M1917 (Carriage M1917)	7.5			
345(a)	7.5 cm FK 345(a)		75 mm Field Gun M1897 (Carriage M2A2)	7.5			
? (p)		7.5 cm FK 97(p)	75 mm Armata wz. 1897	7.5	Yes	Yes	(Note: Also on an anti-air mount)
? (p)		7.5 cm FK 02/26(p)	75 mm Armata wz. 02/26	7.5	Yes	Yes	
? (p)		7.62 cm FK 02(p)	76.2 mm Armata wz. 1902	7.62	Yes	Unknown	
? (r)		7.62 cm FK 36(r)	7.62 cm FK 36(r)	7.62	Modified	Yes	
? (r)		7.62 cm FK 39(r)	7.62 cm FK 39(r)	7.62	Modified	Yes	
? (ö)		7.65 cm FK 5/8(ö)	8 cm Feldkanone M. 5/8	7.65	Yes	Yes	
? (ö)		7.65 cm FK 17(ö)	8 cm Feldkanone M. 17	7.65	Yes	Yes	
? (ö)		7.65 cm FK 18(ö)	8 cm Feldkanone M. 18	7.65	Yes	Yes	
? (t)		7.65 cm FK 5/8(t)	8 cm polní kanón vz. 5/8	7.65	Yes	Yes	
? (t)		7.65 cm FK 17(t)	8 cm polní kanón vz. 17	7.65	Yes	Yes	
? (t)		8 cm FK 30(t)	8 cm polní kanón vz. 30	7.65	Yes	Yes	
? (ö)		10 cm K. 17/04(ö)	10 cm Kanone 17/04	10	Yes	Unknown	
? (p)		10.5 cm K. 13(p)	105 mm Armata wz. 13	10.5	Yes	Yes	
? (p)		10.5 cm K. 29(p)	105 mm Armata wz. 29	10.5	Yes	Yes	
348(r)	10.5 cm K. 348(r)		105 mm gun M1922 (Vickers)	10.5			
349(r)	10.5 cm K. 349(r)		?	10.5			
? (t)		s. 10.5 cm K. 35(t)	10.5 cm hruby kanón vz. 35	10.5	Yes	Yes	
350(r)	10.7 cm K. 350(r)		107mm field gun M1905 (Krupp)	10.7			(Note: The gun was designated as the 10.7 cm Field Gun M1908/10 (Krupp).)
351(r)	10.7 cm K. 351(r)		107 mm gun M1910	10.7			
352(r)	10.7 cm K. 352(r)		107 mm gun M1910/30	10.7			
353(r)	10.7 cm K. 353(r)		107 mm divisional gun M1940 (M-60)	10.7			
365(e)	11.4 cm K. 365(e)		BL 4.5-in. Medium Gun Mk I (Carriage 60-pdr Mk IV, IVP)	11.4			
? (t)		15.2 cm K. 15/16(t)	15 cm Autokanone M. 15/16	15.2	Yes	Yes	
? (t)		s. 24 cm K. (t)	24 cm kanón vz. 16	24	Yes	Yes	

==== With number designation ====
Num.	Short designation	Weapon	Cal. (cm)	Image	Notes
370(b)	12 cm K. 370(b)	Canon de 120 L M^{le} 31	12		
370(i)	12 cm K. 370(i)	Cannone da 120/25	12		
371(f)	12 cm K. 371(f)	Canon de 120 L M^{le} 78	12		
372(i)	12 cm K. 372(i)	Cannone da 120/40 A	12		
373(i)	12 cm K. 373(i)	Cannone da 120/21	12		
381(e)	12.7 cm K. 382(e)	BL 60-pdr gun Mk I (Carriage Mk.I, II, III)	12.7		
382(e)	12.7 cm K. 382(e)	BL 60-pdr gun Mk II (Carriage Mk.IV, IVR)	12.7		
382(e)	12.7 cm K. 382(e)	BL 60-pdr gun Mk II (Carriage Mk.IVP)	12.7		
390/1(r)	12.2 cm K. 390/1(r)	122 mm gun M1931 (A-19)	12.2		
390/2(r)	12.2 cm K. 390/2(r)	122 mm gun M1931/37 (A-19)	12.2		
392(a)	12 cm K. 392(a)	4.7-inch Gun M1906 (Carriage M1906)	12		
397(a)	12 cm K. 397(a)	5-in. Gun M1897 (Carriage M1918)	12.7		
403(j)	15 cm K. 403(j)	150 mm M.28 (Topova)	15		
405(f)	14.5 cm K. 405(f)	Canon de 145 L M^{le} 1916; Saint-Chamond	14.5		
406(i)	15 cm K. 406(i)	Cannone da 149/35 A	15		
408(i)	15 cm K. 408(i)	Cannone da 149/40 modello 35	15		
409(i)	15 cm K. 409(i)	Cannone da 149/35	15		
410(i)	15.2 cm K. 410(i)	Cannone da 152/37	15.2		
411(i)	15.2 cm K. 411(i)	Cannone da 152/45; Modello 1911	15.2		
416(b) 416(f)	15.5 cm K. 416(b) 15.5 cm K. 416(f)	Canon de 155 L modèle 1917 Canon de 155 L modèle 1917 Schneider	15.5		
417(f)	15.5 cm K. 417(f)	Canon de 155 GPF-CA	15.5		
418(f)	15.5 cm K. 418(f)	Canon de 155 GPF	15.5		
419(f)	15.5 cm K. 419(f)	Canon de 155 GPF-T	15.5		
420(f) 420(i)	15.5 cm K. 420(f) 15.5 cm K. 420(i)	Canon de 155 L M^{le} 16; Saint-Chamond	15.5		
421(f)	15.5 cm K. 421(f)	Canon de 155 L M^{le} 77 de Bange	15.5		
422(f)	15.5 cm K. 422(f)	Canon de 155 L M^{le} 77/14; Schneider	15.5		
424(f)	15.5 cm K. 424(f)	Canon de 155 L M^{le} 32; Schneider _{Link}	15.5		
425(f)	15.5 cm K. 425(f)	Canon de 155 L M^{le} 18; Schneider	15.5		
429(b)	15 cm K. 429(b)	Canon de 150 L/43	15		
431(b)	15.5 cm K. 431(b)	Canon de 155 L M^{le} 17; Schneider	15.5		
432(b)	15.5 cm K. 432(b)	Canone de 155 L M^{le} 24	15.5		
433/1(r)	15.2 cm KH. 433/1(r)	152 mm howitzer-gun M1937 (ML-20)	15.2		
433/2(r)	15.2 cm KH. 433/2(r)	152 mm gun M1910/34	15.2		
434(r)	15.2 cm K. 434(r)	152 mm siege gun M1904	15.2		
435(r)	15.2 cm K. 435(r)	152 mm siege gun M1910	15.2		
436(e)	15.2 cm K. 436(e)	BL 6-inch gun Mk XIX (Carriage Mk VIII)	15.2		
437(e)	15.2 cm K. 437(e)	BL 6-inch 30cwt howitzer	15.2		
438(r)	15.2 cm K. 438(r)	152 mm gun M1910/30	15.2		
440(r)	15.2 cm K. 440(r)	152 mm gun M1935 (Br-2)	15.2		
456(r)	15.2 cm Kst.K. 456(r)	152mm costal gun M1892	15.2		
481(a)	15.2 cm s.K. 481(a)	6-inch gun M1917 (Carriage Mark VIIIA)	15.2		
485(f)	19.4 cm K. 485(f) auf Sfl.	Canon de 194 GPF sur affût chenilles Saint-Chamond	19.4		
485(f)	19.4 cm K. 485(f)	Canon de 194 GPF (Stationary mount)	19.4		
487(a)	15.5 cm s.K. 487(a)	155 mm Gun M1918 (Carriage M1918)	15.5		
487(a)	15.5 cm s.K. 487(a)	155 mm Gun M1918MI (Carriage M3)	15.5		
487(a)	15.5 cm s.K. 487(a) auf Sfl.	155 mm Gun M1918 (Christie Motor Carriage; M1920)	15.5		
488(a)	15.5 cm s.K. 488(a)	155 mm Gun M1 (Carriage M1)	15.5		(Note: The gun was designated as the 155 mm Field Gun T2.)
489(a)	15.5 cm s.K. 489(a)	155 mm Gun M1A1 (Carriage M1A1)	15.5		(Note: The gun was designated as the 155 mm Field Gun T4.)
521(r)	21 cm K. 521(r)	210 mm gun M1939 (Br-17)	21		
522(a)	17.8 cm s.K. 522(a)	7-inch Gun Mark 2 (Tractor Mount Mark V)	17.8		
532(f)	22 cm K. 532(f)	Canon de 220 L M^{le} 17; Schneider	22		
556(f)	24 cm K. 556(f)	Canon de 240 L M^{le} 84/17; Saint-Chamond	24		
559(r)	24 cm K. 559(r)	?	24		

=== Artillery howitzers ===
Designation			Weapon	Cal.^{(cm)}	Captured	Reused	Notes
Num.	Short	Alt.	Weapon	Cal.^{(cm)}	Captured	Reused	Notes
		10 cm le.FH. 14/19(t)	10 cm houfnice vz. 14/19	10	Yes	Yes	
		10 cm le.FH. 30(t)	10 cm houfnice vz. 30	10	Yes	Yes	
		15 cm s.FH. M.14 (t)	15 cm hrubá houfnice vz. 14	15	Yes	Yes	
		15 cm s.FH. 15(t)	15 cm hrubá houfnice vz. 15	15	Yes	Yes	
		15 cm s.FH. 25(t)	15 cm hrubá houfnice vz. 25	15	Unknown	Unknown	
		15 cm s.FH. 37(t)	15 cm hrubá houfnice vz. 37	15	Yes	Yes	

=== Costal artillery ===
Designation			Weapon	Cal.^{(cm)}	Captured	Reused	Notes
Num.	Short	Alt.	Weapon	Cal.^{(cm)}	Captured	Reused	Notes
? (f)		9.5 cm Kst.K. (f)	Canon de 95 modèle 1875 Lahitolle	9.5			
393(r)	12 cm Kst.K. 393(r)		120 mm coastal gun M1892	12			
393(r)	12 cm Kst.K. 393(r)		120 mm coastal gun M1905	12			
? (r)		20.3 cm Kst.K L/45 (r)	203 mm coastal gun M1892	20.3			
731(e)	38 cm Kst.K 731(e)		BL 15-in. coastal gun Mk I	38			
? (h)		24 cm SK C94 (h) in DrhL (h)	24 cm SK L/40 Krupp C/94	24	Yes	Unknown	
? (f)		34 cm SK M.12 (f) in DrhL (f)	340 mm/45 Modèle 1912	34	Yes	Yes	

=== Fortress artillery ===
Designation			Weapon	Cal.^{(cm)}	Captured	Reused	Notes
Num.	Short	Alt.	Weapon	Cal.^{(cm)}	Captured	Reused	Notes
		6.5 cm Fest.Pak M.02 (f)	Canon de 65 mm M^{le} 1902	6.5	Yes	Yes	

=== Infantry guns/howitzers ===
Designation			Weapon	Cal.^{(cm)}	Captured	Reused	Notes
Num.	Short	Alt.	Weapon	Cal.^{(cm)}	Captured	Reused	Notes
142(j)	3.7 cm IK. 142(j)		37 mm Puteaux M.16 (Pešadijski top)	3.7			
145(r)	3.7 cm IG. 145(r)		37 mm McClean gun M1917	3.7			
146(r)	3.7 cm IG. 146(r)		37 mm trench gun M1915	3.7			
147(a)	3.7 cm IK. 147(a)		37 mm infantry gun M1916	3.7			
152(f)	3.7 cm IK. 152(f)		Canon d'I de 37 M^{le} 16 TRP	3.7			
186(r)	4.5 cm IH. 186(r)		45 mm battalion howitzer M1929 (12-K)	4.5			
260(b)	7.6 cm IG. 260(b)		Canon de 76 FRC	7.6			
289(r)	7.62 cm IG. 289(r)		76 mm regimental gun M1910/13	7.62			
290(r)	7.62 cm IKH. 290(r)		76 mm regimental gun M1927	7.62			
302(e)	9.4 cm IH. 302(e)		QF 3.7-inch howitzer Mk I (Carriage Mk IVP)	9.4			

=== Mountain guns/howitzers ===
Designation			Weapon	Cal.^{(cm)}	Captured	Reused	Notes
Num.	Short	Alt.	Weapon	Cal.^{(cm)}	Captured	Reused	Notes
221(f)	6.5 cm Geb.K. 221(f)		Canon de 65 M M^{le} 06	6.5	Yes	Yes	
222(j)	6.5 cm Geb.K. 222(j)		65 mm Schneider M.06 (Brdski top)	6.5	Yes	Yes	
228(b)	7.5 cm Geb.K. 228(b)		Canon de 75 M^{le} 34	7.5	Yes	Unknown	
237(f)	7.5 cm Geb.K. 237(f)		Canon de 75 M M^{le} 19	7.5	Yes	Yes	
238(f)	7.5 cm Geb.K. 238(f)		Canon de 75 M M^{le} 28	7.5	Yes	Yes	
247(n)	7.5 cm Geb.K. 247(n)		7.5 cm Gebirgskanone m/11	7.5	Yes	Unknown	
259(i)	7.5 cm Geb.K. 259(i)		Obice da 75/13	7.5	Yes	Yes	
259(j)	7.5 cm Geb.K. 259(j)		75 mm Škoda M.15 (Brdski Topova)	7.5	Yes	Yes	
284(j)	7.5 cm Geb.K. 284(j)		75 mm M.07 (Brdski top)	7.5	Unknown	Unknown	
284(j)	7.5 cm Geb.K. 284(j)		75 mm M.07a (Brdski top)	7.5	Unknown	Unknown	
283(j)	7.5 cm Geb.K. 283(j)		75 mm Schneider M.19 (Brdski top)	7.5	Yes	Yes	
285(j)	7.5 cm Geb.K. 285(j)		75 mm Škoda M.28 (Brdski top)	7.5	Yes	Yes	
293(r)	7.62 cm Geb.K. 293(r)		76 mm mountain gun M1909	7.62	Yes	Unknown	
307(r)	7.62 cm Geb.K. 307(r)		76 mm gornaya pushka obr. 1938	7.62	Yes	Unknown	
		10 cm Geb.H. 16(t)	10 cm horský houfnice vz. 16	10	Yes	Yes	
		10 cm Geb.H. 16/19(t)	10 cm horský houfnice vz. 16/19	10	Yes	Yes	
		15 cm Geb.H. 18(t)	15 cm horský houfnice vz. 18	15	Yes	Unknown	

== Field, infantry and mountain howitzwer ==
=== With number designation ===
Num.	Short designation	Weapon	Cal. (cm)	Image	Notes
254(i)	7.5 cm Geb.H. 254(i)	Obice da 75/18 modello 34	7.5		
255(i)	7.5 cm le.FH. 255(i)	Obice da 75/18 modello 35	7.5		
301(e)	9.4 cm Geb.H. 301(e)	QF 3.7-inch howitzer Mk I (Carriage Mk I)	9.4		
312(a)	7.5 cm Geb.H. 312(a)	75 mm Pack Howitzer (Vickers)	7.5		
313(a)	7.5 cm Geb.H. 313(a)	75mm Pack Howitzer M1 (Carriage M1)	7.5		
315(i)	10 cm le.FH. 315(i)	Obice da 100/17 modello 14	10		
315(j)	10 cm le.FH. 315(j)	10 cm M.14 (Terenska Haubica)	10		
316(i)	10 cm Geb.H. 316(i)	Obice da 100/17	10		
316(j)	10 cm le.FH. 316(j)	10 cm M.14/19 (Terenska Haubica)	10		
317(j) 317/1(j)	10 cm le.FH. 317(j) 10 cm Geb.H. 317/1(j)	10 cm M.28 (Haubica)	10		
318(g)	10 cm le.FH. 318(g)	Škoda field howitzer 100 mm (Model 14/19)	10		
322(f)	10.5 cm le.Geb.H. 322(f)	Canon C de 105 M M^{le} 19 Schneider	10.5		
323(f)	10.5 cm le.Geb.H. 323(f)	Canon C de 105 M M^{le} 28 Schneider	10.5		
324(f)	10.5 cm le.FH. 324(f)	Canon de 105 C M^{le} 34 Schneider	10.5		
325(f)	10.5 cm le.FH. 325(f)	Canon de 105 C M^{le} 35 B	10.5		
326(i)	10.5 cm le.FH. 326(i)	Obice da 105/14	10.5		
327(b)	10.5 cm le.FH. 327(b)	Obusier de 105 GP	10.5		
329(j)	10.5 cm le.Geb.H. 329(j)	105 mm M.19 (Planinska Haubica)	10.5		
343(f)	10.5 cm le.Geb.H. 343(f)	Canon C de 105 M M^{le} 09 Schneider	10.5		
346(a)	7.5 cm le.FH. 346(a)	75 mm Pack Howitzer M1 (Carriage M3A1)	7.5		(Note: The gun was designated as the 75 mm Field Howitzer T1.)
360(a)	10.5 cm le.FH. 360(a)	105 mm Howitzer M2 (Carriage M2)	10.5		(Note: The gun was designated as the: 105 mm Field Howitzer T1 in Laf. T2, 105 mm Field Howitzer T1 in Laf. T3, 105 mm Field Howitzer M1 in Laf. M2.)
361(e)	11.4 cm le.FH. 361(e)	QF 4.5-in. howitzer Mk I (Carriage Mk IR)	11.4		
362(r)	11.5 cm le.FH. 362(r)	115 mm howitzer M1910 (English)	11.5		
373(h)	12 cm le.FH. 373(h)	Houwitzer Van 12 Lang 14	12		
375(n)	12 cm le.FH. 375(n)	12 cm felthaubits m/08	12		
376(n)	12 cm le.FH. 376(n)	12 cm felthaubits m/32	12		
377(j)	12 cm le.FH. 377(j)	120 mm M.15 (haubica)	12		
385(r)	12 cm le.FH. 385(r)	120 mm howitzer M1902	12		(Note: Made by Putilov plant in ~1905. Possibly had been mistaken for the 120 mm howitzer Model 1901.)
386(r)	12.2 cm le.FH. 386(r)	122 mm howitzer M1909/37	12.2		
387(r)	12.2 cm le.FH. 387(r)	122 mm howitzer M1910	12.2		
388(r)	12.2 cm le.FH. 388(r)	122 mm howitzer M1910/30	12.2		
396(r)	12.2 cm s.FH. 396(r)	122 mm howitzer M1938 (M-30)	12.2		
400(i) 400/1(i)	15 cm s.FH. 400(i) 15 cm s.FH. 400/1(i)	Obice da 149/12 Modello 14 Obice da 149/12 Modello 14; Modificato	15		
401(i)	15 cm s.FH. 401(i)	Obice da 149/13	15		
402(i) 402/1(i)	15 cm s.FH. 402(i) 15 cm s.FH. 402/1(i)	Obice da 149/12 Modello 18 Obice da 149/12 Modello 18; Modificato	15		
402(j)	15 cm s.FH. 402(j)	150 mm M.36 (Haubica) (Skoda K1)	15		
404(i)	15 cm s.FH. 404(i)	Obice da 149/19 modello 37	15		
406(h)	15 cm s.FH. 406(h)	Houwitzer Van 15 Lang 17	15		
407(h)	15.2 cm s.FH. 407(h)	Houwitzer Van 15 Lang 15	15.2		
409(b)	15 cm s.FH. 409(b)	Obusier de 150	15		
410(b)	15.2 cm s.FH. 410(b)	Obusier de 6"	15.2		
411(e)	15.2 cm s.FH. 411(e)	6-inch Howitzer (?)	15.2		
412(e)	15.2 cm s.FH. 412(e)	BL 6-in. 26cwt howitzer Mk.I (Carriage Mk.IR)	15.2		
412(f)	15.2 cm s.FH. 412(f)	BL 6-in. 26cwt howitzer Mk.I (Carriage Mk.I)	15.2		(Note: Mistakenly attributed to the French Army.)
412(i)	15.2 cm s.FH. 412(i)	Obice da 152/13	15.2		
413(b)	15.5 cm s.FH. 413(b)	Obusier de 155	15.5		
414(f) 414(g) 414(i)	15.5 cm s.FH. 414(f) 15.5 cm s.FH. 414(g) 15.5 cm s.FH. 414(i)	Canon de 155 C M^{le} 17 Schneider Schneider Field Howitzer; 155 mm (model 1917) Obice da 155/14	15.5		
415(f)	15.5 cm s.FH. 415(f)	Canon de 155 C M^{le} 15 St. Chamond	15.5		
427/1(j)	15.5 cm s.FH. 427/1(j)	Canon de 155 C M^{le} 17 Schneider	15.5		
427/2(j)	15.5 cm s.FH. 427/2(j)	Canon de 155 C M^{le} 15 Schneider	15.5		
443(r)	15.2 cm s.FH. 443(r)	152 mm howitzer M1938 (M-10)	15.2		
444(r)	15.2 cm s.FH. 444(r)	152 mm Vickers howitzer M1916	15.2		
445(r)	15.2 cm s.FH. 445(r)	152 mm howitzer M1909/30	15.2		
446(r)	15.2 cm s.FH. 446(r)	152 mm howitzer M1910/37	15.2		
449(r)	15.2 cm s.FH. 449(r)	152 mm Schneider howitzer M1917	15.2		
461(d)	15 cm s.FH. 461(d)	149 mm Lang Haubitse M.29	15		
469(d)	15.5 cm s.FH. 469(d)	155 mm Lang Haubitse M.29	15.5		(Note: Re-bored to use 155 mm ammunition.)
492(a)	15.5 cm s.FH. 492(a)	155 mm Howitzer M1918 (Carriage M1918)	15.5		
493(a)	15.5 cm s.FH. 493(a)	155 mm Howitzer T1 (Carriage T1)	15.5		

=== Without number designation ===
Short designation	Weapon	Cal. (cm)	Image	Notes
12 cm FH. M/15 (n)	12 cm felthaubits m/15	12		
10 cm le.FH. 14/19(p)	100 mm haubica wz. 1914/19	10		
15.5 cm s.FH. 17(p)	155 mm haubica wz. 1917	15.5		
10 cm le.FH. 14(ö)	10 cm Feldhaubitze M. 14	10		
10 cm Geb.H. 16(ö)	10 cm Gebirgshaubitze M.16	10		
15 cm s.FH. 14(ö)	15 cm schwere Feldhaubitze M. 14	15		
15 cm s.FH. 15(ö)	15 cm schwere Feldhaubitze M. 15	15		

== Other howitzers ==
- Note: This is a general desgination to a variety of howitzer; except for infantry, mountain, and field howitzers.

=== With number designation ===
Num.	Short Desig.	Weapon	Cal.^{(cm)}	Image	Notes
501(e)	s.H. 501(e)	BL 8-inch howitzer Mk VI (Carriage Mk VI)	20.3		
501(e)	s.H. 501(e)	BL 8-inch howitzer Mk VII (Carriage Mk VII)	20.3		
501(e)	s.H. 501(e)	BL 8-inch howitzer Mk VIII (Carriage Mk VII)	20.3		
502(r)	s.H. 502(r)	203 mm Vickers howitzer M1916	20.3		
503/1(r) 503/2(r)	H. 503/1(r) H. 503/2(r)	203 mm howitzer M1931 (B-4)	20.3		(Note: L/22 barrel (22 caliber length).)
503/3(r) 503/4(r) 503/5(r)	H. 503/3(r) H. 503/4(r) H. 503/5(r)	203 mm howitzer M1931 (B-4)	20.3		(Note: L/25 barrel (25 caliber length).)
519(i)	Mrs. 519(i)	Mortaio da 210/8	21		
520(i)	H. 520(i)	Obice da 210/22	21		
523/1(a)	Mrs. 523/1(a)	8-inch Howitzer M1917 (Mark 6)	20.3		
523/2(a)	Mrs. 523/2(a)	8-inch Howitzer M1918 (Mark 7)	20.3		
523/3(a)	Mrs. 523/3(a)	8-inch Howitzer M1918 (Mark 8½)	20.3		
527(a)	Mrs. 527(a)	8-inch Howitzer M1 (Carriage M1)	20.3		(Note: The gun was designated as the 8-inch Howitzer T2.)
530(b)	Mrs. 530(b)	Mortier Schneider de 9" de seige	22		
531(f)	Mrs. 531(f)	Mortier de 220 TR M^{le} 16 Schneider	22		
538(j)	Mrs. 538(j)	220 mm M.28 (Malter)	22		
545/1(b)	H. 545/1(b)	Mortier de 9.2"	23.4		(Note: The gun model is the BL 9.2-inch howitzer (Vickers Mk I)..)
545/2(b)	H. 545/2(b)	Mortier de 9.2"	23.4		(Note: The gun model is the BL 9.2-inch howitzer (Vickers Mk II)..)
546(e)	H. 546(e)	BL 9.2-inch howitzer Mk I (Carriage, Siege, Mk I)	23.4		
546(e)	H. 546(e)	BL 9.2-inch howitzer Mk II (Carriage, Siege, Mk II)	23.4		
546/1(a)	H. 546/1(a)	BL 9.2-inch howitzer Mk I (Carriage, Siege, Mk I)	23.4		
546/2(a)	H. 546/2(a)	BL 9.2-inch howitzer Mk II (Carriage, Siege, Mk II)	23.4		
548(r)	H. 548(r)	234 mm Vickers Howitzer M1917	23.4		
550/1(a)	s.H. 550/1(a)	234 mm Howitzer M1917 (Carriage M1917)	23.4		
550/2(a)	s.H. 550/2(a)	234 mm Howitzer M1918 (Carriage M1918)	23.4		
561(a)	s.H. 561(a)	240 mm Howitzer M1918	24		
564(r)	H. 564(r)	?	24		
582(i)	Mrs. 582(i)	Mortaio da 260/9 Modello 16	26		
585(f)	Kst.Mrs. 585(f)	Mortier de 270 M^{le} 89 sur affût G	27		
601(f)	Mrs. 601(f)	Mortier de 280 TR M^{le} 14 Schneider	28		
602(f)	Mrs. 602(f) auf Sfl.	Mortier de 280 TR M^{le} 14 Schneider sur affût-chenilles St Chamond	28		
607(r)	H. 607(r)	280 mm Schneider Mortar M1914/15	28		
622(r)	H. 622(r)	305 mm Vickers howitzer M1917	30.5		(Note: ru.Wikipedia link)
623(r)	H. 623(r)	305 mm howitzer M1939 (Br-18)	30.5		
624(i)	H. 624(i)	Obice da 305/17	30.5		
631(e)	H. 631(e)	BL 12-inch howitzer Mk IV (Carriage, Siege, Mk II)	30.5		
632(b)	H. 632(b)	Mortier de 12"	30.5		(Note: The gun model is the BL 12-inch howitzer (Vickers Mk IV)..)
638(j)	Mrs. 638(j)	305 mm M.11 (Malter)	30.5		
639(j)	Mrs. 639(j)	305 mm M.11/30 (Malter)	30.5		
640(i)	Mrs. 640(i)	Mortaio da 305/8 Modello 1911/16	30.5		
641(i)	Mrs. 641(i)	Mortaio da 305/10 Modello 1916	30.5		
710(f)	Mrs. 710(f)	Mortier de 370 M^{le} 14 Filloux	37		
721(i)	s.H. 721(i)	Obice da 380/15	38		
771(i)	s.H. 771(i)	Obice da 420/12	42		

=== Without number designation ===
Short Desig.	Weapon	Cal.^{(cm)}	Image	Notes
Mrs. (p)	220 mm Moździerz wz. 32	22		
Mrs. 18/19(t) kz. (21 cm) Mrs. (t)	21 cm Moždíř vz. 18/19	21		
Mrs. (t)	30.5 cm Moždíř vz.11	30.5		
H. (t)	42 cm houfnice vz. 17	42		

== Mortars ==
=== With number designation ===
Num.	Short Desig.	Weapon	Cal.^{(cm)}	Image	Notes
161(r)	Sp.GrW 161(r)	37 mm Spade Mortar	3.7		
176(i)	GrW 176(i)	Brixia Model 35	4.5		
200(r)	GrW 200(r)	RM-41	5		
201(b)	GrW 201(b)	Lance Grenades de 50 mm DBT	5		
202(e)	GrW 202(e)	SBML 2-inch mortar	5		
203(f)	GrW 203(f)	Lance Grenades de 50 mm modèle 37	5		
205/1(r)	GrW 205/1(r)	RM-38	5		
205/2(r)	GrW 205/2(r)	RM-39	5		
205/3(r)	GrW 205/3(r)	RM-40	5		
210(f)	Fest.GrW 210(f)	Mortier de 50 mm modèle 1935	5		
219(a)	MnW 219(a)	60 mm Mortar M2	6		
225(f)	GrW 225(f)	Mortier de 60 mm mle 1935	6		
229(j)	GrW 229(j)	7.58 cm Minenwerfer	7.5		
240(r)	MnW 240(r)	7 cm infantry cannon vz. 28 BA	7		(Note: Made by Škoda.)
257(e)	GrW 257(e)	ML 3-inch mortar	7.62		
270(j)	GrW 270(j)	8.1 cm MWM 31/38; Kragvjewac	8.14		
270/1(j)	GrW 270/1(j)	8.1 cm MWM 31	8.14		
274(r)	GrW 274(r)	82-PM-43	8.2		
274/1(r)	GrW 274/1(r)	82-PM-36	8.2		
274/2(r)	GrW 274/2(r)	82-BM-37	8.2		
274/3(r)	GrW 274/3(r)	82-PM-41	8.2		
275(d)	GrW 275(d)	81.4 mm L/12	8.14		
276(i)	GrW 276(i)	Mortaio da 81/14; Modello 35	8.1		
278(f) 278/1(f)	GrW 278(f) GrW 278/1(f)	Brandt Mle 27/31	8.14		L/13.5 L/13.7
278(t)	GrW 278(t)	81.4 mm minomet	8.14		
279(h)	GrW 279(h)	?	8.14		
286(h)	GrW 286(h)	Mortier van 8 Brandt (M.27/31)	8.14		
309(j)	GrW 309(j)	90 mm M.17 Malter	9		
328(r)	Geb.GrW 328(r)	107 mm mortar M1938	10.7		
356(a)	GrW 356(a)	81 mm mortar T4	8.1		
363(a)	NbW 363(e)	4.2-inch mortar M2	10.7		
366(e)	GrW 366(e)	ML 4.2-inch mortar	10.67		
378(r)	GrW 378(r)	120-PM-38	12		
379(r)	GrW 379(r)	120-PM-43	12		
380(f)	MnW 380(f)	Mortier de 120 mm modèle 1935	12		
391(r)	Br.KgW 391(r)	125 mm Ampulomyot; M1941	12.7		
400(e)	GrW 400(e)	29-mm Spigot Mortar	15		
442(r)	GrW 442(r)	?	15		
452(e)	Grb.GrW 452(e)	ML 6-in. mortar Mk I, II, III	15.2		
495(a)	MnW 495(a)	155 mm Trench Mortar (Newton)	15.5		
496(a)	GrW 496(a)	155 mm Trench Mortar M1920 (Carriage M1920)	15.5		(Note: Could be a development of the 150 mm Trench Mortar M1917.)
560(r)	MnW 560(r)	240 mm mortar M1917	24		

=== Without number designation ===
Short Designation	Weapon	Cal. (cm)	Image	Notes
8.14 cm GrW 33(ö)	Brandt Mle 27/31	8.14		
4.6 cm GrW 36(p)	Granatnik wz.36	4.6		
8.14 cm GrW 31(p)	wz. 31	8.14		
14 cm MnW 18(t)	14 cm hrubý minomet vz. 18 Link	14		
8 cm GrW M.36 (t)	8 cm minomet vz. 36	8		

== Railroad Artillery ==
Num.	Short Designation	Alternate Designation	Weapon	Cal.^{(cm)}	Origins	Image	Captured	Notes
453(f)	16.4 cm K.(E) 453(f)		Canon de 164 M^{le} 93/96 TAZ	16.4	France		Yes	Was assumed to be using bag cartridge.
454(f)	16.4 cm K.(E) 454(f)		Canon de 164 M^{le} 93/96 TAZ	16.4	France		Yes	Was assumed not to be using bag cartridge.
455(r)	15.2 cm H.(E) 455(r)		?	15.2	Soviet Union		Unknown	
486(f)	19.4 cm K.(E) 486(f)		Canon de 194 M^{le} 70/93 TAZ	19.4	France		Yes	
533(a)	20.3 cm K.(E) 533(a)		8-in. Gun M1888MIA1 (Barbette Carriage M1918; Railway Car M1918MI)	20.3	United States		No	
557(f)	24 cm K.(E) 557(f)		Canon de 240 M^{le} 84 TAZ	24	France		Yes	
558(f)	24 cm K.(E) 558(f)	24 cm K.(E) M.93/96 (f)	Canon de 240 M^{le} 93/96 TAZ	24	France		Yes	
571(a)	25.4 cm K.(E) 571(a)		10-inch gun M1895 (Sliding Railway Mount M1919)	25.4	United States		No	
572(r)	25.4 cm Kst.K.(E) 572(r)		254 mm railway gun (TM-8)	25.4	Soviet Union		No	
591(f)	27.4 cm K.(E) 591(f)		Canon de 274 M^{le} 87/93 à glissement	27.4	France		Yes	
592(f)	27.4 cm K.(E) 592(f)		Canon de 274 M^{le} 17 à glissement	27.4	France		Yes	
605(f)	28.5 cm K.(E) 605(f)		Canon de 285 M^{le} 17 à glissement	28.5	France		Yes	(Note: Re-bored to use 285 mm ammunition.)
621(a)	30.5 cm H.(E) 621(a)		12-in. mortar M1890 (Railway Carriage M1918)	30.5	United States		No	
625(r)	30.5 cm H.(E) 625(r)		305 mm railway gun M1932 (TM-2-12)	30.5	Soviet Union		No	
626(r)	30.5 cm K.(E) 626(r)		305 mm railway gun M1938 (TM-3-12)	30.5	Soviet Union		No	
628(r)	30.5 cm Kst.K.(E) 628(r)		305 mm railway gun _{Link}	30.5	Soviet Union		No	
630/1(f)	30.5 cm K.-W.-(E) 630/1(f)	30.5 cm K.-W.-(E) M.93 (f)	Canon de 305 M^{le} 93 à berceau	30.5	France		Yes	L/40 barrel (40 caliber length).
630/2(f)	30.5 cm K.-W.-(E) 630/2(f)	30.5 cm K.-W.-(E) M.93 (f)	Canon de 305 M^{le} 93 à berceau	30.5	France		Yes	L/45 barrel (45 caliber length).
633(e)	30.5 cm H.(E) 633(e)		BL 12-inch Howitzer Mk III (Mounting Mk II; Truck, Railway Mk II)	30.5	Great Britain		No	
634(e)	30.5 cm H.(E) 634(e)		BL 12-inch Howitzer Mk V (Mounting Mk III; Truck, Railway Mk III)	30.5	Great Britain		No	
636(f)	30.5 cm K.(E) 636(f)		Canon de 305 M^{le} 93/96 à glissement	30.5	France		Yes	
637(f)	30.5 cm K.(E) 637(f)		Canon de 305 M^{le} 06/10 à glissement	30.5	France		Yes	
651(f)	32 cm K.(E) 651(f)		Canon de 320 M^{le} 70/84 à glissement	32	France		Yes	
651/1(f)	32 cm K.(E) 651/1(f)		Canon de 320 M^{le} 70/93 à glissement	32	France		Yes	
652(f)	32 cm K.(E) 652(f)		Canon de 320 M^{le} 17 à glissement	32	France		Yes	
652(f)	32 cm K.(E) 652(f)		Canon de 320 M^{le} 17 à berceau	32	France		Yes	
673(f)	34 cm K.-Gl.-(E) 673(f)		Canon de 340 M^{le} 12 à glissement	34	France		Yes	
674(f)	34 cm K.-W.-(E) 674(f)		Canon de 340 M^{le} 12 à berceau	34	France		Yes	
675(f)	34 cm K.-W.-(E) 675(f)		Canon de 340 M^{le} 12 à berceau	34	France		Yes	(Note: L/62 barrel (62 caliber length).) It is an experimental gun, studied by "ingénieur général de l'artillerie navale" Bourgoin, a 340 mm L/60 on special mount (modified Saint-Chamond 340 mm sur affût à Berceau special mount), studied for 60.000 meters range.
681(a)	35.6 cm K.(E) 681(a)		14-in. Railway Gun M1920MII (Railway Carriage M1920)	35.6	United States		No	
711(f)	37 cm H.(E) 711(f)		Obusier de 370 M^{le} 15 à berceau	37	France		Yes	
714(f)	37 cm H.(E) 714(f)		Canon de 370 M^{le} 75/79 à glissement	37	France		Yes	
752(f)	40 cm H.(E) 752(f)		Obusier de 400 M^{le} 15/16 à berceau	40	France		Yes	
753(r)	40.6 cm Kst.K.(E) 753(r)		406 mm railway gun M1937 (B-37) _{Link}	40.6	Soviet Union		No	
754(a)	40.6 cm H.(E) 754(a)		16-inch Gun M1919	40.6	United States		No	
755(a)	40.6 cm H.(E) 755(a)		16-inch Howitzer M1920	40.6	United States		No	
871(f)	52 cm H.(E) 871(f)		Obusier de 520 M^{le} 16 à glissement	52	France		Yes	

== Tank guns ==
=== Tank guns with number designation ===
Num	Short designation	Weapon	Cal. (cm)	Image	Note
121(f)	2.5 cm KwK 121(f)	25 mm SA 35 L/72	2.5		
143(f)	3.7 cm KwK 143(f)	37 mm SA 38 L/33	3.7		
144(f)	3.7 cm KwK 144(f)	37 mm SA 18 L/21	3.7		
149(a)	3.7 cm KwK 149(a)	37 mm Tank Gun M5	3.7		
163(i)	3.7 cm KwK 163(i)	Cannone da 37 per Carri armati R35	3.7		
164(i)	3.7 cm KwK 164(i)	Vickers-Terni 37/40 modello 18	3.7		
171(e)	4 cm KwK 171(e)	QF 2-pdr Mk IX, X (Self-propelled mount)	4		
172(f)	4.7 cm KwK 172(f)	47 mm SA 34 L/30	4.7		
173(f)	4.7 cm KwK 173(f)	47 mm SA 35 L/32	4.7		
184/2(r)	4.5 cm kwK; 184/2(r)	45 mm tank gun M1932 (20-K)	4.5		
184/3(r) 184/4(r)	4.5 cm kwK 184/3(r) 4.5 cm kwK 184/4(r)	45 mm tank gun M1934 (20-K)	4.5		**electric firing
184/5(r)	4.5 cm kwK 184/5(r)	45 mm tank gun M1938 (20-K)	4.5		
251(f)	7.5 cm KwK 251(f)	75 mm SA 35 ABS L/17	7.5		
290/1(r)	7.62 cm KwK 290/1(r)	76 mm tank gun M1927/32 (KT-28)	7.62		
308(r)	7.62 cm KwK 308(r)	76 mm tank gun M1940 (F-34)	7.62		
310(r)	7.62 cm KwK 310(r)	76.2 mm tank gun M1938/39 (L-11)	7.62		
310(r)	7.62 cm KwK 310(r) auf Kas.Laf.	76.2 mm casemate gun M1940 (L-17)	7.62		
310/1(r)	7.62 cm KwK 310/1(r)	76 mm tank gun M1939 (F-32)	7.62		
310/2(r)	7.62 cm KwK 310/2(r)	76 mm tank gun M1938 (L-10)	7.62		
311(e)	9.4 cm KwK 311(e)	Ordnance QF 95 mm Tank Howitzer	9.4		
450(r)	7.62 cm KwH 450(r)	152 mm tank howitzer M1938/40 (M-10T)	15.2		

=== Tank guns without number designation ===
Short designation	Weapon	Cal. (cm)	Image	Note
3.7 cm KwK 34(t)	3,7cm KPÚV vz. 34	3.7		
3.7 cm KwK 38(t)	3,7cm ÚV vz. 38	3.7		

== See also ==
- German designations of foreign firearms in World War II
- List of foreign vehicles used by Nazi Germany in World War II
- List of World War II weapons
- List of prototype World War II infantry weapons
- Allies of World War II
- Axis powers
- Neutral powers during World War II
