= 12 cm felthaubits/m32 =

12 cm felthaubits m/32
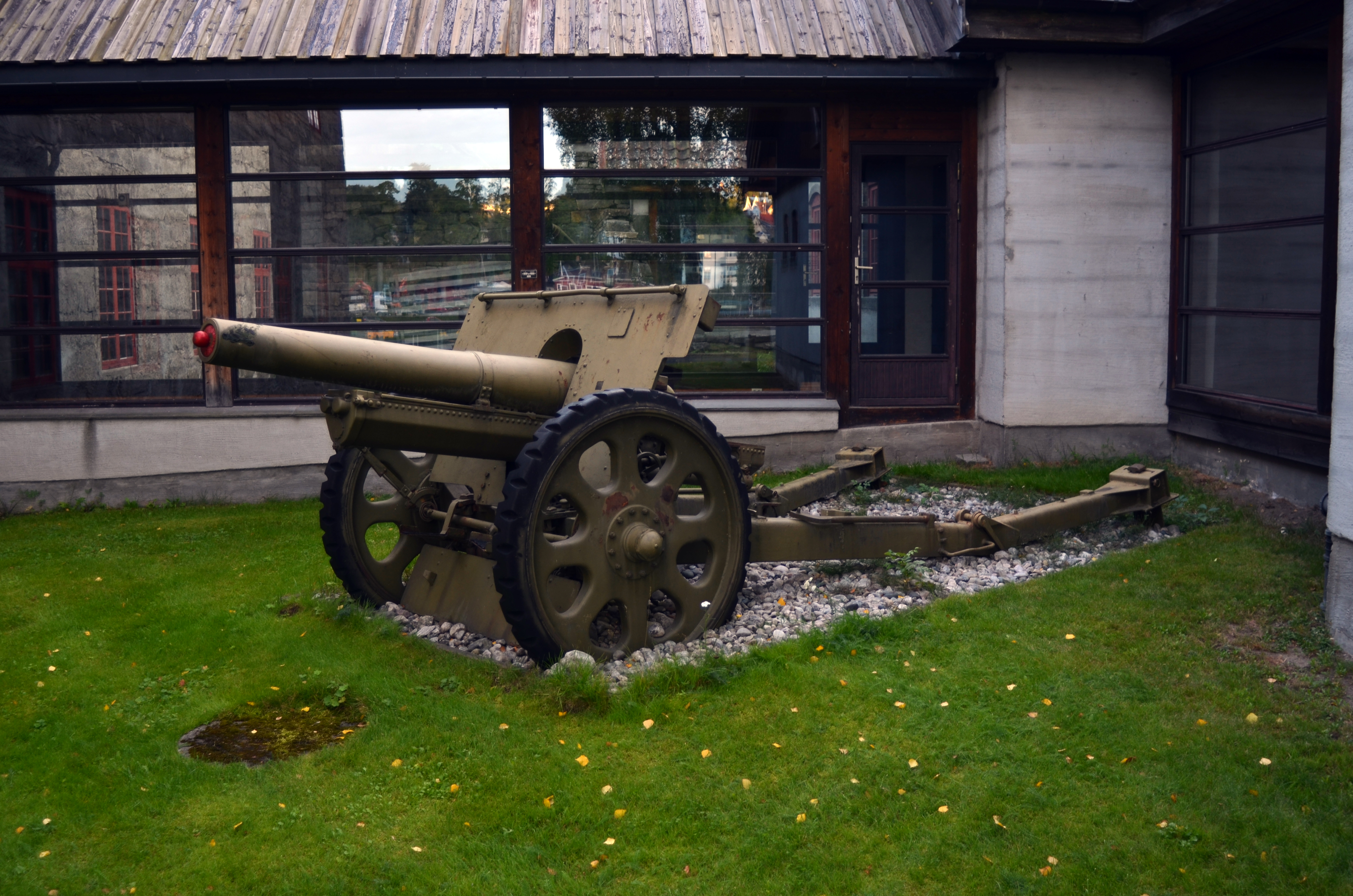
- The 12 cm felthaubits in Kongsberg.
- Type: Howitzer
- Place of origin: Norway

Service history
- Used by: Norway; Nazi Germany
- Wars: World War II

Production history
- Designer: Kongsberg
- Manufacturer: Kongsberg
- No. built: 8

Specifications
- Mass: 1,990 kilograms (4,390 lb)
- Barrel length: 2.4 metres (7 ft 10 in) L/20
- Shell: 20.4 kilograms (45 lb)
- Caliber: 120 mm (4.72 in)
- Carriage: split trail
- Elevation: -5° to +43°
- Traverse: 54°
- Muzzle velocity: 450 m/s (1,476 ft/s)
- Maximum firing range: 10,300 metres (11,300 yd)

The 12 cm felthaubits m/32 was a howitzer used by Norway in World War II.

== History ==
Eight were built during the 1930s to replace the obsolescent 12 cm le.FH. 08, which was known in Norwegian service as the 12 cm felthaubits m/32. They served with the single heavy artillery battalion of the Norwegian Army in 1940, but were unable to get ammunition during the campaign and were evacuated into Sweden, according to one source.

Captured guns were given a German designation after the Invasion of Norway as the 12 cm le.FH. 376(n). Two batteries of Artillerie-Abteilung 477, which served in Finland during the war, were equipped with 12 cm Norwegian howitzers, which might included these guns.

== Design ==
It was equipped with rubber-rimmed steel wheels for motorized towing.
