= Škoda 150 mm Model 1918 =

- Type: mountain howitzer
- Place of origin: Czechoslovakia

Service history
- In service: 1918–1945?
- Used by: Czechoslovakia; Nazi Germany
- Wars: World War II

Production history
- Designer: Škoda
- Manufacturer: Škoda
- Produced: 1918?

Specifications
- Mass: 2,800 kg (6,200 lb)
- Barrel length: 1.94 m (6 ft 4 in) L/13
- Shell: 42 kilograms (93 lb)
- Caliber: 149.1 mm (5.87 in)
- Carriage: Box trail
- Elevation: -5° to +70°
- Traverse: 7°
- Muzzle velocity: 340 m/s (1,115 ft/s)
- Maximum firing range: 8,000 m (8,700 yd)

The Škoda 150 mm Model 1918 was a heavy mountain howitzer, manufactured by Škoda Works. The design was begun during World War I, but the first prototype was completed as the war ended. After 1938, the Wehrmacht designated the few built as 15 cm GebH 18(t), although it's uncertain if they were actually used. The gun could be transported on six carts; each cart pulled by at least two horses or mules. The barrel assembly required three towing animals.
