= Škoda 76.5 mm L/50 =

Skoda 76.5 mm L/50
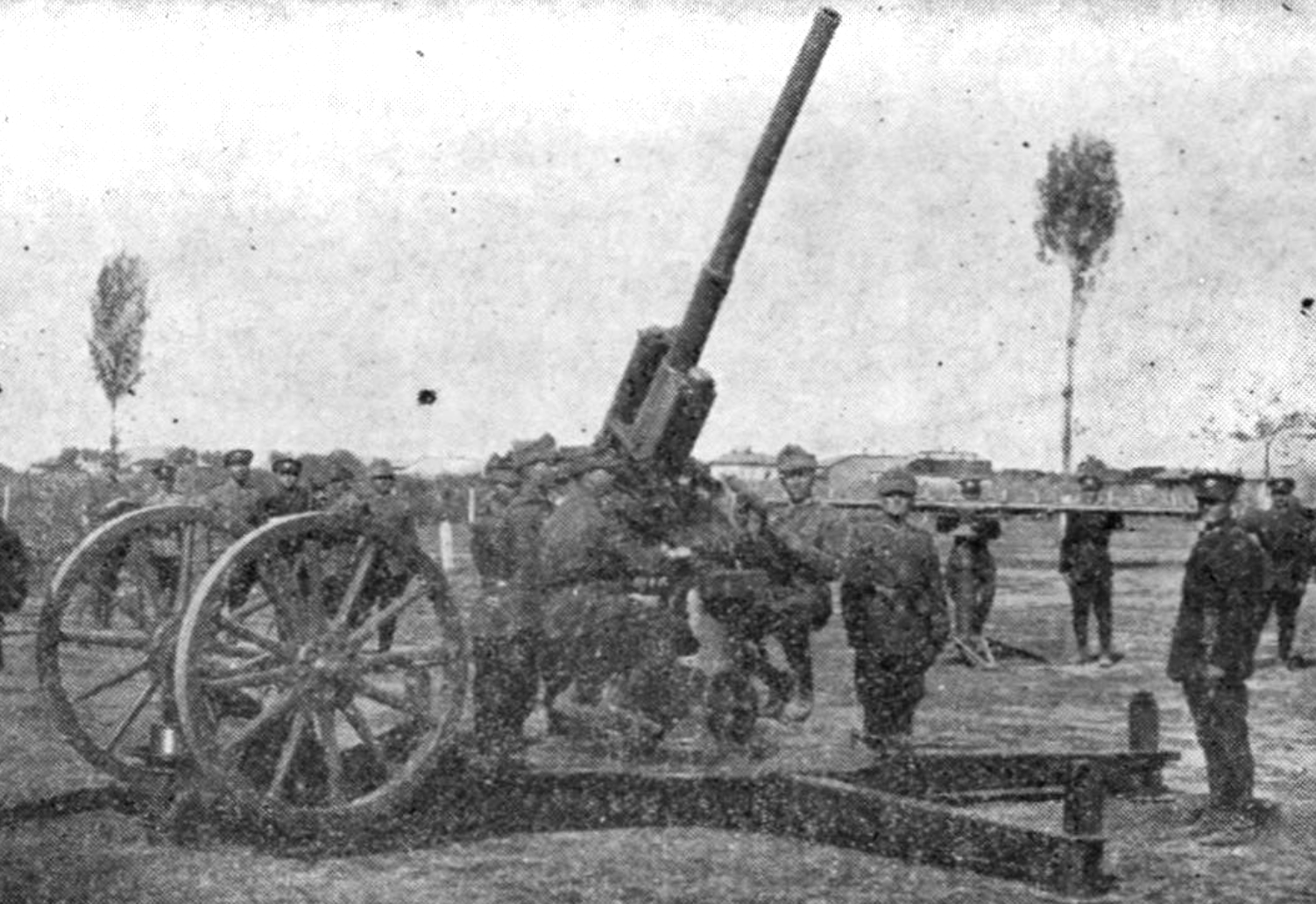
- Škoda 76.5 mm gun testing in Romania
- Type: Anti-aircraft gun
- Place of origin: Czechoslovakia

Service history
- In service: 1928–1945
- Used by: Argentina; Czechoslovakia; Lithuania; Nazi Germany; Romania; Yugoslavia
- Wars: World War II

Production history
- Designer: Škoda Works
- Manufacturer: Škoda Works
- Produced: 1928–1993?

Specifications
- Mass: 2,440 kg (5,380 lb)
- Barrel length: 3.8 m (12 ft 6 in) L/50
- Shell: Fixed QF
- Shell weight: 6.7 kg (15 lb)
- Caliber: 76.5 mm (3.01 in)
- Carriage: box trail with a single axle
- Elevation: 0° to +85°
- Traverse: 360°
- Muzzle velocity: 808 m/s (2,650 ft/s)
- Maximum firing range: 8.3 km (27,000 ft) vertical ceiling

The Škoda 76.5 mm L/50 was a Czech anti-aircraft gun used during the Second World War. Those weapons captured after the German occupation of Czechoslovakia in March 1939 were taken into Wehrmacht service as the 7.65 cm Flak 33(t).

== History ==
The 76.5 mm L/50 was produced by the Škoda Works in Plzeň. It was designed to replace an assortment of earlier Austro-Hungarian anti-aircraft guns that were in Czech use. Photos of the gun indicate that it had a box trail, a single unsprung axle, two spoked wheels, two recoil cylinders beneath the barrel and a muzzle brake. There is some confusion about the exact title of the gun, when it was produced or how many were produced. What can be agreed on is there was a Škoda 76.5 mm anti-aircraft gun produced sometime between 1928 and 1933, it was 50 calibers in length and it was used by the armed forces of Argentina, Czechoslovakia, Lithuania, Nazi Germany, Romania and Yugoslavia.
