= 15 cm hrubá houfnice vz. 25 =

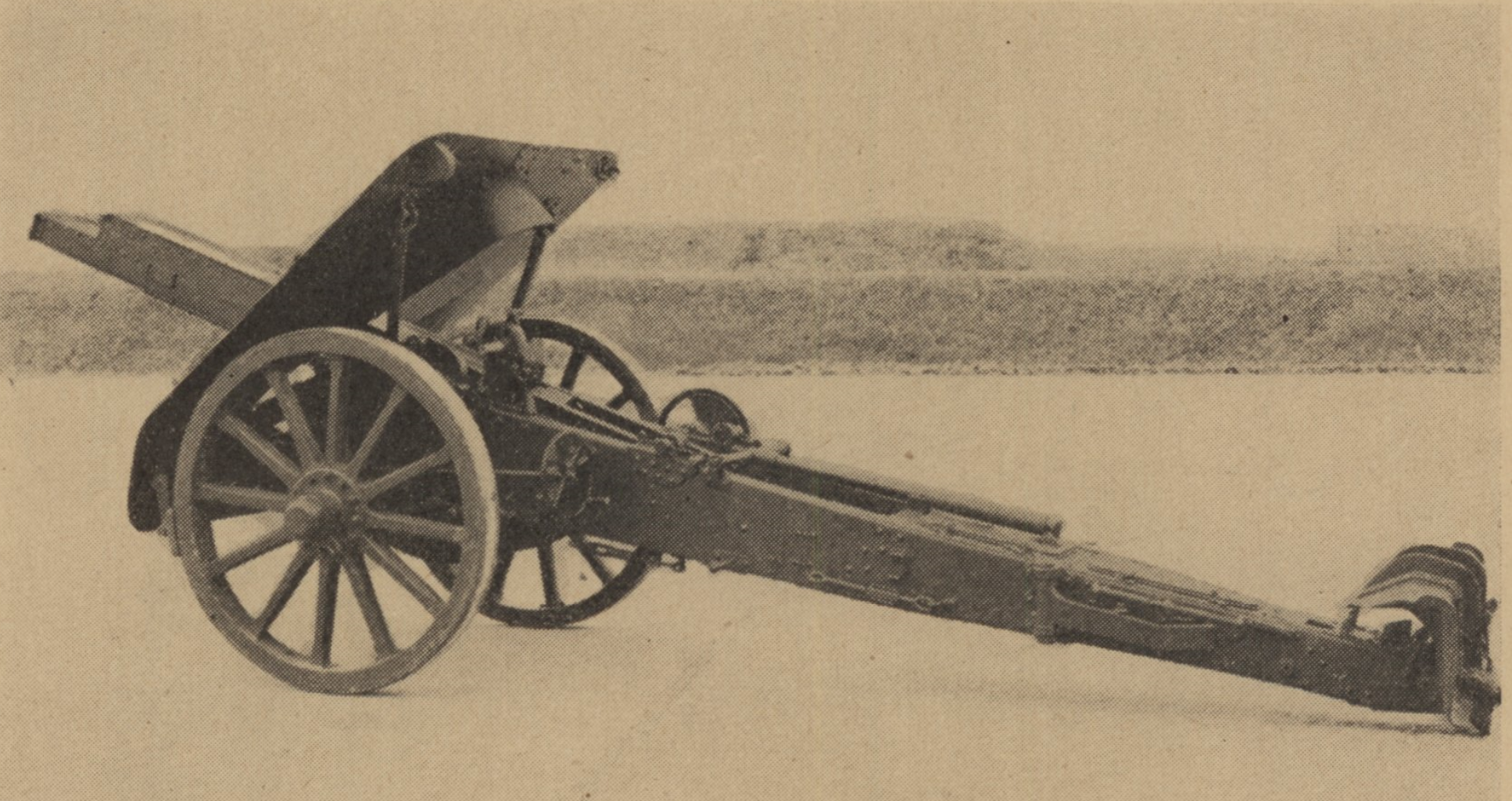
- 15 cm hrubá houfnice vz. 25 without barrel
- Type: Howitzer
- Place of origin: Czechoslovakia

Service history
- In service: 1930–1945
- Used by: Czechoslovakia; Nazi Germany; Slovakia
- Wars: World War II

Production history
- Designer: Škoda
- Manufacturer: Škoda
- Produced: 1924-34

Specifications
- Mass: 3,800 kilograms (8,400 lb)
- Barrel length: 2.7 m (8 ft 10 in) L/18
- Shell: 42 kilograms (93 lb)
- Caliber: 149.1 mm (5.87 in)
- Carriage: box trail
- Elevation: -5° to +70°
- Traverse: 7°
- Rate of fire: 1-2 rpm
- Muzzle velocity: 450 m/s (1,476 ft/s)
- Maximum firing range: 11,800 metres (12,900 yd)

The 15 cm hrubá houfnice vz. 25 (Heavy howitzer model 25) was a Czech heavy howitzer used in the Second World War. It was taken into Wehrmacht service as the 15 cm sFH 25(t). Slovakia had 126 in inventory.

== Design & History ==
Intended to replace the various Austro-Hungarian heavy howitzer that the Czechs had inherited, they began a program to develop a new howitzer shortly after achieving independence in 1919. It didn't reflect many of the lessons of World War I as it retained a box trail and wooden wheels suitable only for horse traction. Its carriage broke down into two loads for transport. It fired a 42 kilograms (93 lb) shell.
