= 3,7cm KPÚV vz. 37 =

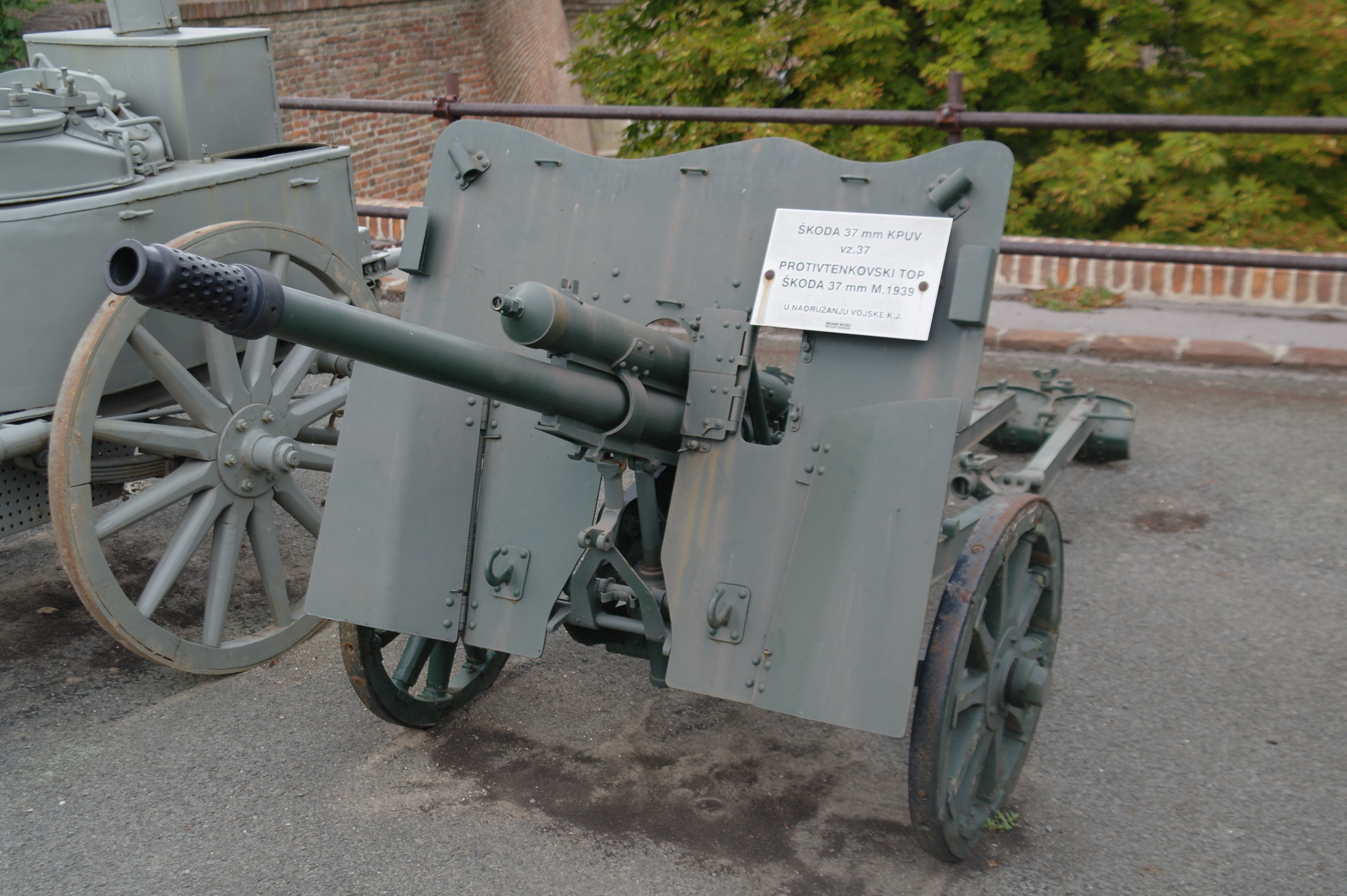
- Škoda 37 mm vz. 37 on display at Belgrade's Military Museum
- Type: Anti-tank gun
- Place of origin: Czechoslovakia

Service history
- Used by: Czechoslovakia; Nazi Germany; Yugoslavia; Bulgaria; Slovakia
- Wars: World War II

Production history
- Designer: Škoda Works
- Designed: 1935–1936
- Manufacturer: Škoda Works
- Produced: 1936–1939

Specifications
- Mass: 370 kg (800 lb)
- Barrel length: 1.77 m (5 ft 10 in) L/47.8
- Crew: ?
- Shell: Fixed QF 37×268mmR
- Shell weight: 0.8 kg (1 lb 12 oz)
- Caliber: 37.2 mm (1.46 in)
- Breech: Semi-automatic vertical sliding-block
- Carriage: Split trail
- Elevation: -8° / +26°
- Traverse: 50°
- Rate of fire: 12 rounds per minute
- Muzzle velocity: 750 m/s (2,500 ft/s)
- Effective firing range: 900 m (980 yd)

The 3,7 cm KPÚV vz. 37 (Czech: kanón proti útočné vozbě 37) was an anti-tank gun produced by the Škoda Works that saw service in World War II.

== History ==
Originally designed for the Czechoslovak Army, some were also sold to Yugoslavia.

A number were appropriated by the Germans after the German occupation of Czechoslovakia in 1939 and used under the designations 3,7 cm PaK 37 (t). Captured Yugoslav guns were used under the designation of 3,7 cm Pak 156 (j).

Slovakia acquired 158 when it declared independence from Czechoslovakia in March 1939.

== Design ==
The gun had a small shield and wooden-spoked wheels, although some were fitted with pneumatic wheels, designated vz. 37M.
