= Bofors 12 cm M. 14 =

- Type: Howitzer
- Place of origin: Sweden

Service history
- Used by: Netherlands; Norway; Nazi Germany
- Wars: World War II

Production history
- Designer: Bofors
- Designed: 1914
- Manufacturer: Bofors
- Produced: 1914–1917
- No. built: Netherlands: 48; Norway: 4

Specifications
- Mass: In traction: 2,025 kg (4,464 lb); Action: 1,370 kg (3,020 lb)
- Barrel length: Netherlands: 1.44 m (4.7 ft) L/12; Norway: 1.725 m (5.66 ft) L/14
- Crew: 7
- Shell: 120×141mmR
- Shell weight: 20.4 kg (45 lb)
- Caliber: 120 mm (4.72 in)
- Breech: Horizontal Sliding Wedge
- Recoil: Hydropneumatic
- Carriage: Box trail
- Elevation: Netherlands: -0° / +45°; Norway: -5° / +45°
- Traverse: Netherlands: 0°; Norway: 4°
- Rate of fire: Netherlands: 3 rounds/min; Norway: 4 rounds/min
- Muzzle velocity: 317 m/s (1,040 ft/s)
- Maximum firing range: 6,050 m (6,620 yd)
- Feed system: Single-shot
- Filling: HE
- Filling weight: 16.5 kg (36 lb)

The Bofors 12 cm M. 14 was a howitzer made for export, created in Sweden.

== Service ==
=== Netherlands ===
The howitzer was used by the Netherlands as the Houwitzer Van 12 Lang 14. To supplement their existing 12 cm L/12 Krupp howitzers during WW1 the Netherlands ordered a total of 24 12 cm L/14 howitzers from Bofors in Sweden, the order consisted of 8 complete guns and part kits for another 16 guns to be constructed in the Netherlands. The contract was made in 1915 and the order was delivered in 1917. After the war more pieces of the type were built in the Netherlands at the arsenal in Hembrug. They were still in service in 1940 and saw action during the defense of the Netherlands.

=== Norway ===
Norway ordered 4 pieces, entering service in 1915 as the 12 cm felthaubits m/15.

=== Germany ===
Howitzers captured after the Battle of the Netherlands were given the designation 12 cm le.FH 373(h), although it is not certain that they were actually used by German forces.
