= Canon de 105 modèle 1925/27 Schneider =

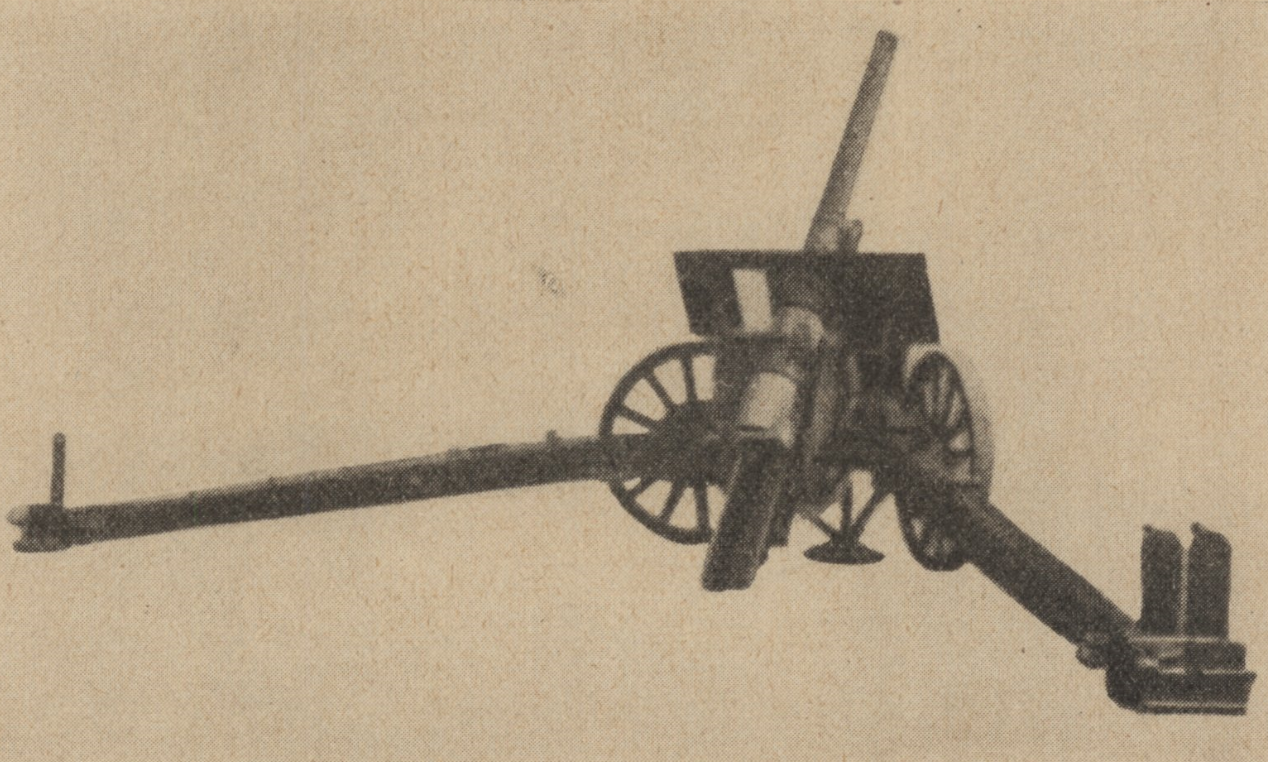
- Type: Heavy field gun
- Place of origin: France

Service history
- In service: 1927–1945
- Used by: Greece
- Wars: World War II

Production history
- Designer: Schneider
- Manufacturer: Schneider

Specifications
- Mass: 3,260 kilograms (7,190 lb)
- Barrel length: 3.24 metres (10 ft 8 in) L/30.8
- Shell: 15.66 kilograms (34 lb 8 oz)
- Caliber: 105 mm (4.13 in)
- Carriage: Split trail
- Elevation: -3° to +60°
- Traverse: 80°
- Muzzle velocity: 660 m/s (2,165 ft/s)
- Maximum firing range: 15.5 kilometres (9.6 mi)

The Canon de 105 modèle 1925/27 Schneider was a heavy field gun used by Greece during World War II. It was bought at the same time as the Canon de 85 modèle 1927 Schneider The Germans allotted this gun the designation of 10.5 cm Kanone 340(g), but it is unknown if they actually used them themselves.
