= Canon de 75 mle GP II =

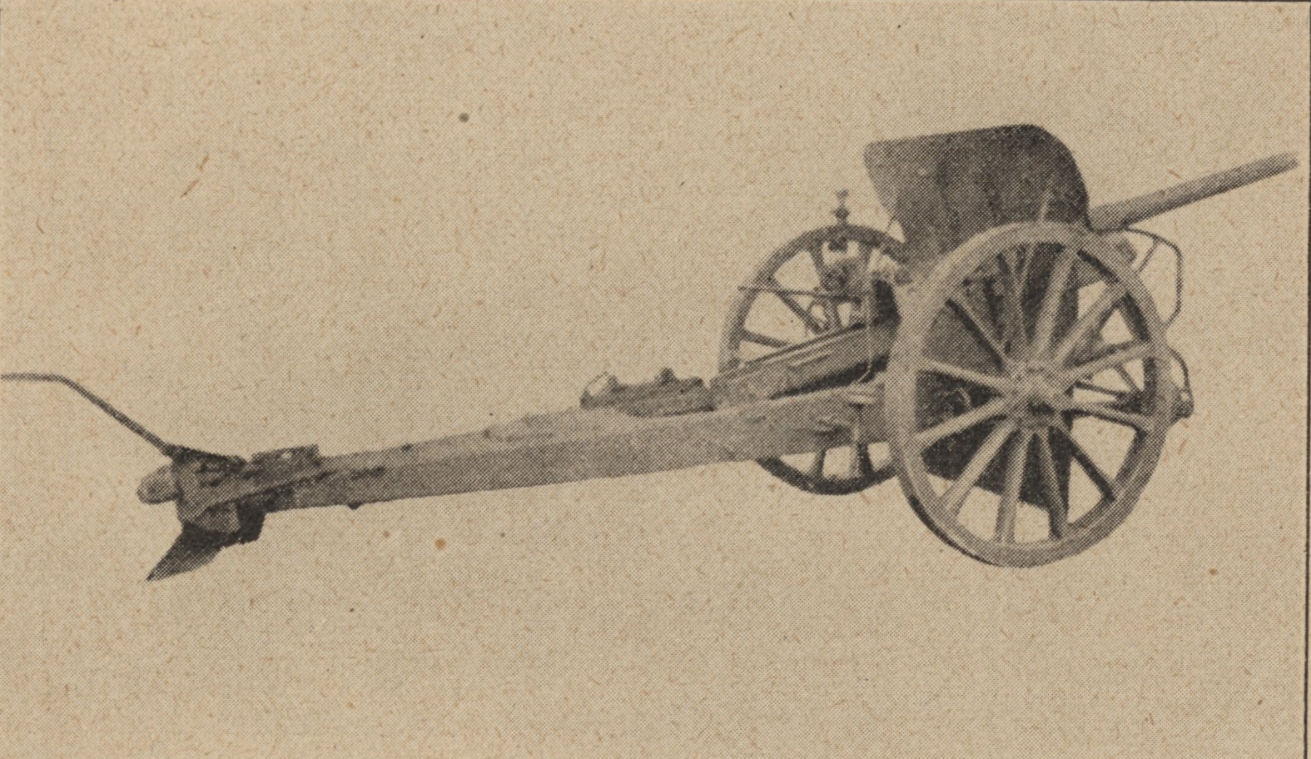
- Type: Field gun
- Place of origin: Belgium

Service history
- In service: 1919?-1945
- Used by: Belgium; Nazi Germany
- Wars: World War II

Production history
- Designer: Cockerill
- Manufacturer: Cockerill

Specifications
- Mass: 2,477 kg (5,461 lb) (travelling); 1,510 kg (3,330 lb) (combat)
- Barrel length: 2.806 m (9 ft 2.5 in) L/37.4
- Shell: Fixed QF 75 x 150mm R
- Shell weight: 6.125 kg (13 lb 8 oz)
- Caliber: 75 mm (2.95 in)
- Carriage: Box trail
- Elevation: -7° to +43°
- Traverse: 8°
- Muzzle velocity: 579 m/s (1,899 ft/s)
- Maximum firing range: 11 km (6.8 mi)

The Canon de 75 mle GP II was a field gun used by Belgium during World War II. Cockerill mounted lengthened Canon de 75 mle TR barrels on ex-German 7.7 cm FK 16 gun carriages received as reparations after World War I. After 1940, the Wehrmacht designated captured guns as the 7.5 cm FK 234(b) and used them to equip occupation units in Belgium.
