= Mortier de 150 mm T Mle 1917 Fabry =

Mortier de 150 mm T Modèle 1917 Fabry
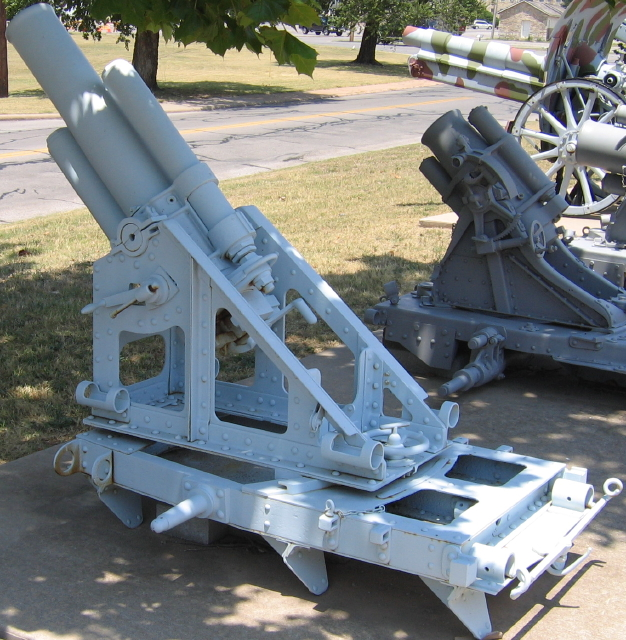
- A Fabry Trench Mortar at the U.S. Army Field Artillery Museum, Ft. Sill, OK
- Type: Heavy trench mortar
- Place of origin: France

Service history
- In service: August 1918–1940
- Used by: France; United States
- Wars: World War I World War II

Production history
- Designed: 1917
- No. built: 1,159+

Specifications
- Mass: 615 kg (1,353 lbs)
- Barrel length: 2100 mm
- Diameter: 150 mm
- Calibre: 150 mm
- Breech: muzzle-loading
- Recoil: recoil-recuperators in a flask rocker assembly
- Carriage: firing platform
- Elevation: 45°–72°
- Traverse: 27°
- Rate of fire: 2–4 rpm
- Muzzle velocity: 156 m/s
- Maximum firing range: 2,000 m (2,167 yards)

The Mortier de 150 mm T Modèle 1917 Fabry was the standard French Heavy trench mortar of World War I. It remained in service through 1940, with some 1,159 available during the Phony War. The tube was supported by two recoil-recuperators in a flask-rocker assembly that was mounted on a platform with six fixed spades. The finned mortar "bomb" was loaded from the muzzle, but the propellant was loaded from the breech and ignited by a percussion ignition system.

For transport it was broken down into three loads, each towed on machine gun carts by either one horse or eight men. Each cart also carried twenty 17-kilogram (37 lb) bombs.
