= 21 cm Mörser M. 16/18 =

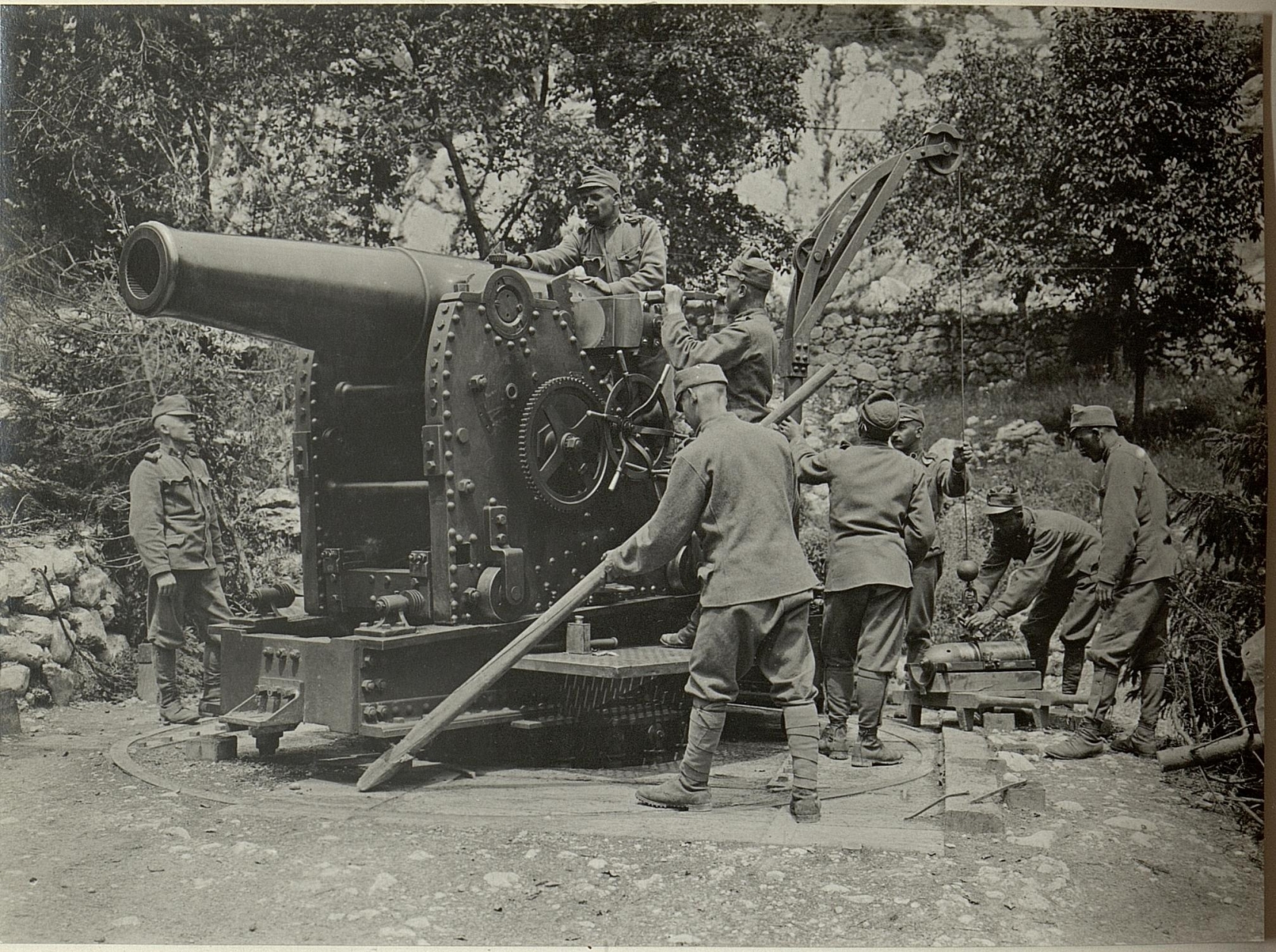
- Type: Heavy howitzer
- Place of origin: Austria-Hungary

Service history
- In service: 1916–1945
- Used by: Austria-Hungary; Czechoslovakia; Nazi Germany
- Wars: World War I World War II

Production history
- Designer: Škoda Works
- Designed: 1915–19
- Manufacturer: Škoda Works
- No. built: at least 15
- Variants: M. 16, M. 18, M. 18/19

Specifications
- Mass: 9,460 kg (20,860 lb)
- Barrel length: 3.36 m (132 in) L/16
- Shell: 135 kg (298 lb)
- Caliber: 210 mm (8.3 in)
- Breech: Horizontal sliding-block
- Recoil: Hydro-pneumatic
- Carriage: Box trail
- Elevation: +40° to +71° 30'
- Traverse: 360°
- Muzzle velocity: 380 m/s (1,200 ft/s)
- Maximum firing range: 10 km (6.2 mi)

The 21 cm Mörser M. 16 was a heavy howitzer used by Austria-Hungary during World War I. Škoda Works began design in 1915 for a wheeled howitzer that could be towed in a single load by a tractor.

== History and development ==
The first prototype wasn't satisfactory as it was too heavy and traversing was difficult due to the very high limber bar pressure. A second howitzer was delivered in mid-1917 that broke down into two loads for transport. This, at least, cured the traversing problem of the first weapon, as reported by the test battery assigned to the 11th Army. In the meantime, however, a third prototype had been ordered as the M. 18 with a carriage based on that of the Škoda 305 mm Model 1911 that would allow for full traverse at the price of more time needed to emplace the firing platform. It broke down into three loads for transport. No M. 18s were delivered by the end of the war, although Skoda built some modified versions as the M. 18/19 for the newly independent Czechoslovakia where they were known as the 21 cm Moždíř vz. 18. After the Occupation of Czechoslovakia in 1939 the Germans adopted them under the names of 21 cm Mörser 18/19(t) or kurze 21 cm Mörser(t) and used at least 15 on coast-defense duties in Norway.

== Examples ==
The only known surviving piece at the National Military Museum, Romania.
