= 8 cm PL kanon vz. 37 =

8 cm kanon PL vz. 37
- Type: Anti-aircraft gun
- Place of origin: Czechoslovakia

Service history
- In service: 1937−1945
- Used by: Czechoslovakia; Nazi Germany
- Wars: World War II

Production history
- Designer: Škoda Works
- Manufacturer: Škoda Works
- Produced: 1937−39?

Specifications
- Mass: 3,800 kilograms (8,400 lb)
- Barrel length: 4.04 metres (13 ft 3 in) L/52.8
- Shell: 76.5 x 723mm R, rim dia.100mm
- Shell weight: 8 kilograms (18 lb)
- Caliber: 76.5 millimetres (3.01 in)
- Carriage: cruciform
- Elevation: 0° to +85°
- Traverse: 360°
- Rate of fire: 10-15 rpm
- Muzzle velocity: 800 metres per second (2,600 ft/s)
- Maximum firing range: 11,470 metres (37,630 ft) vertical ceiling

The 8 cm kanon PL vz. 37 (Anti-aircraft Gun Model 37) was a Czech anti-aircraft gun used during the Second World War. Those weapons captured after the German occupation of Czechoslovakia in March 1939 were taken into Wehrmacht service as the 7.65 cm Flak M 37(t). 97 were in service during the Munich Crisis in September 1938 of which Slovakia seized one when it declared independence six months later.
