= 4cm kanón vz. 36 =

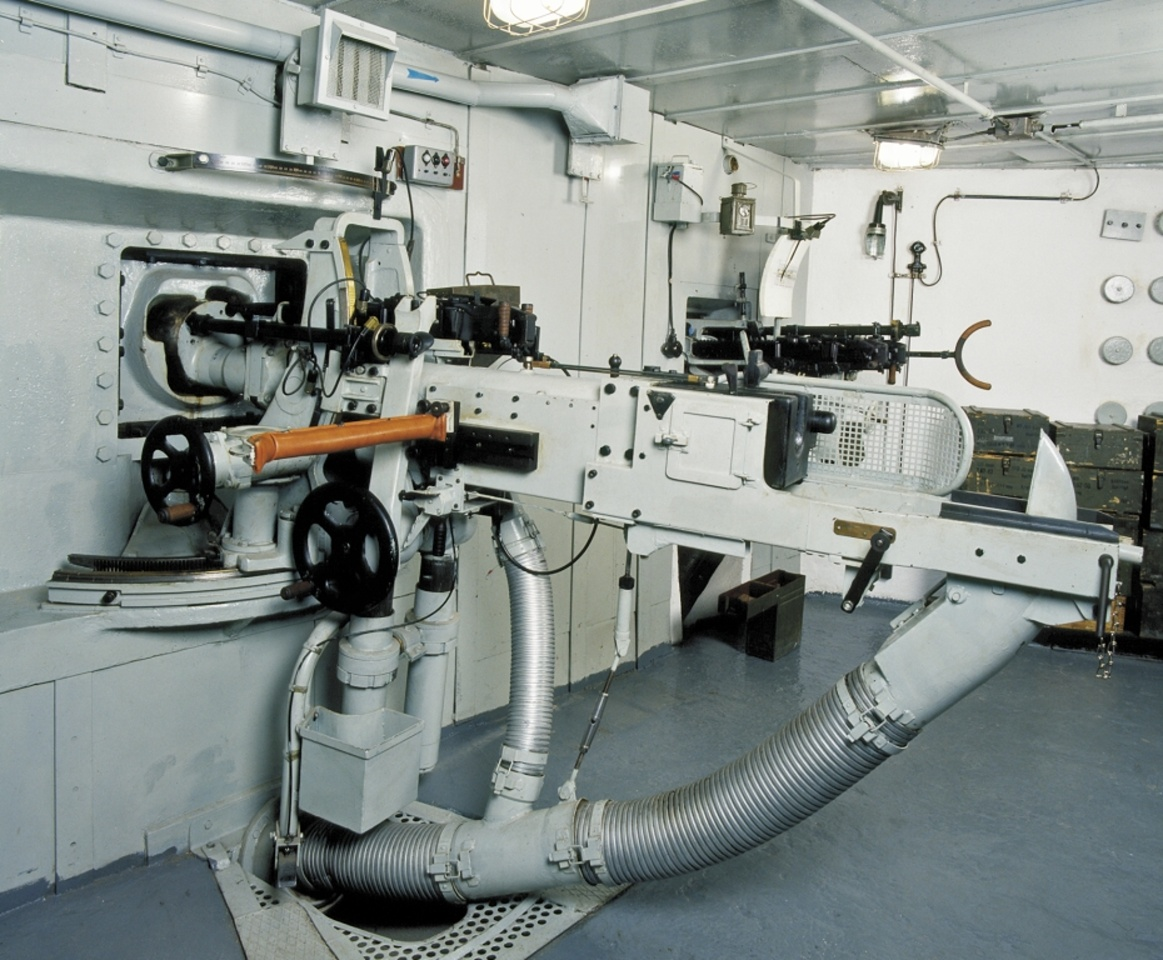
- 4cm kanón vz. 36 in MO-S 19 infantry casemate
- Type: Anti-tank gun
- Place of origin: Czechoslovakia

Service history
- Used by: Czechoslovakia; Nazi Germany
- Wars: World War II

Production history
- Designed: 1935
- Manufacturer: Škoda Works
- Produced: 1935–1939

Specifications
- Mass: 1,250 kg
- Barrel length: 2.04 m (6 ft 8 in) L/43
- Crew: 3
- Caliber: 47 mm, 47X404 (1.85 in)
- Elevation: -15° to +12°
- Traverse: 45°
- Muzzle velocity: 775 m/s (2,540 ft/s)
- Maximum firing range: 5,800 m

The 4 cm kanón vz. 36 (i.e., 4 cm Cannon Model 36) was an anti-tank gun produced by the Škoda Works in the 1930s. Although initially two types were developed—37 and 47mm—only the larger stayed. It should have been used in two variants Q and L1 while the L1 was the cannon with the vz. 37 machine gun. Only few Q variants were made. Three series of 268, 273 and 200(8.7. 1937, 30.3. 1938, ?.7. 1938 - date of orders) cannons were ordered, but only the first delivered. It was used in Czechoslovak border fortifications and after German occupation of Czechoslovakia it saw service in Atlantic Wall fortifications under the designation 4,7 cm Pak K 36(t).
