= Canon de 75 mle GP1 =

Canon de 75 mle GP I
- Type: Field gun
- Place of origin: Belgium

Service history
- In service: 1919?-1945
- Used by: Belgium; Nazi Germany
- Wars: World War II

Production history
- Designer: Cockerill
- Manufacturer: Cockerill

Specifications
- Mass: 2,337 kg (5,152 lb) (traveling)
- Barrel length: 2.625 m (8 ft 7.3 in) L/35
- Shell: Fixed QF 75 x 150mm R
- Shell weight: 6.125 kg (13 lb 8 oz)
- Caliber: 75 mm (2.95 in)
- Carriage: Box trail
- Elevation: -13° to +42°
- Traverse: 3°
- Muzzle velocity: 579 m/s (1,899 ft/s)
- Maximum firing range: 11 km (6.8 mi)

The Canon de 75 mle GP I was a field gun used by Belgium during World War II. Cockerill mounted lengthened Canon de 75 mle TR barrels on ex-German 10.5 cm leFH 16 howitzer carriages received as reparations after World War I. After 1940, the Wehrmacht designated captured guns as the 7.5 cm FK 233(b) and used them to equip occupation units in Belgium.
