= Canon de 155 L mle 1924 =

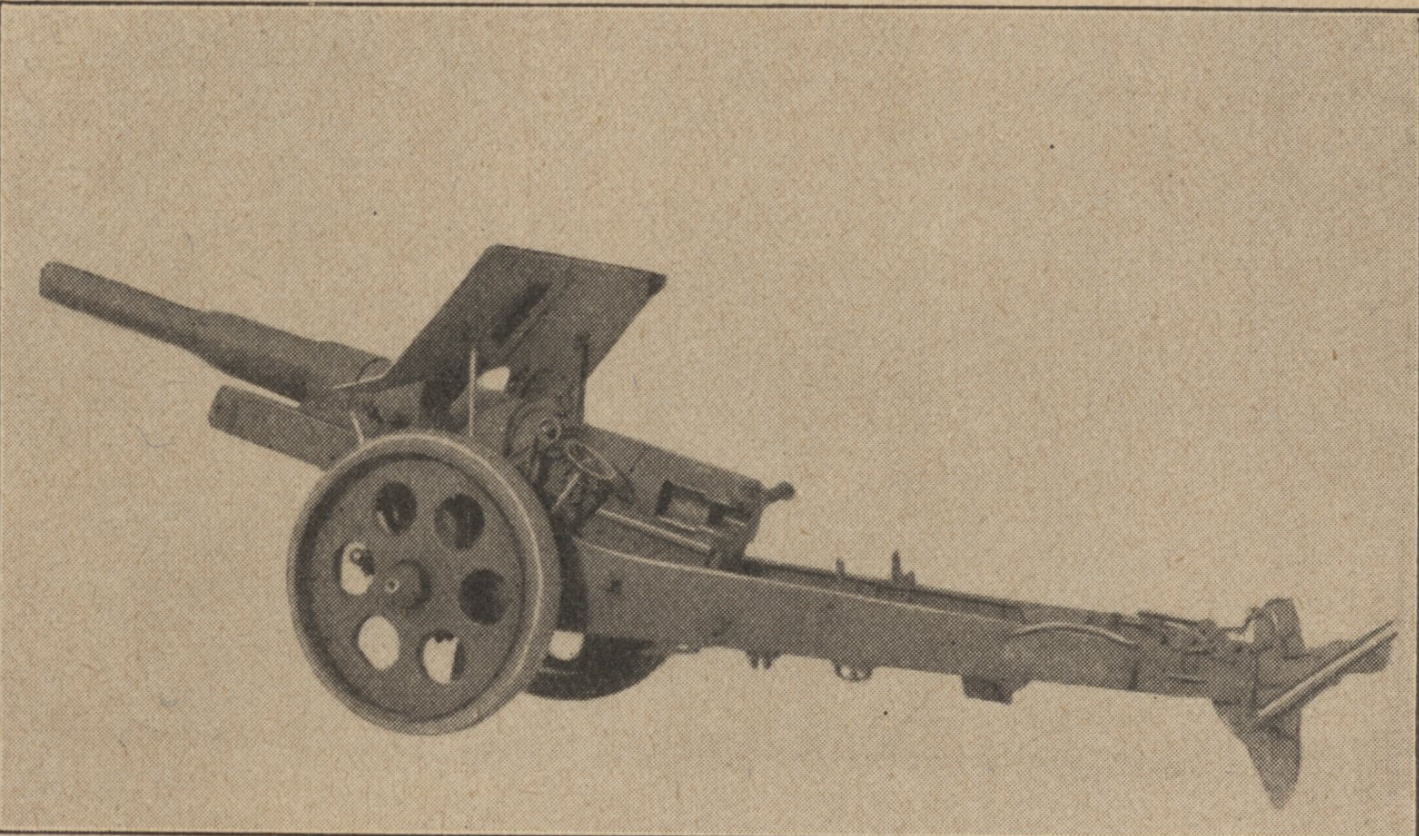
- Type: heavy gun
- Place of origin: Belgium

Service history
- Used by: Belgium; Nazi Germany
- Wars: World War II

Production history
- Designer: Cockerill
- Manufacturer: Cockerill
- No. built: 24?

Specifications
- Mass: 7,840 kilograms (17,280 lb)
- Barrel length: 4.721 metres (15 ft 6 in) L/30.8
- Shell: 43 kilograms (94 lb 13 oz)
- Caliber: 155 mm (6.10 in)
- Carriage: Box trail
- Elevation: +5° to +26°
- Traverse: 4°
- Muzzle velocity: 665 m/s (2,180 ft/s)
- Maximum firing range: 17,000 metres (19,000 yd)

The Canon de 155 L mle 1924 was a heavy gun used by Belgium during World War II. After the Germans occupied conquered Belgium in May 1940 they took over the surviving weapons as the 15.5 cm Kanone 432(b).

The gun were constructed using carriages of Krupp 13 cm Kanone 09 modified for motor traction in 1917. It broke down into two loads for transport.
