= 9 cm kanon PL vz. 12/20 =

9 cm PL kanon vz. 12/20
- Type: Anti-aircraft gun
- Place of origin: Czechoslovakia

Service history
- In service: 1920–1945?
- Used by: Czechoslovakia; Nazi Germany; Yugoslavia; Soviet Union
- Wars: World War II

Production history
- Designer: Škoda Works
- Manufacturer: Škoda Works

Specifications
- Mass: 6,500 kilograms (14,300 lb)
- Barrel length: 4.05 metres (13 ft 3 in) L/45
- Shell weight: 10.2 kilograms (22 lb 8 oz)
- Caliber: 90 millimetres (3.5 in)
- Elevation: -5° to +90°
- Traverse: 360°
- Rate of fire: 12 rpm
- Muzzle velocity: 775 metres per second (2,540 ft/s)
- Maximum firing range: 6,000 metres (20,000 ft) vertical ceiling

The 9 cm PL kanon vz. 12/20 (Anti-aircraft Gun Model 12/20) was a Czech anti-aircraft gun used during World War II. Those weapons captured after the German occupation of Czechoslovakia in March 1939 were taken into Wehrmacht service as the 9 cm Flak M 12(t). Some guns were reportedly captured in Yugoslavia and the Soviet Union as well. Twenty were in Czech service during the Munich Crisis in September 1938. Twelve were in German service between August 1943 and June 1944. According to Nebojša Đokić and Branko Nadoveza "Import of weapons for Army and Navy of Kingdom of SHS and Yugoslavia" 1 battery (4 guns?) were apparently stationed in Bay of Kotor in Kingdom of Yugoslavia (now Montenegro). Same authors in second part of book "Import of weapons for Army and Navy of Kingdom of SHS and Yugoslavia" in which import from Great Britain and Germany was analyzed, claim that 9 guns were installed on 6 Galeb-class minelayer minelayers of Royal Yugoslav Navy, 2 each on Sokol, Galeb and Orao and 1 on Jastreb Kobac and Gavran. Latter some of those guns (5?)were replaced with 8.35 cm Škoda AA guns. It is possible that some of those guns after replacement on ships were put in service as ground anti aircraft battery.

== Description ==
The PL kanon vz. 12/20 was a modernized version of a pre-World War I anti-aircraft gun. It was mounted on a fixed pedestal.
