= Rheinmetall 12 cm leFH 08 =

Rheinmetall 12 cm leFH 08 12 cm felthaubits m/08
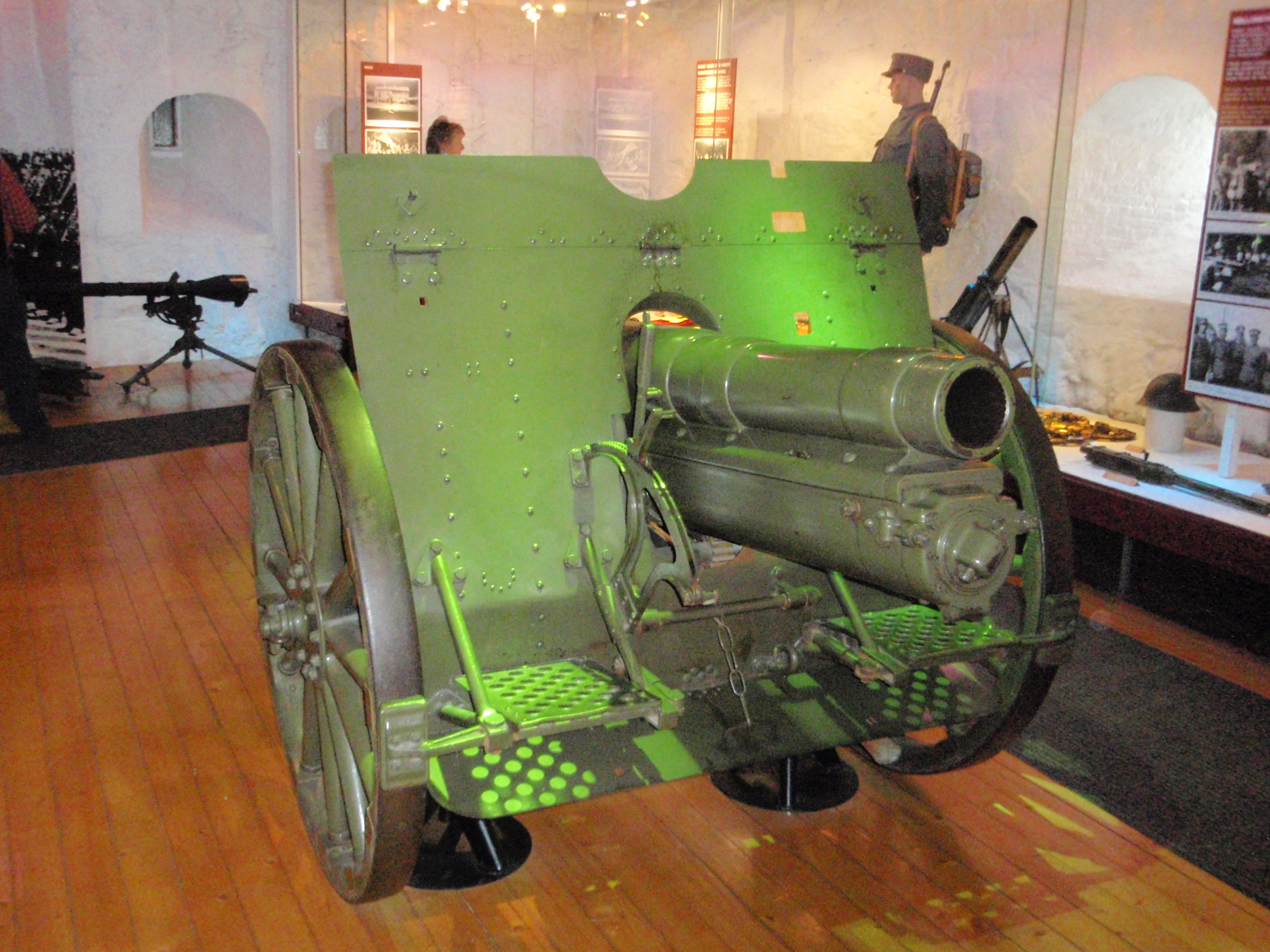
- Type: Howitzer
- Place of origin: Germany

Service history
- Used by: Norway; Nazi Germany
- Wars: World War II

Production history
- Designer: Rheinmetall
- Manufacturer: Rheinmetall
- Produced: 1908
- No. built: 8

Specifications
- Mass: 1,360 kilograms (3,000 lb)
- Barrel length: 2.4 metres (7.9 ft) L/20
- Shell: 20.4 kilograms (45 lb)
- Caliber: 120 mm (4.72 in)
- Recoil: Hydro-pneumatic
- Carriage: Box-trail
- Elevation: -5° to +45°
- Traverse: 4°
- Muzzle velocity: 300 m/s (1,476 ft/s)
- Maximum firing range: 6,100 metres (6,700 yd)

The Rheinmetall 12 cm leFH 08 was a howitzer used by Norway in World War II.

== History ==
It was known in Norwegian service as the 12 cm felthaubits m/08. Captured guns were given a German designation after the Invasion of Norway as the 12 cm le.FH. 375(n). Two batteries of Artillerie-Abteilung 477, which served in Finland during the war, were equipped with 12 cm Norwegian howitzers, which might have included these guns.
