= Mine shell =

Type of shell construction

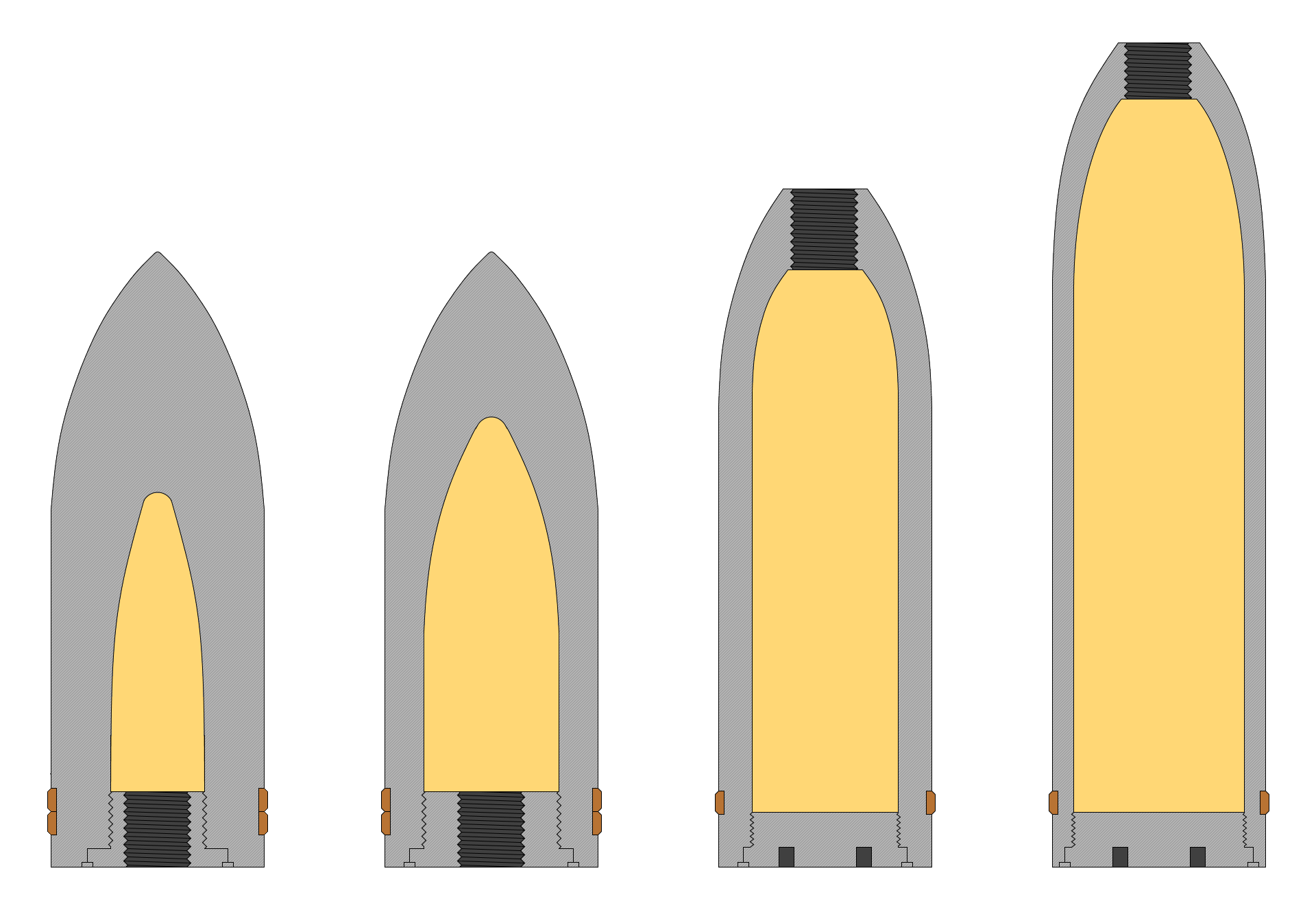
Some classic shell types placed from left to right in relation to explosive filler (in yellow), from left to right: • APHE – armor-piercing, high-explosive; • SAPHE – semi armor-piercing, high-explosive; • HE – high-explosive; • HCHE – high capacity high-explosive (mine shell)

A mine shell (from German: Minengeschoss, lit. 'mine shot'), or high capacity high-explosive (HCHE) in British military nomenclature, is a military explosive shell type characterized by thin (usually steel) shell walls which allow a much higher explosive content than standard high-explosive shells of the same caliber, trading a higher pressure wave effect against high-explosive shells' larger fragmentation effect and better penetration of armoured targets.

Mine shells were originally developed during the mid- to late 1800s against fortresses before the introduction of rebar; reinforced fortresses had made the original use of the type obsolete around World War I, but they were given a new role against aircraft during World War II.

== Description ==
=== Effect ===
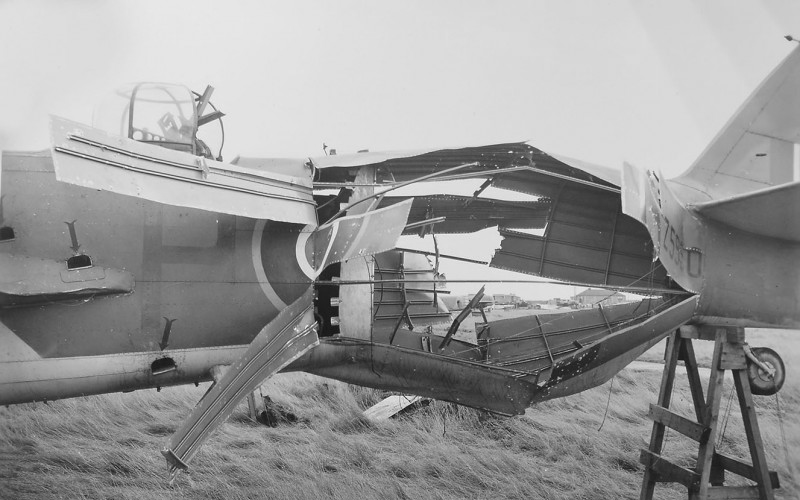
British test of a single German 30 mm mine shell hitting a Bristol Blenheim bomber aircraft.

The mine shell is a more explosive version of the common high-explosive and high-explosive fragmentation shells, relying on inflicting damage primarily through the blast (pressure wave) alone, rather than the higher fragmentation but less blast provided by standard high-explosive shells.

The specific effect of mine shells, in German called Minenwirkung, in Swedish minverkan, lit. 'mine action', is defined by the Swedish Armed Forces as "the pressure action from an encased explosive charge", i.e., the effect of munition designed for pressure action when encased (in the target). Pressure action itself (tryckverkan, or tryckvågsverkan, lit. 'pressure wave action') is defined as:

"Pressure action" – A general term for all types of weapons effects that depend on a pressure-time course around or in an object, for example pressure in a gun barrel when fired, "mine action" (encased pressure blast), "shock action" (shock wave blast), "contact blast action" (contact detonation). Used, among other things, to describe warheads as opposed to, for example, fragmentation action. Also called "pressure wave action".

The effect of mine shells is desirable when attacking non-reinforced and non-armoured targets such as brittle brick or concrete, and aircraft skin, as these are relatively easy to penetrate and do not need to be attacked by heavy, hard projectiles, but are tough enough to maintain their structure despite being pierced by shellfire and fragmentation. The larger explosions generated by mine shells are more efficient at inflicting damage on such targets than the greater kinetic impact but smaller detonations delivered by conventional rounds.

=== Construction ===
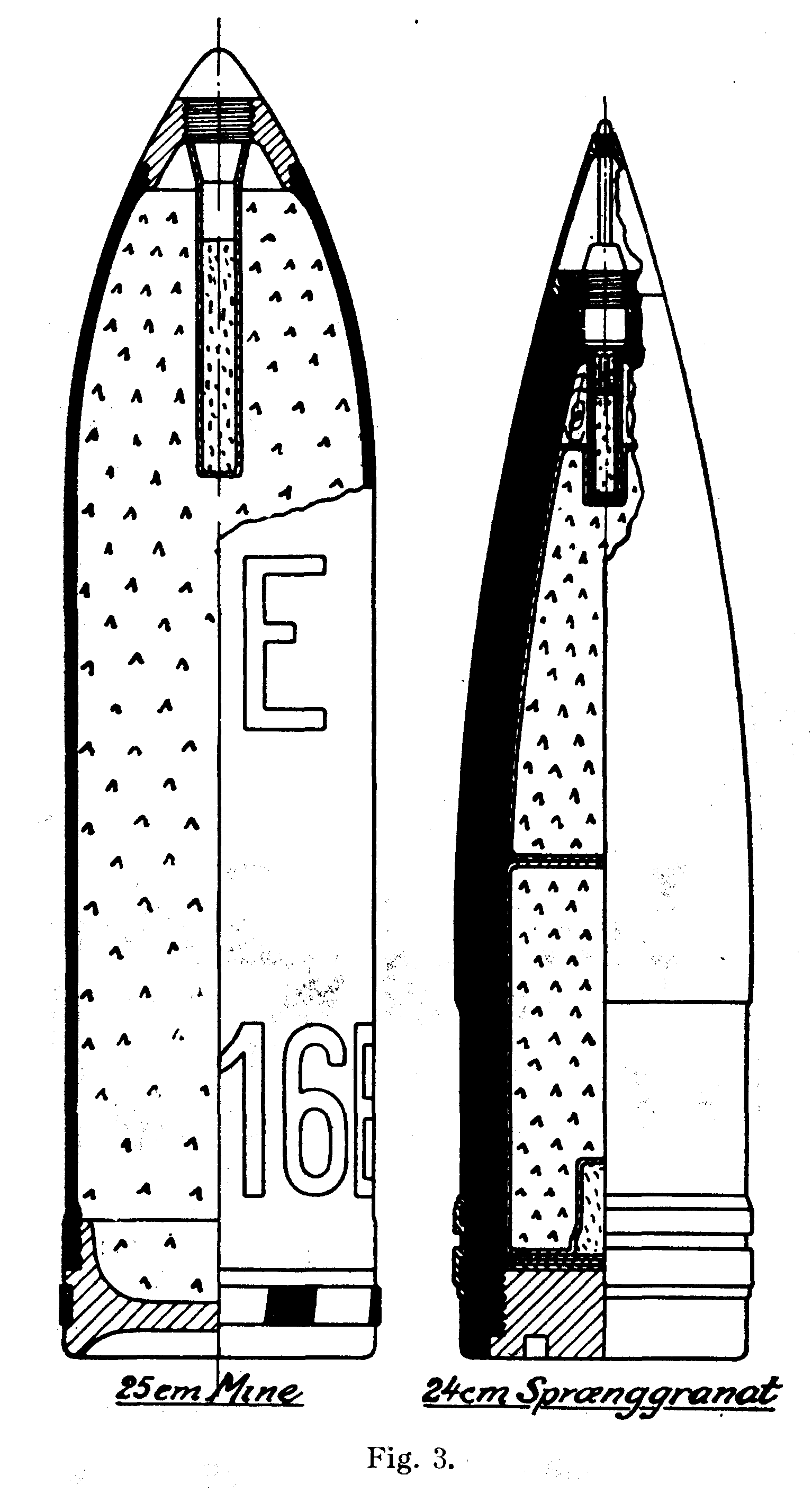
Cut-through drawing of WWI-era shell types. To the left is a 25 cm mine shell; to the right a 24 cm high-explosive shell.

To achieve this effect mine shells have very thin shell walls, leaving more room for explosive filler, at the cost of generating lighter and less damaging shrapnel (fragmentation). Shells for use against thicker targets, such as brick or concrete walls, often use a delayed action fuze allowing them to penetrate a wall before exploding, forcing larger pieces of the targets to break loose.

An additional advantage of the mine shell is that, as explosives are less dense than metal, the projectiles weigh less, giving them higher muzzle velocity than heavier shells and generating less recoil. Less desirably, the lighter shell has less momentum, and consequently shorter range. The lower recoil also makes them unsuitable to be fired from a gun with a recoil operated or advanced primer ignition mechanism suitable for heavier standard shells. This forced Germany during World War II to develop a special variant of the 20 mm MG FF cannon to fire mine shells, subsequently becoming the "MG FF/M" (for Minengeschoß).

Mine shells are often made longer than other shells of the same caliber, to increase both the weight and the explosive payload.

== Etymology ==
=== Mine shell ===
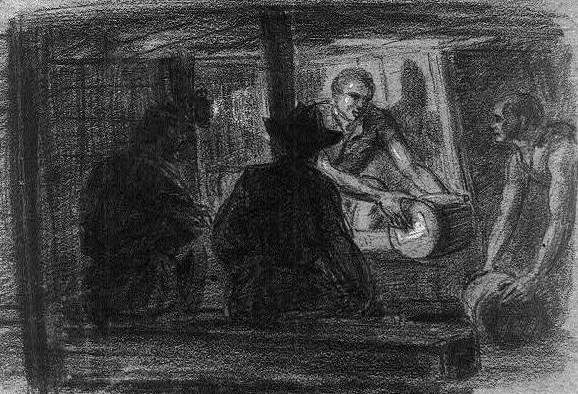
Tunnel being "mined" with explosives during the Battle of the Crater (American Civil War).

The word 'mine' in the name "mine shell" can in the modern world seem confusing, as military use of the word is mainly associated with land mines and naval mines. However the word "mine" is very old and originally had the same meaning as "mining mines". As mines were used during siege warfare in past eras to collapse fortifications, and later blowing up fortifications (see tunnel warfare), the first proto-landmines developed received the name mine. These were basic explosives dug down into the ground like a mine. This eventually led to mine-ordnance being defined as "contained explosions", which is alluded to in the name mine shell as its original purpose was to penetrate into fortification walls and burst inside.

However, as mine shells became obsolete against fortresses the definition changed with time from "shells damaging through a contained explosion" to "shells damaging through the shock wave created from the explosion of their payload, rather than the combination of fragmentation and pressure wave damage like traditional high-explosive shells, which have thicker shell walls and smaller explosive load".

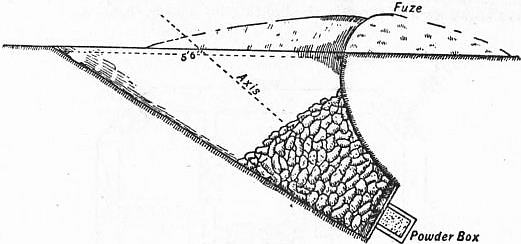
French "fougasse" mine-construction from pre-modern times. This weapon-name was later given by the French to a specific mine shell design called obus fougasse (fougasse shell).

Mine shell in other languages:

- (France) – French: obus à mine and obus fougasse for land based munition According to older French weapons standardization, the term "á mine" was used for landmines buried deeper than 3 m (9.8 ft) in the ground, while the term "fougasse" was used for landmines buried less than 3 m (9.8 ft) below the ground (see Fougasse (weapon)). This indicates that there probably were differences in effect between 'Obus á mine' and 'Obus fougasse' shells.
- (Germany) – German: Minengeschoß (M-gesch) for conventional mine shells or Minenbrandgranate (M-brgr) for incendiary mine shells
- (Hungary) – Hungarian: rombológránát, lit. 'obliterative shell'
- (Italy) – Italian: granata mina
- (Norway) – Norwegian: minegranat
- (Spain) – Spanish: granada mina
- (Sweden) – Swedish: mingranat (mingr or mgr)

=== Mine munition ===
The munition effect of mine shells is also applied to other types of ordnance than cannon shells, most notably aerial bombs:

- (United Kingdom) – English: High Capacity bomb (HC bomb)
- (Germany) – German: Minenbombe (M-bomb),
- (Russia) – Russian: фугасной авиационная бомба (ФАБ, FAB), lit. 'high capacity aerial bomb'
- (Sweden) – Swedish: minbomb (mb)

German WW2 air-to-air rockets configured with mine-shell equivalent warheads also featured "mine" in their name, such as the R4M, which was an abbreviation of Rakete, 4 Kg, Minenkopf (lit. 'Rocket, 4 kg (8.8 lb), Mine-head'). Interestingly, mine-rockets developed in Sweden after WW2 were named sprängraketer ("high-explosive rockets"), even though their initial design was directly based on the German R4M.

=== High Capacity ===
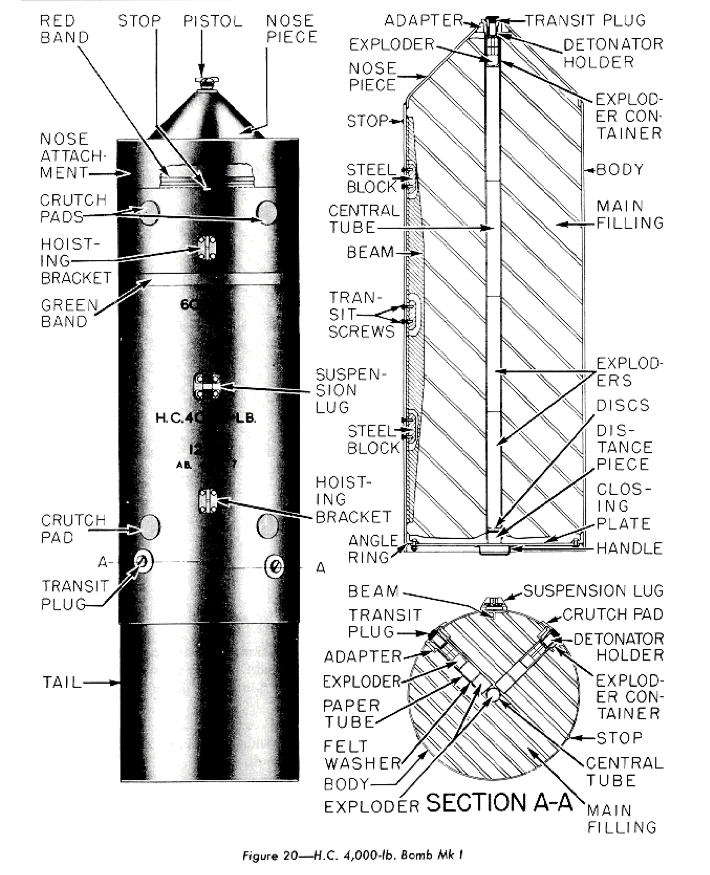
British H.C. (High Capacity) 4,400-lb bomb Mk.1

The name 'mine shell' in English is a modern term directly translated from the German military term Minengeschoß (lit. 'mine shot').

The formal English military term for "mine munition" is High Capacity (HC), with mine shells being called High-Explosive, High Capacity (HEHC), alternatively High Capacity High-Explosive (HCHE).

The UK MOD listed the following HC-abbreviations in December 2008:

- APHC – Armour-Piercing, High Capacity
- HCER – High Capacity Extended Range
- HCHE – High Capacity High-Explosive

== History ==
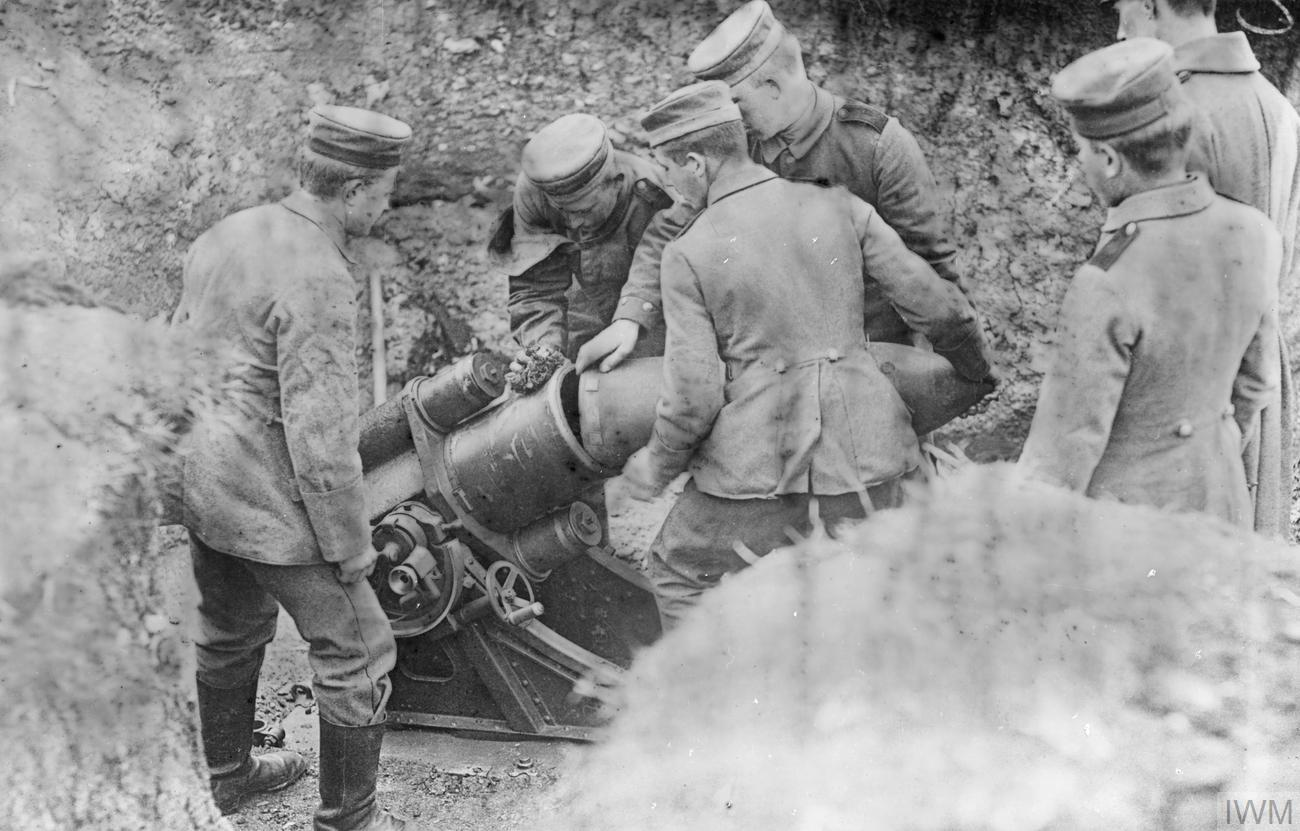
Imperial German 25 cm (9.8 in) "mine-mortar" (German: Minenwerfer) during World War I.

Dedicated mine shells originate in Europe. The origin of the name "mine shell" is unknown but Italy was using the name by 1884 (Italian: Granata Mina).

Mine shells were used in a lot of different types of high caliber cannons, howitzers, and mortars on both land and on water around the turn of the century, before seeing a decline after World War I. (See the article Minenwerfer for the use of mine shells in mortars during World War I.) The use of rebar-reinforced fortifications during World War I probably made the shell obsolete as its effect on fortifications was negated by the rebar.

=== German use of mine shells in World War II ===
During World War II, mine shells came into use originally by Germany for small-caliber (initially 20 mm) automatic weapons, both to arm the Luftwaffe's fighter aircraft and for flak. This was an innovation, as prior to this mine shells had only been constructed in large calibers. Larger shells were usually produced by casting, smaller calibers by drilling the cavity for fuse and explosives into a solid steel shot, and neither process was effective at making small projectiles with walls that were sufficiently thin yet strong enough to work as a mine shell. While small thick-walled shells fired from automatic guns performed well against ground targets, they were more limited for use against lightly-armoured aircraft.

==== Development ====
In the late 1930s, the Germans began to pay attention to these shortcomings during the trials of the 20 mm MG FF cannon. Its conventional high-explosive rounds were judged unsatisfactory in the anti-aircraft role. As a result of these trials, the German air ministry, the Reichsluftfahrtministerium, or RLM for short, ordered the development of mine shells for the 20 mm MG FF cannon in 1937. To make such shells in 20 mm (0.787 in) caliber, German ordnance engineers had to try new methods of construction; they developed a round made from high-quality drawing steel, manufactured in the same way as cartridge cases. These new 20 mm mine shells were first used against the RAF in 1940, and proved highly successful. Even when the British and later, to a limited extent the Americans equipped their fighters with autocannon, they always used conventional ammunition. The difference in payloads between these rounds and the Luftwaffe's mine shells was significant. Considering the high-explosive rounds alone as an example: the 20 mm mine shells used in MG FF/M cannons (and later in the MG 151/20) both had a 17 g (0.60 oz) HE filling (compared to the 4.5–6.5 g (0.16–0.23 oz) of the original MG-FF), while British and American autocannon shells of the same calibre, markedly heavier, could carry only 10–12 g (0.35–0.42 oz).

One problem with the new ammunition was its light weight; the new 20 mm mine shells produced insufficient recoil to operate the standard 20 mm MG FF cannon, requiring a modification of the recoil mechanism. The new cannon could not safely fire standard rounds and was renamed 20 mm MG FF/M, with M for Minengeschoß appended, a new name implying the need for different ammunition.

==== Deployment ====
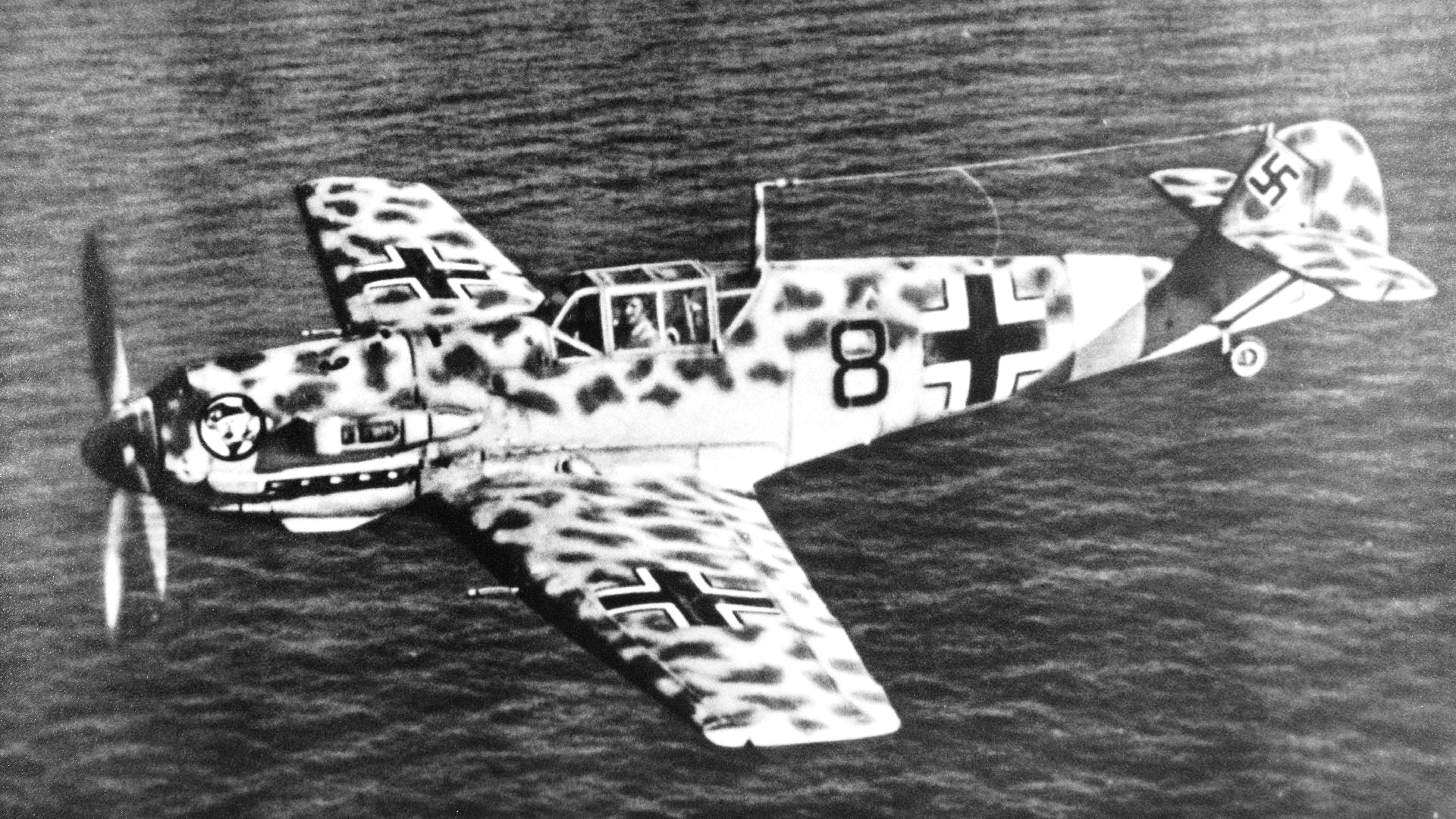
A Messerschmitt Bf 109E-4, the first Bf 109 deployed with the 20 mm MG FF/M "mine shell capable" cannon.

Germany first used Minengeschoß ammunition during the Battle of Britain when MG FF/M armed Bf 109E's and Bf 110C's flew missions over from mainland Europe to Britain. Although the shells themselves proved deadly, the guns had a poor rate of fire, relatively slow muzzle velocity, and an inadequate magazine ammunition feed, and were soon replaced by the belt-fed MG 151. This new type was originally introduced as a Minengeschoß-firing 15 mm heavy machine gun, but it was then realised that the earlier cannon-sized mine shells were more effective, and so a new larger cartridge (20x82mm) was created for the weapon. The adapted gun, designated MG 151/20, became the Luftwaffe's standard 20 mm autocannon until the end of the war, and with its high fire rate coupled with good ballistics and high-explosives payload for its caliber was overall among the best aircraft armament of the conflict.

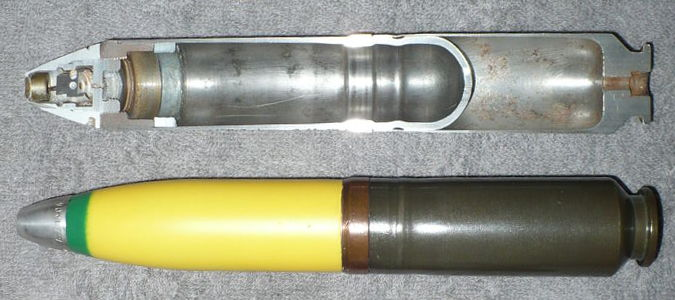
German 30x90mmRB mm rounds as used by the MK 108 cannon. The sectioned round is a mine shell (Minengeschoss).

As the possibilities of this new application for mine shells became better understood, the Luftwaffe found they had created a potential game-changer as the recoil/velocity ratio made it possible to create larger caliber guns that would have low enough recoil to be effectively mounted on conventional aircraft, while at the same time achieving useful velocities. Larger-diameter cannon shells allowed a dramatic increase in explosive payload. One such weapon was the 30 mm (1.18 in) MK 108 which became highly militarily significant during the second half of the war, when the Allies began to mount their enormous bombing onslaught on German cities. So large was the increase in internal volume that it proved worthwhile to the Germans to refine these projectiles by making them more streamlined, sacrificing a little of this capacity, but thus partly compensating for the lower momentum characteristic of the Minengeschoß design. These streamlined mine shells for the 30 mm MK 108 were designated Ausf.C. and contained 72 grams (2.54 ounces) of nitropenta (PETN) instead of the 85 grams (3.00 ounces) of the original blunt-nosed Ausf.A. (The Ausf.B was a training shell without explosive payload.) See below for a comparison with modern ammunition loads.

Mine shells where also adopted for use in ground attack cannons such as the high-velocity 30 mm MK 103 and others, as well as anti-aircraft guns like the 2 cm Flak 30/38, 3.7 cm Flak 18/36/37/43 and 5 cm FlaK 41.

==== Further development ====
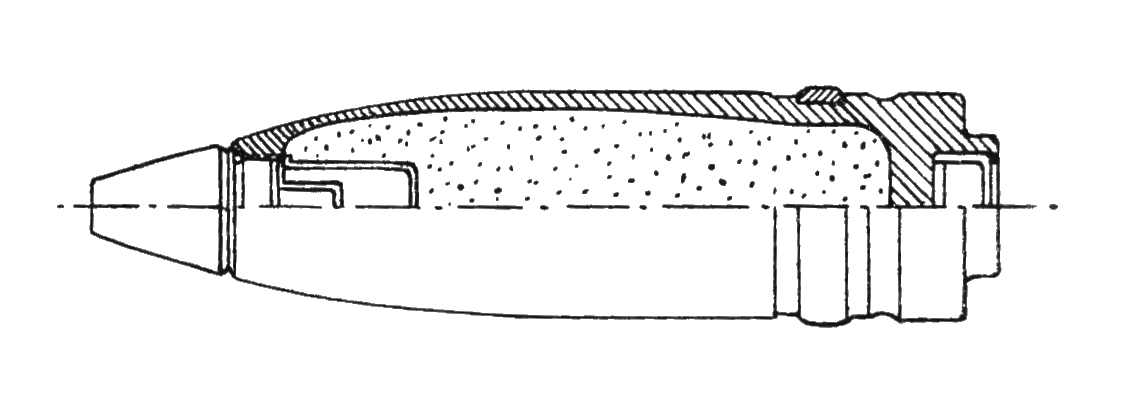
German 55 mm mine shell design from WWII.

Towards the end of WWII the Germans started to develop several autocannons in 55 mm (2.17 in) caliber for use in aircraft and anti-aircraft guns against allied aircraft. These included the Gerät 58 anti-aircraft gun and the MK 112 and MK 115 aircraft cannons. 55 mm was the smallest caliber that could shoot down a heavy bomber with a single mine shell. Calculations and tests had found that a single hit with 400 grams (0.882 pounds) of PETN or RDX explosive mixes could effectively incapacitate a heavy bomber. It was calculated that a caliber of at least 55 mm (2.17 in) was needed to deliver this load. Germany already manufactured mine shells in 50 mm (1.97 in) caliber for guns such as the 5 cm FlaK 41, but these only had an explosive charge capacity of 360 grams (0.794 pounds).

In the end, no 55 mm mine shells seem to have been deployed by Germany during World War II. The allied bombing of Germany delayed weapons research and made production of the 55 mm weapons impossible.

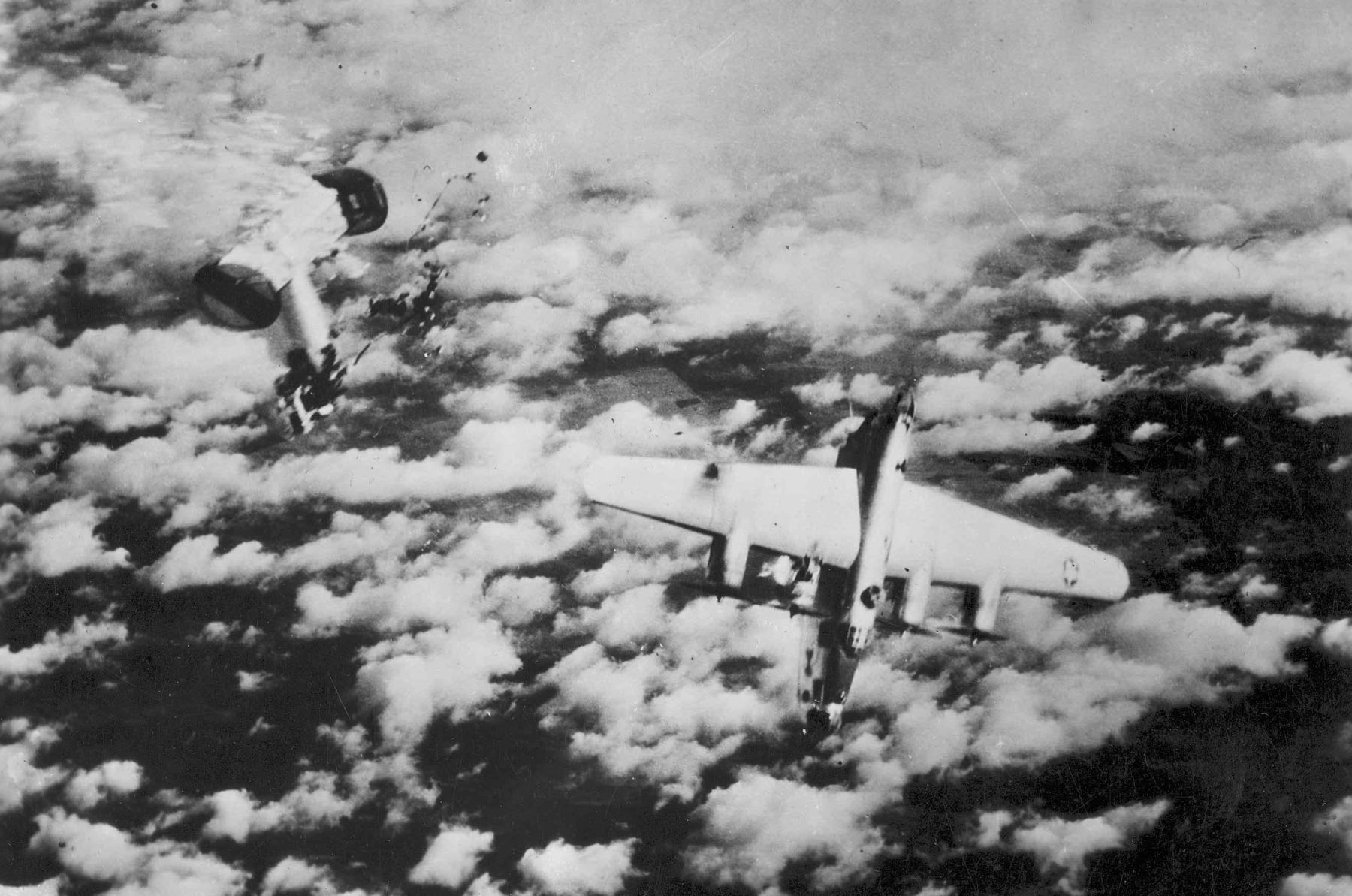
B-24 Liberator bomber shot down by a 55 mm R4M mine-warhead air-to-air rocket.

However, the Germans did manage to deploy a 55 mm air-to-air rocket named "Rakete, 4 Kg, Minenkopf" (Rocket, 4 kg, Mine-head), or R4M for short, at the end of 1944. It was fitted with a 55 mm "high-capacity", or "mine" warhead filled with 520 grams of the "HTA 41" (also known as "HTA 15") explosive-mixture, which consists of 40% Hexogen (RDX), 45% TNT and 15% aluminium. The shell walls of the warhead were only 0.8 mm (0.0315 in) thick. These rockets were fitted to several German aircraft at the end of the war, most notably the Me 262 jet fighter, which used them to great effect during their limited service life. On one occasion, Me 262s armed with R4M rockets shot down 25 B-17 bombers out of a group of 425 within a very short time without any losses.

=== Post-war use ===
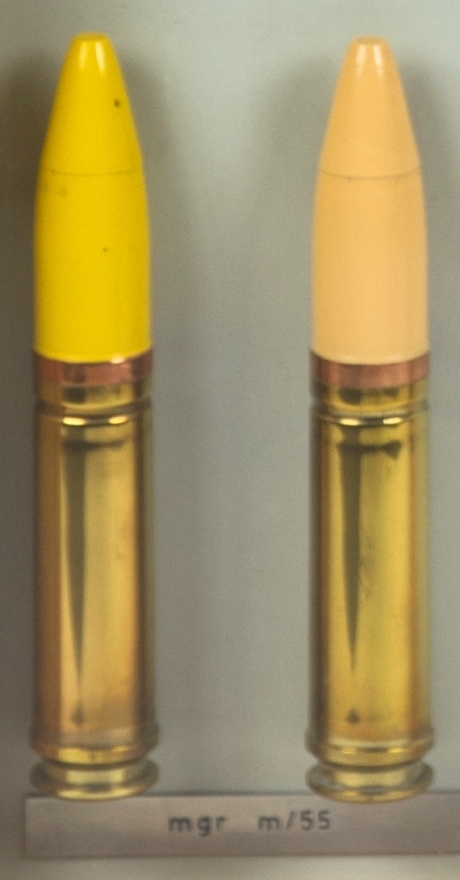
Swedish 30 mm mine shells in 30 × 111 mm J for use in the 30 mm ADEN Mk3 cannon. Left: Swedish production Right: British production

After the defeat of Germany in World War II, several countries started using mine shells for their own post-war aircraft and anti-aircraft armament; for example the "high-explosive" shells of Britain's ADEN cannon and the French DEFA 540 were effectively clones of German wartime equivalents. The guns themselves were developments of the German Mauser MK 213.

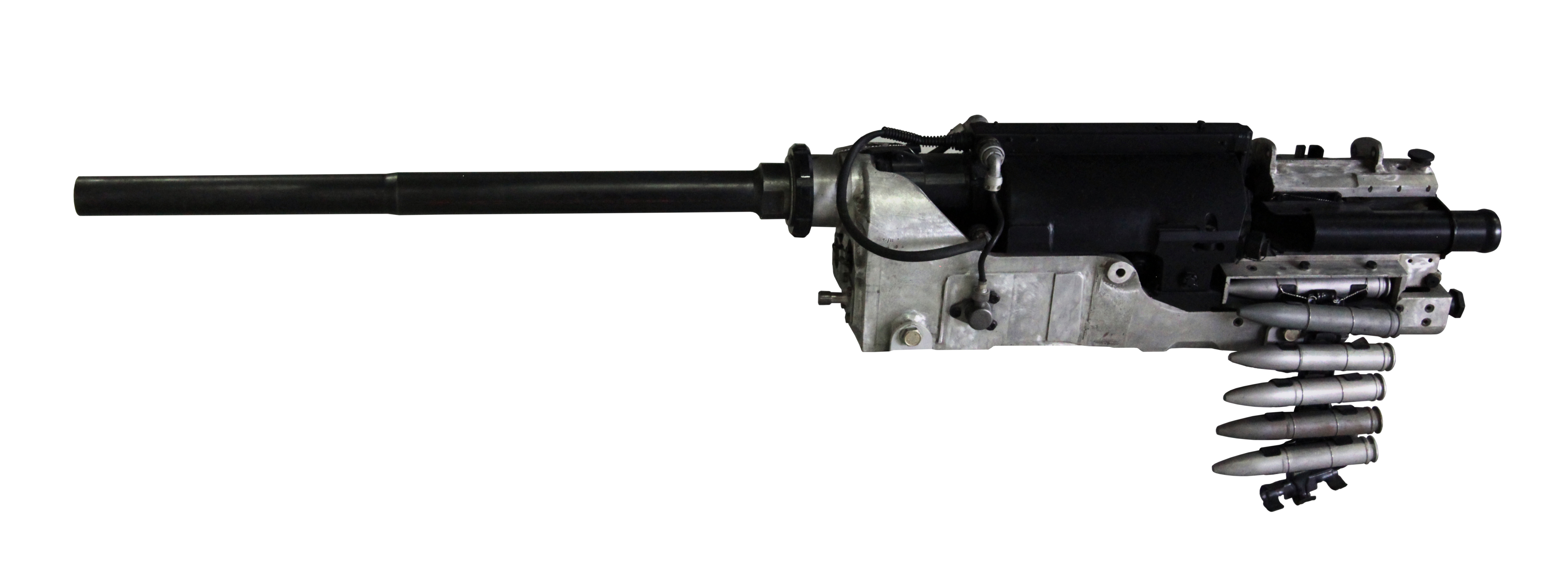
British 30 mm ADEN cannon, developed from the German Mauser MG 213 to fire mine shells.

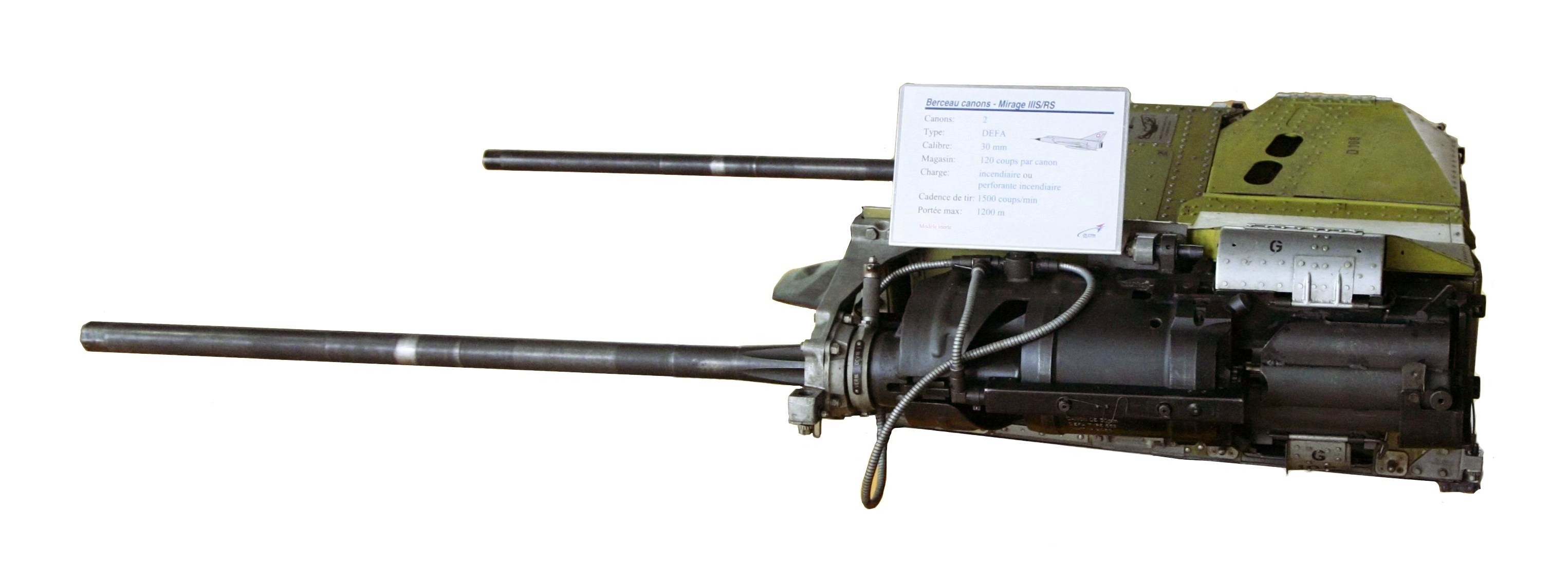
French 30 mm DEFA cannon, , developed from the German Mauser MG 213 to fire mine shells.

Some WW2 mine shell payloads were significantly larger than modern equivalents. The 58 g (2.05 oz)payload PGU-13/B HEI round for the GAU-8/A Avenger gun of the A-10 Warthog and the 48.5 g (1.71 oz) payload 30 mm OFZ shell of Russian GSh-30-1 and GSh-30-6 cannons are lower than the 72–85 g (2.54–3.00 oz) payload of German WW2 mine shells of the same caliber.

Sweden, having experience with the shell type from earlier, developed several different mine shells in different calibers after the war, including mine shell variants for the 20 x 110 Hispano cartridge and the 57 x 230R Bofors cartridge.

Mine shells are still used today in autocannons such as the Mauser BK-27, but not by artillery.

== Guns adapted to fire mine shells ==
Aircraft weapons

- 20 mm MG FF/M cannon
- 20 mm MG 151 cannon
- 20 mm Mauser MG 213
- 20 mm Hispano-Suiza HS.404
- 27 mm Mauser BK-27
- 30 mm MK 101 cannon
- 30 mm MK 103 cannon
- 30 mm MK 108 cannon
- 30 mm Mauser MK 213
- 30 mm ADEN cannon
- 30 mm DEFA cannon
- 30 mm Oerlikon KCA
- 37 mm BK 3,7
- 50 mm Rheinmetall BK-5
- 50 mm MK 214A cannon

Anti-air weapons

- 2 cm Flak 30, Flak 38 and Flakvierling 38
- 3.7 cm Flak 18/36/37
- 3.7 cm Flak 43
- 5 cm FlaK 41
- R4M

Artillery weapons

- 7.58 cm Minenwerfer
- 9.15 cm leichtes Minenwerfer System Lanz
- 17 cm mittlerer Minenwerfer
- 22.5 cm Minenwerfer M 15
- 24 cm schwerer LadungsWerfer Ehrhardt
- 24 cm schwere Flügelminenwerfer IKO
- 24 cm schwere FlügelMinenWerfer Albrecht
- 240 mm Trench Mortar
- 9.45-inch Heavy Mortar
- 25 cm schwerer Minenwerfer
- 28 cm howitzer L/10

== See also ==
- High-explosive incendiary
- High-explosive incendiary/armor-piercing ammunition
- Raufoss Mk 211
