= Minenwerfer =

Class of German mortars

Minenwerfer
Mine shell mortar
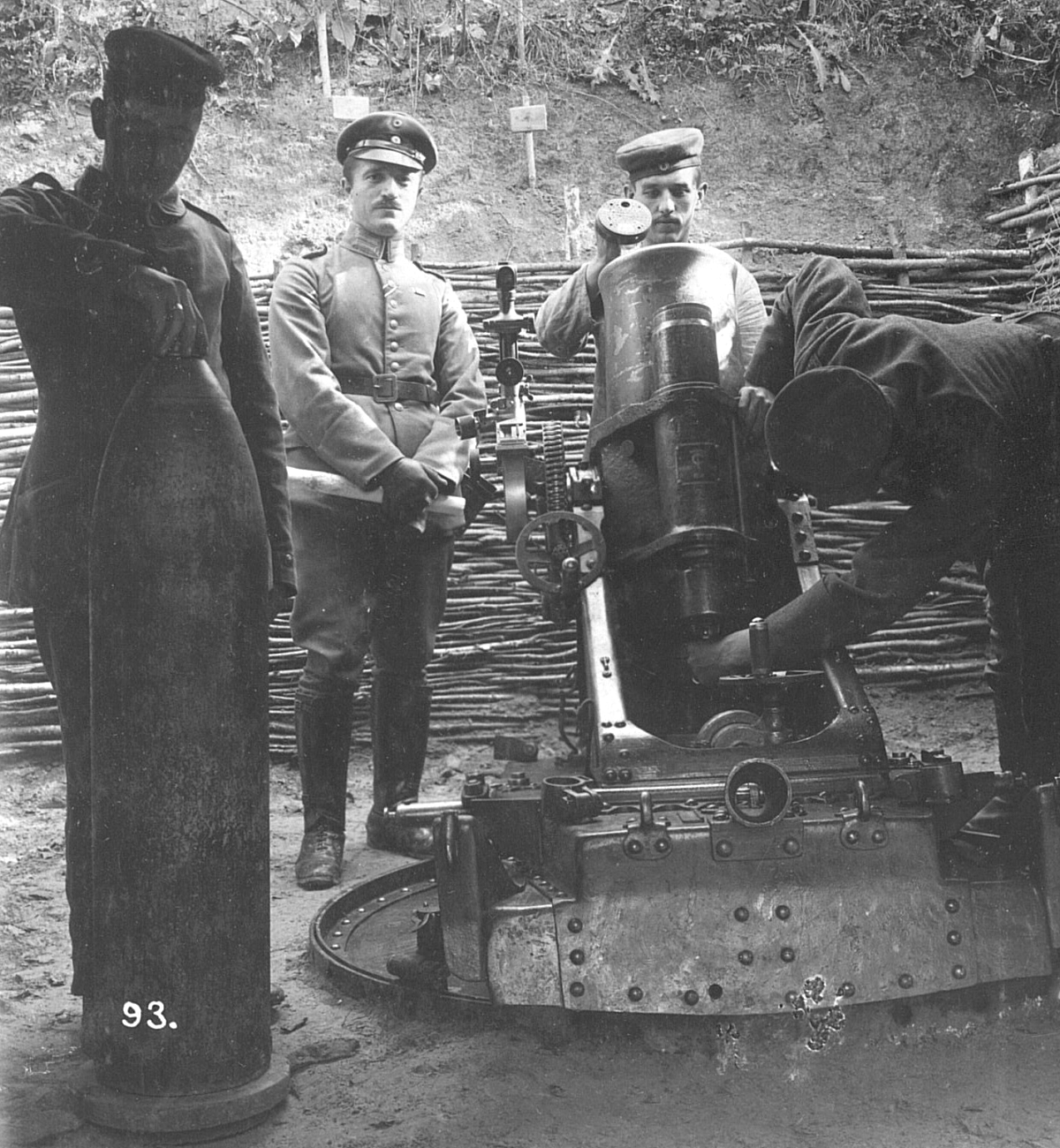
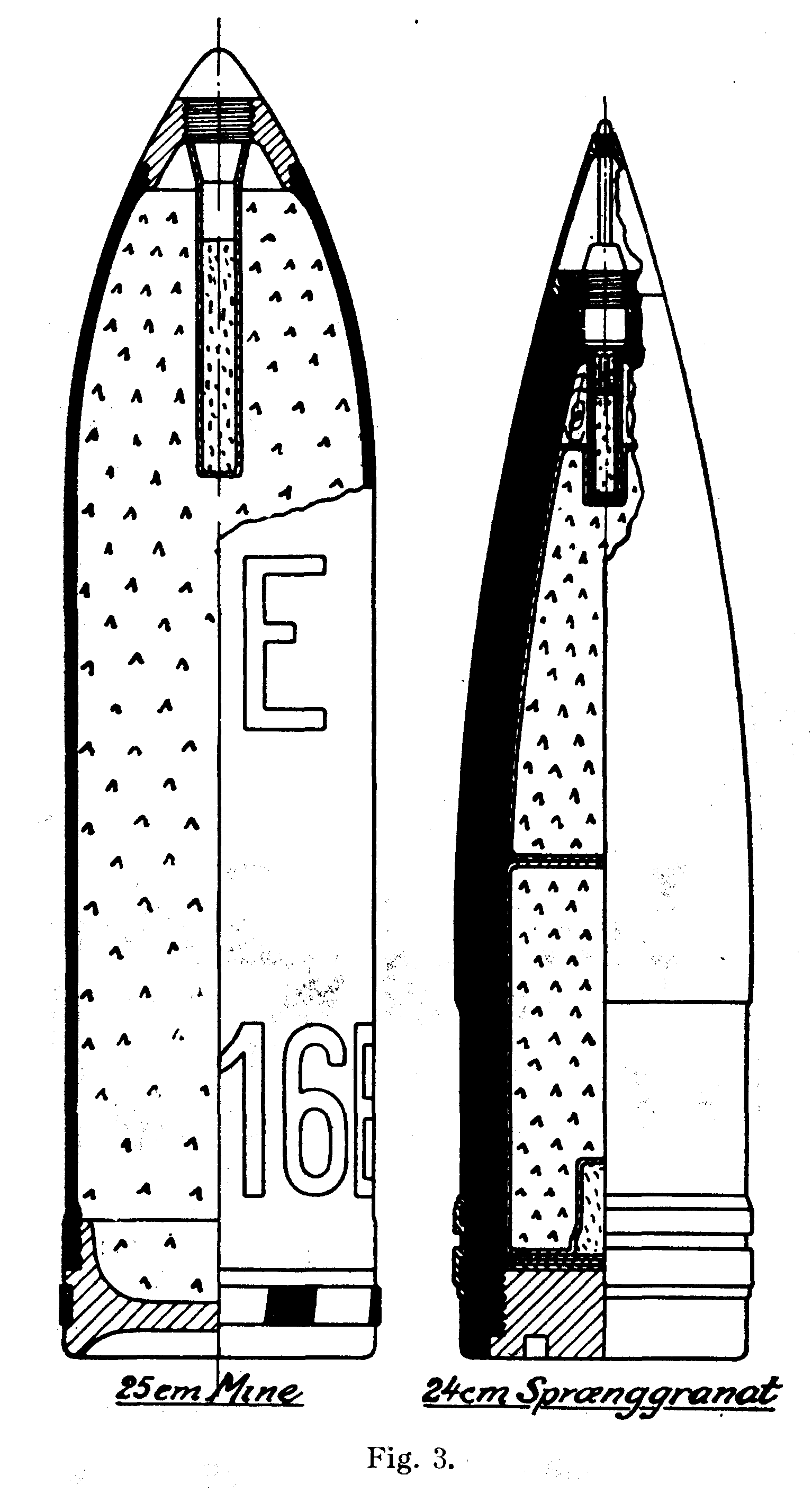
Left image: Imperial German 25 cm schwerer Minenwerfer during World War I. The left soldier is showing a 25 cm (9.8 in) mine shell as used in the artillery piece.

Right image: Drawing of sectioned World War I-era shell types. The left shell is a 25 cm (9.8 in) Minenwerfer mine shell. The right shell is a 24 cm (9.4 in) conventional high-explosive shell for comparison.

Minenwerfer ("mine launcher" or "mine thrower") is the German name for a class of short-range mine shell launching mortars used extensively during the First World War by the Imperial German Army. The weapons were intended to be used by engineers to clear obstacles, including bunkers and barbed wire, that longer range artillery would not be able to target accurately.

== Background ==
The Germans studied the Siege of Port Arthur, where heavy artillery had been unable to destroy defensive structures like barbed wire and bunkers. The German Military Ingenieurkomitee ("Engineer committee") began working with Rheinmetall to study the problem in 1907. The solution they developed was a short-barrelled rifled muzzle-loading mortar for mine shell ammunition, built in three sizes. In 1910, the largest of these was introduced as the 25 cm schwerer Minenwerfer (abbreviated "sMW"; English: "25 cm (9.8 in) heavy mine launcher"). Despite weighing only 955 kg (2,105 lb), it had the same effect on targets as the 28 cm (11 in) and 30.5 cm (12.0 in) mortars, which weighed ten times as much.

== Combat history ==
At the outbreak of the First World War, the German army had 160 minenwerfers. They were used successfully in Belgium at Liège and Namur, and against the French fortress of Maubeuge. After a few months, when trench warfare started, the German infantry began calling for short-range weapons, and the minenwerfer entered the battle. Before long, Allied forces were demanding similar devices. A captured minenwerfer was taken to the Royal Artillery Woolwich establishment in London in November 1914 and 100 copies rushed to the front by Christmas. By mid-1916 there were 281 heavy, 640 medium, and 763 light minenwerfers in service, with 4,300 new weapons being produced every month.

With this powerful armory of short-range artillery, the German forces were able to reach across No Man's Land and bring a punishing fire to bear on any target that presented itself. When chemical warfare arrived, the minenwerfer was a highly convenient method of delivering gas. The first German use of gas was in 1915 during the Battle of Bolimów in Poland on January 31. The German army shelled the Russian positions with xylyl bromide, the attack was relatively unsuccessful due to the low temperature, which prevented the gas from vaporizing and spreading.

== Development ==
The medium version, the 17 cm mittlerer Minenwerfer (mMW; "17 cm (6.7 in) mid-sized mine launcher"), was introduced in 1913. The model remained in reserve service until 1939–40. The light version of the weapon, the 7.58 cm leichter Minenwerfer (lMW; "light mine launcher"), was still at the prototype stage when the war started, but rapidly entered production. The weapon was far more efficient than its artillery counterpart: in comparison, the 7.7 cm (3.0 in) FK 96 n/A needed to be towed by a team of six horses, compared with a single horse for the lMW; additionally, the lMW could be moved around the battlefield by four men. The minenwerfer was cheaper, costing only one-seventh as much as the artillery gun, as did its ammunition.

Since the muzzle velocity, and thus firing shock, of minenwerfers was low, a variety of explosives that would usually be unsuitable for use in artillery was used to fill the shells. In any case, TNT explosive was reserved for use in artillery shells. Typically, the explosives used in minenwerfer shells were ammonium nitrate-carbon explosives. However, the sensitivity of the explosives occasionally made them detonate in the tube. There were a large number of these incidents, one of which claimed the life of Karl Völler, head designer of Rheinmetall, in 1916. These problems, however, were eventually overcome.

Recognizing the numerous advantages of the minenwerfer in trench warfare, production was stepped up and, by 1918, the numbers had increased dramatically to 1,234 heavy, 2,361 medium and 12,329 light minenwerfer. A 38 cm (15 in) calibre sehr schwerer Minenwerfer (ssMW; English: "very heavy mine launcher") was also developed.

== Gallery ==
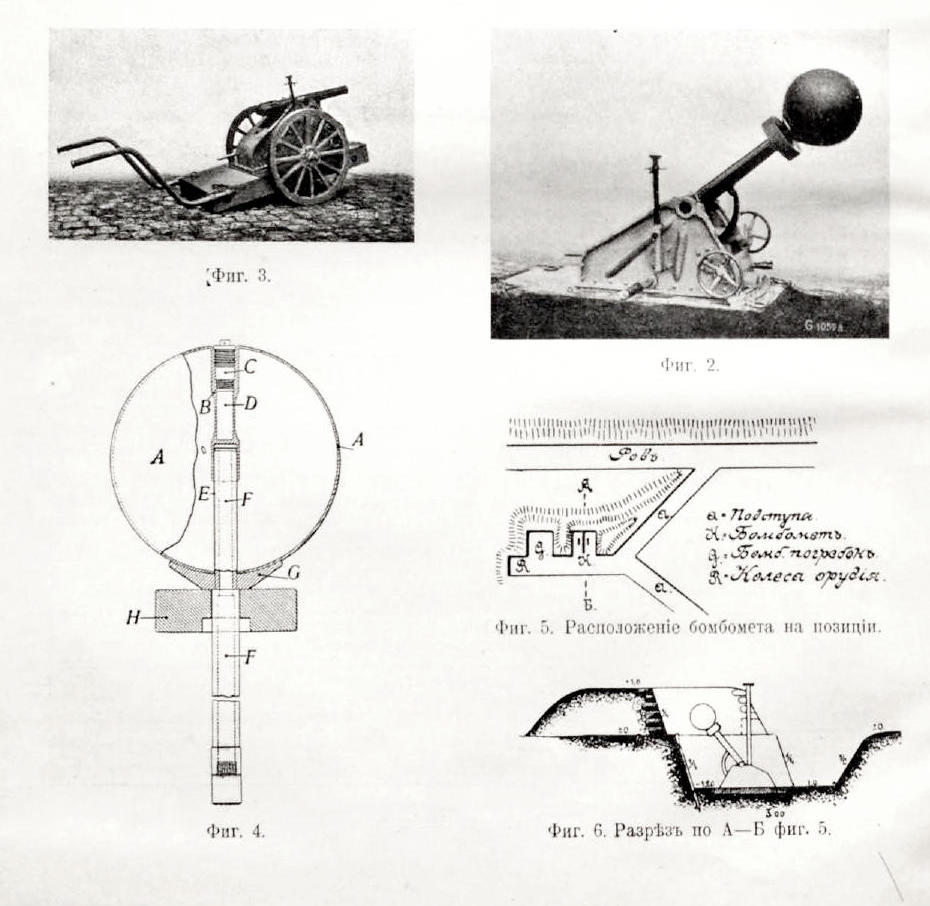
Early Krupp MinenWerfers

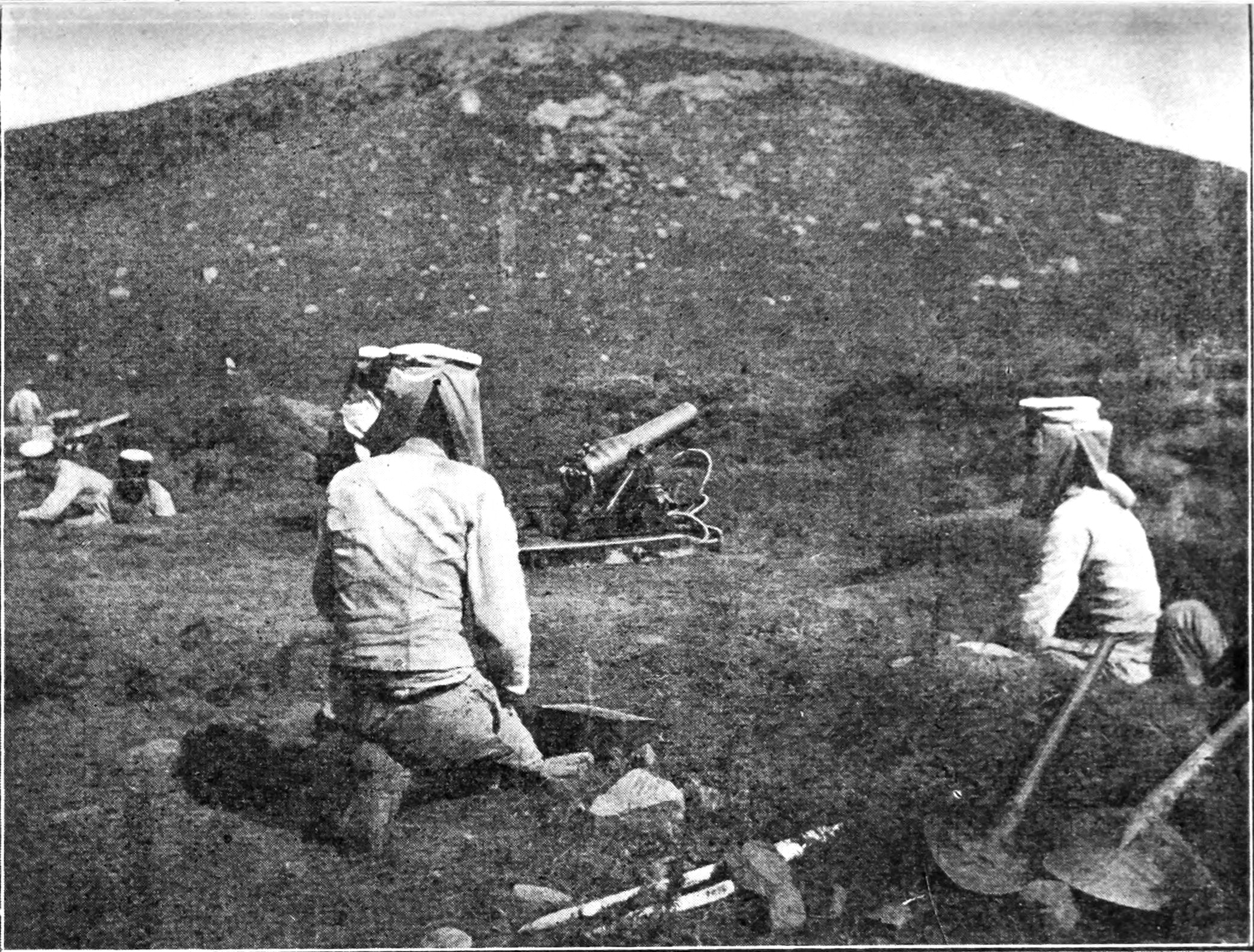
Japanese troops using a mortar during the Russo-Japanese War

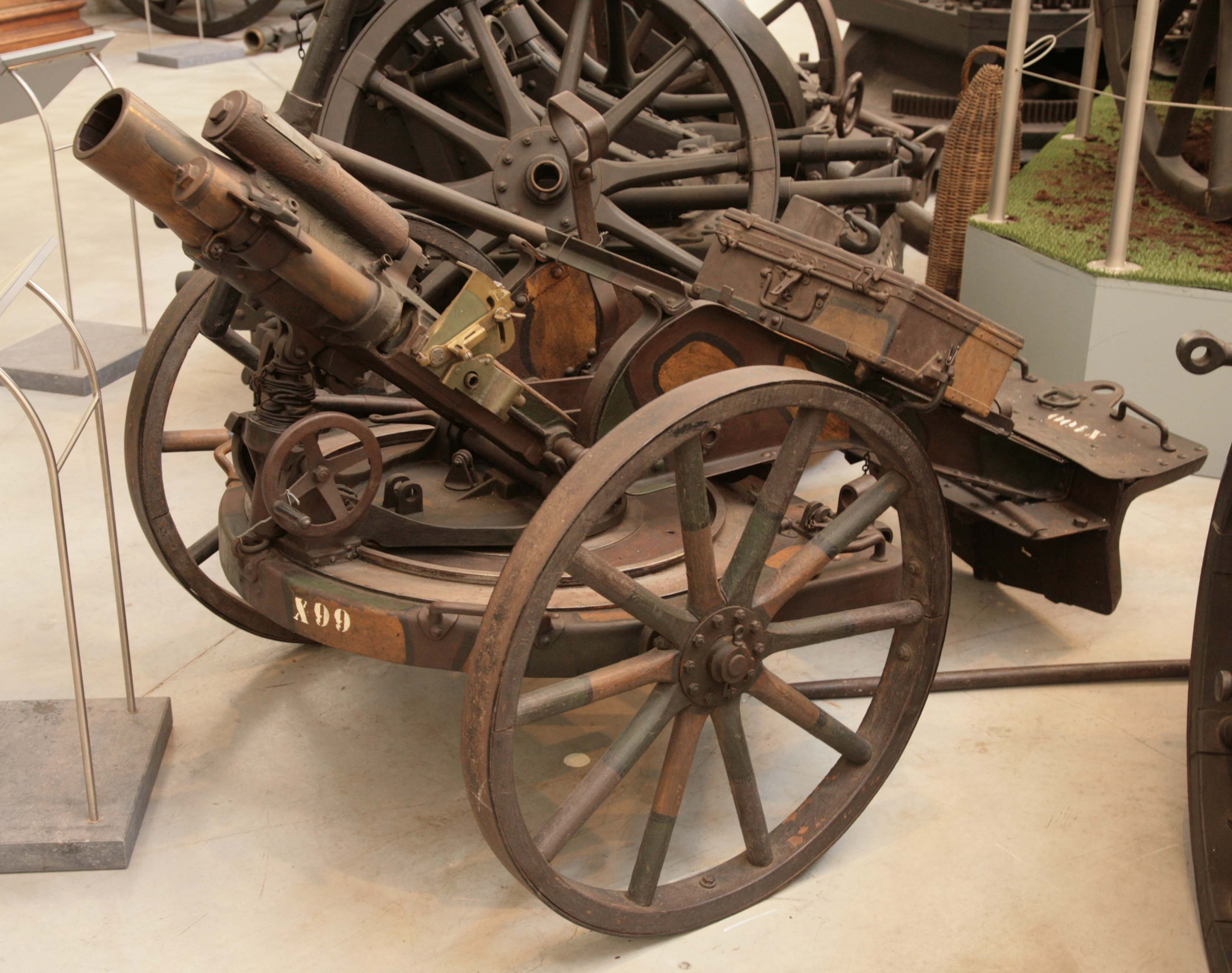
German 7.5 cm MinenWerfer, World War I

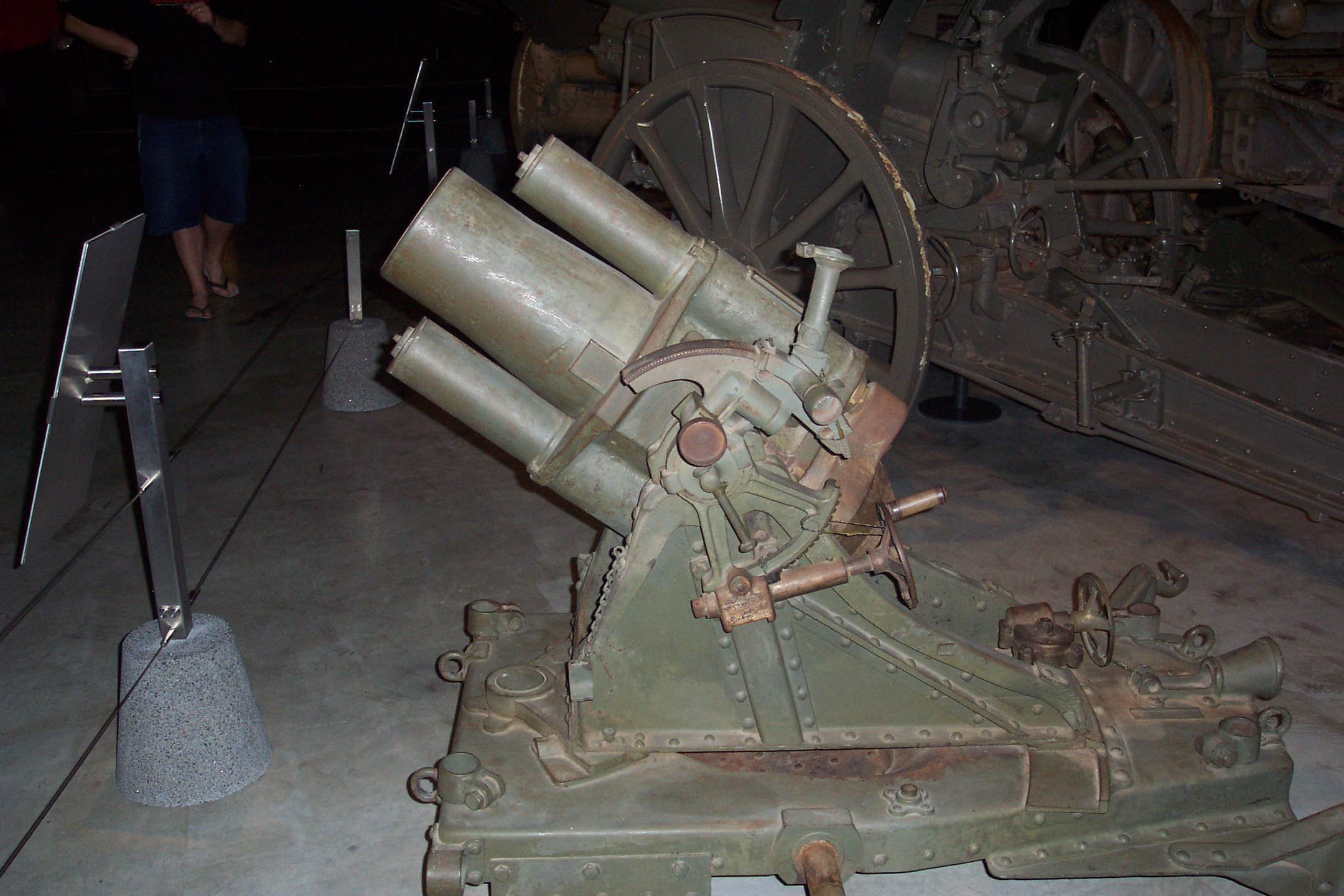
17 cm nMW nA

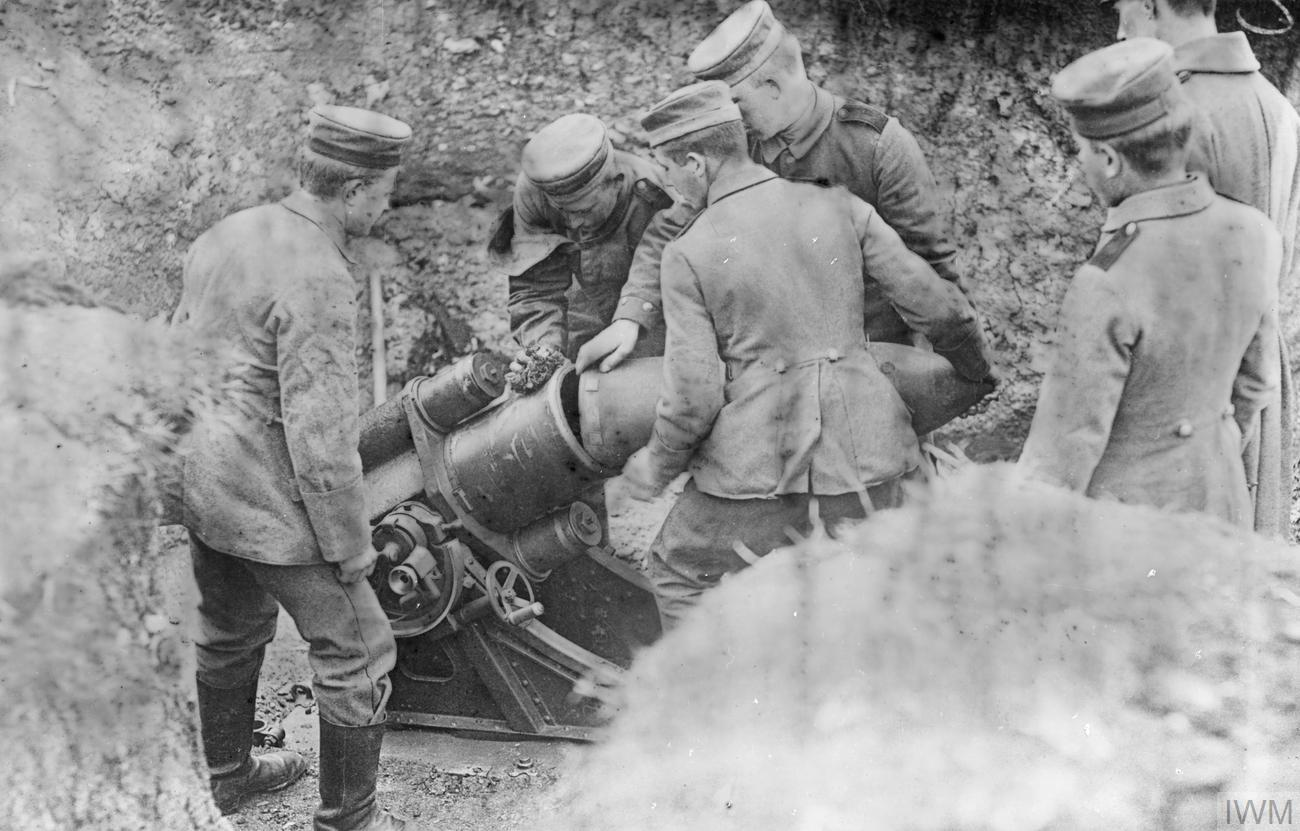
German soldiers loading a 25 cm MinenWerfer, World War I

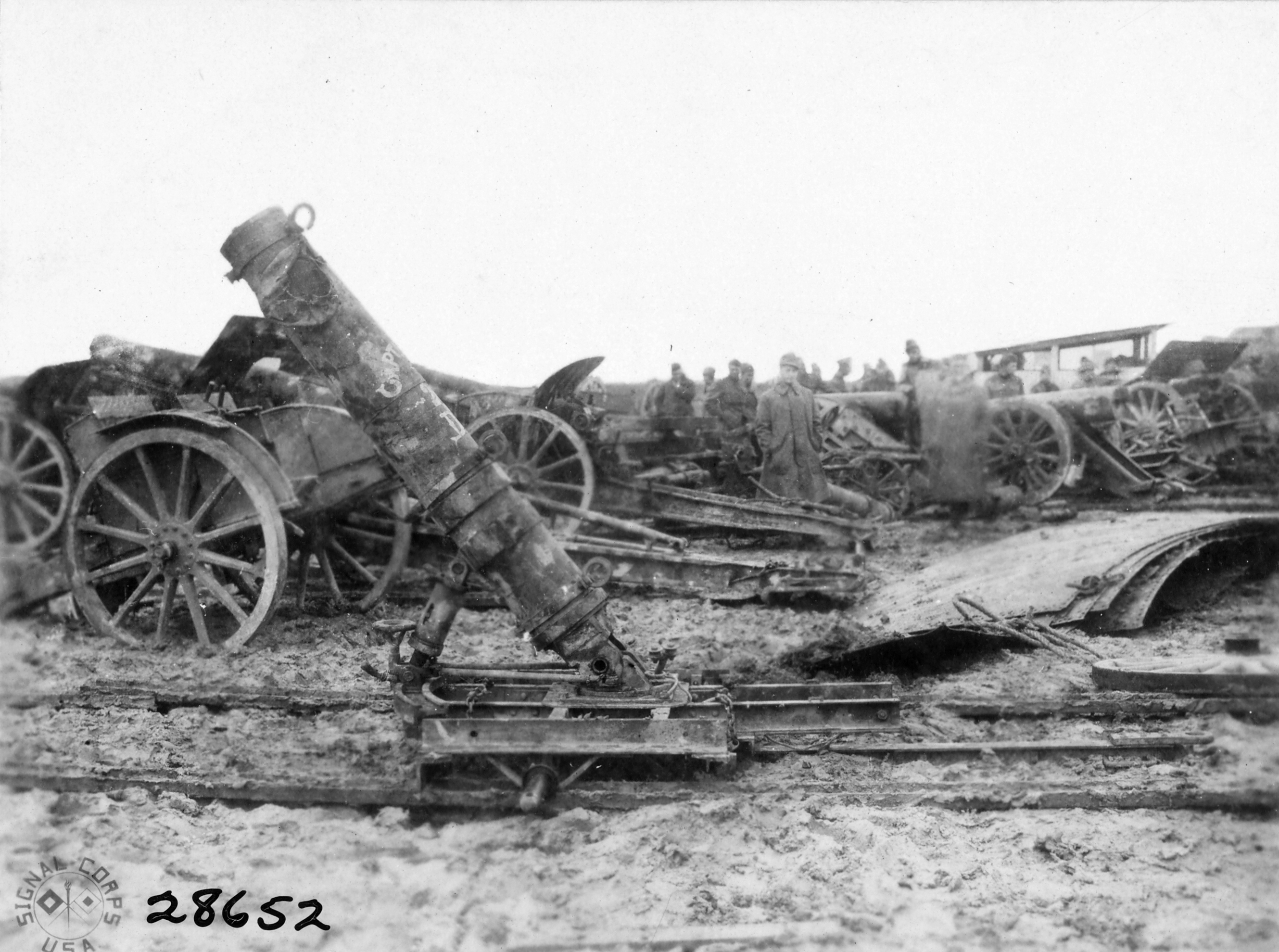
24 cm schwerer FlügelMinenWerfer IKO

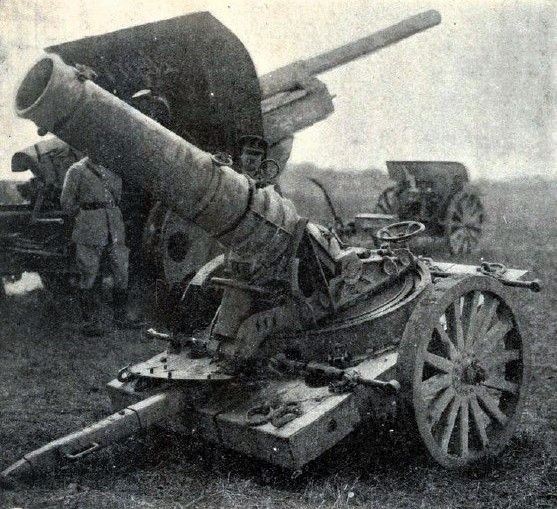
24 cm schwerer FlügelMinenWerfer Albrecht

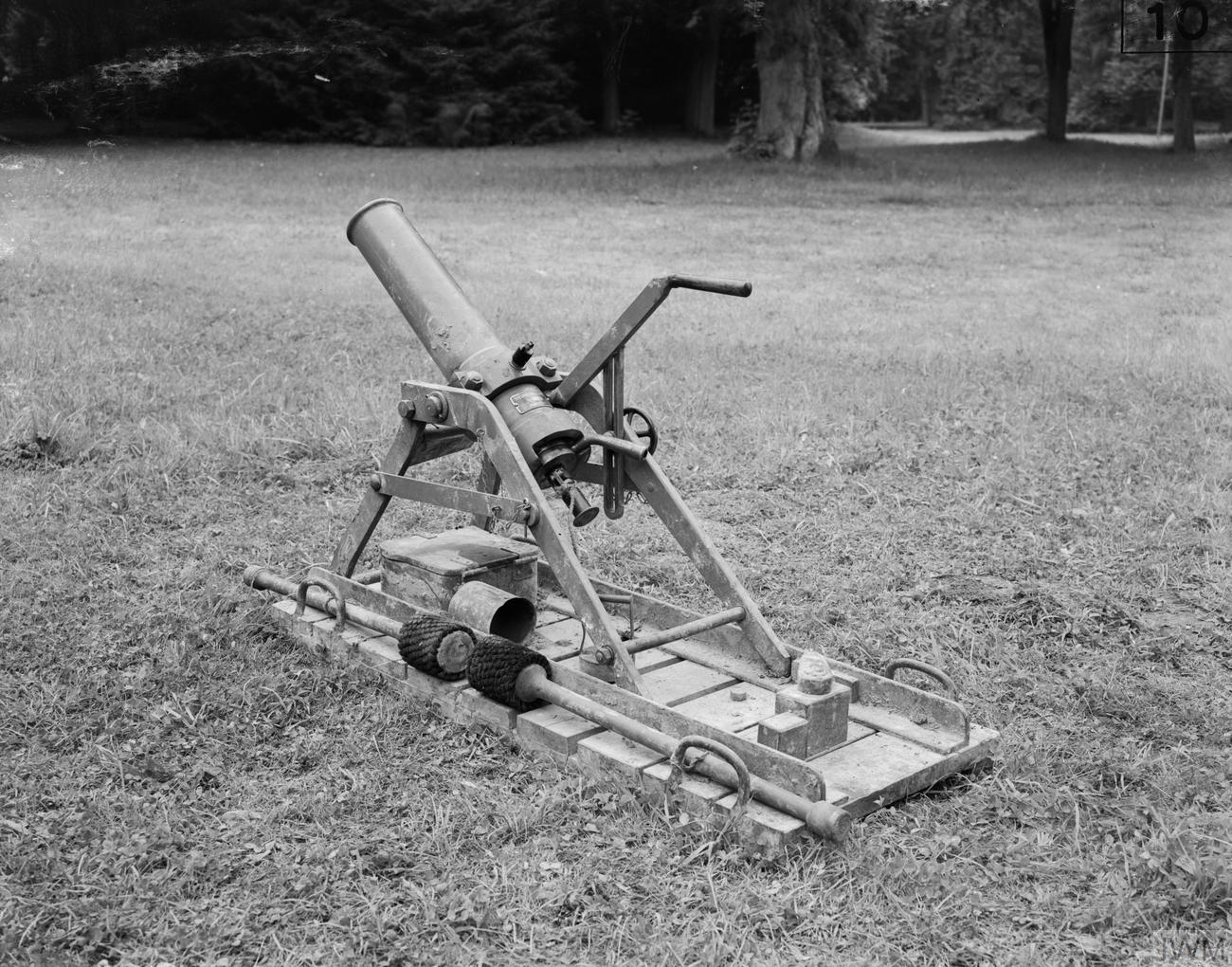
A Minenwerfer Lanz 91

== See also ==
- Granatenwerfer 16
- 9.15 cm leichtes Minenwerfer System Lanz
- 24 cm schwerer LadungsWerfer Ehrhardt
- 24 cm schwere Flügelminenwerfer IKO
- 24 cm schwere FlügelMinenWerfer Albrecht
- Albrecht Mortar
