= 24 cm schwere FlügelMinenWerfer Albrecht =

German heavy mortar used in World War I

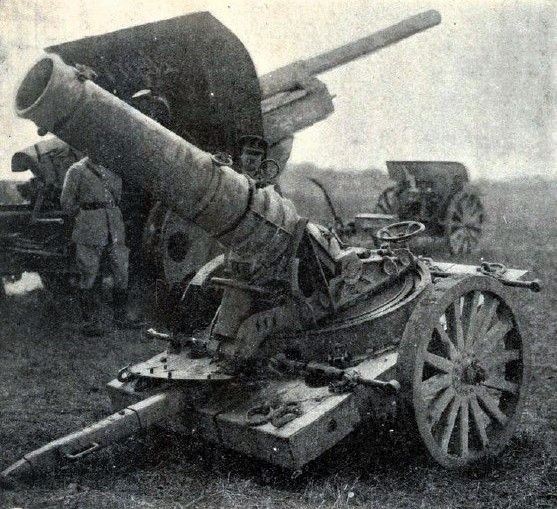
- Type: Heavy mortar
- Place of origin: German Empire

Service history
- In service: 1917–1918
- Used by: German Empire
- Wars: World War I

Production history
- Designer: Albrecht
- Produced: 1917

Specifications
- Mass: 1,600 kg (3,500 lb)
- Barrel length: 1.5 m (4 ft 11 in)
- Shell: Separate loading charge and 100 kg (220 lb) projectile
- Caliber: 24 cm (9.4 in)
- Recoil: None
- Carriage: Two wheeled
- Traverse: 360°
- Muzzle velocity: 150 m/s (490 ft/s)
- Effective firing range: 2 km (1.2 mi)

The 24 cm schwere FlügelMinenWerfer Albrecht (heavy mortar launcher), or 24 cm sFIMW 17 Albrecht, was a heavy mortar used by the Imperial German Army during the First World War.

== History ==
Although the majority of combatants had heavy field artillery before the outbreak of the First World War, none had adequate numbers in service, nor had they foreseen the growing importance of heavy artillery once the Western Front stagnated and trench warfare set in.

Besides land mines, machine guns, and trenches, barbed wire was a persistent threat to attacking infantry. Often barbed wire was used to channel attackers away from vulnerable areas of defenders trenches and funnel attackers into predefined kill zones where overlapping fields of machine-gun fire could be brought to bear. Rows of barbed wire could also be used to delay attackers allowing defenders time to man their trenches and to hold attackers at a safe distance to allow defenders to call in defensive artillery fire.

What was needed to overcome the deadlock and give attackers an advantage was light, portable, simple, and inexpensive heavy firepower. A way to provide this was by designing a series of heavy trench mortars which could be brought to forward area trenches to launch heavy, short-ranged preparatory bombardments to clear obstacles and neutralize dug-in enemy defenses.

== Design ==
Inspired by the success of the French Mortier de 240 mm introduced in 1915 the Imperial German Army's Ingenieur Komitee (Engineering Committee) or "IKO" submitted the design for a closely related heavy mortar the 24 cm schwere FlügelMinenWerfer IKO. Great Britain, Italy, the United States, and the Austro-Hungarian Empire also produced their versions of the Mortier de 240 mm.

Like the IKO the Albrecht mortar was a muzzle-loaded smoothbore weapon that used separate loading propellant charges and projectiles. It had a two-part barrel that could be disassembled for transport that screwed into a swivel base that sat on either a circular or crescent-shaped steel platform. The circular base can be seen here at the Royal Museum of the Armed Forces and Military History, Brussels, Belgium and the crescent base can be seen here at the Gunfire Museum, Brasschaat, Belgium . The steel platform then sat on a carriage built from heavy timbers to absorb the recoil. The carriage had an axle that could be connected to two wooden-spoked steel-rimmed wheels for towing. The traverse and elevation mechanism was more robust than the IKO but the Albrecht was 1,010 kg (2,230 lb) heavier. However, the Albrecht mortar had a maximum range 450 m (490 yd) greater than the IKO.

The Albrecht mortar was loaded by sliding a propellant charge down the muzzle of the mortar and then a percussion cap was screwed into the base. A four-finned mortar bomb was then slid down the tube and the mortar was fired by a lanyard that ignited the percussion cap and propellant. Both the IKO and Albrecht used the same ammunition. Approximately 700 IKO and Albrecht mortars were produced during the war.

== See also ==
- 24 cm Minenwerfer M.16 - Austrian equivalent
- 240 mm Trench Mortar - French equivalent
- 9.45-inch Heavy Mortar - British equivalent

== Gallery ==
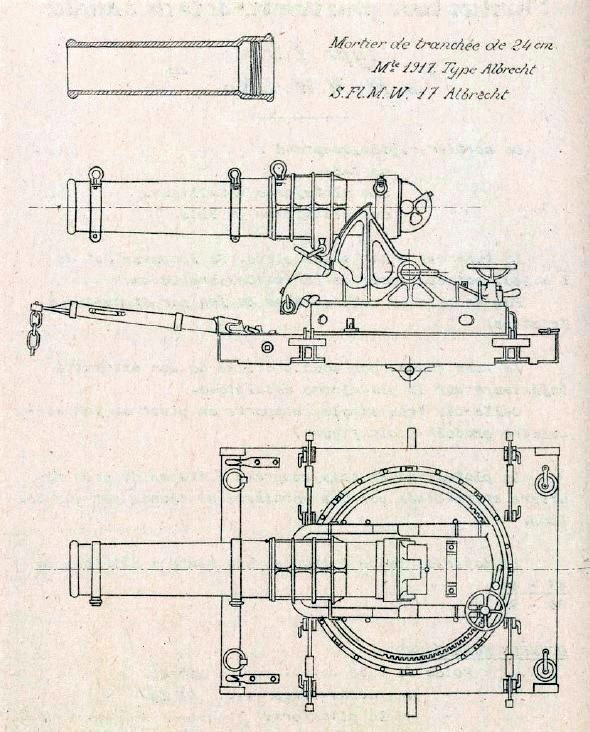
A drawing of the Albrecht mortar

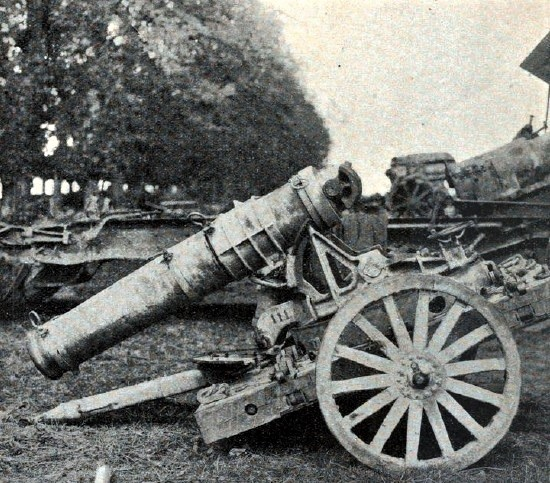
A captured Albrecht mortar

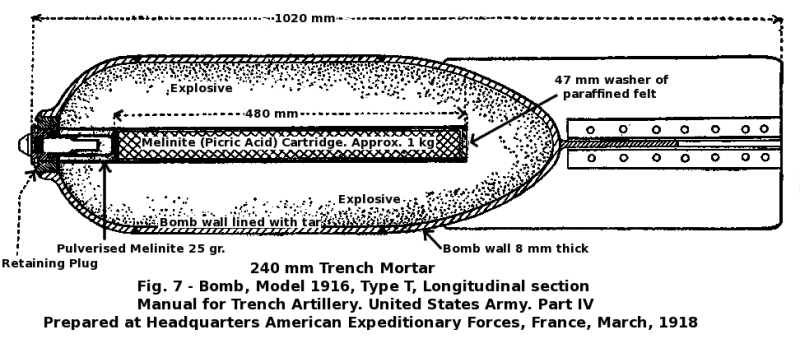
A drawing of an American 240 mm mortar bomb. The projectile for the Albrecht was very similar

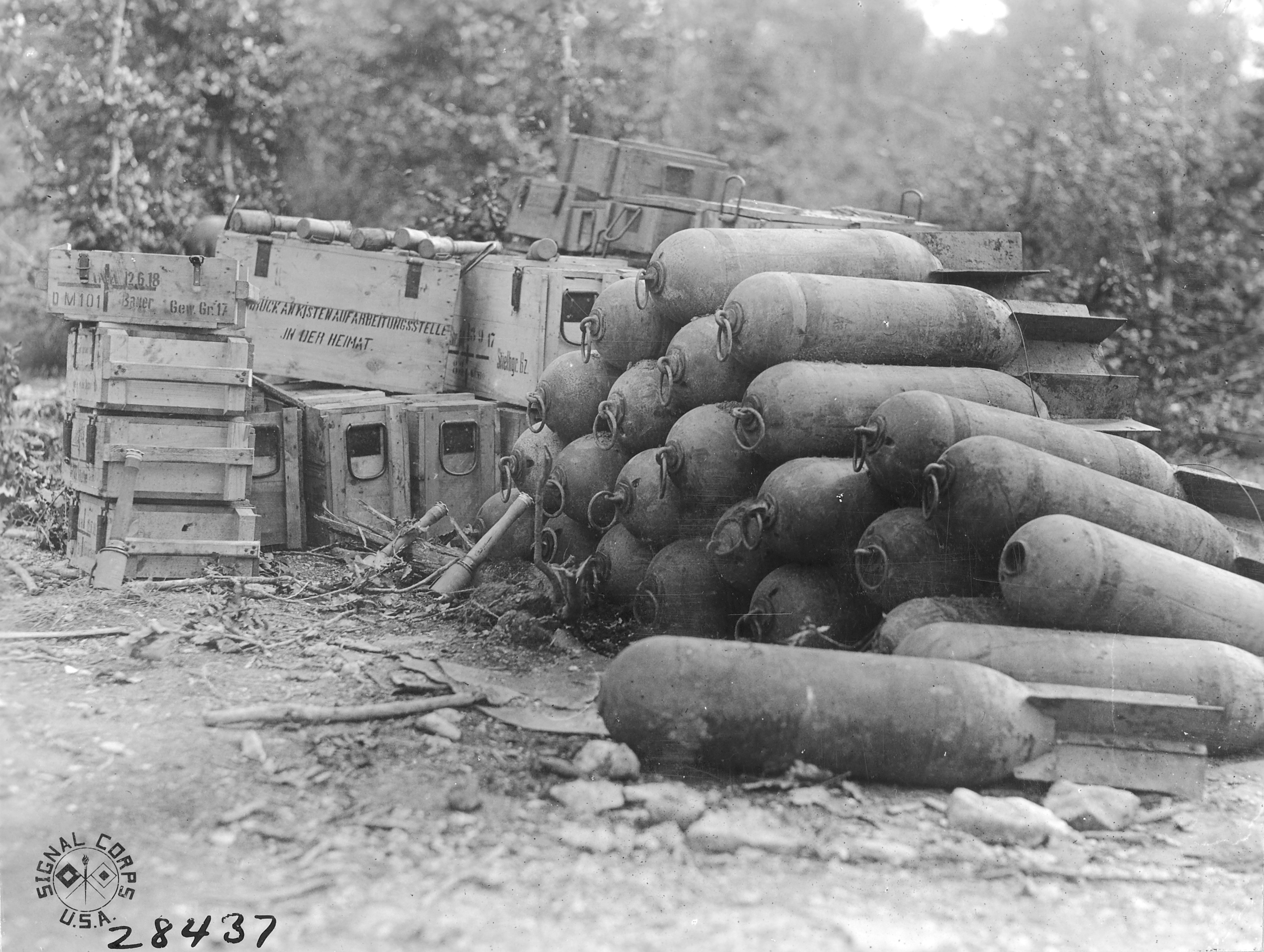
MinenWerfer bombs

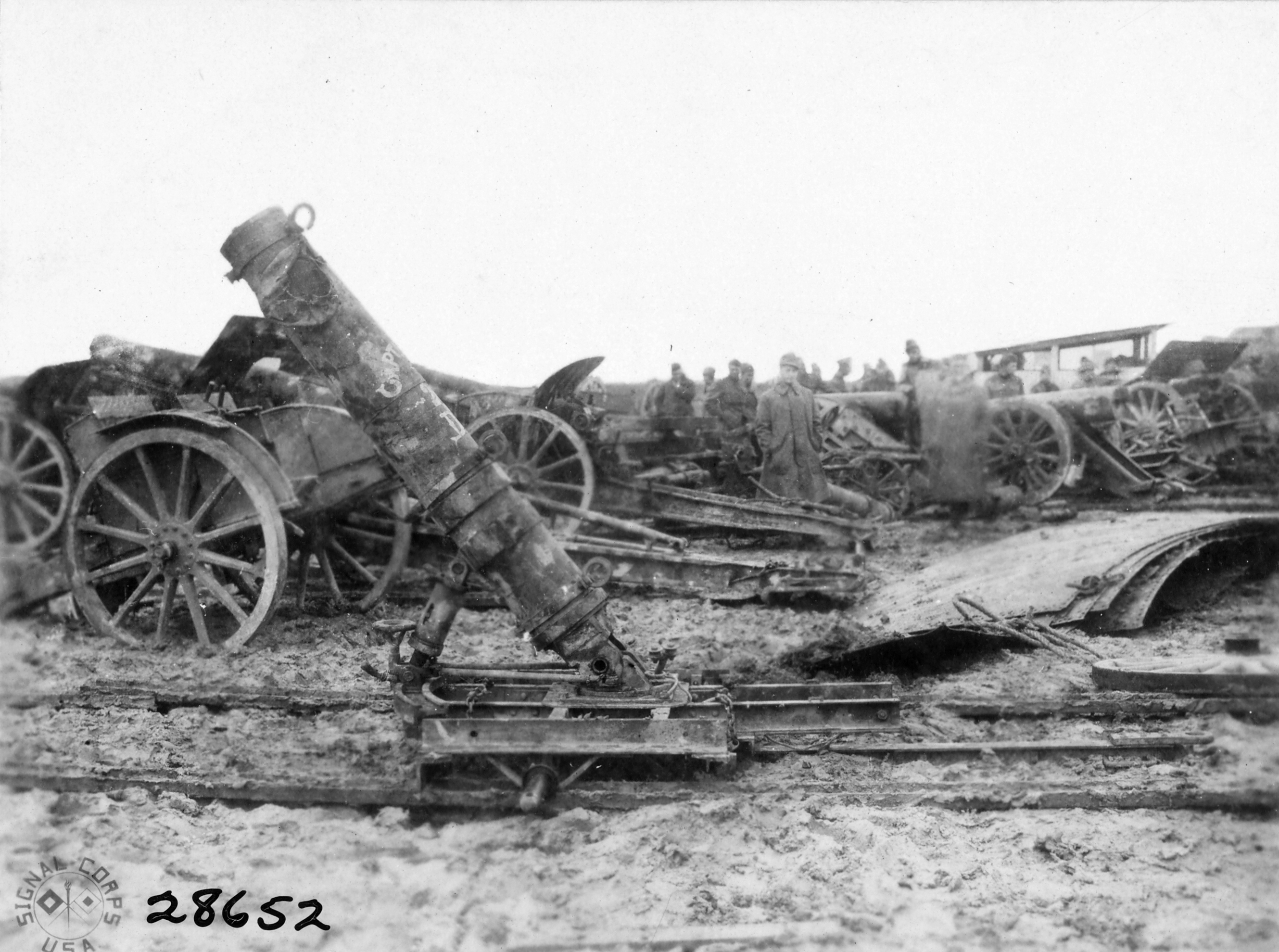
A photo of the earlier IKO mortar captured by US forces
