= 24 cm schwerer LadungsWerfer Ehrhardt =

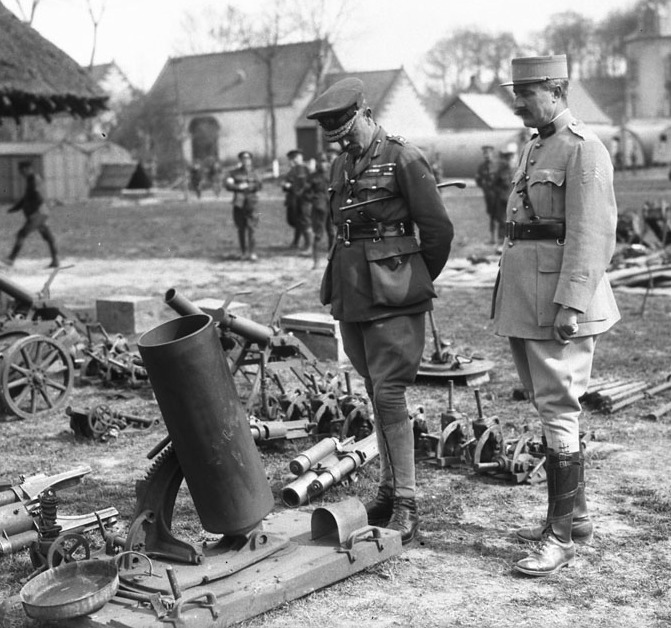
- Lt.-Gen. Sir Julian Byng inspects a 24 cm schwerer LadungsWerfer captured during the Battle of Vimy Ridge
- Type: Heavy mortar
- Place of origin: German Empire

Service history
- In service: 1916–1918
- Used by: German Empire
- Wars: World War I

Production history
- Designer: Rheinmetall
- Designed: 1915
- Manufacturer: Rheinmetall

Specifications
- Barrel length: 75 cm (2 ft 6 in)
- Shell: Separate loading charge and projectile
- Caliber: 24.5 cm (9.6 in)
- Breech: Muzzleloaded
- Recoil: None
- Maximum firing range: 20 kg: 265 m (290 yd); 30 kg: 190 m (210 yd); 40 kg: 160 m (170 yd)

The 24 cm schwerer LadungsWerfer Ehrhardt shortened to 24 cm sLW Ehrhardt, ('24 cm heavy charge thrower Ehrhardt' in English) was a heavy mortar used by the Imperial German Army during the First World War.

== History ==
Although the majority of combatants had heavy field artillery before the outbreak of the First World War, none had adequate numbers in service, nor had they foreseen the growing importance of heavy artillery once the Western Front stagnated and trench warfare set in.

Besides land mines, machine guns, and trenches, barbed wire was a persistent threat to attacking infantry. Often barbed wire was used to channel attackers away from vulnerable areas of the defenders' trenches, and funnel attackers into predefined kill zones where overlapping fields of machine-gun fire could be brought to bear. Rows of barbed wire could also be used to delay attackers allowing defenders time to man their trenches, and to hold attackers at a safe distance to allow defenders to call in defensive artillery fire.

What was needed to overcome the deadlock and give attackers an advantage was light, portable, simple, and inexpensive heavy firepower. A way to provide this was by designing a series of heavy trench mortars which could be brought to assault trenches to launch heavy, short-ranged preparatory bombardments to clear obstacles and neutralize enemy defenses.

== Design ==
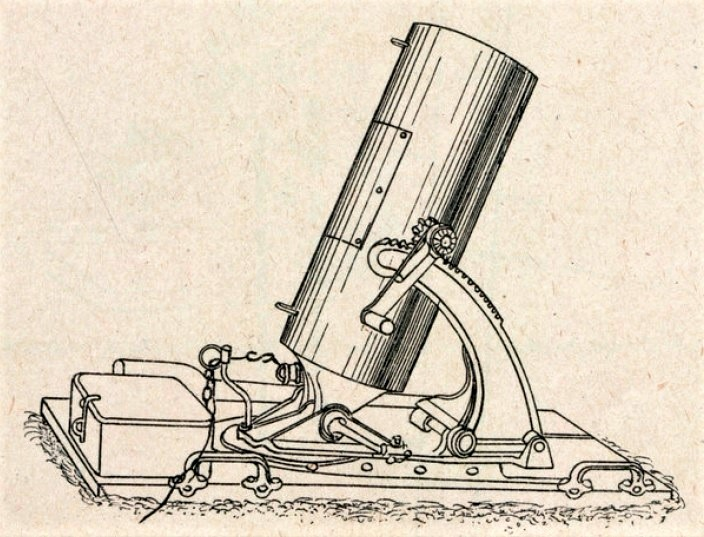
A line drawing of a LadungsWerfer.

The LadungsWerfer was designed and built by Rheinische Metallwaren und Maschinenfabrik based in Dusseldorf, Germany. The chief engineer of the company was Heinrich Ehrhardt who had directed the company since its creation in 1889. Early products of the Rheinmetall were often referred to as Ehrhardt products. Rheinmetall also produced 9 cm leichter LadungsWerfer and 18 cm mittlerer LadungsWerfers.

The LadungsWerfer consisted of a rectangular wooden base 1.15 m (3 ft 9 in) long by 59 cm (1 ft 11 in) wide with sheet metal reinforcement along its edges with four handles at the corners for carrying by its crew. There was a cast-iron swivel, attached to the base that was screwed into the base of the barrel and locked in place with a handle. At the front of the swivel, there was a crescent-shaped geared barrel support that attached to a crank on the side of the barrel to adjust elevation that also had a locking lever. Next to the elevation gear, there was a slot that held an inclinometer sight to aim the mortar. There was also a crescent-shaped rail along the front of the base that could be adjusted for the traverse. The large smoothbore barrel was 24.5 cm (9.6 in) in diameter but the German designation rounded down to the nearest centimeter. The advantage of the LadungsWerfer was that they were cheaper to build and easier to transport than the 25 cm schwerer Minenwerfer but they were shorter ranged.

== Ammunition ==
The LadungsWerfer could fire three different sized high-explosive projectiles. A 312 mm (1 ft) long projectile weighing 20 kg (40 lb), a 480 mm (1 ft 7 in) long projectile weighing 30 kg (70 lb), and 665 mm (2 ft 2 in) long projectile weighing 40 kg (90 lb). The projectiles consisted of thin-walled cast-iron ogive cases filled with explosives and sealed with a wooden base plug. There was no copper driving band or tail fins to stabilize the projectiles. At the nose of the projectile, there was a threaded metal plug that was removed before firing that a fuze screwed into. Due to poor velocity and trajectory, the projectiles sometimes fell on their side instead of their nose so a delay fuze was used instead of a contact fuze.

To fire a LadungsWerfer the traverse was set, then the elevation was set and both were locked in place by turning the handles of their locking levers. The range could be set by varying the elevation of the barrel, changing the size of the propellant charge, and there was a metal plaque with a range table attached to the barrel. A 30 g (1 oz), 60 g (2 oz), or 90 g (3 oz) black powder propellant charge was then slid down the barrel. A delay fuze was then screwed into the nose of the projectile, the safety ring was removed from the fuze, and the fuze was twisted to set the delay time 4-15 seconds. The projectile was then slid down the barrel. Lastly, a friction igniter was screwed into the base of the mortar and a lanyard was attached to the igniter. When a gunner pulled on the lanyard the igniter set off the propellant charge that also ignited a relay charge in the center of the projectile that started the delay fuze.

== World War One ==
The LadungsWerfers entered service during 1916 and were used until the end of the war. The German Army organized LadungsWerfers into specialized detachments known as Schwere LadungsWerfer Abteilung whose job was to clear enemy obstacles and wire entanglements before infantry assaults. LadungsWerfers were brought forward by a system of tunnels under the Butte de Vauquois to forward area firing posts during the fighting at Vauquois and caused heavy damage to French defenses. LadungsWerfers were also used during the fighting at Sainte Marie-aux-Mines. The French gave the projectiles the nickname "casque à pointe" ("pointed helmets") due to their similarity to the Pickelhaube worn by German soldiers. They were also known as "Rumkrug" in German ( rum jugs ).

== Weapons of comparable role, era or performance ==
- 22.5 cm Minenwerfer M 15 - Austrian equivalent
- 240 mm trench mortar - French equivalent
- 9.45-inch heavy mortar - British equivalent
