= 24 cm schwere Flügelminenwerfer IKO =

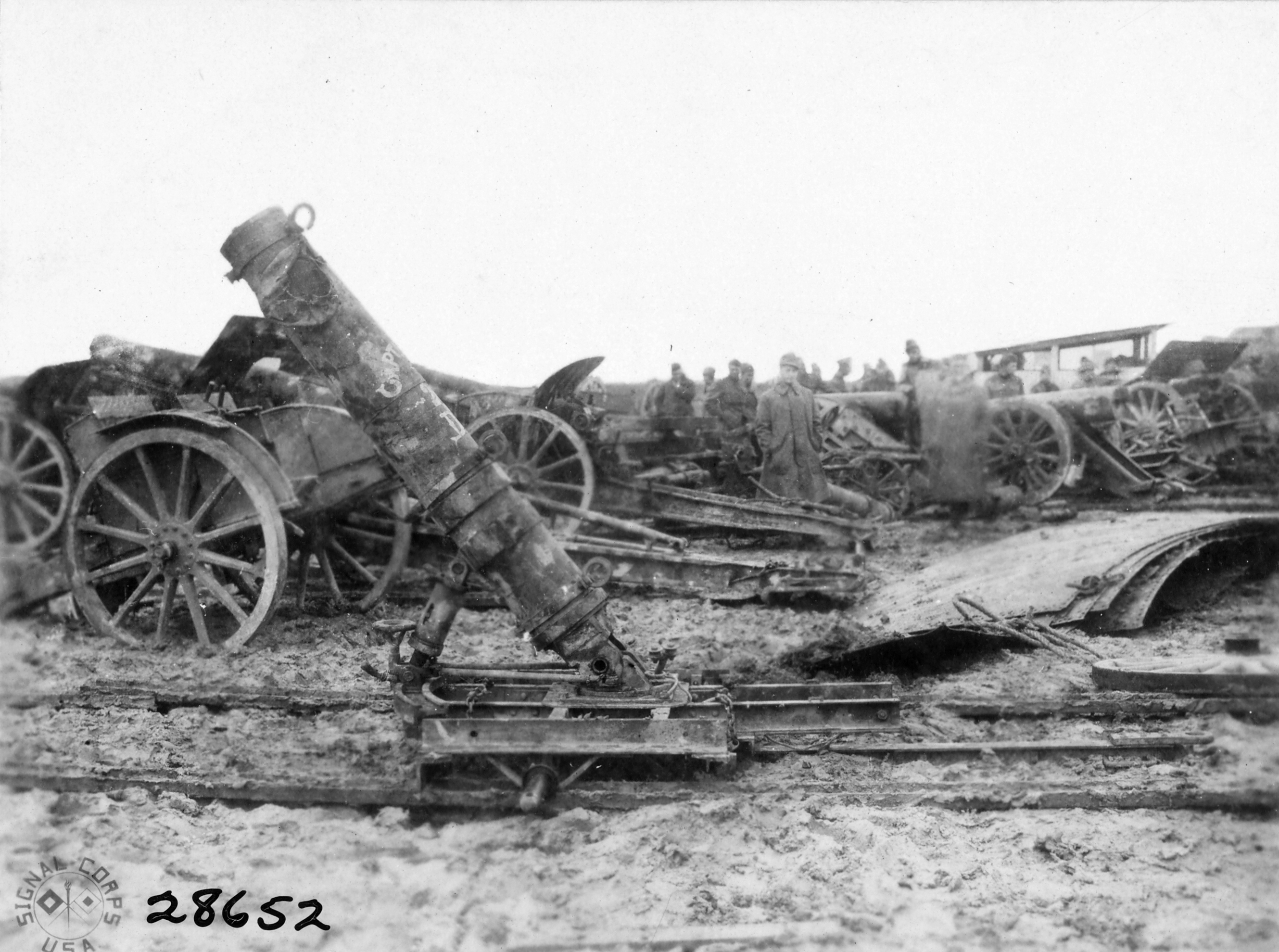
- An IKO mortar captured by US forces, France.
- Type: Heavy mortar
- Place of origin: German Empire

Service history
- In service: 1916–18
- Used by: German Empire
- Wars: World War I

Production history
- Designer: Ingenieur Komitee
- Manufacturer: Maschinenfabrik Germania, Oberschlesische Eisenbahn-Bedarfs-AG, Wolf Netter & Jacobi
- Produced: 1917

Specifications
- Mass: 590 kg (1,300 lb)
- Barrel length: 1.26 m (4 ft 2 in)
- Shell: Separate loading charge and 100 kg (220 lb) projectile
- Caliber: 24 cm (9.4 in)
- Recoil: None
- Carriage: Two wheeled
- Elevation: +50 to +75°
- Traverse: 60°
- Muzzle velocity: 150 m/s/ft/s (97,000 ft/s/m/min)
- Effective firing range: 1.5 km (0.93 mi)

The 24 cm schwere Flügelminenwerfer IKO (heavy mortar launcher) or 24 cm sFIMW IKO was a heavy mortar used by the Imperial German Army during the First World War.

== History ==
Although the majority of combatants had heavy field artillery before the outbreak of the First World War, none had adequate numbers in service, nor had they foreseen the growing importance of heavy artillery once the Western Front stagnated and trench warfare set in.

Besides land mines, machine guns, and trenches, barbed wire was a persistent threat to attacking infantry. Often barbed wire was used to channel attackers away from vulnerable areas of defenders trenches and funnel attackers into predefined kill zones where overlapping fields of machine-gun fire could be brought to bear. Rows of barbed wire could also be used to delay attackers allowing defenders time to man their trenches and to hold attackers at a safe distance to allow defenders to call in defensive artillery fire.

What was needed to overcome the deadlock and give attackers an advantage was light, portable, simple, and inexpensive heavy firepower. A way to provide this was by designing a series of heavy trench mortars which could be brought to forward area trenches to launch heavy, short-ranged preparatory bombardments to clear obstacles and neutralize dug-in enemy defenses.

== Design ==
Inspired by the success of the French Mortier de 240 mm introduced in 1915 the Imperial German Army's Ingenieur Komitee (Engineering Committee) or "IKO" submitted the design for a closely related heavy mortar. Great Britain, Italy, the United States, and the Austro-Hungarian Empire also produced their versions of the Mortier de 240 mm. The IKO mortar entered production in 1917 and was produced by a number of German companies such as Maschinenfabrik Germania, Oberschlesische Eisenbahn-Bedarfs-AG, and Wolf Netter & Jacobi. Another more complex mortar based on the IKO design was also produced by the Albrecht company and was designated 24 cm schwere Flügelminenwerfer Albrecht or 24 cm sFIMW 17 Albrecht. Approximately 700 of both types were produced.

Like the Mortier de 240 mm the IKO was a smooth bore mortar that used separate loading propellant charges and projectiles. The IKO consisted of a steel tube that screwed into a swivel at the base of the firing platform. The rectangular platform was built from angle iron and had an axle that could be connected to two wooden-spoked steel-rimmed wheels for towing. There was a crescent-shaped rail with a jackscrew at the front of the platform that controlled traverse and elevation. The firing platform was then placed on thick wooden timbers to absorb the recoil.

The IKO mortar was loaded by sliding a propellant charge down the muzzle of the mortar and then a percussion cap was screwed into the base. A four-finned mortar bomb was then slid down the tube and the mortar was fired by a lanyard that ignited the percussion cap and propellant. Both the IKO and Albrecht mortar used the same ammunition.

== See also ==
- 24 cm Minenwerfer M.16 - Austrian equivalent
- 240 mm Trench Mortar - French equivalent
- 9.45-inch Heavy Mortar - British equivalent

== Gallery ==
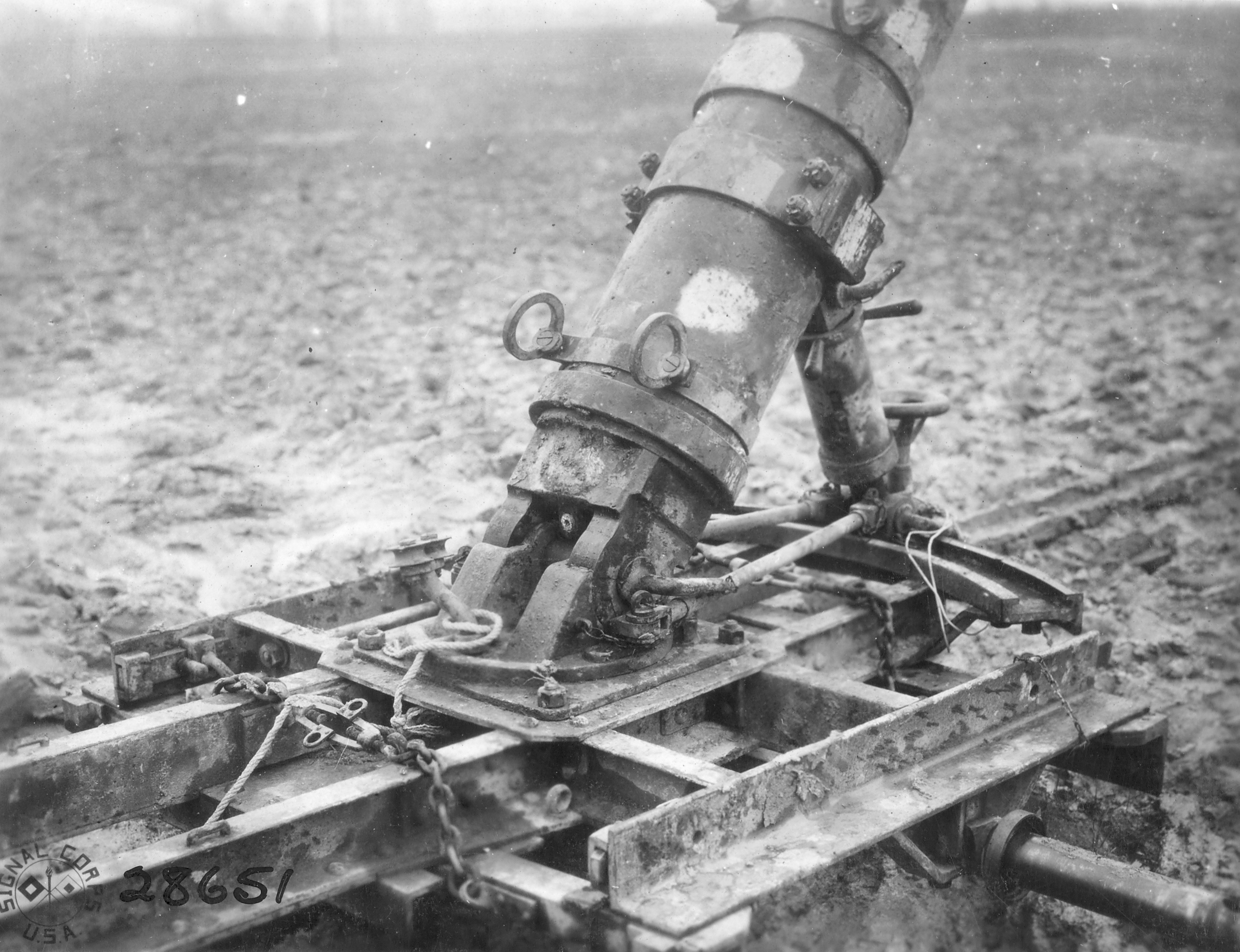
The breech and carriage of the IKO mortar

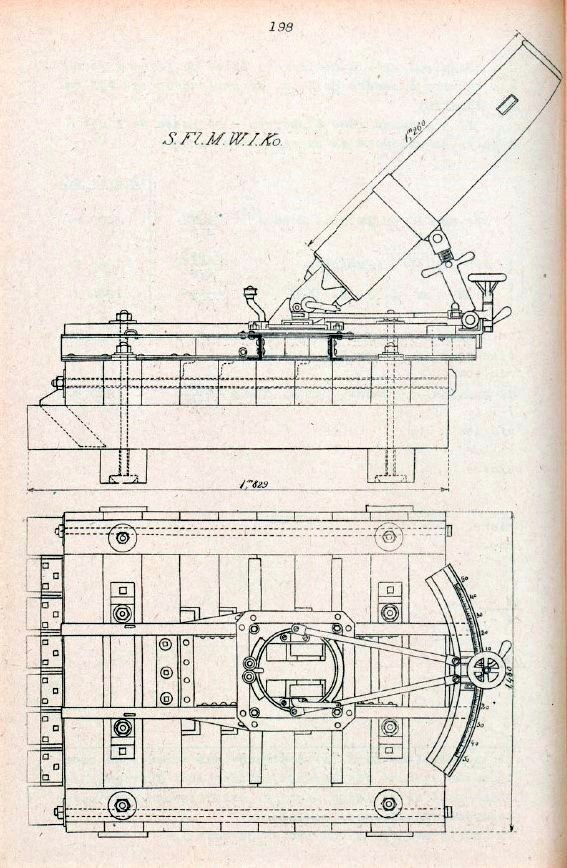
A drawing of the IKO mortar and its timber firing platform

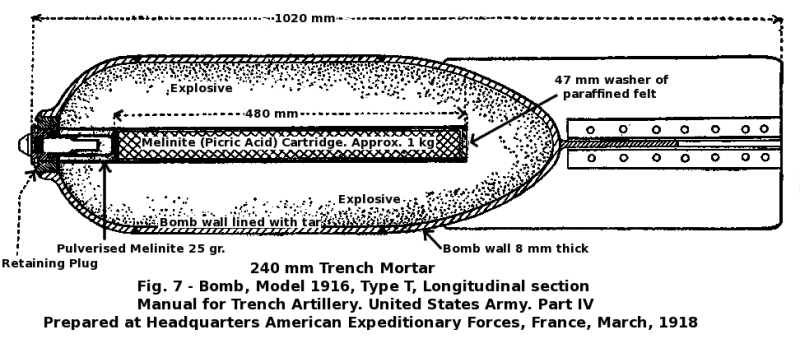
A drawing of an American 240 mm mortar bomb. The projectile for the IKO was very similar

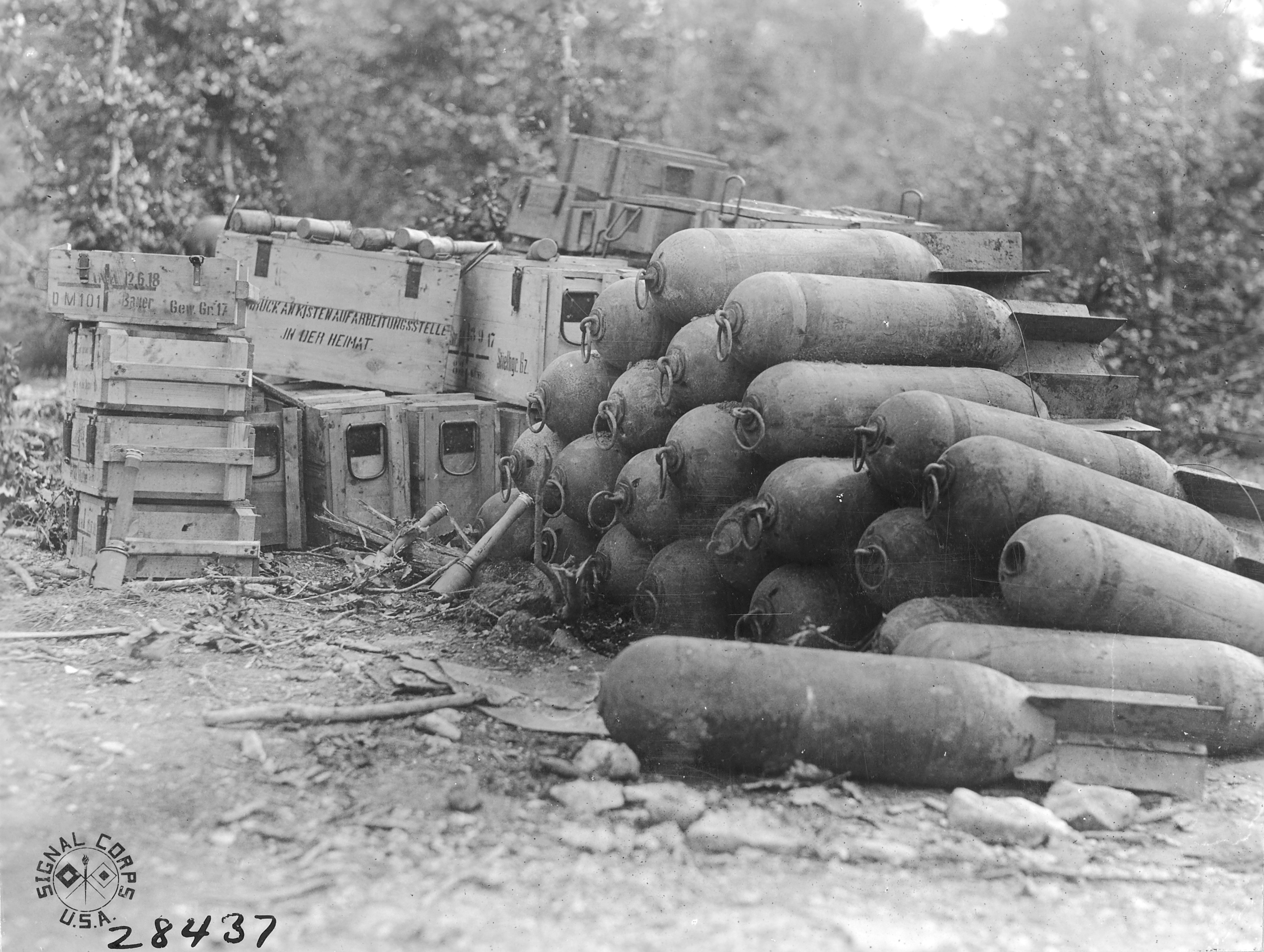
MinenWerfer bombs
