= 9.45-inch heavy mortar =

ML 9.45 inch heavy trench mortar
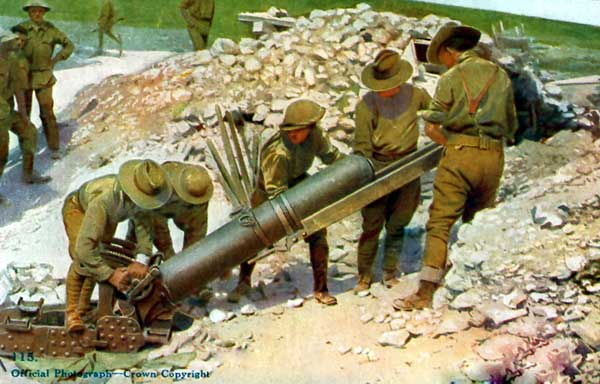
- Colourised postcard showing Australian Army personnel loading a mortar near Pozières – in August 1916, according to the caption. The absence of a fuse and lack of concealment indicates this is a training or publicity photograph away from the front line.
- Type: Heavy trench mortar
- Place of origin: United Kingdom

Service history
- In service: 1916–1918
- Used by: United Kingdom; Australia
- Wars: World War I

Production history
- Designer: Dumezil-Batignolles
- Designed: 1915
- No. built: 712

Specifications
- Mass: Mortar & elevating gear, + body & bed; Mk I: 499 lb (226 kg), + 987 lb (448 kg); Mk II–IV: 644 lb (292 kg), + 1,169 lb (530 kg)
- Barrel length: 4 ft 3 in (1.30 m) (Mk I); 5 ft 8 in (1.73 m) (Mk II–IV)
- Crew: 7
- Shell: HE 152 pounds (69 kg)
- Calibre: 9.45 inch (240 mm)
- Elevation: 75°–45°
- Traverse: 18° L & R
- Rate of fire: 1 round every 6 minutes
- Muzzle velocity: 475 ft/s (145 m/s) max charge
- Effective firing range: 660–2,400 yards (600–2,190 m)
- Filling: Amatol or ammonal

The ML 9.45 inch heavy trench mortar, nicknamed the "Flying Pig", was a large calibre mortar of World War I and the standard British heavy mortar from the autumn of 1916. It was a modification of an original French design, the Mortier de 240 mm developed by Batignolles Company of Paris and introduced in 1915. Britain manufactured the modified version under licence.

== History ==
The British ML 9.45-inch (240 mm) mortar was a design based on the 240 mm mortar in 1915 and introduced in 1916. The British version differed from the French LT weapon in that the propellant charge was loaded through the muzzle whereas the French 240 mm had the charge loaded through the breech in a brass cartridge case.

In June 1916, following unsatisfactory trials with the French model, Britain replaced them with 30 of its own model, firing a 150-pound bomb, followed by 200 more in December 1916.

The Mark I with 51-inch (1,300 mm) barrel was introduced from June 1916. In 1917, the Mark II and Mark III followed with 69-inch (1,800 mm) barrel, and small numbers of Mark IVs.

== Combat use ==
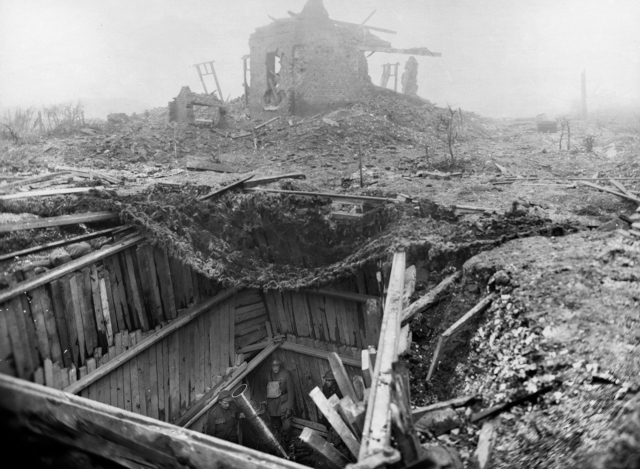
In a concealed cellar near Lens, 30 January 1918 Major Alex Sanderson DSO MC bar CO of 3rd Australian Tunnelling Coy (Centre) in a heavy mortar emplacement constructed by No.2 Section of 3 ATC close to Counter Trench at Cite St Pierre.On either side of Sanderson are two British 11th Division soldiers.Timber was salvaged from German dumps. (AWM E04600)

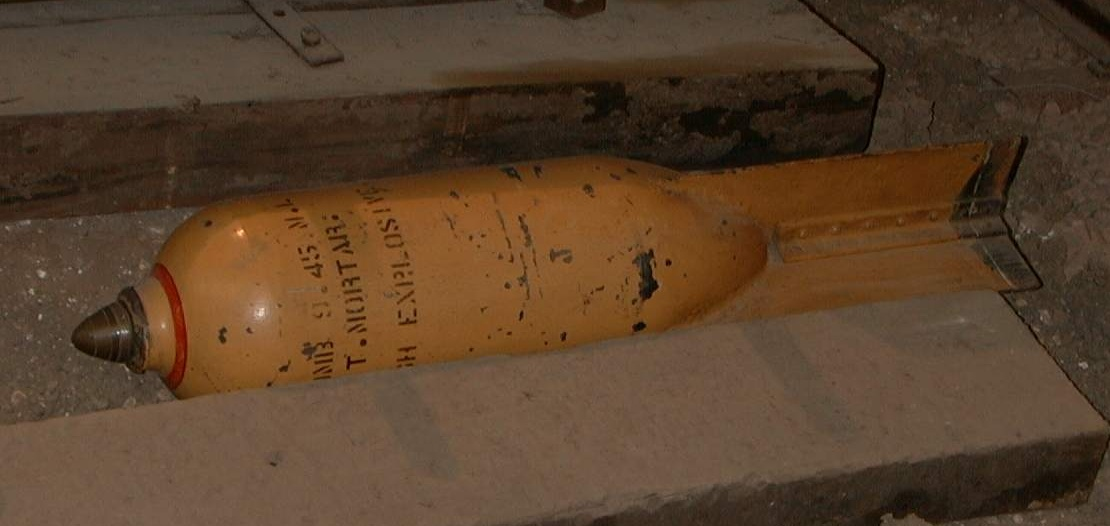
Bomb at Imperial War Museum Duxford

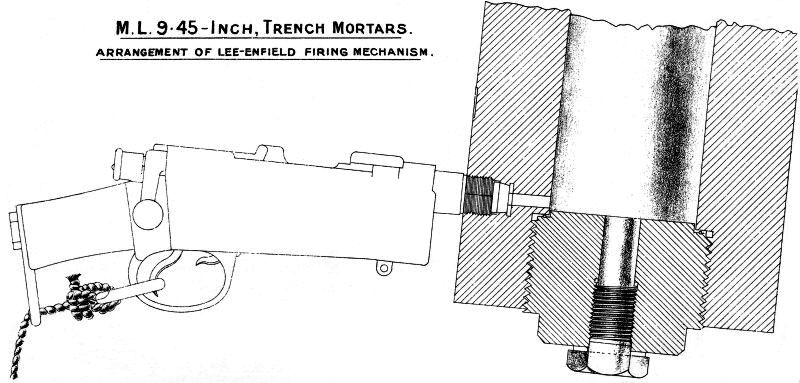
Lee–Enfield firing mechanism

The mortar was operated by crews of the Royal Garrison Artillery which was the part of the British Army that operated the heaviest artillery weapons, formed into batteries of four mortars attached to each division, designated "V/nn" where nn was the division number. From February 1918 they were reorganised and moved from divisional to corps control.

The weapon was dismantled for transport, requiring four carts for the barrel, base, carriage and ammunition.

In action, a heavy timber platform was constructed embedded in the ground, on which the mortar base was immovably secured. The mortar carriage sat on the base and could traverse. The mortar barrel and breech were mounted on the carriage which provided elevation.

They were used in the "siege warfare" on the Western Front to destroy enemy strongpoints, bunkers and similar "hard" targets which were invulnerable to lighter mortars and field guns. The US Army handbook described it : "... the use for which it is primarily adapted is in the bombardment of strongly protected targets - dwellings, covered shelters, command posts, entrances to galleries, etc - or in the destruction of sectors of trenches, salients and the like.". Their effectiveness decreased late in the war as German policy changed to a lightly held front line, hence decreasing available targets, and they became redundant when the war of movement resumed late in 1918.

Both the propellant charge appropriate for the required range and the bomb were loaded via the muzzle. Usually a Lee–Enfield rifle's bolt action mechanism was screwed into the breech. A special blank rifle cartridge was loaded and was triggered by pulling a lanyard, and fired into an igniter at the base of the mortar chamber, igniting the propellant charge and launching the bomb.

== Surviving examples ==
- British 9.45 mortar at Imperial War Museum Duxford

== See also ==
- List of heavy mortars

=== Comparable weapons ===
- 240 mm Trench Mortar - French, US & Italian version
- 24 cm schwere Flügelminenwerfer IKO - Near copy of the Mortier 240 mm.
- 25 cm schwere Minenwerfer - Approximate German equivalent

== Notes and references ==
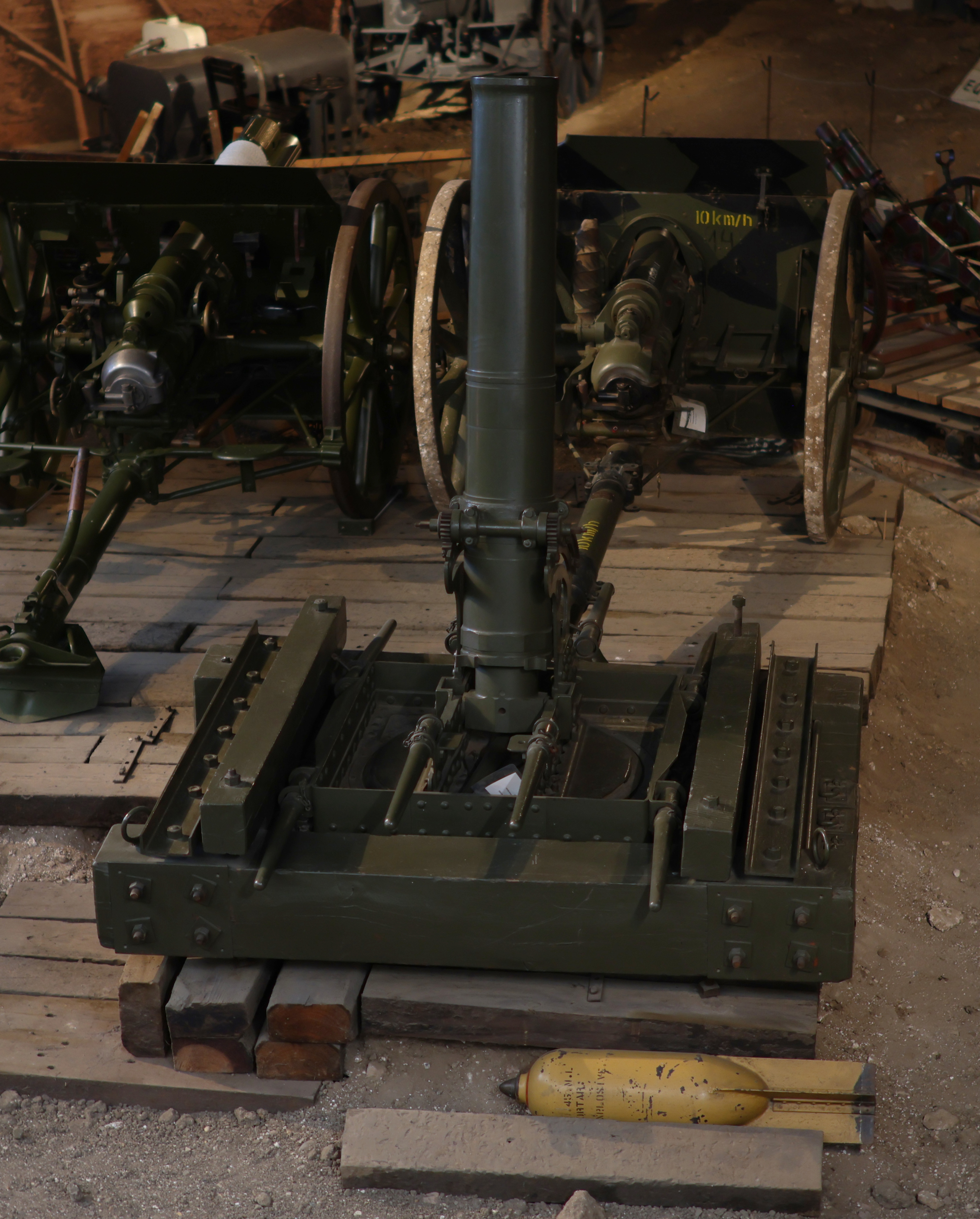
9.45-inch heavy mortar at Imperial War Museum Duxford

== Bibliography ==
- General Sir Martin Farndale, History of the Royal Regiment of Artillery. Western Front 1914-18. London: Royal Artillery Institution, 1986. ISBN 1-870114-00-0
- Handbook of the M.L. 9.45-In. Trench Mortars. Mks I, II and III. February 1918. War Office, UK. (Covers models in British service)
- "History of the Ministry of Munitions", 1922. Volume XI, Part I Trench Warfare Supplies. Facsimile reprint by Imperial War Museum and Naval & Military Press, 2008 ISBN 1-84734-885-8
