= 240 mm trench mortar =

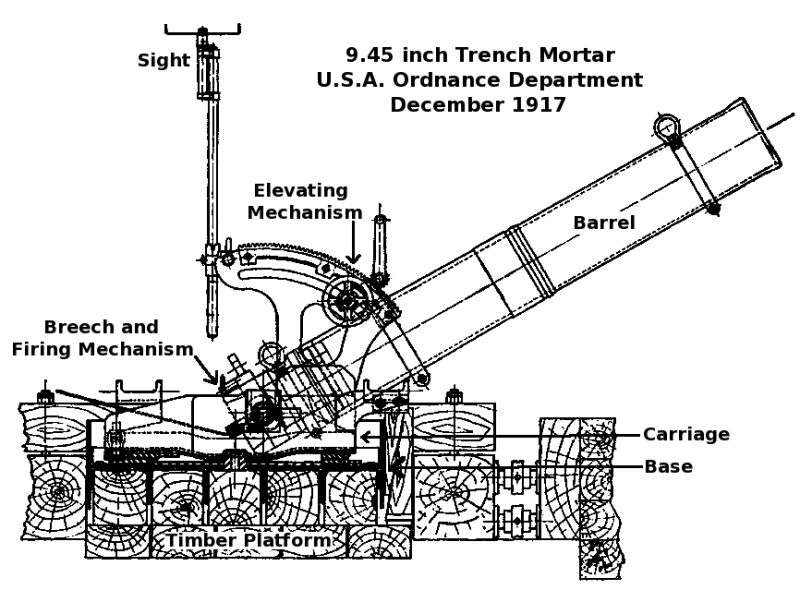
- 240 mm trench mortar, side view
- Type: Heavy trench mortar
- Place of origin: France

Service history
- In service: 1915–1918
- Used by: See operators
- Wars: World War I

Production history
- Designer: Dumezil-Batignolles
- Designed: 1915

Specifications
- Mass: Total: 866 kg (1,909 lb); Base: 344 kg (758 lb); Barrel & breech: 317.5 kg (700 lb); Carriage: 204 kg (450 lb)
- Barrel length: 2 metres (6 ft 7 in) (including breech)
- Crew: 7
- Shell: HE
- Shell weight: 81.6 kg (180 lb) (US & France)
- Caliber: 240 mm (9.4 in)
- Breech: Vertical sliding block
- Elevation: 45° / 75°
- Traverse: 18° left / 18° right
- Rate of fire: 1 per 6 min
- Muzzle velocity: 145 m/s (475 ft/s) (max charge)
- Effective firing range: 603 - 2,071 m (660 – 2,265 yd)
- Filling: Amatol or ammonal
- Filling weight: 40 kg (88 lb)

The 240 mm trench mortar, or Mortier de 240 mm, was a large calibre mortar of World War I. An original French design, it was developed by Batignolles Company of Paris and introduced in 1915.

== Service ==
The weapon was dismantled for transport, requiring four carts for the barrel, base, carriage and ammunition.

In action, a heavy timber platform was constructed embedded in the ground, on which the mortar base was immovably secured. The mortar carriage sat on the base and could traverse. The mortar barrel and breech were mounted on the carriage which provided elevation.

They were used in the "siege warfare" on the Western Front to destroy enemy strongpoints, bunkers and similar "hard" targets which were invulnerable to lighter mortars and field guns. The US Army handbook described it : "... the use for which it is primarily adapted is in the bombardment of strongly protected targets—dwellings, covered shelters, command posts, entrances to galleries, etc—or in the destruction of sectors of trenches, salients and the like.". Its effectiveness decreased late in the war as German policy changed to a lightly held frontline, hence decreasing available targets, and they became redundant when the war of movement resumed in mid-1918.

=== French use ===
The mortar was introduced in 1915 as the Mortier de 240 mm CT (court de tranchee). It was a short barreled version which fired a 192 pounds (87 kg) bomb for 1,125 yards (1,029 m), using a propellant charge of 1 lb 9 oz (710 g).

Its first major use was in the Champagne offensive of September 25, 1915.

This was followed later by the Mortier de 240 mm LT (long de tranchée) which was a long barreled version with improved firing arrangement and breech-loaded charge which fired a 179 lb (81 kg) bomb 2,265 yards (2,071 m), using a propellant of 2 lb 13 oz (1.3 kg). This appears to be the bomb configuration adopted by US.

French estimates were 80 bombs needed to destroy a strong shelter with a roof of concrete or rails and concrete.

=== US use ===
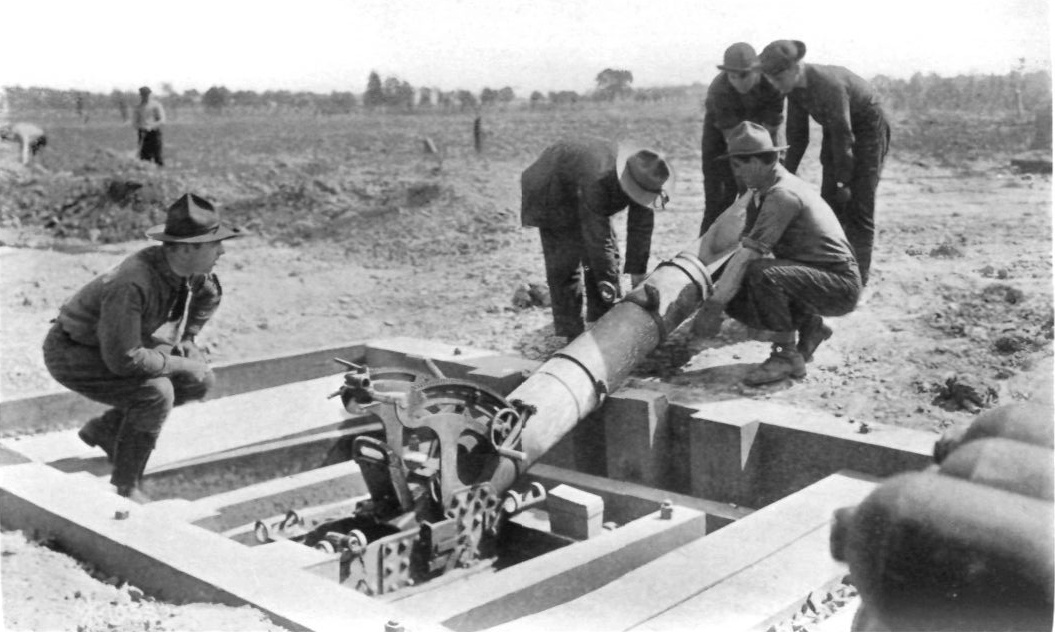
US gunners loading the mortar

David Lupton's Sons Co manufactured the weapon in the United States during World War I. They were used by nine trench mortar battalions of the Coast Artillery Corps.

The US version appears to have been a direct copy of the Mortier de 240 mm LT, i.e. with longer barrel and propellant charge loaded into the breech via a brass cartridge case. It was also produced late in the war but it is doubtful whether those were actually used in combat. The December 1917 manual describes the weapon as "9.45 inch" which is the French 240 mm converted into English units, that the US has adopted. The bomb is described as weighing 180 lb (82 kg), with an explosive charge of 90 lb (41 kg) and range from 660 to 2,500 yards (2,300 m).

The March 1918 manual describes the Bomb, Model 1916, Type T, weight 183 lb (83 kg), explosive 93 lb (42 kg), length 1.02 m (40 in). Barrel and breech weighing 690 lb (310 kg), carriage 448 lb (203 kg), base 764 lb (347 kg), timber platform 5,720 lb (2,590 kg). Propellant charges of 800 grams Ballistite + 15 grams F-3 black powder for 750–1,400 meters, and 1250 grams Ballistite + 15 grams F-3 for 1,100–2,200 meters. This figure agrees with the charge quoted for the mortar in French use for maximum range.

"Separate loading ammunition" was used i.e. the mortar bomb was a separate unit from the propellant cartridge case, which was flanged, brass, 9.776 inches long x 6.67 inches (169 mm) diameter (248.3 by 169.4 mm). The bomb was loaded into the barrel muzzle. The cartridge containing propellant charge appropriate for the required range was loaded into the breech, similar to a howitzer.

The mortar was fired by pulling a lanyard, which activated a primer located in the base of the cartridge case, igniting the propellant charge inside. After firing, the cartridge cases could be reused following cleaning and replacement of the primer.

=== Italian Use ===
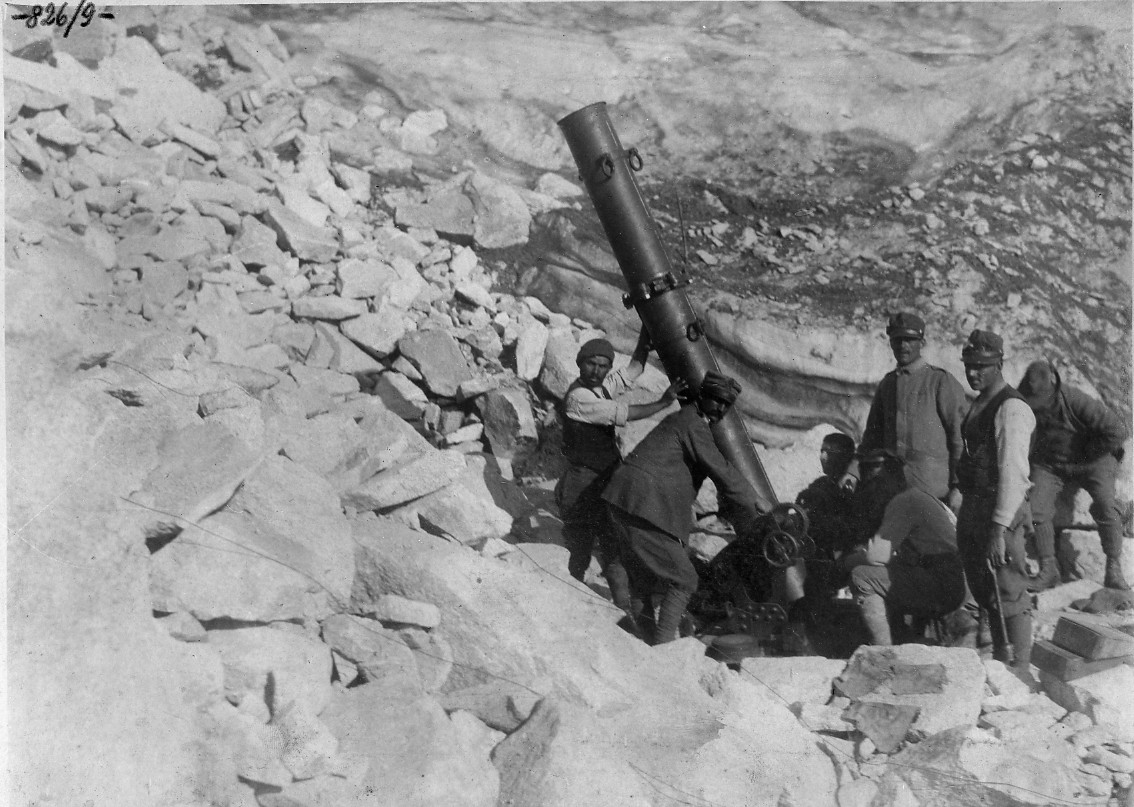
Italian model with long barrel, on the Adamello glacier

Italy adopted and manufactured both the French CT (Bombarda da 240 C) and LT (Bombarda da 240 L) mortars. Mortar groups were established with 240 C, 240 L, and 58A (Mortier de 58 mm type 2) batteries, which were split in December 1916 into batteries of 58A and 240mm mortars. The 240mm battery consisted of 4 sections with 2 mortars each, and a combined staff of 7 officers, 215 men, 62 horses, a baggage wagon, and 4 bicycles. By the end of 1916, 510 240mm mortars were still in service. After World War I ended some of the 240mm mortars were exported to Montenegro.

=== Austro-Hungarian 24 cm Minenwerfer M.16 ===
Some 400 were copied and manufactured by Böhler during World War I based on examples captured from Italy, although the Austrians had problems recreating the original powder mixture and their shells suffered from large dispersion.

=== German 24 cm s.Flügelminenwerfer ===
The US A.E.F. in France reported in March 1918 : "... a new pattern minenwerfer which was brought out in 1916 and looks very much like the French 240... uses a heavy bomb fitted with four vanes like the French 240 mm bombs. This bomb weighs 100 kg (220 lb) and contains 42 kg (93 lb) of explosive... ranges obtained vary from 490 to 1,310 yards (450 to 1,200 m)". The specifications appear similar to the early French 240 mm CT. It is unknown whether this was related to the French or Austrian Böhler versions.

== Operators ==
- Austria-Hungary
- France
- Italy
- Russian Empire
- United States

== See also ==
- List of heavy mortars

=== Comparable weapons ===
- 25 cm schwere Minenwerfer German equivalent
- 9.45 inch Heavy Mortar British version

== Surviving examples ==
- A French LT example is displayed in the open at Place de Longueval, France
  Bernard Plumier : Link to his web page which has details and photograph Direct link to photograph
- The Central Museum of The Royal Regiment of Canadian Artillery, Shilo Manitoba German 24 cm minenwerfer
