= 122 mm gun M1931 (A-19) =

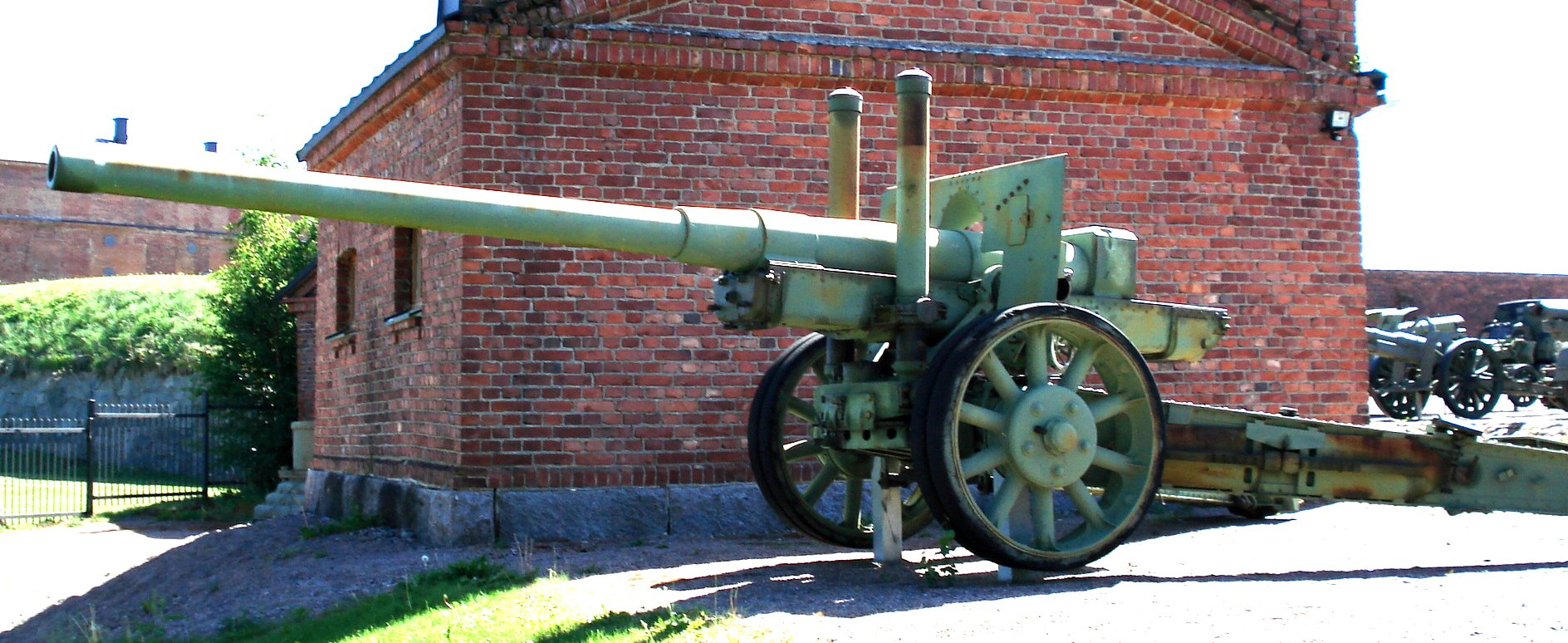
- M1931 displayed in Hämeenlinna Artillery Museum, Finland
- Type: field gun
- Place of origin: USSR

Production history
- Designed: 1927–1935
- Manufacturer: Barrikady
- Produced: 1935–1939
- No. built: about 450–500

Specifications
- Mass: Combat: 7,100 kg (15,700 lbs); Travel: 7,800 kg (17,000 lbs)
- Length: 8.9 m (29 ft)
- Barrel length: Bore: 5.48 m (20 ft) L/45; Overall: 5.65 m (18.5 ft) L/46.3
- Width: 2.345 m (8 ft)
- Height: 1.99 m (6.5 ft)
- Crew: 9
- Caliber: 121.92 mm (4.80 in)
- Breech: interrupted screw
- Recoil: hydro-pneumatic
- Carriage: split trail
- Elevation: −2° to 45°
- Traverse: 56°
- Rate of fire: 3–4 rounds per minute
- Maximum firing range: 20.4 km (12.7 mi)

122 mm corps gun M1931 (A-19) (Russian: 122-мм корпусная пушка обр. 1931 г. (А-19)) was a Soviet field gun, developed in the late 1920s and early 1930s. In 1939 the gun was replaced in production by an improved variant, M1931/37. The piece saw action in World War II with the Red Army. Captured guns were employed by Wehrmacht and the Finnish Army.

== Development history ==
From the late 1920s the Red Army sought to upgrade its First World War era artillery pieces. In January 1927 the Main Artillery Directorate (GRAU) initiated development of a new 122 mm gun for corps artillery. The development was initially entrusted to the GRAU design bureau (led by F. F. Lender until his death in September 1927), and from June 1929 – to the design bureau of the All-Union Ordnance Trust, with assistance from GRAU designers.

On 17 June 1929 a prototype, along with technological documentation, was ordered from Motovilikha Plants. It underwent trials starting in October 1931, with two barrels of different construction, both fitted with a muzzle brake. In May 1932 the gun was sent for improvements to the No 38 Plant, and it received that plant's designation A-19. In 1933, three more prototypes were ordered from the Barrikady Plant in Stalingrad and were completed in March 1935. The gun reached trials again in November 1935. After successfully completing the trials, it was adopted by the RKKA on 13 March 1936 as 122 mm corps gun M1931 (A-19).

== Production history ==
The M1931 was in production from 1935 to 1939. It was gradually improved until 1937, therefor, late production pieces differ from the early production ones. In 1939, the gun was replaced in production by an improved variant, M1931/37, which combined the barrel of the M1931 with the carriage of the 152 mm howitzer-gun M1937 (ML-20). The exact number of pieces manufactured is not known; estimations are 450–500 pieces.

Production of M1931.
Year	1935	1936	1937	1938	1939
Produced, pcs.	30	91	78	150	256 (including M1931/37)

== Description ==
In contrast with World War I-era guns, the M1931 had a split trail carriage, allowing for much wider traverse angle. The carriage was fitted with a leaf spring suspension and ten-spoke metal wheels with solid rubber tires. Some late production pieces had ML-20-type wheels with pneumatic tires. The carriage also featured spring-type equilibrator. The Gun shield gave the crew some protection from small arms and shell fragments.

The barrel consisted of liner, jacket and screwed-upon breech. Early production barrels had a built-up construction, but in 1936 these were replaced in production by loose liner barrels. The breechblock was of interrupted screw type, similar in construction to that of the 152 mm howitzer M1910/37. Unlike early prototypes, productional barrels did not have muzzle brake. Recoil system consisted of hydraulic recoil buffer and hydro-pneumatic recuperator, both located inside the cradle under the barrel.

The limber of the experimental 152 mm ML-15 was used.

Initially a separate transportation (with the barrel removed from the carriage and transported on a special wagon) was considered. However, following the trials it was decided to always tow the gun as a single piece. Several types of artillery tractors were employed: S-2 Stalinets-2, Komintern and, from 1943, Ya-12.

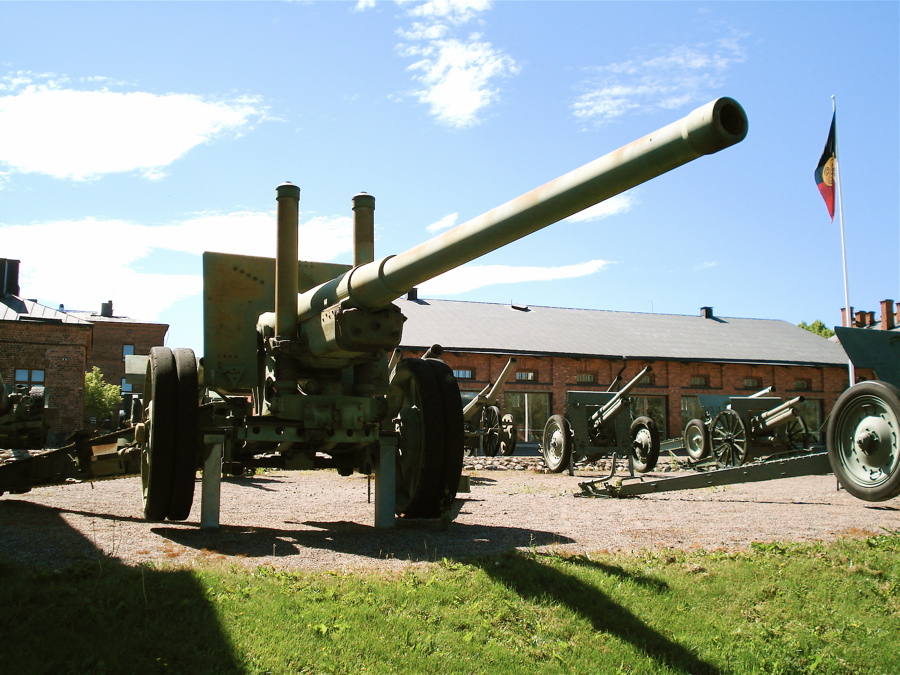

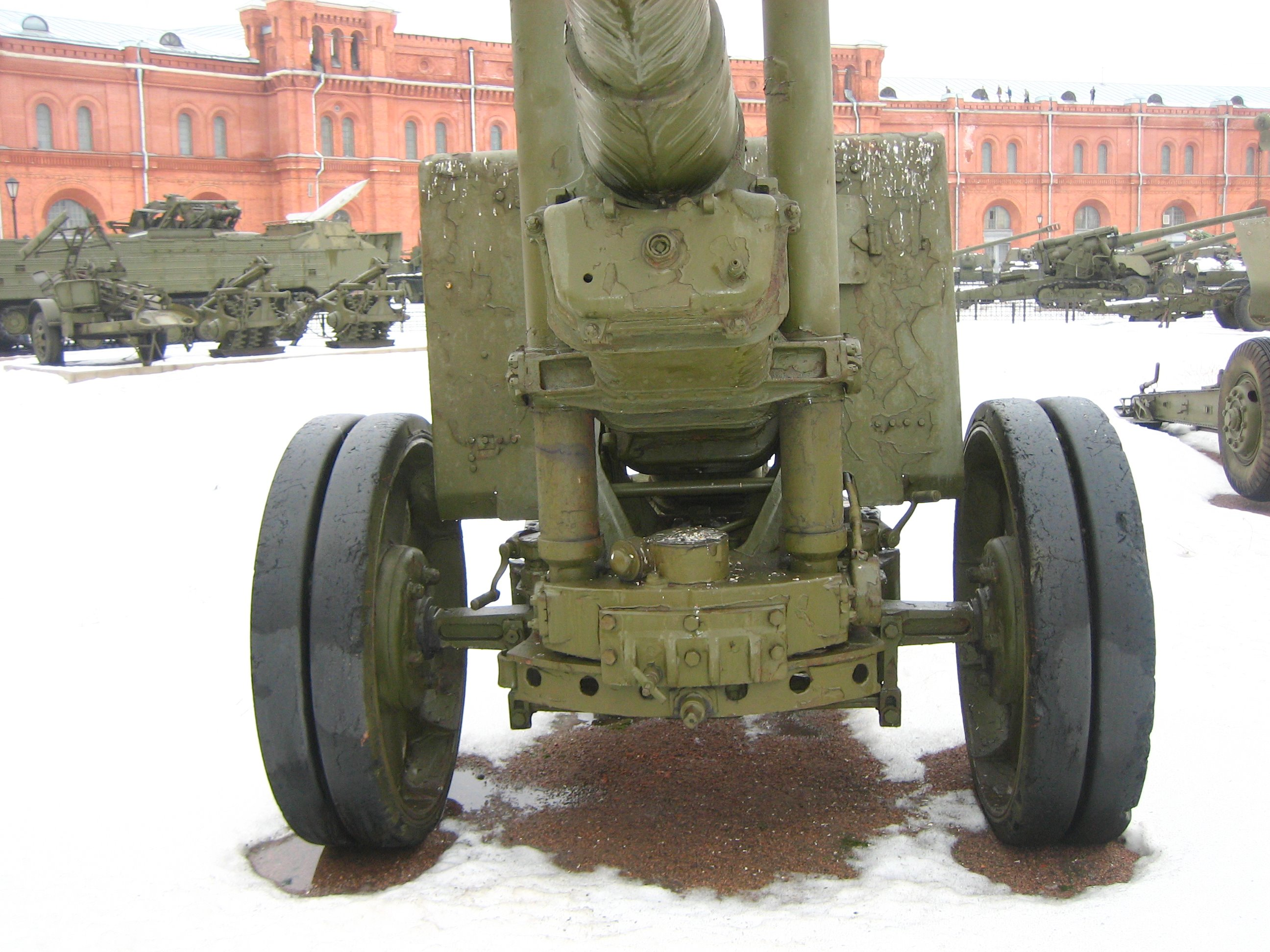

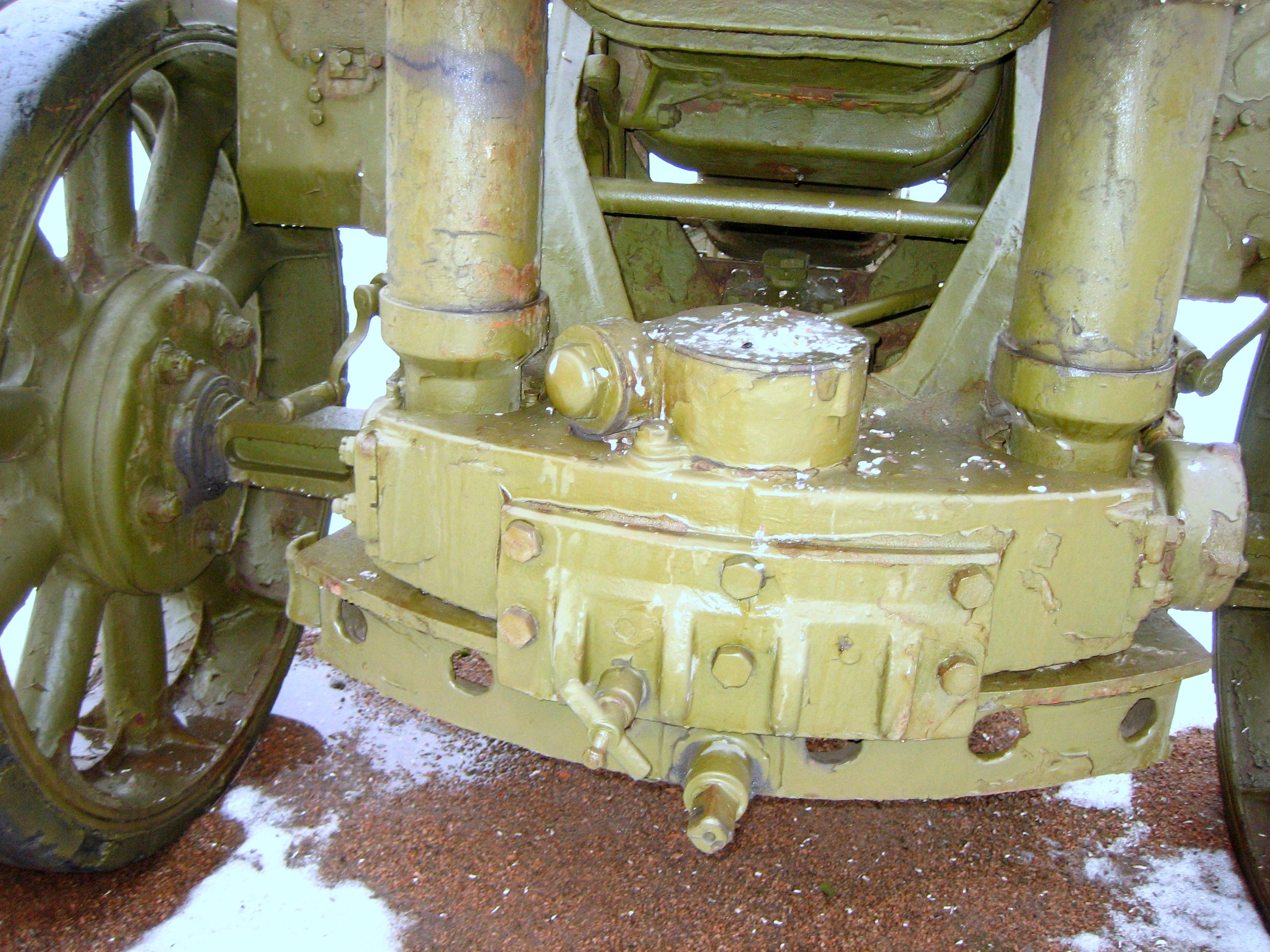

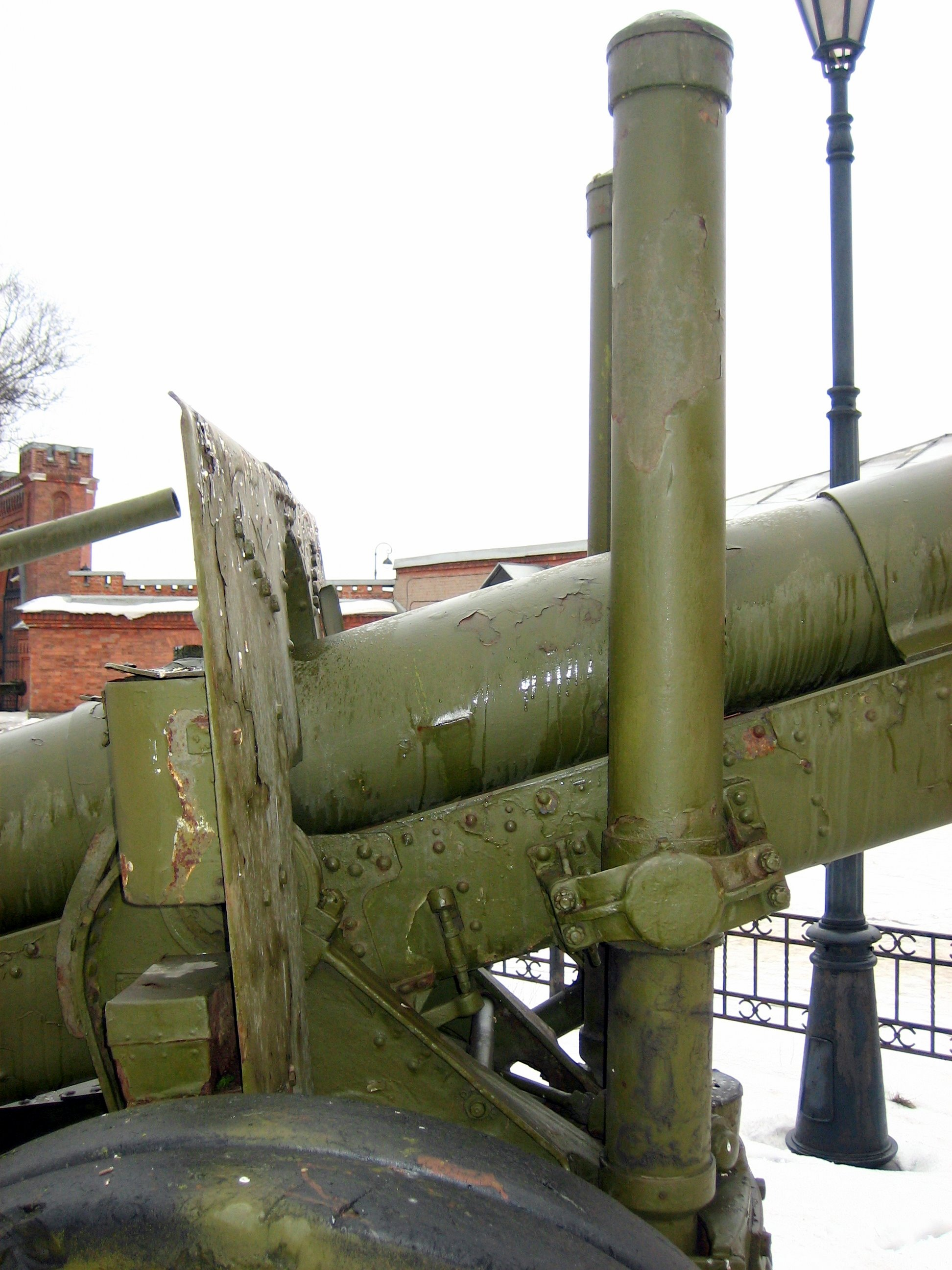

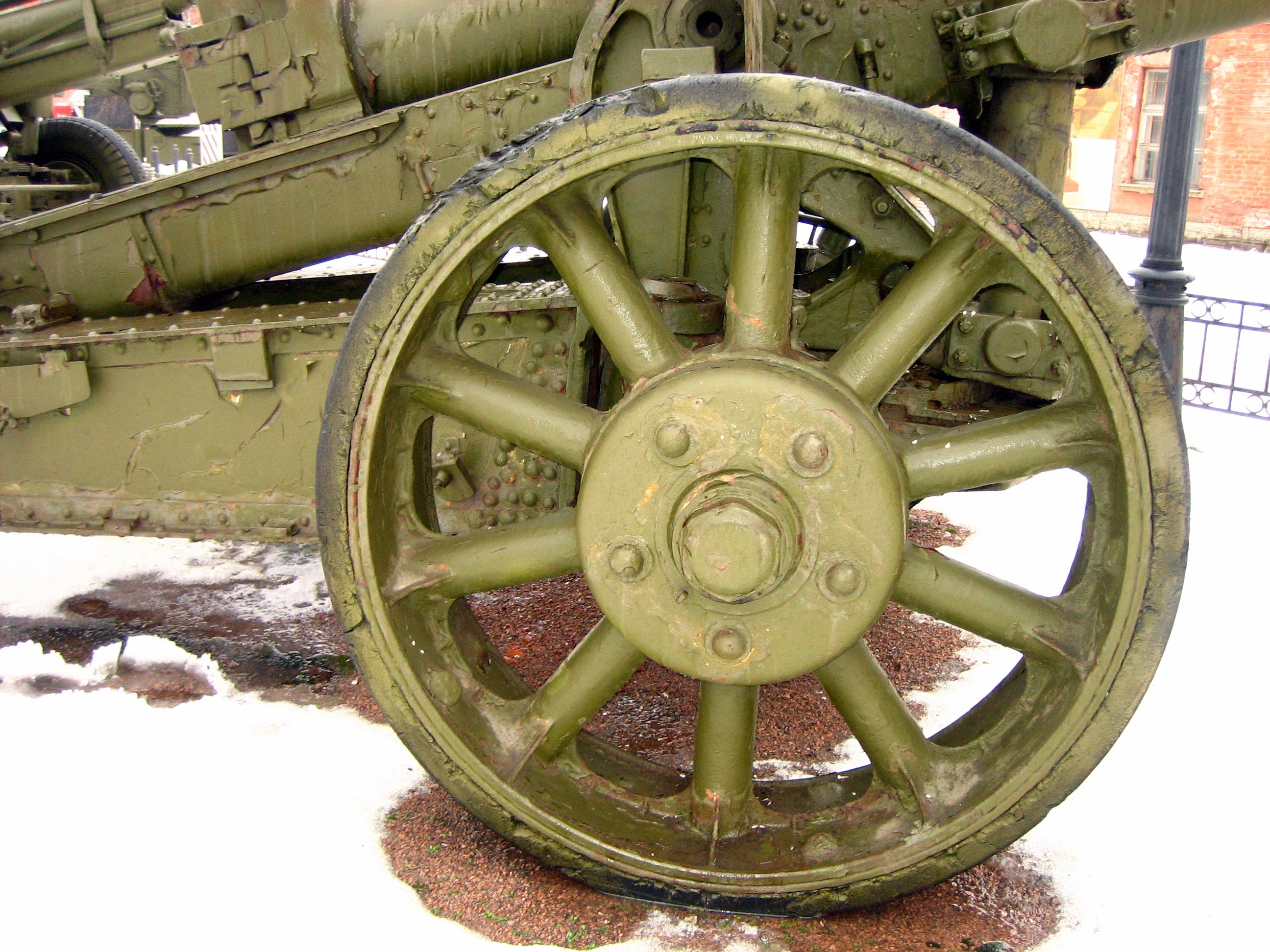

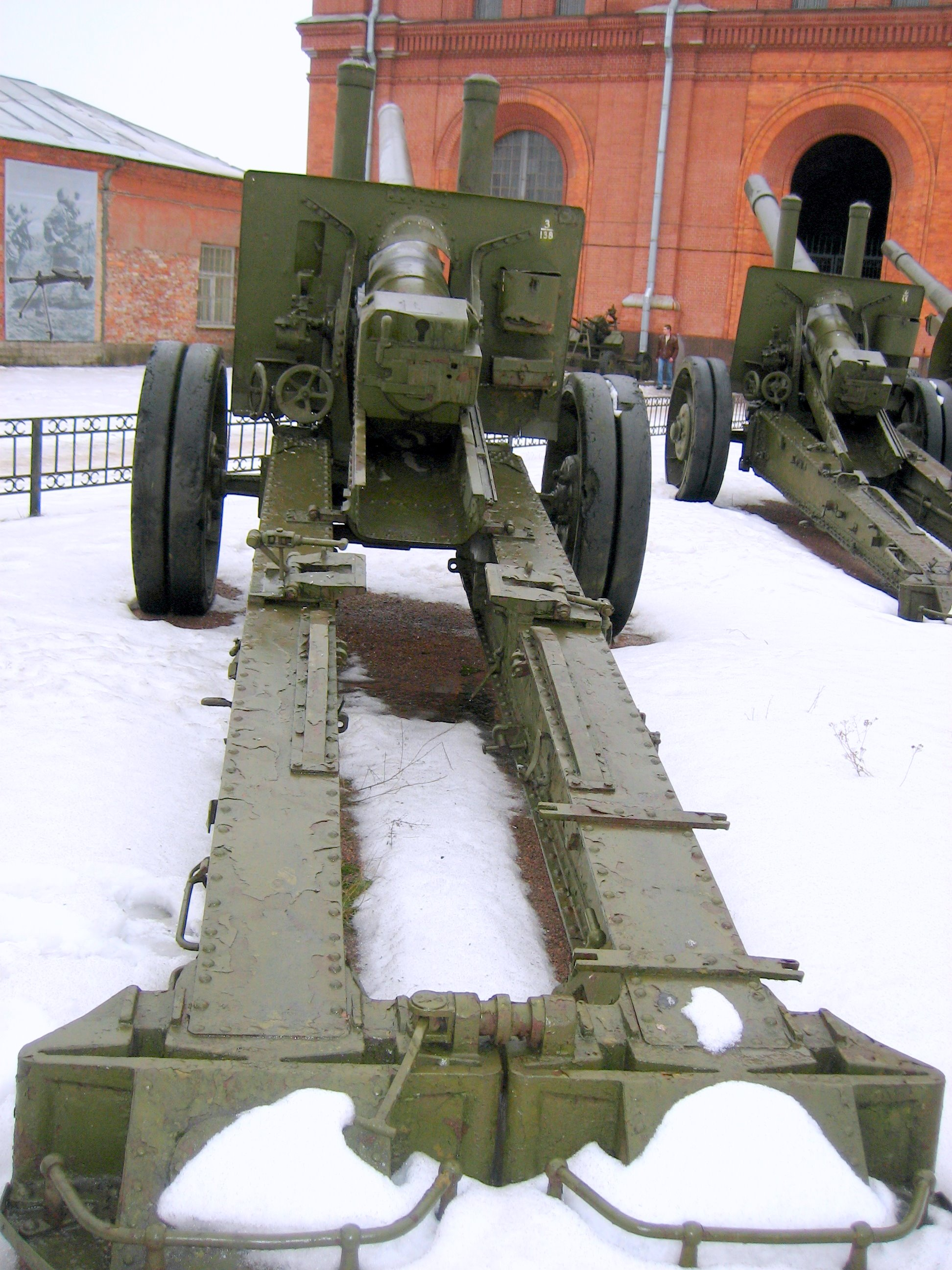

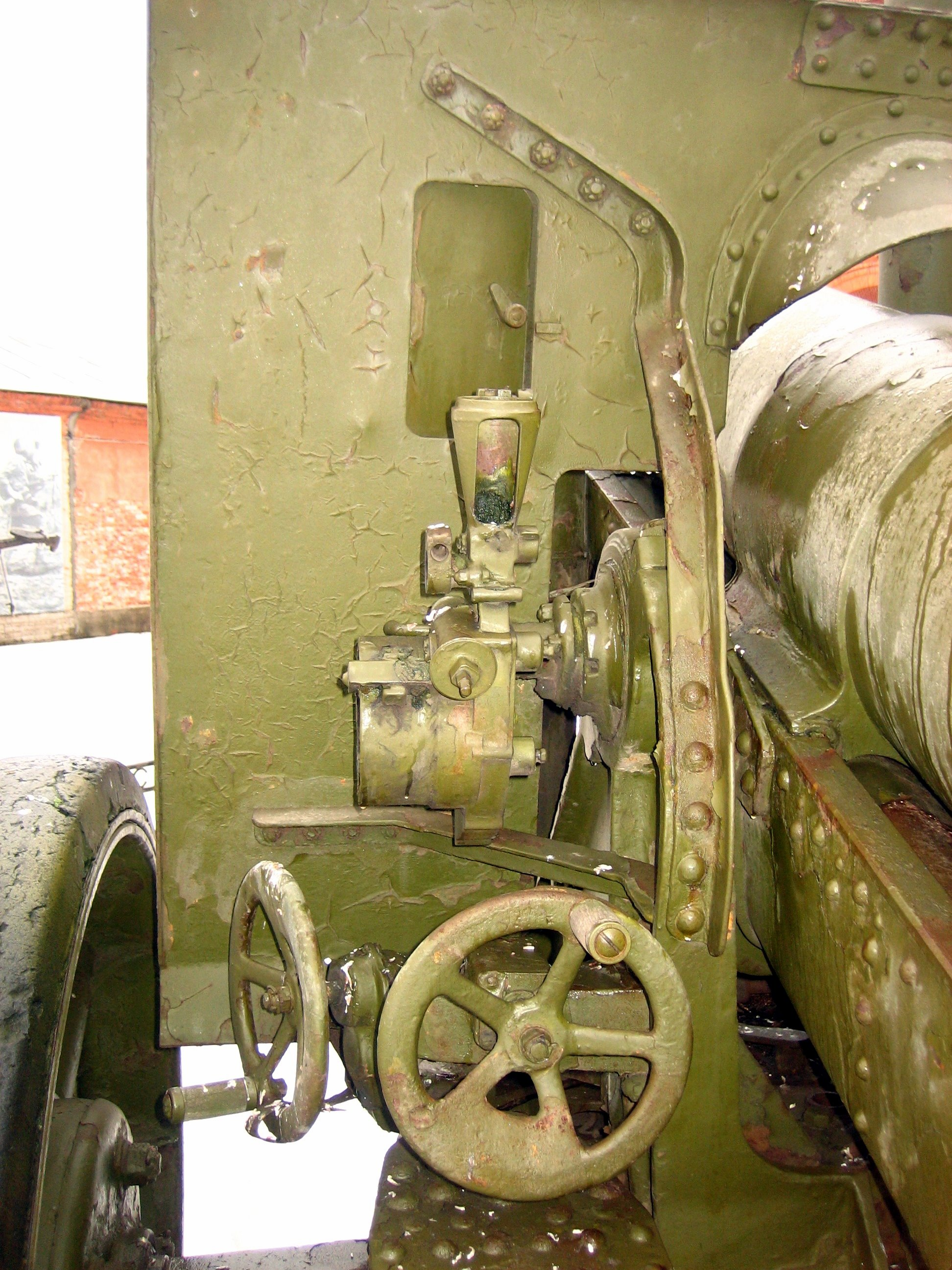

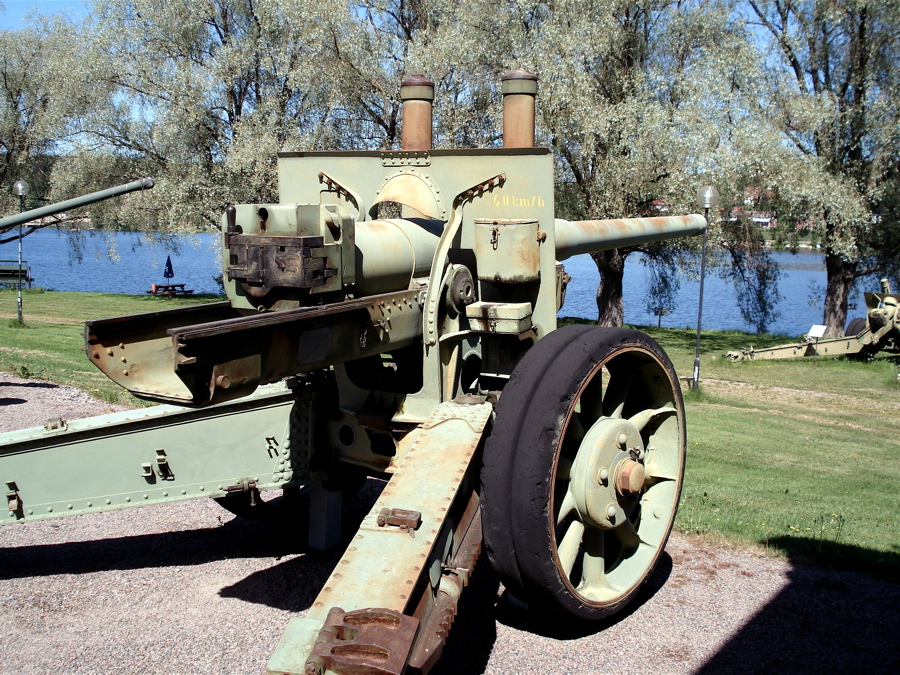

== Organization and employment ==
Both variants – M1931 and M1931/37 – had the same place in army organizations, were often used alongside each other and combat reports rarely differentiate between them; consequently, the data in this section is for M1931 and M1931/37 together, unless specified otherwise.

=== Red Army ===
The A-19 was originally intended for corps artillery. Together with ML-20 it formed a so-called "corps duplex". In 1940–41 there were three types of corps artillery regiments:

- With two battalions of ML-20 and one of either A-19 or 107-mm guns (a total of 24 ML-20s).
- With two battalions of ML-20 and two of either A-19 or 107-mm guns (a total of 24 ML-20s).
- With three battalions of ML-20 (a total of 36 ML-20s).

Soon after the outbreak of the Great Patriotic War the corps artillery was eliminated (as rifle corps themselves were eliminated) and was only reintroduced late in the war. Those new artillery regiments were issued 122 mm guns along with other pieces, mainly 107 mm guns and 152 mm howitzers, in total 16–20 pieces per regiment. On 1 June 1944, RKKA corps artillery possessed 387 A-19s (along with some 750 107 mm and 152 mm pieces), an on 1 May 1945 – 289 A-19s (again along with some 750 100 mm, 107 mm and 152 mm pieces).

The gun was also used by artillery units of the Reserve of the Main Command (RVGK). In mid-1941 a cannon regiment of the RVGK had 48 A-19; in autumn 1941 these regiments were reorganized, a new, smaller, regiment had 18 A-19s. From 1942 cannon brigades were introduced, with 36 A-19s each. Such brigade could be a part of an artillery division – a huge formation, with up to four brigades of A-19 or ML-20 (meaning up to 144 pieces).

The first combat use of the A-19 was in the Battle of Khalkhin Gol. It also saw combat in the Winter War. On 1 March 1940 there were 130 A-19 guns at the frontline. Three pieces were lost.

By June 1941 the RKKA possessed, according to different sources, 1257 (1236 in the Army and 21 in the Navy) or 1300 A-19s. The gun proceeded to be used throughout the Great Patriotic War.

The A-19 was primarily used for indirect fire against enemy personnel, fortifications and key objects in the near rear. It was also equipped with armour-piercing shells for direct fire against armoured targets. Although not an ideal anti-tank gun because of its large size, slow traverse and relatively slow rate of fire, in 1943 the A-19 was one of a few guns effective against new German tanks.

=== Other operators ===
In the early stage of the Great Patriotic War hundreds of A-19s fell into the hands of Wehrmacht. Both variants were adopted – M1931 as 12,2 cm K.390/1(r) and M1931/37 as 12,2 cm K.390/2(r). Germans used a total of 424 of these guns in field and coastal artillery and manufactured ammunition for them.

The Finnish Army captured 25 pieces in 1941 and also pressed them into service. The same designation 122 K/31 was applied to both variants. Because of shortage in heavy tractors, the gun was mostly used in coastal artillery. Four pieces were lost; the rest remained in service after the war. During the 1980s some pieces had their barrels replaced with 152 mm barrels of the ML-20; the resulting pieces were designated 152 H 37-31. In the late 1980s all 152 H 37-31 and the remaining 122 K/31 received new 152 mm L/32 barrels manufactured by Vammas, to become 152 H 88-31. Only in 2007 did the Finnish Army begin to remove these guns from service.

== Variants ==
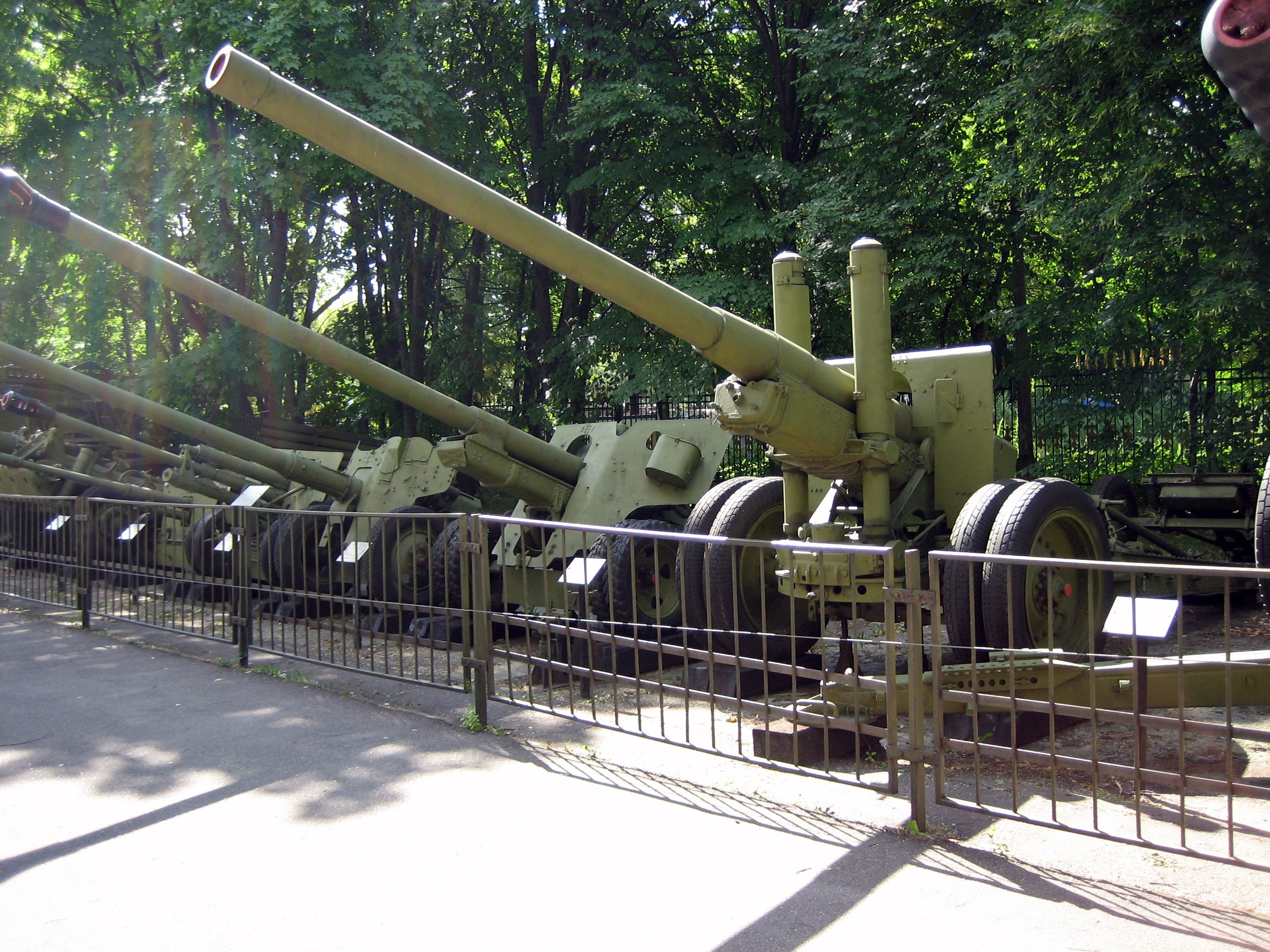
M1931 in the Central Armed Forces Museum, Moscow. Note ML-20-type wheels

As mentioned above, late production M1931s differed from early production ones. Guns manufactured starting in 1936 had free liner barrel construction in contrast to the earlier built-up barrels; in 1937 changes in breech block construction were introduced, and some late production pieces received ML-20-type wheels with pneumatic tires.

In addition, the M1931 had a number of experimental variants.

In 1933, development of a carriage with improved off-road mobility was started. The carriage in two variants – on tracks and on large, tractor-type wheels – reached trials in 1937 and was found to be not durable enough.

In 1933-36 the gun was involved in experiments with pre-rifled projectiles. For these experiments a special variant of the barrel was produced. The experiments were stopped because of inherent deficients of those projectiles, namely more complicated loading process and lower accuracy.

Another variant, with bag loading, designated Br-3, reached trials in 1937, but was not adopted.

The carriage of M1931, almost unmodified, was used for the 152 mm gun M1910/34.

As already mentioned, in Finland carriages of the A-19 were fitted with 152 mm barrels, resulting in two models:

- 152 H 37-31 – with barrel of the Soviet ML-20,
- 152 H 88-31 – with 152 mm L/32 barrels manufactured by Vammas.

== Summary ==
The M1931 was one of the first Soviet artillery pieces to feature split trail carriage. This carriage construction allowed for much better traverse angles compared to earlier single trail or box trail carriages. Good elevation angle and ability to use different propellant charges made the gun flexible indirect fire weapon, and its ballistics were powerful enough to make it useful in direct fire role against enemy armor (though, as mentioned above, it was not an ideal anti-tank gun because of its size, traverse speed and rate of fire).

The carriage of M1931 had a number of shortcomings though. The elevation mechanism was slow and unreliable; solid-tired wheels hindered mobility to some extent; there were technological problems in carriage production. These shortcomings eventually led to adopting a better carriage, creating the M1931/37.

As calibers similar to 122 mm were not typical for western field artillery of World War II era, pieces directly comparable to the M1931 were rare.

The German 10.5 cm sK 18 was significantly lighter (5.64 t) while having about the same range (19 km), but fired much smaller 15 kg shell; on the other side, the 15 cm K 18 was heavy (combat weight 12.46 t), limited production (101 pieces) weapon, more comparable to the Soviet 152 mm Br-2. Late in the war Germans worked on a number of 128 mm field guns; one of these designs, the 12.8 cm K 81/2, was a gun with combat weight of 8.2 t, based on a heavily modified carriage of captured 152 mm ML-20. However, little is known about its characteristics; None of these 128 mm designs reached mass production.

British Army and U.S. Army both employed 4.5-inch (114 mm) pieces with similar characteristics, and designed to utilize the same ammunition – BL 4.5-inch medium field gun and 4.5-inch gun M1 respectively. The 5.65-ton M1 fired a 24.9 kg shell to the maximum range of 19.3 km; however the only type of ammunition available for the gun was a HE-frag shell, and that contained only about two kg of explosives.

== Ammunition ==
The gun fired separate loading, cased charge ammunition, with one of four possible propellant charges – the full, no. 1, no. 2 and no. 3 (the smallest). In addition to 122 mm gun shells, the A-19 could fire 122 mm howitzer shells; however because of lesser durability of those shells they could not be used with full charge; use of steely iron howitzer shells O-460A and O-462A was prohibited.

Available ammunition
Type	Model	Projectile weight, kg	HE weight, kg	Muzzle velocity, m/s	Range, m
Armor-piercing shells
АРНЕ	BR-471	25.0	0.156	800	4,000
АРНЕВС (from early 1945)	BR-471B	25.0		800	4,000
High-explosive and fragmentation shells
HE-Fragmentation, gun	OF-471H	25.0	3.8	800	19,800
HE-Fragmentation, gun	OF-471	25.0	3.6	800	19,800
HE-Fragmentation, howitzer	OF-462	21.7	3.67	765 (charge no. 1)	16,600
HE-Fragmentation, gun	OF-471В
HE-Fragmentation, gun	OF-472
Anti-concrete shells
Anti-concrete, gun	G-471	25.0	2.2	800	20,400
Chemical shells
Fragmentation/chemical, gun	OH-471	25.0		800	19,800
Chemical, howitzer	H-462	21.8		705 (charge no. 2)	19,800

Armour penetration table
АРНЕВС shell BR-471B
Distance, m	Meet angle 60°, mm	Meet angle 90°, mm
500	125	155
1,000	120	145
1,500	110	135
2,000	100	125
3,000	85	105
APHE shell BR-471
Distance, m	Meet angle 60°, mm	Meet angle 90°, mm
500	120	150
1,000	105	130
1,500	95	115
2,000	80	100
3,000	65	75
Different methods of armor penetration measurement were used in different countries / periods. Therefore, direct comparison is often impossible.

== Surviving pieces ==
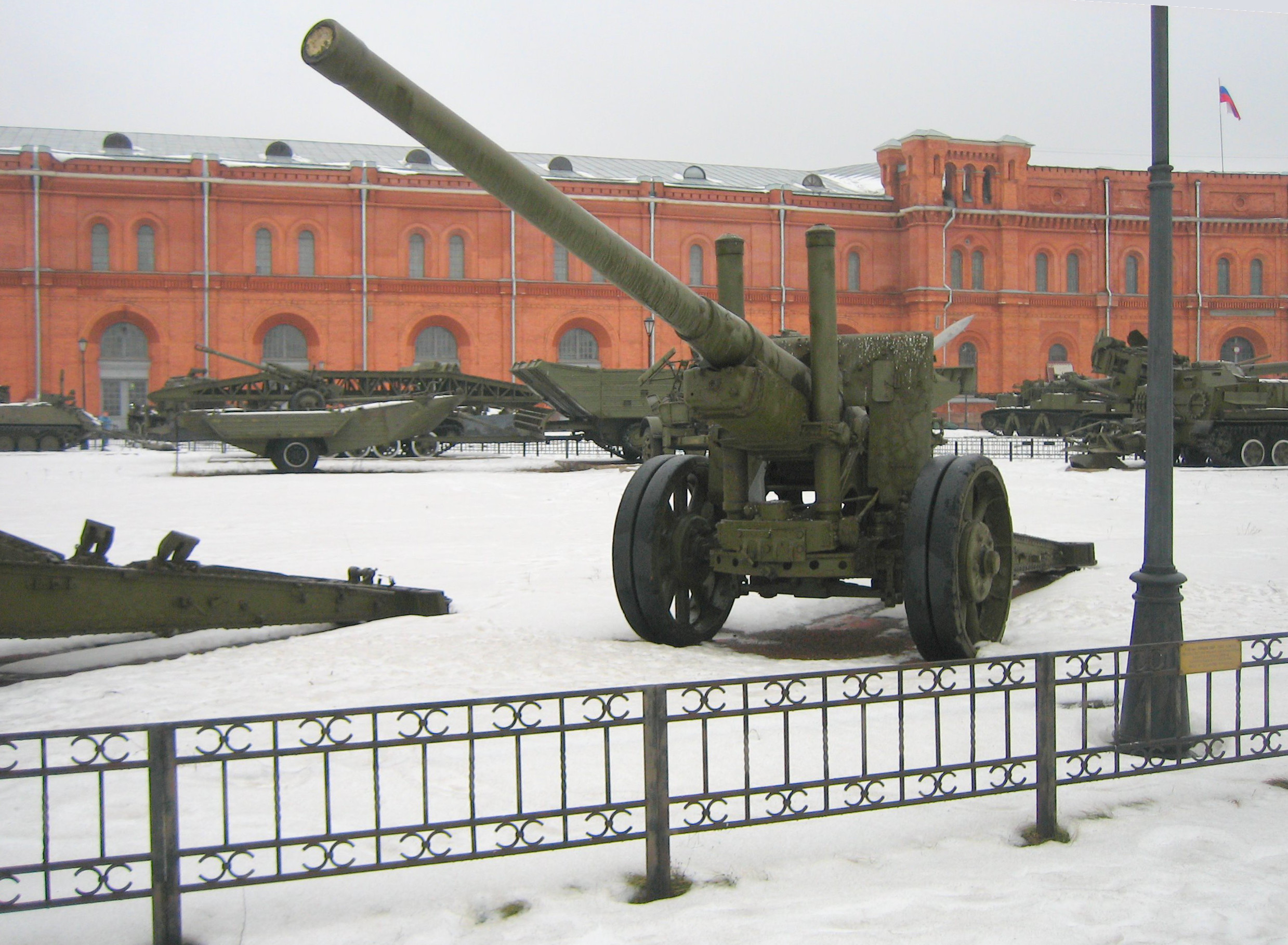
M1931 in the Museum of Artillery and Engineering Forces, St. Petersburg

The M1931 can be seen:

- In the Central Armed Forces Museum, Moscow, Russia.
- In the Museum of Artillery and Engineering Forces, Saint Petersburg, Russia.
- In the Artillery Museum in Hämeenlinna, Finland.
