= 152 mm howitzer =

152 mm howitzer may refer to:

- 152 mm howitzer M1910/37
- 152-mm howitzer M1943 (D-1)
- 152 mm towed gun-howitzer M1955 (D-20)
- 152 mm ML-20 field howitzer
- Gun-howitzer M84 NORA
- 152 mm siege gun M1910
- 152 mm howitzer 2A65
- 2S3 Akatsiya
- 2S5 Giatsint-S
- 2S19 Msta
- 2A36 Giatsint-B
