= Designations of Russian artillery =

The official designations of Russian and Soviet artillery consists of three sequential parts – weapon caliber, weapon type, and finally a unique identifier for each variant. This system is descended from the later Russian Empire, but its first (caliber) and third (unique identifier) components were changed several times over the years.

== Origin - Russian Empire ==
After abolishing the old system of designations based on projectile or gun weight during the early years of the 20th century, Imperial Russian Army designation policy was simplified. The first component of the designation was caliber in inches or lines, then type of a piece with optional producer's name and attributes such as regimental, divisional, siege, field, fortress, etc. follows and the year of adopting the piece onto Army service finishes the name. E. g. howitzer with Schneider designation O. C. 6″ Bas became 6-дюймовая крепостная гаубица обр. 1909 г. (6-inch fortress howitzer Model of 1909) and Canon de 42‴ Schneider was designated 42-линейная полевая тяжёлая пушка образца 1910 года (42-line heavy field gun M1910).

== Metric system (1917) ==
After the October Revolution, the first change in this new system took place, when Soviet Union officially adopted the metric system and abolished old non-metric measurement units. From this point until the present caliber is expressed in millimeters; the fractional part of the caliber was rounded to the nearest integer value. In some cases, the attributes were simplified. Examples of these modified designations include 76-мм дивизионная пушка обр. 1902 г. (76 mm divisional gun M1902, formerly 3-inch divisional gun M1902) or 152-мм пушка обр. 1910 года (152 mm gun M1910, formerly 6-inch siege gun M1910).

== Modernized weapons ==
The industrial growth of the Soviet Union during the late 1920s and the 1930s allowed the modernization of older or obsolescent artillery. Modernized ordnance received a second model designation after a slash, for example 152-мм пушка обр. 1910/30 гг. (152 mm gun M1910/30). In case of further modernizations of the piece, the intermediate modernizations were not reflected in the name, for example the later modernization was 152-мм пушка обр. 1910/34 гг. (152 mm gun M1910/34).

== Army designation versus factory designation ==
After 1930, newly designed or constructed towed artillery received two official designations, the first of which was the traditional Army designation, e.g., 122-мм гаубица обр. 1938 г. (122 mm howitzer M1938), but another one was the index of a factory (or a developer: ordnance plants in the Soviet Union very often had their own design bureaus). This consisted of between one and three letters and the project number. For the 122 mm howitzer M1938 mentioned above, the developer index was M-30. Letters identified the developer or producer. For example, M stands for Motovilikha plant No. 172, A - for KhPZ No. 183, B – for ‘Bolshevik’ plant, S – for Central Artillery Design Bureau, D – for Factory No. 9 and so on.

There were two exceptions: ‘Arsenal’ plant No. 7 (they used a '7' digit instead of a letter) and the artillery plant No. 8 named after Mikhail Kalinin (their project number was placed first, followed by the 'K' letter). Examples of these designations include 7-2 and 61-K or 20K (variants with and without a dash are both widely used in historical documents).

During the World War II some indices changed:

- Plant No.7 was named after Mikhail Frunze circa 1940 and changed index to 'ZIF';
- Plant No. 8 after evacuation to Sverdlovsk used 'KS' index placed before the project number;
- Plant No. 92 got index 'ZIS' after renaming to Zavod imeni Stalina in December 1940 or January 1941.

The artillery sharashka OTB of NKVD (in 1938—1941 and 1944—1953 it was located in Kresty Prison complex in Leningrad, in evacuation it was housed in the buildings of Plant No. 172 and named OKB-172) had no special index, but often used 'BL' letters after Lavrentiy Beria.

For some pieces of artillery, both the Army and developer names were well known and interchangeable, such as the 76 mm divisional gun M1942 known also as ZIS-3. For some other guns, such as the 45 mm anti-tank gun M1937, the developer index (53-K) was very rarely used, even in literature of the time.

== Further modifications - 1950s ==
This system was used throughout and well after the Second World War. In the 1950s, another change took place. The year was dropped from the official names of newly designed pieces, and instead of the M19XX (обр. 19ХХ г.), the developer index became used as the unique identifier, e.g., 122-мм гаубица Д-30 (122 mm howitzer D-30). The change was not applied to old pieces, e.g., the D-1 was still referenced as a 152 mm howitzer M1943, and not as a 152 mm howitzer D-1.

The third change was connected with introduction of the GRAU system of indices for ordnance, weapons, and munitions. After this introduction, the developer index was dropped from the official piece name (but it still officially exists through the design and testing process); henceforth, the GRAU designation was used as the unique identifier, e.g., 152-мм пушка 2А36 (152 mm gun 2A36). This is the current system used by the Russian Federation's Agency for Missiles and Artillery (still known as GRAU) and the Russian Strategic Rocket Forces.
