= K39 =

K39 may refer to:

- 15 cm Kanone 39, a German heavy gun used in the Second World War
- Junkers K 39, a German prototype reconnaissance-bomber built 1926
- K-39 (Kansas highway), a state highway in Kansas
- Piano Concerto No. 2 (Mozart), K. 39, by Wolfgang Amadeus Mozart
- K-39, a 1964 studio album by surf rock band The Challengers
- Potassium-39 (K-39 or ^{39}K), an isotope of potassium
