= 152 mm gun M1910/34 =

152-mm gun model 1910/34
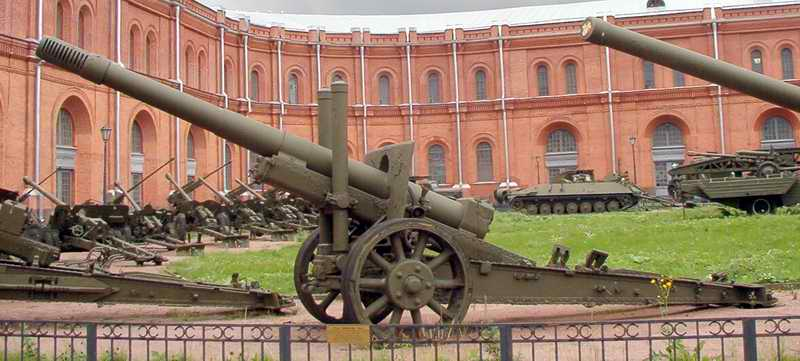
- 152-mm gun M1910/34 in the Artillery Museum, St Petersburg, Russia
- Type: Heavy field gun
- Place of origin: Soviet Union

Production history
- No. built: 275

Specifications
- Mass: Combat: 7,100 kg (15,653 lbs); Travel: 7,820 kg (17,240 lbs) (with limber)
- Length: 8.10 m (26 ft 7 in)
- Barrel length: Bore: 4.24 m (13 ft 11 in) L/27.9; Overall: 4.40 m (14 ft 5 in) L/29 (without muzzle brake)
- Width: 2.34 m (7 ft 8 in)
- Height: 1.99 m (6 ft 6 in)
- Crew: 9
- Caliber: 152.4 mm (6 in)
- Breech: interrupted screw
- Recoil: Hydro-pneumatic
- Carriage: split trail
- Elevation: -4° to +45°
- Traverse: 56°
- Rate of fire: 3-4 rounds per minute
- Muzzle velocity: 665 m/s (2,180 ft/s)
- Maximum firing range: 17,265 m (18,881 yd)

152-mm gun model 1910/34 (Russian: 152-мм пушка образца 1910/34 годов) was a Soviet 152.4 mm (6 inch) heavy gun, a modernization of the 152-mm gun M1910/30, which in turn was based on 152-mm siege gun M1910.

== Description ==
M1910/34 combined a barrel of the M1910/30 with a carriage of the 122 mm gun M1931 (A-19). The barrel was of built-up construction; it was equipped with interrupted screw breechblock and recoil system consisting of hydraulic buffer and hydro-pneumatic recuperator. The split-trail carriage had leaf spring suspension and wheels with solid rubber tires.

== Development and production history ==
The first upgrade of the 152-mm siege gun M1910 resulted in a weapon with improved characteristics, but didn't address some significant shortcomings, namely insufficient mobility (due to unsprung carriage and separate transportation of barrel) and limited traverse. The new modernization was an attempt to solve these problems by using a modern split trail carriage of the 122-mm gun M1931. A prototype went through ground trials starting 16 May 1934. The trials lasted until 16 January 1935, then the gun was given to the army for testing. The responses were mostly positive, and the gun was officially adopted as 152-mm gun model 1910/34. Because of its maximum elevation angle of 45°, it was sometimes referred to as howitzer. In fact, even the developers initially called the piece 152-mm howitzer model 1932 and later 152-mm howitzer model 1934. The latter name can also be seen in some official documentation.

Production at the Perm plant started in 1934 and continued until 1937, with a total of 275 pieces built.

== Organization and employment ==
According to RKKA organization, 152-mm guns were employed by corps artillery and by the Reserve of the Main Command, typically instead of 152-mm gun-howitzer M1937 (ML-20). Heavy gun regiments of Reserve of the Main Command had 24 pieces each.

According to different sources, at the outbreak of Great Patriotic War the Red Army possessed either 146 M1910/34s or all 275 pieces. These undoubtfully saw combat in the war, though due to their limited number the details of their service are unknown. A few pieces were captured by Germans which adopted them as 15,2 cm K.433/2(r).

== Summary ==
The second modernization of the M1910 significantly improved mobility and traverse of the gun. The barrel was not transported separately anymore, which meant much faster set up time. Improved elevation led to slightly longer range. However, there were still some problems. The elevation mechanism was combined with the equilibrator in a single device - a construction which resulted in slow elevation. The maximum elevation angle of 45° was considered insufficient. Some elements of the gun, mostly of the upper carriage, were hard to produce. As a result, more attempts to improve the design followed, eventually resulting in the 152-mm gun-howitzer M1937 (ML-20).

== Ammunition ==
Available ammunition
Type	Model	Weight, kg	HE weight, kg	Muzzle velocity, m/s	Range, m
Armor-piercing shells
APHE	BR-540	48.8	0.66	600	4,000
APBC (from late 1944)	BR-540B	46.5	0.48	600	4,000
Naval semi-AP	model 1915/28	51.07	3.2	573	5,000
HEAT	BP-540	27.44		680	3,000
Anti-concrete shells
Anti-concrete howitzer shell	G-530 / G-530Sh	40.0	5.1
Anti-concrete gun shell	G-545	56.0	4.2
High-explosive and fragmentation shells
Gun shells
HE-Fragmentation, steel	OF-540	43.6	5.9-6.25
HE-Fragmentation, steel	OF-540Zh	43.6	5.9-6.25
HE, old	F-542	38.1	5.86
HE, old	F-542G	38.52	5.83
HE, old	F-542ShG	41.0	5.93
HE, old	F-542Sh	40.6	6.06
HE, old	F-542ShU	40.86	5.96
HE, old	F-542U	38.36	5.77
Howitzer shells
HE-Fragmentation, steel	OF-530	40.0	5.47-6.86
HE-Fragmentation, steely iron	OF-530A	40.0	5.66
HE, old	F-533	40.41	8.0
HE, old	F-533K	40.68	7.3
HE, old	F-533N	41.0	7.3
HE, old	F-533U	40.8	8.8
HE, steely iron, old French	F-534F	41.1	3.9
HE for 152-mm mortar model 1931	F-521	41.7	7.7
HE, British, for Vickers 152-mm howitzer	F-531	44.91	5.7
Shrapnel shells
Shrapnel with 45 sec. tube	Sh-501	41.16-41.83	0.5 (680—690 bullets)
Shrapnel with Т-6 tube	Sh-501T	41.16	0.5 (680—690 bullets)
Illumination shells
Illumination, 40 sec.	S 1	40.2
Chemical shells
Fragmentation-chemical gun shell	OH-540
Chemical howitzer shell	HS-530	38.8
Chemical howitzer shell	HN-530	39.1
Chemical (post-war)	ZHZ

Armour penetration table
APHE shell BR-540
Distance, m	Meet angle 60°, mm	Meet angle 90°, mm
500	105	125
1000	95	115
1500	85	105
2000	75	90
APBC shell BR-540B
Distance, m	Meet angle 60°, mm	Meet angle 90°, mm
500	105	130
1000	100	120
1500	95	115
2000	85	105
Naval semi-AP model 1915/28
Distance, m	Meet angle 60°, mm	Meet angle 90°, mm
100	110	136
500	104	128
1000	97	119
1500	91	111
2000	85	105
This data was obtained by Soviet methodics of armour penetration measurement (penetration probability equals 75%). It is not directly comparable with western data of similar type.
