= 152 mm howitzer-gun M1937 (ML-20) =

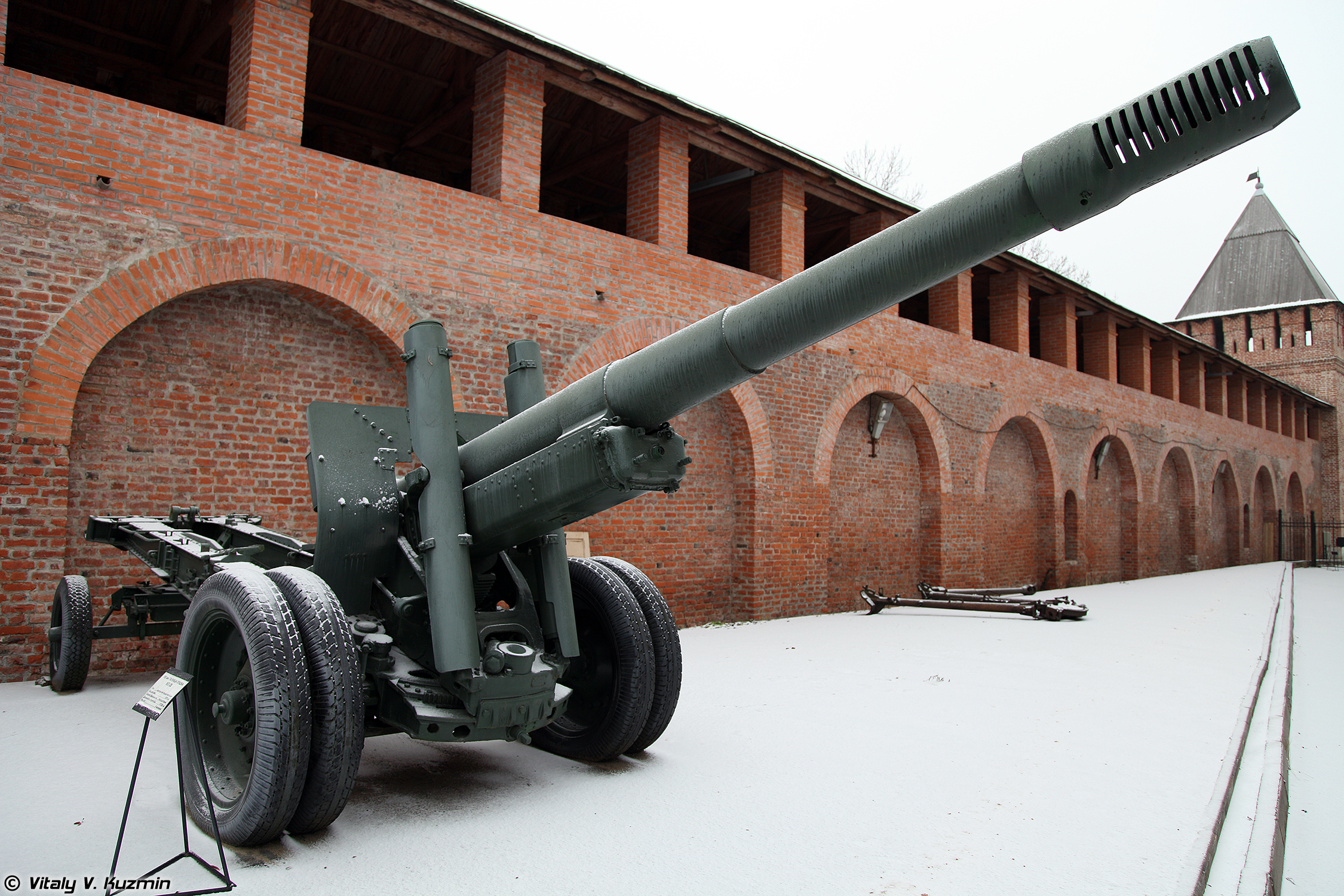
- A surviving gun in the Museum of the Great Patriotic War in Smolensk
- Type: Heavy gun-howitzer
- Place of origin: Soviet Union

Service history
- Used by: See users
- Wars: Winter War; World War II; Six-Day War; Yom Kippur War

Production history
- Designer: Design bureau of No. 172 Plant, headed by F. F. Petrov
- Produced: 1937–1947
- No. built: 6,884

Specifications
- Mass: combat: 7,270 kg (16,030 lb); travel: 7,930 kg (17,480 lb)
- Length: 8.18 m (26 ft 10 in) (with limber; barrel pulled back)
- Barrel length: bore: 4.24 m (13 ft 11 in) L/27.9 overall: 4.412 m (10 ft) L/29 (without muzzle brake)
- Width: 2.35 m (7 ft 9 in)
- Height: 2.27 m (7 ft 5 in)
- Shell: 152×547mmR
- Caliber: 152.4 mm (6 in)
- Breech: interrupted screw
- Recoil: hydro-pneumatic
- Carriage: split trail
- Elevation: −2°/65°
- Traverse: 58°
- Rate of fire: 3–4 rounds per minute
- Muzzle velocity: 655 m/s (2,150 ft/s)
- Maximum firing range: 17.23 km (10.7 mi)

The 152 mm howitzer-gun M1937 (ML-20) (Russian: 152-мм гаубица-пушка обр. 1937 г. (МЛ-20)), is a Soviet heavy gun-howitzer. The gun was developed by the design bureau of the plant no 172, headed by F. F. Petrov, as a deep upgrade of the 152-mm gun M1910/34, in turn based on the 152-mm siege gun M1910, a pre-World War I design by Schneider. It was in production from 1937 to 1946. The ML-20 saw action in World War II, mainly as a corps / army level artillery piece of the Soviet Army. Captured guns were employed by Wehrmacht and the Finnish Army. Post World War II, the ML-20 saw combat in numerous conflicts during the mid to late twentieth century.

== Description ==
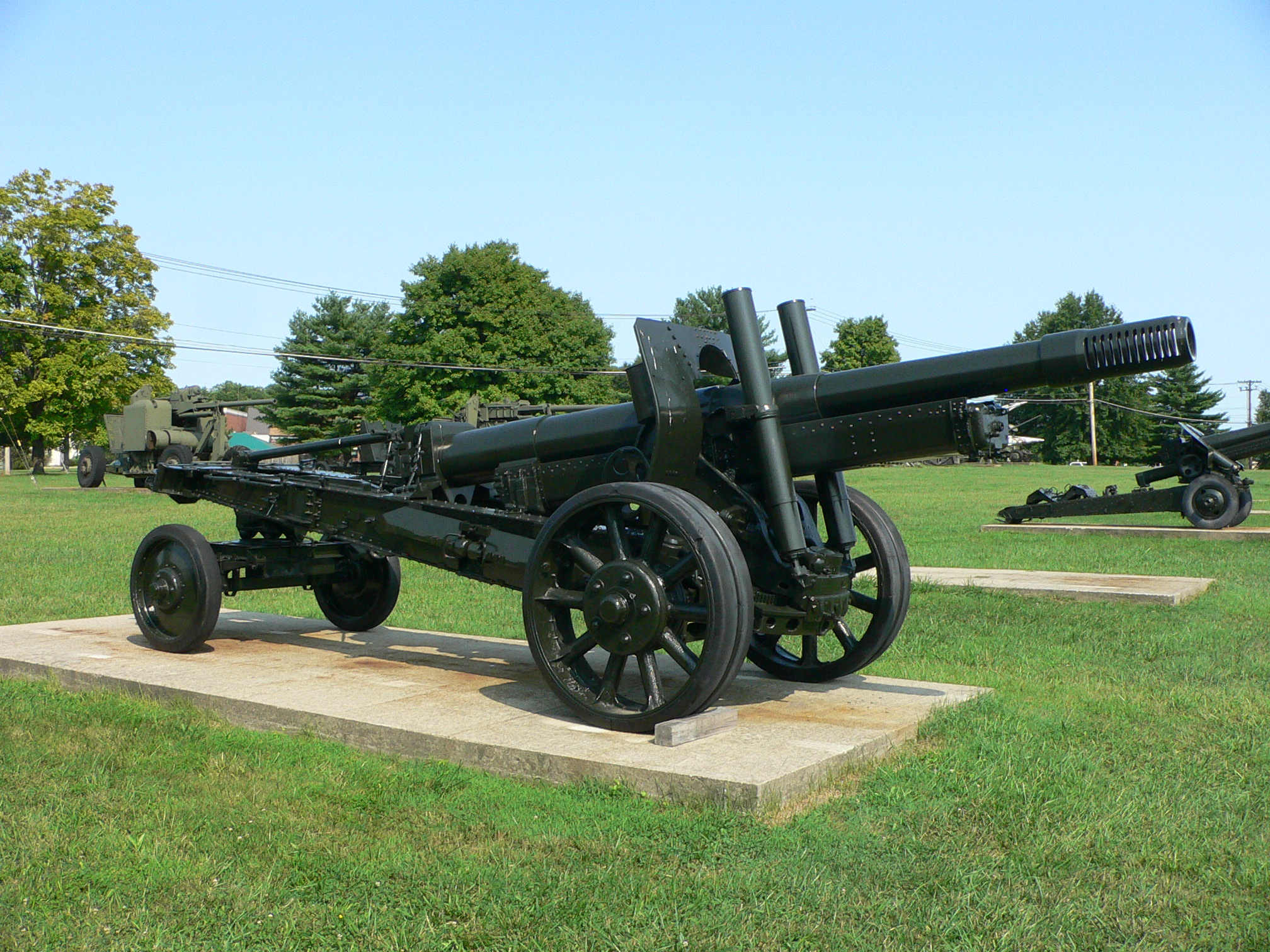
ML-20 in traveling position, displayed at the US Army Ordnance Museum; note spoked wheels.

The ML-20 was officially classified as howitzer-gun, i.e. an artillery system which combines characteristics of a howitzer and (to lesser extent) of a gun and therefore can be used in both roles. This universality was achieved by wide range of elevation angles and by using separate loading with 13 different propellant loads. The gun was fitted with both telescopic sight for direct fire and panoramic sight for an indirect one. For ballistic calculations and meteorological corrections a special mechanical device was developed. The device, called meteoballistic summator, consisted of a specialized slide rule and a pre-calculated table. After World War II similar devices were introduced for other types of guns.

The barrel was either monobloc or built-up. Some sources indicate that a third type—with loose liner—also existed. To soften recoil, a large slotted muzzle brake was fitted. The breechblock was of interrupted screw type, with forced extraction of cartridge during opening. A safety lock prevented opening of the breechblock before the shot; if there was a need to remove a shell, the lock had to be disabled. To assist loading when the barrel was set to high elevation angle, the breech was equipped with cartridge holding mechanism. The gun was fired by pulling a trigger-cord.

The recoil system consisted of a hydraulic buffer and hydro-pneumatic recuperator. Each held 22 litres of liquid. Pressure in the recuperator reached 45 Bar.

The carriage was of split trail type, with shield and balancing mechanism, leaf spring suspension and steel wheels with rubber tires (some early production pieces received spoked wheels with solid tires from M1910/34). During transportation the barrel was usually retracted. The gun could also be towed with the barrel in its normal position, but in this case the transportation speed was limited, about 4–5 km/h (compared to 20 km/h with barrel pulled back). The gun could be set up for combat in 8–10 minutes. The carriage, designated 52-L-504A, was also used in the 122-mm gun model 1931/37 (A-19).

This gun was also mounted in two Soviet assault guns/tank destroyers employed during World War II. These are the SU-152 and ISU-152.

== Development history ==
Among other artillery pieces the Red Army (RKKA) inherited from the Imperial Russian Army a 152-mm siege gun M1910, developed by Schneider. The gun was modernized twice in 1930s, resulting in the 152-mm gun M1910/30 and the 152-mm gun M1910/34. However, its mobility, maximum elevation and speed of traverse still needed improvement. In 1935–36 the No. 172 Plant in Motovilikha tried to continue the modernization works, but the Main Artillery Directorate (GAU) insisted on more significant upgrade.

Consequently, the design bureau of the plant developed two guns ML-15 and ML-20. While the former project was initiated by GAU, the latter started as private development; the team working on it was led by F. F. Petrov. Both guns used barrel and recoil system of the M1910/34. The ML-20 also inherited the wheels, suspension and trails from the older gun.

The ML-15 reached ground tests in April 1936, was returned for revision and was tested again in March 1937, this time successfully. The ML-20 went through ground tests in December 1936 and through army tests next year. After some defects (mostly in carriage) were eliminated, the ML-20 was recommended for production and on 22 September 1937 it was adopted as 152-mm howitzer-gun model 1937 (Russian: 152-мм гаубица-пушка образца 1937 года (МЛ-20)).

It is not clear why the ML-20 was preferred. The ML-15 was lighter (about 500 kg less in combat position, 600 kg in traveling position) and more mobile (maximum transportation speed 45 km/h). On the negative side, the ML-15 had a more complicated carriage (however, the final version of the ML-20 carriage incorporated some features of the ML-15). Some sources claim that the choice was made because of the economic factor—the ML-20 was more similar to the M1910/34, thus requiring fewer adjustments for production.

== Production history ==
The gun was in production from 1937 to 1946. 6,884 guns were manufactured and about 4,000 ML-20S barrels were used in the SU-152 and ISU-152 self-propelled guns. The ML-20 was eventually replaced by the D-20 152 mm gun with identical ballistics, which entered production in 1956.

Production of МL-20s
Year	1937	1938	1939	1940	1941	1942	1943	1944	1945	1946	Total
Produced, pcs.	148	500	567	901	1,342	1,809	1,002	275	325	15	6,884

Smaller production rates toward the end of the war were caused by two reasons. First, most of the barrels produced in these years were ML-20S. Second, after the Soviets started to field heavy tanks such as the JS series that used the A-19 122mm gun, the plant was ordered to increase the production of the A-19 instead of the ML-20.

== Organization and employment ==
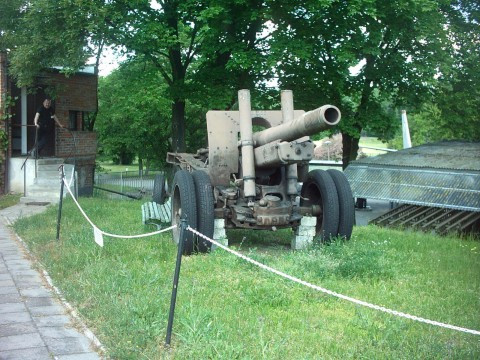
ML-20 in Poznań Citadel, Poland.

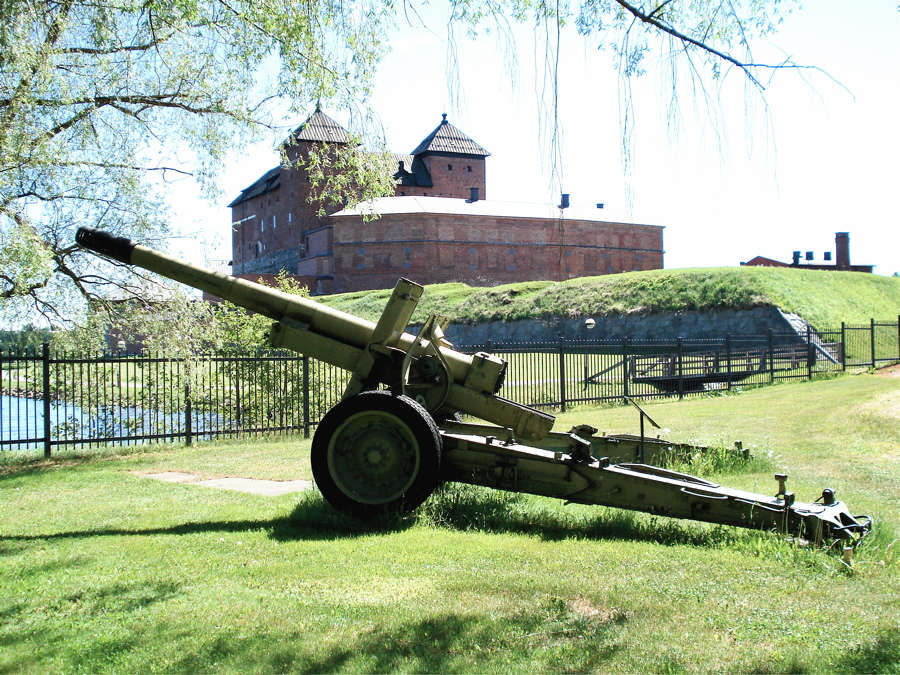
ML-20 in Hämeenlinna Artillery Museum, Finland.

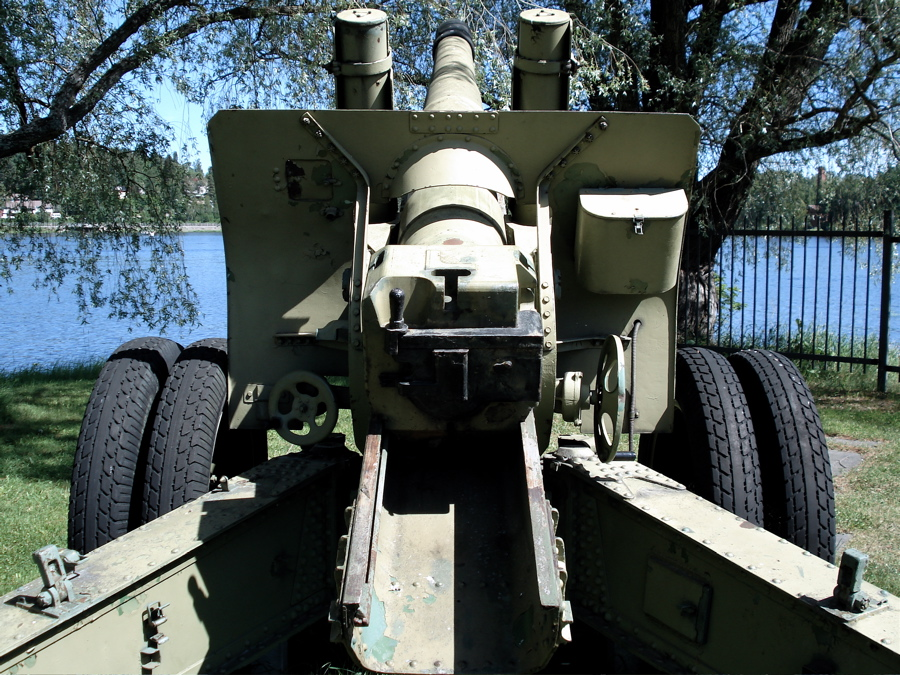
ML-20 in Hämeenlinna Artillery Museum, Finland.

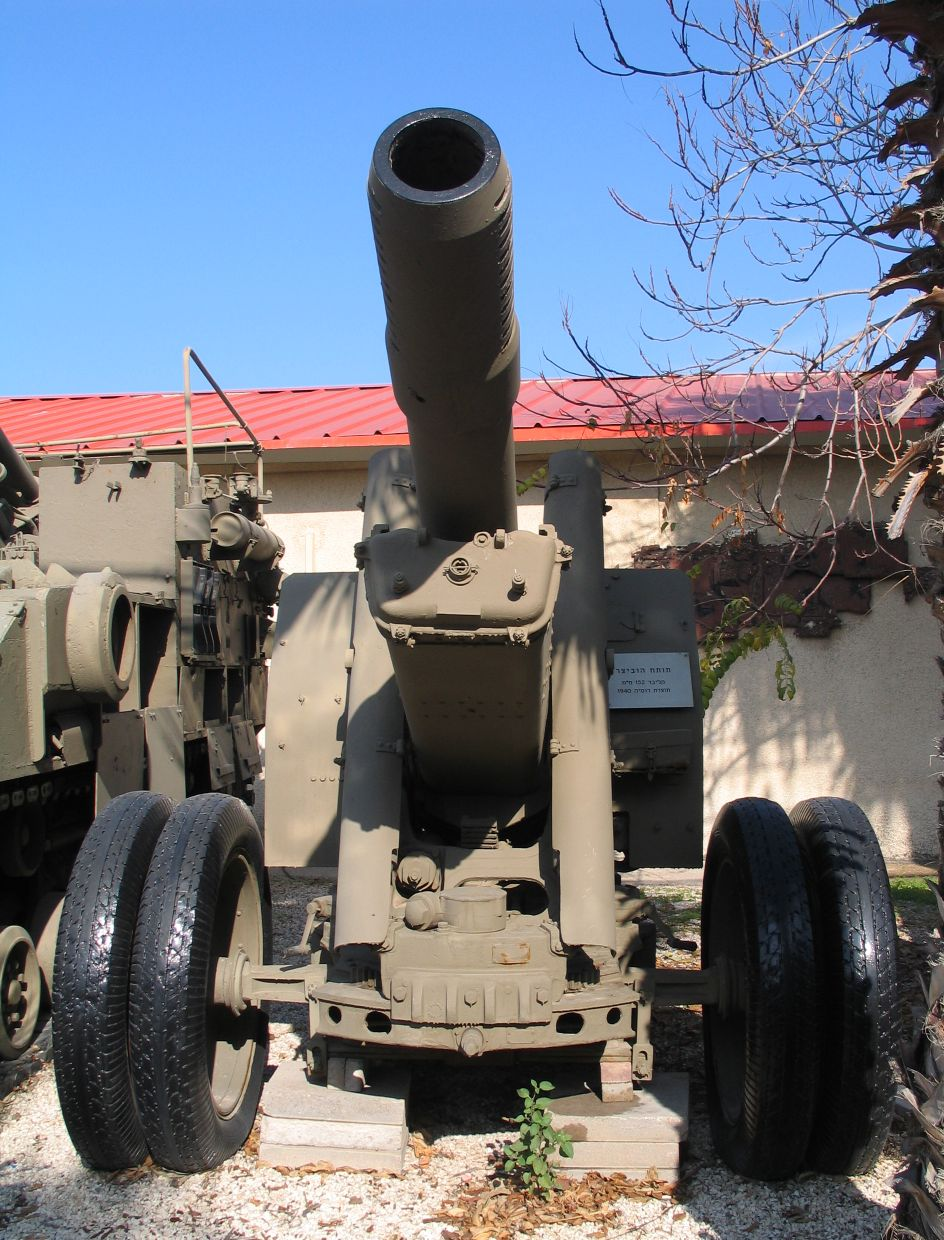
ML-20 in Batey ha-Osef Museum, Israel.

=== Red Army ===
The ML-20 was originally intended for corps artillery. Together with the 122-mm gun A-19 it formed a so-called "corps duplex". In 1940–41 there were three types of corps artillery regiments:

- With two battalions of ML-20 and one of either A-19 or 107-mm guns (a total of 24 ML-20s).
- With two battalions of ML-20 and two of either A-19 or 107-mm guns (a total of 24 ML-20s).
- With three battalions of ML-20 (a total of 36 ML-20s).

Soon after the outbreak of Operation Barbarossa, the corps artillery was eliminated (as rifle corps themselves were eliminated). It was restored later in the war. The new corps artillery regiments were supposed to be armed with 122-mm guns or 152-mm howitzers, but some memoirs mention that the ML-20 was also used.

From 1943 the gun was employed by artillery regiments of armies. Such regiments had 18 ML-20s. Guard armies from early 1945 had artillery brigades with 36 ML-20s.

The ML-20 also used by artillery regiments (24 pieces) and brigades (36 pieces) of the Reserve of the Main Command.

It was primarily used for indirect fire against enemy personnel, fortifications and key objects in the near rear. Heavy fragments of the OF-540 HE-Fragmentation shell were capable of piercing armour up to 20–30 mm thick, making a barrage dangerous to thinly armored vehicles and to some extent to heavier armoured ones as the fragments could damage chassis, sights or other elements; sometimes a close explosion caused damage inside a vehicle even though the armour remained intact. Direct hit of a shell often resulted in tearing away a turret of a medium tank or jamming it in case of a heavy tank.

The first combat use of the ML-20 was in the Battle of Khalkhin Gol, in limited numbers. It also saw combat in the Winter War against the Mannerheim Line fortifications. The gun continued to be used throughout the World War II.

Excellent characteristics of the gun, including reliability and ease of maintenance, allowed it to remain in service with the Soviet Army for a long time after the war.

=== Other operators ===
In the early stage of the German invasion of the Soviet Union hundreds of ML-20 were captured by the Wehrmacht. The gun was adopted by Germans as 15.2 cm KH.433/1(r). From February 1943 Germans manufactured ammunition for the gun.

The Finnish Army captured 37 guns of the type in 1941–44 and received additional 27 from Germany. These guns were adopted as 152 H 37. A number of barrels were mated with carriages of A-19 to create 152 H 37-31. While the gun was generally liked, the Finnish Army didn't possess enough prime movers suitable for towing such a massive piece. As a result, some of the guns were assigned to coastal artillery. Two pieces were captured back by the Red Army. A number of these guns were |modernized in 1988 and were in reserve until 2007 under the designation 152 H 88-37.

After the war the ML-20 was widely exported to Warsaw Pact allies and to many states in Asia and Africa (in some of those states the gun still remains in service). It was adopted by Egypt and Syria and saw action in Arab–Israeli conflict. In 2002 a TV documentary featured ML-20 employed by the Afghan Northern Alliance forces against the Taliban fighters; it seems likely that the guns were initially supplied to the Najibullah's regime.

In October 2025, during the Russo-Ukrainian war, Ukraine's 55th Artillery Brigade uploaded a video on their official social media accounts a video showing what appears to be a ML-20 being towed by a Russian truck in Donetsk, being followed by its destruction due to Counter-battery fire.

== Variants ==
The barrel was manufactured in two variants − monobloc or built-up. Some sources indicate that a third type – with loose liner – also existed.

Except the basic variant, the only variant to reach mass production was the ML-20S, developed for use in self-propelled guns, with differently placed controls for easier operation in small enclosed compartments.

- ML-20 with bag loading – In 1937 the Main Artillery Department decided, for economic reasons, to modify medium caliber guns to use bag loading instead of cased loading. An experimental ML-20 piece was built in 1939; the trials were unsuccessful.
- ML-20SM – Modified ML-20S with identical ballistics. muzzle brake was removed. The gun was mounted in the experimental ISU-152 model 1945, of which only one unit was built.

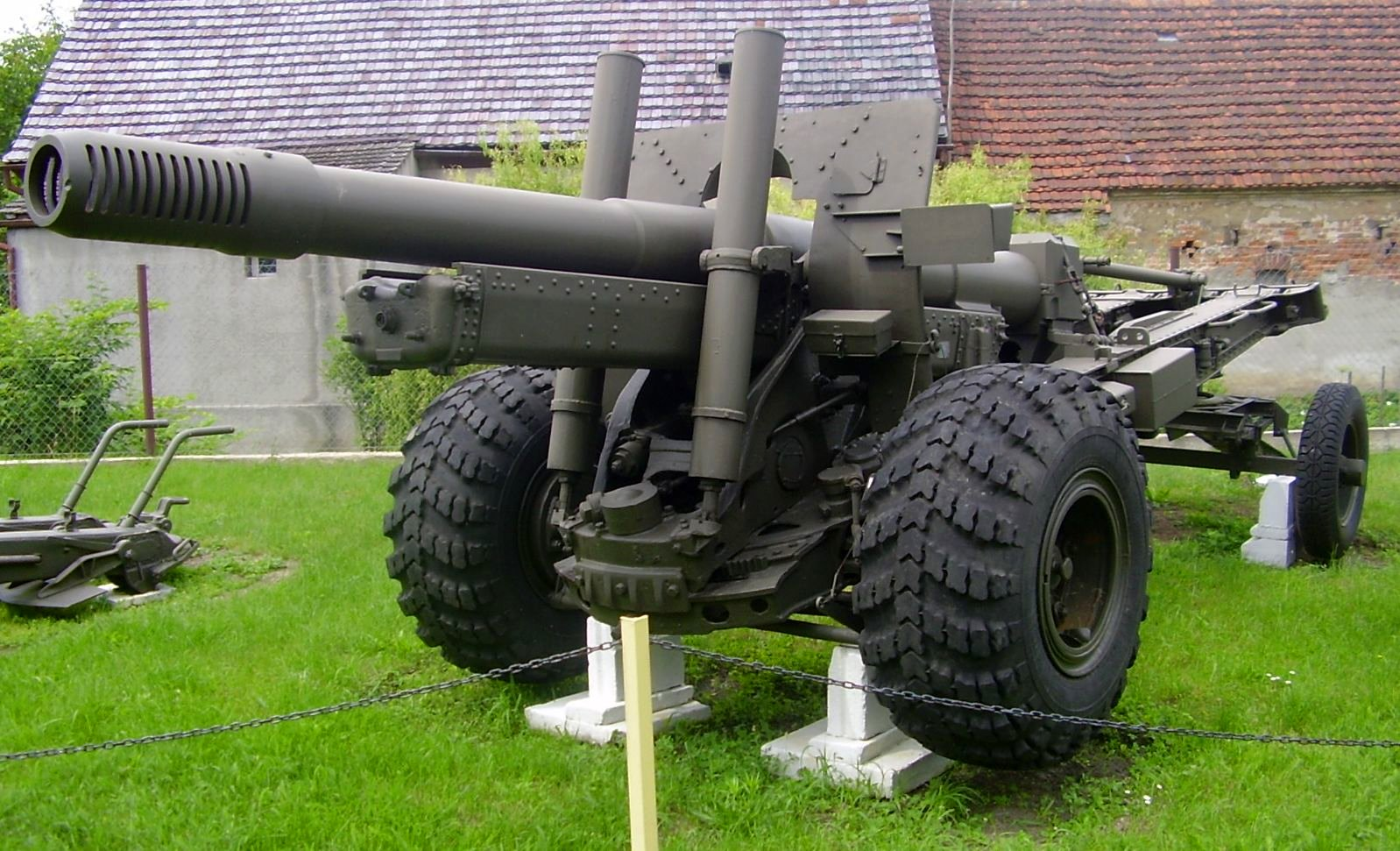
Polish 152 mm howitzer-gun wz. 37/85 Lubuskie Military Museum

- BL-20 – ML-20 with cast breech and wedge breechblock. Was developed by OKB-172 (sharashka of the NKVD) in 1946.
- ML-20 with M-46-type carriage – ML-20 with a modified carriage, resembling in construction a carriage of the M-46 130 mm gun. In 1950 an experimental piece was built and tested.
- 152 H 88-37 – A Finnish modernization program
- 152 mm haubico-armata wz. 37/85 – A Polish modernization, tires from KrAZ-255B truck, new compressed air cylinder and automotive lighting increased the road speed of the towed gun from 20 to 50 km/h and allowed the gun to be towed on public roads.

== Self-propelled mounts ==
- SU-152 – utilizing KV-1S heavy tank chassis, in production from February to December 1943, 670 units built.
- ISU-152 – utilizing IS-2 mod 1943 and 1944 heavy tank chassis, in production from November 1943 to 1946, 3,242 units built.
- Object 704 (ISU-152 model 1945) – a single prototype utilizing parts from IS-3 heavy tank chassis.

== Summary ==
The ML-20 was one of the most successful Soviet artillery pieces of World War II. Its characteristics positioned it between classical short-range howitzers and special long-range guns. Compared to the former, the ML-20 has better range (e.g. the German 15 cm sFH 18 had range of 13.3 km), which often allowed it to shell positions of enemy artillery while remaining immune to enemy fire. Its advantage over the latter was in weight and cost, and therefore in mobility and production rate. For example, the German 15 cm K 39 with range of 24.7 km weighed 12.2 tons had only 61 pieces built. The excellent 17 cm K 18 (23.4 t, 29.6 km) had 338 pieces manufactured. The lighter 10.5 cm sK 18 (5.6 t, 19.1 km) was more common (2,135 pieces) but its 15 kg shell was much less powerful than a 44 kg shell of ML-20. German attempts to produce an analogue to the ML-20 were unsuccessful. The 15 cm sFH 40 was never produced due to construction defects; the 15 cm sFH 42 had insufficient range and only 46 pieces were built. In 1943 and 1944 Wehrmacht announced requirements for a 15 cm howitzer with a range of 18 km, but none reached production.

Of other guns with more or less similar characteristics, there were French 155 mm guns model 1917 and 1918 with longer range, but some 3.5 tons heavier (as was the US 155 mm Long Tom). The Czechoslovak howitzer K4 (used by Germans as 15 cm sFH 37(t)) was about 2 tons lighter, but with range more than 2 km shorter and only 178 pieces were built. The Italian Cannone da 149/40 modello 35 had a range of 23.7 km but had a weight of 11 tons and less than 100 pieces were built. The British BL 5.5 inch (140 mm) Medium Gun probably had the closest characteristics; weight slightly over six tons and range of 18,100 yd (16,600 m) with an 82 lb (37 kg) shell.

The main shortcomings of the ML-20 were its weight and limited mobility. As the experience of the ML-15 project suggests, the gun could be made somewhat lighter and more suitable for high-speed transportation. The use of a muzzle brake can be seen as a minor flaw: while softening the recoil and thus allowing the use of a lighter carriage, a muzzle brake has the disadvantage of redirecting some of the gases that escape the barrel toward the ground, where they can raise dust, potentially revealing the gun position. But when the ML-20 was developed, muzzle brakes were already a common design element in artillery pieces of that class.

== Ammunition ==
=== Ammunition table ===
Available ammunition
Type	Model	Weight	Filler weight	Muzzle velocity	Range
Armor-piercing shells
APHE	BR-540	48.80 kg (107.6 lb)	0.66 kg (1.5 lb)	600 m/s (2,000 ft/s)	4,000 m (4,400 yd)
APBC (from late 1944)	BR-540B	46.5 kg (103 lb)	0.48 kg (1.1 lb)	600 m/s (2,000 ft/s)	4,000 m (4,400 yd)
Naval semi-AP	Model 1915/28 (PB-35)	51.07 kg (112.6 lb)	3.2 kg (7.1 lb)	573 m/s (1,880 ft/s)
HEAT	BP-540	27.44 kg (60.5 lb)		680 m/s (2,200 ft/s)	3,000 m (3,300 yd)
Anti-concrete shells
Anti-concrete howitzer shell	G-530 / G-530Sh	40.0 kg (88.2 lb)	5.1 kg (11 lb)
Anti-concrete gun shell	G-545	56.0 kg (123.5 lb)	4.2 kg (9.3 lb)
High-explosive and fragmentation (gun) shells
HE-Fragmentation, steel	OF-540 / OF-540Sh	43.6 kg (96 lb)	5.90–6.25 kg (13.0–13.8 lb)	655 m/s (2,150 ft/s)	17,230 m (18,840 yd)
HE, old	F-542	38.1 kg (84 lb)	5.86 kg (12.9 lb)
HE, old	F-542G	38.52 kg (84.9 lb)	5.83 kg (12.9 lb)
HE, old	F-542Sh	40.6 kg (90 lb)	6.06 kg (13.4 lb)
HE, old	F-542ShG	41.0 kg (90.4 lb)	5.93 kg (13.1 lb)
HE, old	F-542ShU	40.86 kg (90.1 lb)	5.96 kg (13.1 lb)
HE, old	F-542U	38.36 kg (84.6 lb)	5.77 kg (12.7 lb)
High-explosive and fragmentation (howitzer) shells
HE-Fragmentation, steel	OF-530	40.0 kg (88.2 lb)	5.47–6.86 kg (12.1–15.1 lb)
HE-Fragmentation, steely iron	OF-530A	40.0 kg (88.2 lb)	5.66 kg (12.5 lb)
HE, old	F-533	40.41 kg (89.1 lb)	8.0 kg (17.6 lb)
HE, old	F-533K	40.68 kg (89.7 lb)	7.3 kg (16 lb)
HE, old	F-533N	41.0 kg (90.4 lb)	7.3 kg (16 lb)
HE, old	F-533U	40.8 kg (90 lb)	8.8 kg (19 lb)
HE, steely iron, old, French	F-534F	41.1 kg (91 lb)	3.9 kg (8.6 lb)
HE, for 152-mm mortar model 1931	F-521	41.7 kg (92 lb)	7.7 kg (17 lb)
HE, British, for Vickers 152-mm howitzer	F-531	44.91 kg (99.0 lb)	5.7 kg (13 lb)
Shrapnel shells
Shrapnel with 45 sec. tube	Sh-501	41.16–41.83 kg (90.7–92.2 lb)	0.5 kg (1.1 lb) (680–690 bullets)
Shrapnel with Т-6 tube	Sh-501T	41.16 kg (90.7 lb)	0.5 kg (1.1 lb) (680–690 bullets)
Illumination shells
Illumination, 40 sec.	S 1	40.2 kg (89 lb)
Chemical shells
Fragmentation-chemical gun shell	OH-540
Chemical howitzer shell	HS-530	38.8 kg (86 lb)
Chemical howitzer shell	HN-530	39.1 kg (86 lb)
Chemical (post-war)	ZHZ

=== Ammunition abbreviations ===
English abbreviations

- AC – anti-concrete
- AC-F – anti-concrete fragmentation
- APHE – armour-piercing high-explosive
- APHE-BC – armour-piercing high-explosive ballistic-capped
- cnn. – cannon shell
- (CS) – cast steel shell
- how. – howitzer shell
- HE – high-explosive
- HE-C – high-explosive chemical
- HEF – high-explosive fragmentation
- HEAT – high-explosive anti-tank
- max. – maximum
- min. – minimum
- nav. – naval shell
- (OP) – ogive point shell (остроголовая граната)
- (RP) – round point shell (тупоголовая граната)
- SAPHE – semi armour-piercing high-explosive
- (ST) – steel shell

Russian abbreviations

- БР – prefix: бронебойные (armour-piercing)
- БП – prefix: бронебойный противотанковый (armour-piercing anti-tank)
- Г – prefix: гаубичный (howitzer) or граната (shell)
- Ж suffix: – железокерамическим пояском (cermet driving band)
- ЗХЗ – prefix: зона химического заражения (zone of chemical contamination)
- обр. – о́браз (mod)
- ОФ – prefix: осколочно фугасный (fragmentation high-explosive)
- ОХ – prefix: осколочно химический (fragmentation chemical)
- С – prefix: световой (luminous)
- Ф – prefix: фугасный (high-explosive) – suffix: французский (French)
- ХН – prefix: химический нестойкими (chemical unstable)
- ХС – prefix: химический стойкими (chemical persistent)
- Ш – prefix: шрапнель (shrapnel shell) – suffix: шрапнель (shrapnel)

=== Armour penetration table ===
Armour penetration table
APHE shell BR-540
Distance, m	Meet angle 60°, mm	Meet angle 90°, mm
500	105	125
1000	95	115
1500	85	105
2000	75	90
APBC shell BR-540B
Distance, m	Meet angle 60°, mm	Meet angle 90°, mm
500	105	130
1000	100	120
1500	95	115
2000	85	105
Naval semi-AP model 1915/28
Distance, m	Meet angle 60°, mm	Meet angle 90°, mm
100	110	136
500	104	128
1000	97	119
1500	91	111
2000	85	105
These data was obtained by Soviet methodology for armour penetration measurement (penetration probability of 75%).Values are not directly comparable with other methods for estimating penetration.

== Users ==
World War II

- Soviet Union
- Nazi Germany
- Finland
- UK – small number of captured German pieces used for evaluation
- USA – small number of captured German pieces used for evaluation

Post-war

- Soviet Union
- Afghanistan
- Albania
- Algeria
- Bulgaria – ≈165
- China
- Cuba
- Czechoslovakia
- Egypt
- Finland
- Georgia
- East Germany
- Iraq
- North Korea
- Libya – ≈25
- Mongolia
- Namibia
- Poland – 135
- Romania – 154
- Russia – ≈100
- Somalia
- Syria
- Ukraine
- Vietnam

Present Day

- Algeria – 20
- Cuba
- Mongolia
- Russia – ≈100 in storage
- Syria

== Surviving pieces ==
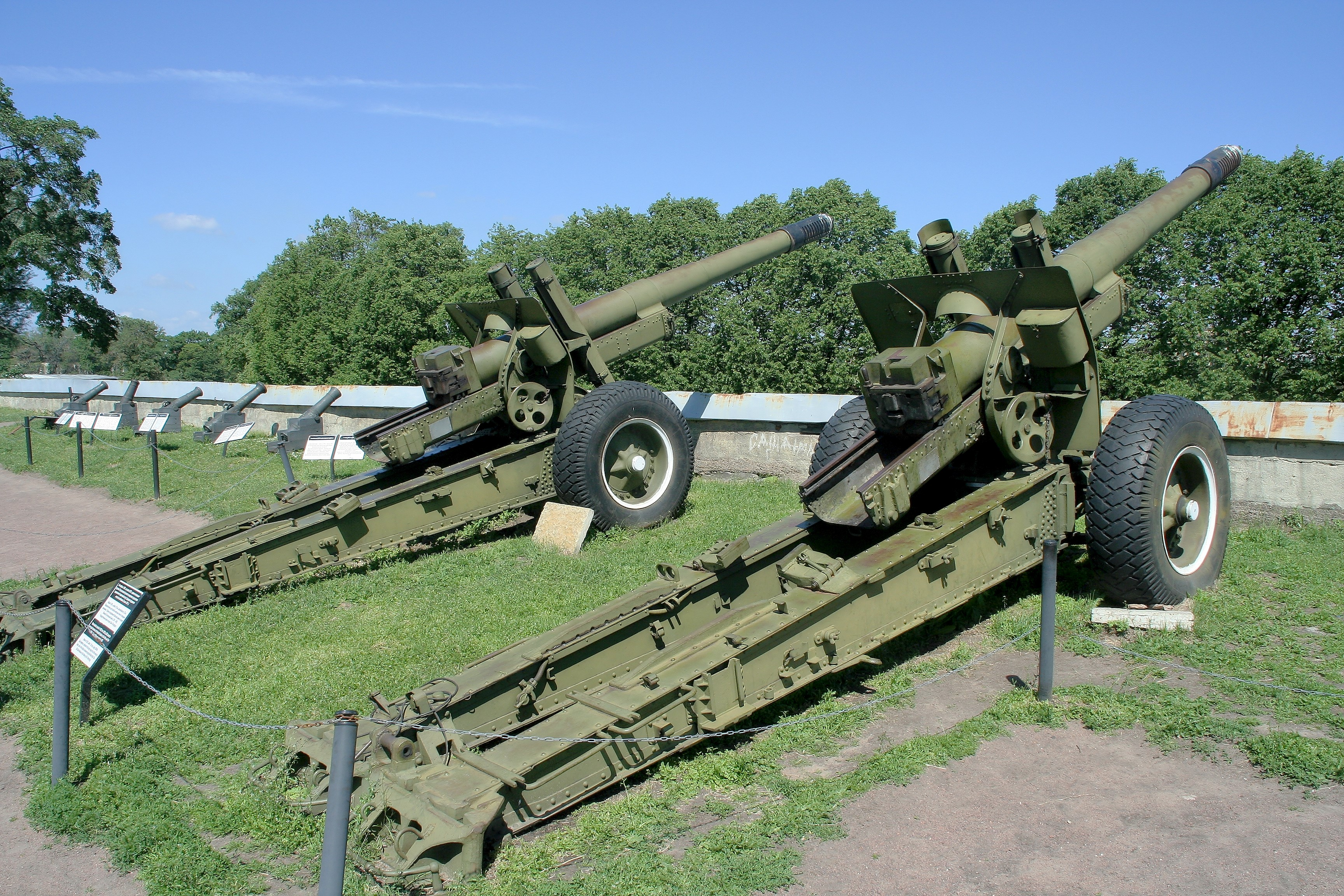
ML-20 guns in Saint Petersburg.

ML-20s are on display in a number of military museums. Among other places, the gun can be seen:

- In the Central Armed Forces Museum and at the Poklonnaya Hill, Moscow, Russia.
- In the Museum of Artillery and Engineering Forces, Saint Petersburg, Russia.
- In The Artillery Museum of Finland, Hämeenlinna, Finland.
- In the IDF History Museum (Batey ha-Osef), Tel Aviv, Israel.
- In Poznań Citadel, Poland.
- In the Lubuskie Military Museum, Drzonów, Poland.
- In the US Army Ordnance Museum, Aberdeen, Maryland, United States.
- At the Soviet War Memorial, Tiergarten, Berlin, Germany.
- In the National Military Museum, Romania, Bucharest.
- In the Military Museum, Dej, Romania.
- In the Arsenal Park resort, Orăștie, Romania.
- In the Pivka Park of Military History, Slovenia
