= 15 cm Kanone 39 =

15 cm K. 39
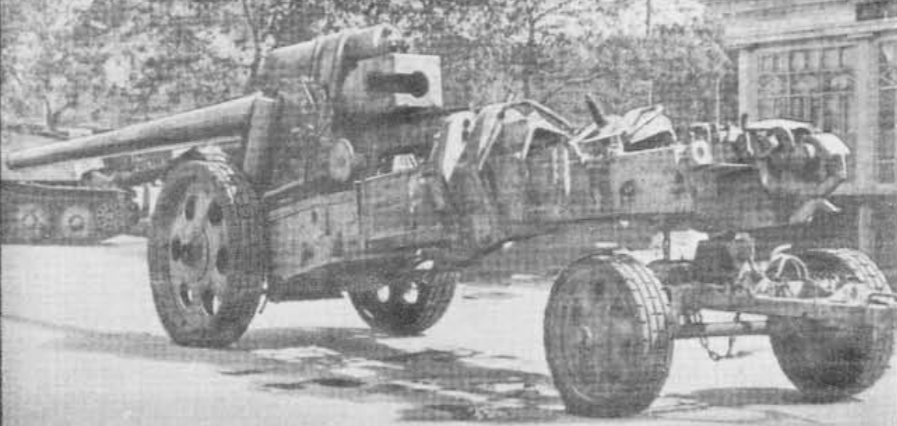
- 15 cm Kanone 39 in traveling position.
- Type: Heavy gun
- Place of origin: Nazi Germany

Service history
- Used by: Nazi Germany; Turkey
- Wars: World War II

Production history
- Designer: Krupp
- Designed: 1938
- Manufacturer: Krupp
- Produced: 1939–42?
- No. built: 61

Specifications
- Mass: combat: 12,200 kg (26,896 lbs) travel: 18,282 kg (40,305 lbs)
- Barrel length: 8.195 m (28 ft) L/55
- Shell: 149 x 815 mm R
- Shell weight: 43 kg (95 lb)
- Caliber: 149.1 mm (5.87 in)
- Breech: Horizontal sliding-block
- Recoil: Hydro-pneumatic
- Carriage: Split trail
- Elevation: -3° to +46°
- Traverse: 60° on carriage (trail legs open); 360° on platform
- Rate of fire: 2 rpm
- Muzzle velocity: 865 m/s (2,838 ft/s)
- Maximum firing range: 24.7 km (15.3 mi)

The 15 cm Kanone 39 (15 cm K. 39) was a German heavy gun used in the Second World War. First deliveries began in 1940 to the Wehrmacht. In the Battle of France, only the independent Artillerie-Batterie 698 was equipped with the gun. For Operation Barbarossa, it served with the Artillerie-Abteilungen 680, 731, 740, 800. A year later, for Fall Blau, they served with Artillerie-Abteilungen 511, 620, 680, 767, 800.

== Design and history ==
Kanone 39

Abandoned Kanone 39

Turkish Army Officers visit Germany before World War 2 to inspect the new Krupp K 39 long range Howitzer they intend to buy.

Designed by Krupp as a dual-purpose heavy field and coast defence gun in the late-1930s for Turkey. Only two had been delivered before the rest were appropriated by the Heer upon the outbreak of World War II. In the coast defense role, it was provided with an elaborate portable turntable. This had a central platform and twelve radial struts that connected to an outer ring. In action, the trails would be locked together and put on a small trolley that rode on the outer ring. Coarse aiming was by cranking the trolley back and forth while fine laying was done by traversing the gun on its mount, up to the 6° limit imposed by the closed trails.

For transport, it broke down into two loads, the barrel being removed and carried on its own wagon. A third wagon was necessary to carry the firing platform. It could fire the same ammunition as the 15 cm Kanone 18 as well as its own special ammunition designed to Turkish specifications.
