= 152 mm gun M1910/30 =

152 mm gun model 1910/30
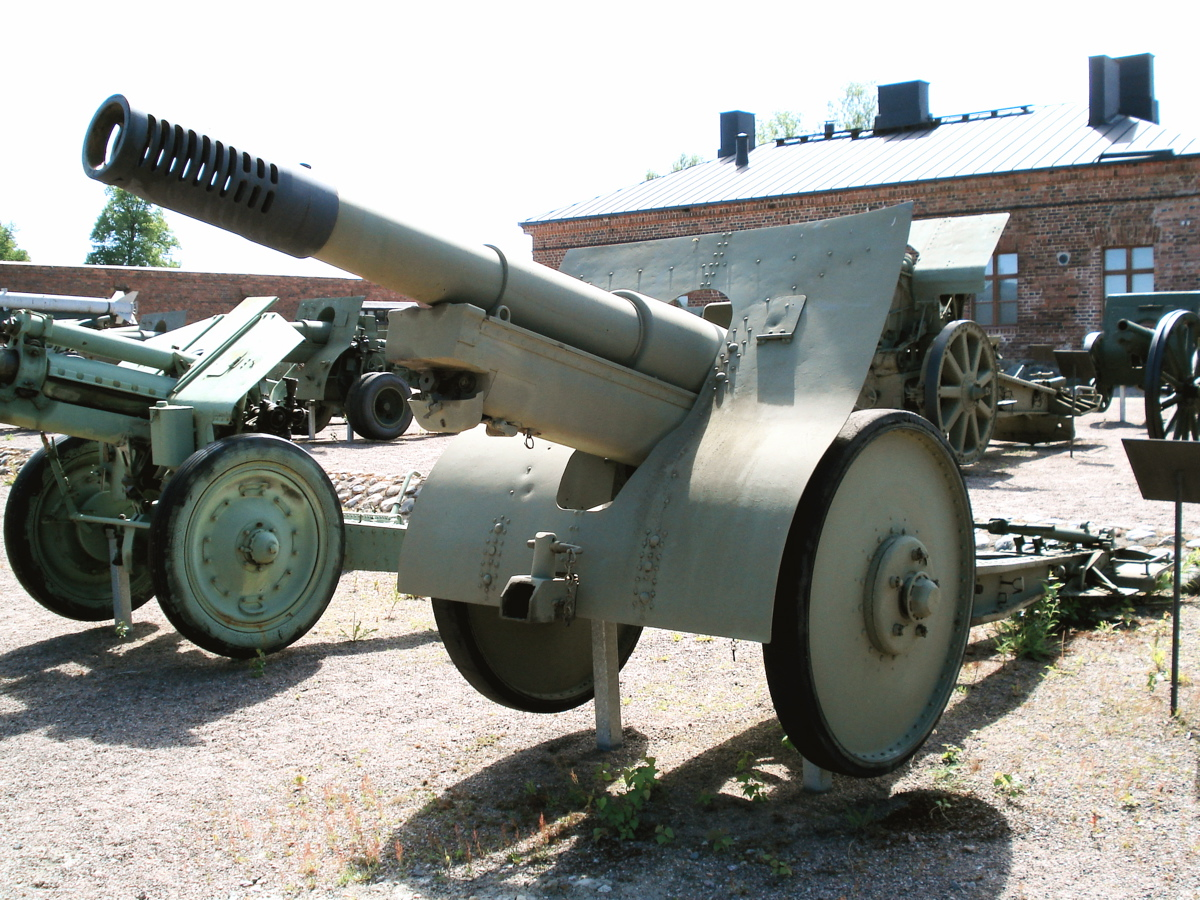
- Soviet 152-mm gun M1910/30 howitzer, displayed at The Artillery Museum of Finland.
- Type: Field gun
- Place of origin: Soviet Union

Production history
- Manufacturer: Krasniy Putilovets, Barrikady, Bolshevik
- No. built: 152

Specifications
- Mass: combat: 2,580 kg (5,688 lb) travel: 3,230 kg (7,121 lb)
- Barrel length: 4.335 m (14 ft 3 in) L/29 (without muzzle brake)
- Caliber: 152.4 mm (6.00 in)
- Breech: Interrupted screw
- Recoil: Hydro-pneumatic
- Carriage: Single trail
- Elevation: -6° / 39°
- Traverse: 4°
- Rate of fire: 2–4 rpm
- Muzzle velocity: 570–660 m/s (1,900–2,200 ft/s) depending on charge/projectile
- Maximum firing range: 9,850 m (10,770 yd)

152 mm gun model 1910/30 was a Soviet field gun, a modernization of World War I era 152 mm siege gun M1910. The gun was briefly used by Red Army in the Eastern Front of World War II.

== Description ==
M1910/30 was powerful long range gun with big (40°) maximum elevation. It was equipped with interrupted screw breechblock and recoil system consisting of hydraulic buffer and hydro-pneumatic recuperator. The carriage was of single trail type and had metal wheels with solid tires. The crew was protected by 7 mm shield.

In transportation, the barrel was removed and transported separately. It took some 10–15 minutes to set the gun up for combat and up to 23 minutes to make it ready for transportation.

== Development and production history ==
The gun resulted from a modernization of the 152-mm siege gun M1910, initially developed by Schneider. The upgrading project was prepared by the design bureau of the Main Artillery Directorate, its main purpose was to increase range. The changes included:

- Lengthened chamber
- Mounting of muzzle brake
- Reduced (from 1,000 mm to 950 mm) recoil distance
- The trail was lengthened (to 2 m)
- Trunnion rings were moved 50 mm forward

In 1930 the modernized gun was adopted as 152-mm gun model 1910/30 (Russian: 152-мм пушка образца 1910/30 годов).

The production began in 1930 at Krasniy Putilovets plant. Later Barrikady and Bolshevik plants joined the production effort. In addition to newly built pieces, all existing M1910 guns were converted to the new standard; the conversion was finished by 1 November 1936.

Since the upgrade of 1930 didn't address a problem of limited mobility, in 1934 additional modernization was performed, resulting in 152-mm gun M1910/34. In 1935 the production of M1910/30 was stopped.

== Organization and service ==
According to Red Army organization, 152-mm guns were employed by corps artillery and by the Reserve of the Main Command, typically instead of 152-mm gun-howitzer M1937 (ML-20). Heavy gun regiments of Reserve of the Main Command had 24 pieces each.

At the outbreak of Operation Barbarossa (Nazi Germany's invasion of the Soviet Union) in June 1941, the Red Army possessed some 120–150 M1910/30s. They undoubtfully saw combat in the war, though due to their limited number the details of their service are unknown.

One piece was captured by the Finnish Army. That gun is currently on display in Hämeenlinna The Artillery Museum of Finland. The Germans assigned the M1910/30 the designation 15.2cm K 438(r).

== Summary ==
The M1910/30 was a result of limited modernization of World War I era weapon, which didn't address its insufficient mobility (due to lack of suspension and separate transportation of barrel) and limited traverse.

On the other hand, the Red Army liked the ballistic characteristics of the gun. Subsequent modernizations, which concentrated mostly on the gun carriage, resulted in improved M1910/34 and eventually in the famous ML-20.

== Ammunition ==
=== Ammunition table ===
Model (en)	Model (ru)	Type		Weight, shell	Weight, HE-filler	Muzzle velocity	Range	Note
Armor-piercing shells
mod. M1915/28	обр. 1915/28 гг.	SAPHE	nav.	51.07 kg (112.6 lb)	3.20 kg (7.055 lb)	573 m/s (1,880 ft/s)	5,000 m (3.1 mi)	
BR-540	БР-540	APHE		48.80 kg (107.6 lb)	0.66 kg (1.455 lb)	600 m/s (2,000 ft/s)	4,000 m (2.5 mi)	
BR-540B	БР-540Б	APHE-BC	–	46.50 kg (102.5 lb)	0.48 kg (1.058 lb)	600 m/s (2,000 ft/s)	4,000 m (2.5 mi)	BR-540 with ballistic cap, late 1944
BP-540	БП-540	HEAT	–	27.44 kg (60.49 lb)	?	680 m/s (2,200 ft/s)	3,000 m (1.9 mi)	
Anti-concrete shells
G-530	Г-530	AC	how.	40.00 kg (88.18 lb)	5.10 kg (11.24 lb)	665 m/s (2,180 ft/s)	15,600 m (9.7 mi)	
G-530Sh	Г-530Ш	AC-F	how.	40.00 kg (88.18 lb)	4.89 kg (10.78 lb)	665 m/s (2,180 ft/s)	15,600 m (9.7 mi)	
G-545	Г-545	AC	cnn.	56.00 kg (123.5 lb)	4.20 kg (9.259 lb)	?	?	
High-explosive fragmentation shells
OF-530	ОФ-530	HEF (ST)	how.	40.00 kg (88.18 lb)	5.47 kg (12.06 lb) min. 5.86 kg (12.92 lb) max.	?	?	
OF-530A	ОФ-530А	HEF (CS)	how.	40.00 kg (88.18 lb)	5.66 kg (12.48 lb)	?	?	
OF-540	ОФ-540	HEF (ST)	cnn.	43.60 kg (96.12 lb)	5.90 kg (13.01 lb) min. 6.25 kg (13.78 lb) max.	650 m/s (2,100 ft/s)	16,800 m (10.4 mi)	
OF-540Zh	ОФ-540Ж	HEF (ST)	cnn.	43.60 kg (96.12 lb)	5.90 kg (13.01 lb) min. 6.25 kg (13.78 lb) max.	?	?	
High-explosive shells
F-521	Ф-521	HE	how.	41.70 kg (91.93 lb)	7.70 kg (16.98 lb)	?	?	152 mm mortar M1931 (NM) shell
F-531	Ф-531	HE (ST)	how.	44.91 kg (99.01 lb)	5.70 kg (12.57 lb)	?	?	152 mm Vickers howitzer shell
F-533	Ф-533	HE	how.	40.41 kg (89.09 lb)	8.00 kg (17.64 lb)	?	?	
F-533K	Ф-533К	HE	how.	40.68 kg (89.68 lb)	7.30 kg (16.09 lb)	?	?	
F-533N	Ф-533Н	HE	how.	41.00 kg (90.39 lb)	7.30 kg (16.09 lb)	?	?	
F-533U	Ф-533У	HE	how.	40.80 kg (89.95 lb)	8.80 kg (19.40 lb)	?	?	
F-534F	Ф-534Ф	HE (CS)	how.	41.10 kg (90.61 lb)	3.90 kg (8.598 lb)	?	?	
F-542	Ф-542	HE (OP)	cnn.	38.10 kg (84.00 lb)	5.86 kg (12.92 lb)	660 m/s (2,200 ft/s)	13,800 m (8.6 mi)	
F-542Sh	Ф-542Ш	HE (RP)	cnn.	40.60 kg (89.51 lb)	6.06 kg (13.36 lb)	650 m/s (2,100 ft/s)	12,800 m (8.0 mi)	
F-542G	Ф-542Г	HE (OP)	cnn.	38.52 kg (84.92 lb)	5.83 kg (12.85 lb)	?	?	
F-542ShG	Ф-542ШГ	HE (RP)	cnn.	41.00 kg (90.39 lb)	5.93 kg (13.07 lb)	?	?	
F-542U	Ф-542У	HE (OP)	cnn.	38.36 kg (84.57 lb)	5.77 kg (12.72 lb)	?	?	
F-542ShU	Ф-542ШУ	HE (RP)	cnn.	40.86 kg (90.08 lb)	5.96 kg (13.14 lb)	?	?	
Shrapnel shells
Sh-501	Ш-501	shrapnel	–	41.16 kg (90.74 lb) min. 41.83 kg (92.22 lb) max.	0.50 kg (1.102 lb)	?	?	680–690 shots, 45 sec fuze
Sh-501T	Ш-501Т	shrapnel	–	41.16 kg (90.74 lb)	0.50 kg (1.102 lb)	?	?	680–690 shots, suffix: Т-6 fuze
Illumination shells
S 1	С 1	star shell	–	40.20 kg (88.63 lb)	?	?	?	illumination, 40 sec
Chemical shells
HS-530	ХС-530	C	how.	38.80 kg (85.54 lb)	?	?	?	
HN-530	ХН-530	C	how.	39.10 kg (86.20 lb)	?	?	?	
OH-540	ОХ-540	HE-C	cnn.	?	?	?	?	
ZHZ	ЗХЗ	C		?	?	?	?	
Main source:

=== Ammunition abbreviations ===
English abbreviations

- AC – anti-concrete
- AC-F – anti-concrete fragmentation
- APHE – armour-piercing high-explosive
- APHE-BC – armour-piercing high-explosive ballistic-capped
- cnn. – cannon shell
- (CS) – cast steel shell
- how. – howitzer shell
- HE – high-explosive
- HE-C – high-explosive chemical
- HEF – high-explosive fragmentation
- HEAT – high-explosive anti-tank
- max. – maximum
- min. – minimum
- nav. – naval shell
- (OP) – ogive point shell (остроголовая граната)
- (RP) – round point shell (тупоголовая граната)
- SAPHE – semi armour-piercing high-explosive
- (ST) – steel shell

Russian abbreviations

- БР – prefix: бронебойные (armour-piercing)
- БП – prefix: бронебойный противотанковый (armour-piercing anti-tank)
- Г – prefix: гаубичный (howitzer) or граната (shell)
- Ж suffix: – железокерамическим пояском (cermet driving band)
- ЗХЗ – prefix: зона химического заражения (zone of chemical contamination)
- обр. – о́браз (mod)
- ОФ – prefix: осколочно фугасный (fragmentation high-explosive)
- ОХ – prefix: осколочно химический (fragmentation chemical)
- С – prefix: световой (luminous)
- Ф – prefix: фугасный (high-explosive) – suffix: французский (French)
- ХН – prefix: химический нестойкими (chemical unstable)
- ХС – prefix: химический стойкими (chemical persistent)
- Ш – prefix: шрапнель (shrapnel shell) – suffix: шрапнель (shrapnel)

=== Armour penetration table ===
Distance	60° impact angle	90° impact angle
APHE shell BR-540
0,500 m (0.31 mi)	105 mm (4.1 in)	125 mm (4.9 in)
1,000 m (0.62 mi)	95 mm (3.7 in)	115 mm (4.5 in)
1,500 m (0.93 mi)	85 mm (3.3 in)	105 mm (4.1 in)
2,000 m (1.2 mi)	75 mm (3.0 in)	90 mm (3.5 in)
APHE-BC shell BR-540B
0,500 m (0.31 mi)	105 mm (4.1 in)	130 mm (5.1 in)
1,000 m (0.62 mi)	100 mm (3.9 in)	120 mm (4.7 in)
1,500 m (0.93 mi)	95 mm (3.7 in)	115 mm (4.5 in)
2,000 m (1.2 mi)	85 mm (3.3 in)	105 mm (4.1 in)
SAPHE naval shell mod. M1915/28
0,100 m (0.062 mi)	110 mm (4.3 in)	136 mm (5.4 in)
0,500 m (0.31 mi)	104 mm (4.1 in)	128 mm (5.0 in)
1,000 m (0.62 mi)	97 mm (3.8 in)	119 mm (4.7 in)
1,500 m (0.93 mi)	91 mm (3.6 in)	111 mm (4.4 in)
2,000 m (1.2 mi)	95 mm (3.7 in)	105 mm (4.1 in)
This data was obtained by Soviet methodics of armour penetration measurement (penetration probability equals 75%). It is not directly comparable with western data of similar type. Main source:
