= 152 mm howitzer M1910/37 =

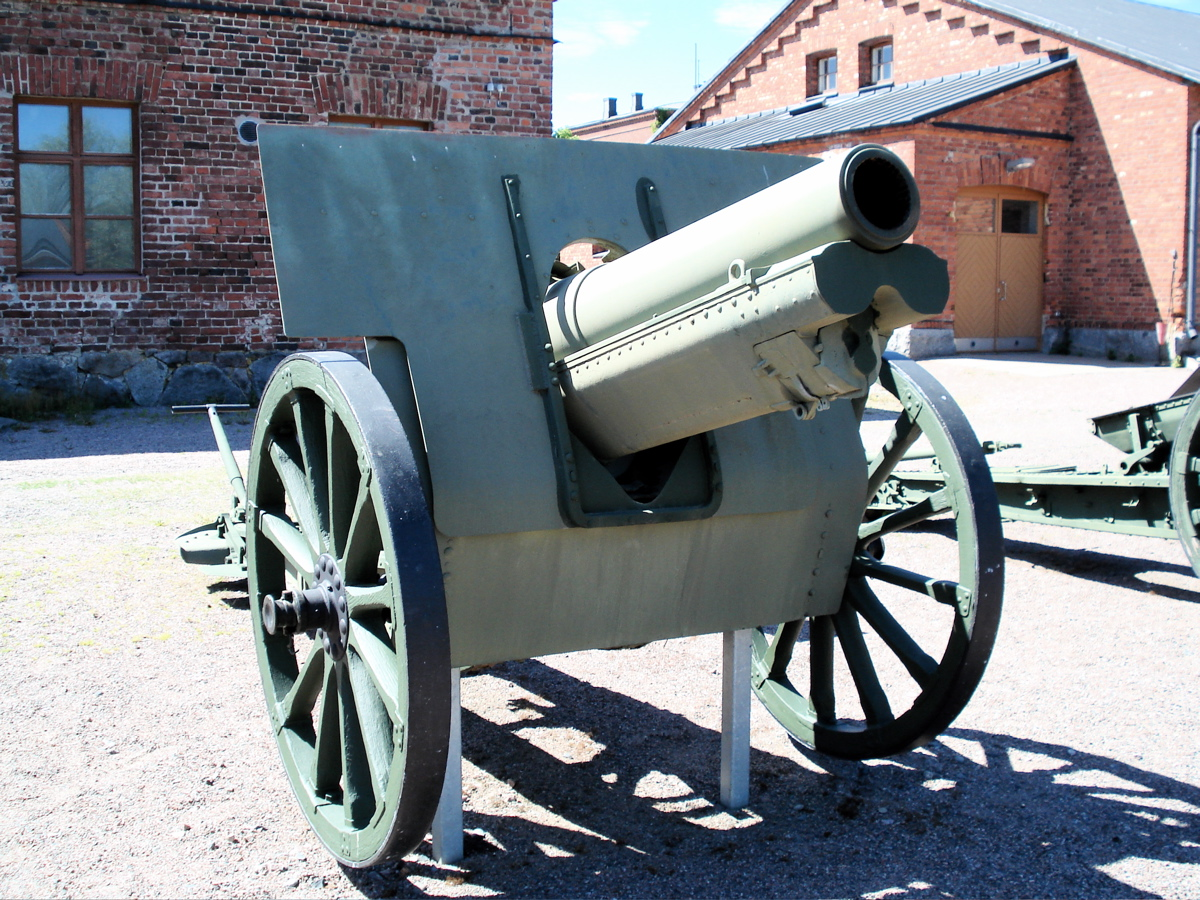
- An identical looking 152 mm howitzer M1910 displayed in Hämeenlinna Artillery Museum
- Type: howitzer
- Place of origin: USSR

Production history
- No. built: about 99

Specifications
- Mass: combat: 2,725 kg (6,007 lb) travel: 3,050 kg (6,724 lb)
- Barrel length: 1.83 m (6 ft) L/12
- Height: 1.91 m (6 ft 3 in)
- Crew: 8
- Caliber: 152.4 mm (6 in)
- Breech: Interrupted screw
- Recoil: Hydro-pneumatic
- Carriage: Box trail
- Elevation: 0° to 41°
- Traverse: 6°
- Rate of fire: 6 rounds per minute
- Effective firing range: 8,000 m (8,750 yd)

152 mm howitzer M1910/37 (Russian: 152-мм гаубица обр. 1910/37 гг.) was a limited production Soviet 152.4 mm (6 inch) howitzer, a modernization of the 152 mm howitzer M1910, initially designed by Schneider. The gun was employed by Red Army in World War II.

== Development and production history ==
The gun resulted from a modernization of the 152 mm howitzer M1910. The M1910 was initially designed by Schneider. Putilov Plant and Perm Plant delivered 348 pieces in 1911-27. By 1936, the RKKA possessed 101 M1910s, including 5 practice pieces.

Work on modernizing the gun started in 1936. Because of small number of M1910s in service, extensive upgrade was not considered worthwhile. The gun was rechambered for larger cartridge, same as used by the 152 mm howitzer M1909/30; upgraded barrels received a mark "lengthened chamber". Some pieces also had their wooden wheels replaced by steel ones with rubber tires, resulting in much higher transportation speed of 18 km/h. The modernized weapon was officially adopted as 152 mm howitzer model 1910/37.

By 1941, all M1910 howitzers were upgraded. There was no production of new pieces.

The design of M1910/37 was typical for World War I era howitzer. The gun had short (12 calibers) barrel with eccentric interrupted screw breechblock; hydraulic recoil buffer and pneumatic recuperator were both mounted under the barrel. The carriage was of single trail type with limited traverse and, typically, unsprung wooden wheels (some pieces received metal wheels with solid rubber tires). The gun was typically towed by a horse team (eight horses) by means of a limber. For each gun three horse-drawn ammunition boxes were issued; each box held 22 projectiles and 24 propellant charges.

== Organization and employment ==
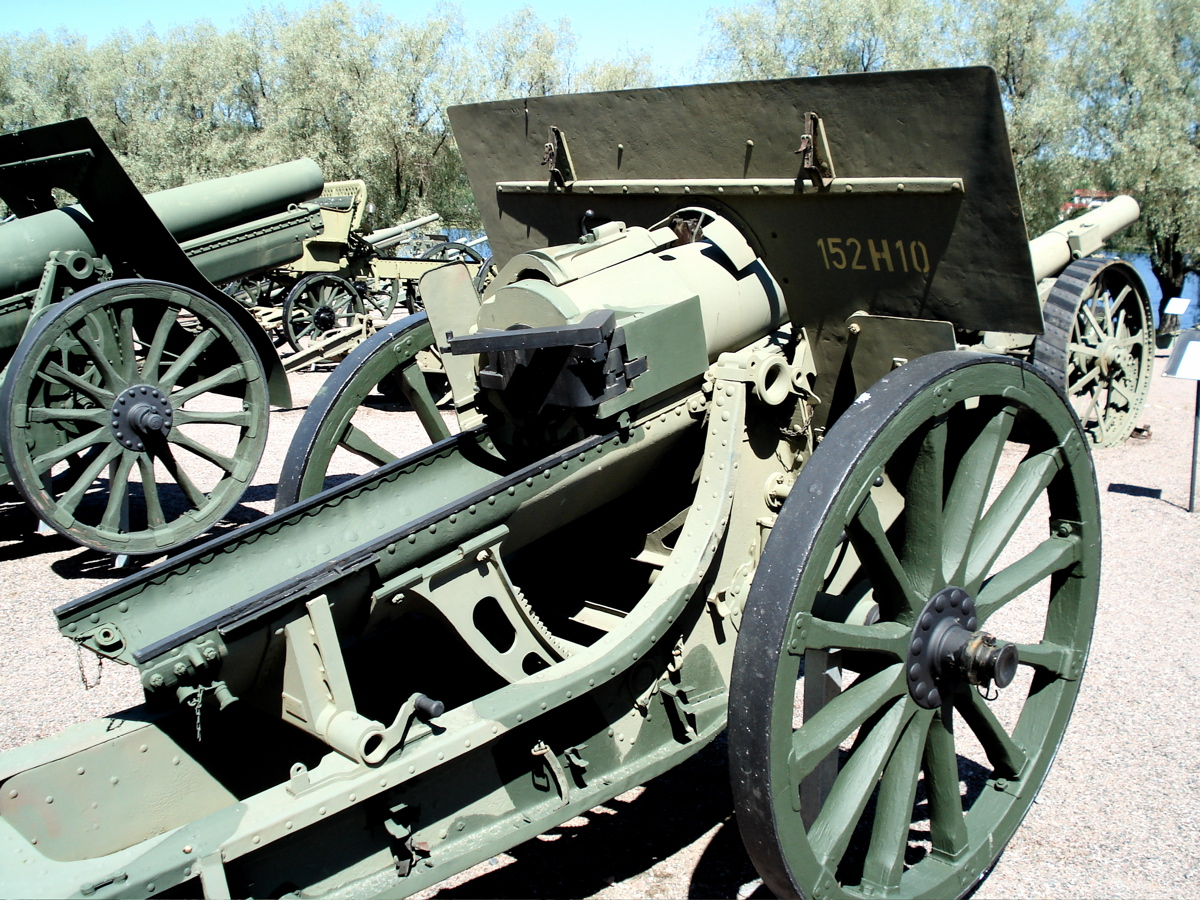
An identically looking 152 mm howitzer M1910.

Under the organization of 1939, each rifle division had a howitzer regiment with a 152 mm howitzers battalion (12 pieces). In July 1941 these regiment were cancelled. Same fate befell 152 mm howitzers battalions of motorized and armored divisions.

Corps artillery units didn't employ 152 mm howitzers early in the war (they did use howitzer-guns ML-20); but from late 1943 the recreated corps artillery included a regiment consisted of five batteries (totaling 20 pieces), equipped, along with other types, with 152 mm howitzers. By 1 June 1944, there were 192 such pieces in corps artillery.

Reserve of the Main Command included howitzer regiments (48 pieces) and heavy howitzer brigades (32 pieces), sometimes organized into artillery divisions.

By the outbreak of German-Soviet War older 152 mm howitzers were being replaced by the newer M-10. However the M-10 production rate was slow, so by June 1941 the M1910/37 was still in service and was employed by the RKKA in the German-Soviet War. However, no details of its service are available.

== Summary ==
The M1910/37 was a relatively minor upgrade of a World War I-era howitzer, which did not address the main flaws of the latter, namely:

- Limited towing speed due to unsprung wheels
- Limited elevation and very small traverse

A short barrel meant short range, less than that of its main adversaries, such as the German 15 cm sFH 18 (8.8 km vs 13.3 km). Low muzzle velocity and small traverse also made the gun helpless against enemy armor.

On the other side, the M1910/37 was rugged, reliable and relatively light.

== Ammunition ==
When set to fragmentation action, the OF-530 produced fragments which covered an area 70 m wide and 30 m deep. When set to HE action, the exploding shell produced a crater about 3.5 m in diameter and about 1.2 m deep.

Available ammunition
Type	Model	Weight	HE weight	Muzzle velocity	Range
Anti-concrete shells
Anti-concrete shell	G-530 / G-530Sh	40.0 kg (88 lb)	5.1 kg (11 lb)
High explosive and fragmentation shells
HE-Fragmentation, steel	OF-530	40.0 kg (88 lb)	5.47–6.86 kg (12–15 lb)	344 m/s (1,130 ft/s)	8.8 km (5.5 mi)
HE-Fragmentation, steely iron	OF-530A	40.0 kg (88 lb)	5.66 kg (12 lb)
HE, old	F-533	40.41 kg (89 lb)	8.0 kg (18 lb)	322 m/s (1,060 ft/s)	7.3 km (4.5 mi)
HE, old	F-533K	40.68 kg (90 lb)	7.3 kg (16 lb)	322 m/s (1,060 ft/s)	7.3 km (4.5 mi)
HE, old	F-533N	41.0 kg (90 lb)	7.3 kg (16 lb)	322 m/s (1,060 ft/s)	7.3 km (4.5 mi)
HE, old	F-533U	40.8 kg (90 lb)	8.8 kg (19 lb)	322 m/s (1,060 ft/s)	7.3 km (4.5 mi)
HE, steely iron, old French	F-534F	41.1 kg (91 lb)	3.9 kg (9 lb)	322 m/s (1,060 ft/s)	7.3 km (4.5 mi)
HE for 152-mm mortar model 1931	F-521	41.7 kg (92 lb)	7.7 kg (17 lb)
HE, British, for Vickers 152-mm howitzer	F-531	44.91 kg (99 lb)	5.7 kg (13 lb)
Shrapnel shells
Shrapnel with 45 sec. tube	Sh-501	41.16–41.83 kg (91–92 lb)	0.5 (680–690 bullets)
Shrapnel with Т-6 tube	Sh-501T	41.16 kg (91 lb)	0.5 (680–690 bullets)
Illumination shells
Illumination, 40 sec.	S 1	40.2 kg (89 lb)
Chemical shells
Fragmentation-chemical gun shell	OH-530	38.8 kg (86 lb)		340 m/s (1,100 ft/s)	8.8 km (5.5 mi)
Chemical howitzer shell	HN-530	39.1 kg (86 lb)		344 m/s (1,130 ft/s)	8.8 km (5.5 mi)

== Notes ==
1 - HE/Frag shell OF-530, 2 - fragmentation shell O-530, 3 - HEAC (anti-concrete) shell G-530.
