= 15 cm Kanone 18 =

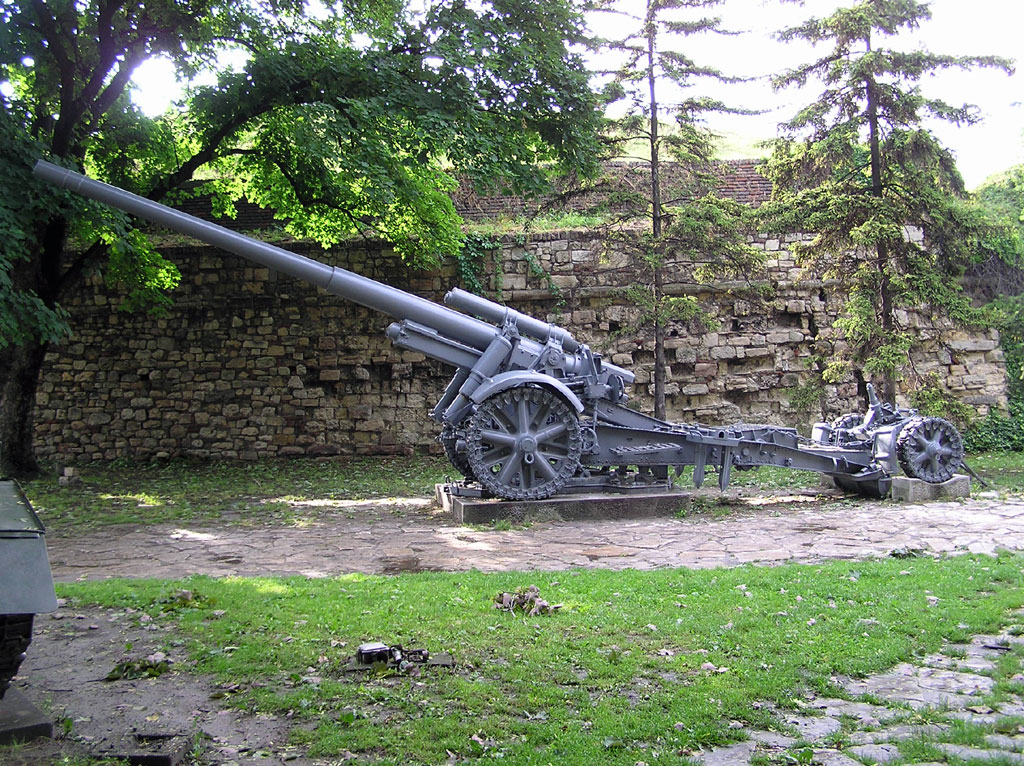
- 15 cm Kanone 18 at Belgrade Military Museum, Serbia
- Type: Heavy gun
- Place of origin: Germany

Service history
- Used by: Nazi Germany
- Wars: World War II

Production history
- Designer: Rheinmetall
- Designed: 1933–1938
- Manufacturer: Rheinmetall
- Produced: 1940–1943
- No. built: 101

Specifications
- Mass: Combat: 12,460 kg (27,469 lbs); Travel: 18,600 kg (41,006 lbs)
- Length: 8.6 m (28 ft 3 in)
- Barrel length: 8.195 m (26 ft 11 in) L/55
- Shell: 149 x 815 mm R
- Shell weight: 43 kg (95 lb)
- Caliber: 149.1 mm (5.87 in)
- Breech: horizontal block
- Carriage: box trail
- Elevation: -2° to +45°
- Traverse: 10° on wheels 360° on platform
- Muzzle velocity: 865 m/s (2,838 ft/s)
- Maximum firing range: 24,500 m (26,793 yds)

The 15 cm Kanone 18 (15 cm K 18) was a German heavy gun used in the Second World War.

== Design and history ==
In 1933 Rheinmetall began development of a new artillery piece to fulfill a German Army requirement for a replacement of the aged 15 cm Kanone 16, with the first production units received in 1938. There was not much of an improvement over the older gun as it weighed two tons more than the K 16 but only had 2,290 metres (2,500 yd) more range. The army was happy with the range, but not with the carriage. There was a special transport carriage for the gun when traveling long distances and putting it on its turntable for firing took more time to assemble. The rate of fire was at best two rounds per minute.

== Ammunition ==
The K18 used different types of ammunition based on carriers, but most probably would have used High Explosive or Armour Piercing shells. Crews could use different amounts of charges to effect trajectory and range, similar to other heavy guns of the time.

== Use ==
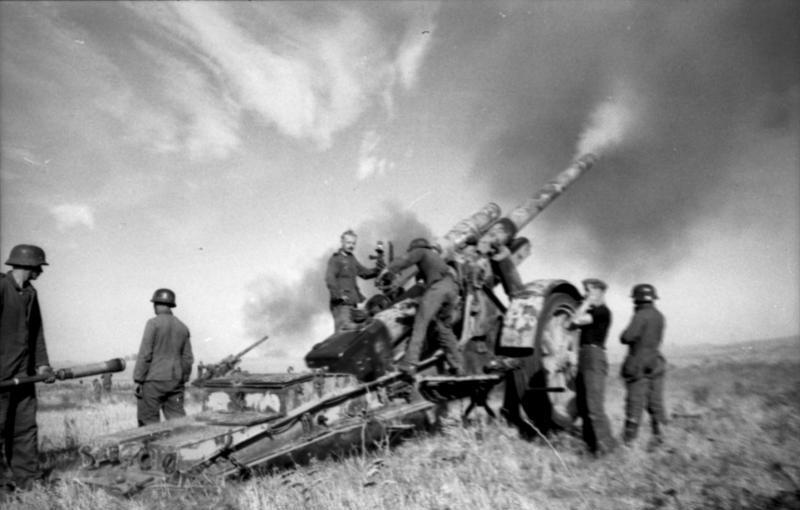
K 18 firing in Russia

A total of 101 examples were built by Rheinmetall between 1938 and 1943. It was not popular in service as its barrel length and weight were very large proportionally for its shell damage, and its performance was not much better than the established K16 design. The Heer also fielded many larger caliber guns which were more effective at engaging fortifications. This caused its production to be terminated in August 1943. Many were used in static coastal installations, removing all mobility drawbacks and resulting in successful service over the K16.

== See also ==
- 152 mm gun M1935 (Br-2) – Soviet World War II equivalent
- 155 mm Long Tom – American World War II equivalent
