= 152 mm siege gun M1910 =

152mm Siege Gun M1910
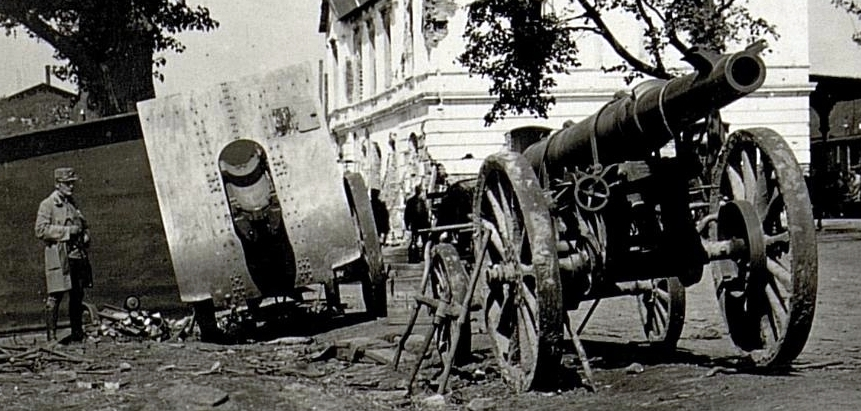
- A M1910 captured by the Austrians in Zborów.
- Type: Field Gun
- Place of origin: Russian Empire

Service history
- In service: 1915–30
- Used by: Russian Empire; Soviet Union
- Wars: World War I, Russian Civil War

Production history
- Designer: Schneider et Cie
- Manufacturer: Putilov
- Produced: 1915–28
- No. built: 100

Specifications
- Mass: 6,777 kilograms (14,941 lb) (emplaced)
- Barrel length: 4.27 metres (14.0 ft) (L/28)
- Shell weight: 41 kilograms (90 lb) (HE); 38.6 kilograms (85 lb) (Shrapnel)
- Caliber: 152.4 millimetres (6.00 in)
- Breech: Interrupted screw with de Bange obturation
- Recoil: Hydro-pneumatic
- Carriage: Box trail
- Elevation: -7° to +37°
- Traverse: 4.3°
- Rate of fire: 2 rpm
- Muzzle velocity: 650 metres per second (2,100 ft/s)
- Maximum firing range: 14,870 metres (16,260 yd)

The 152 mm siege gun model 1910 (Russian: 152-мм осадная пушка образца 1910 года) was a heavy gun used by the Russian Army in World War I. The gun was designed by the French arms manufacturer Schneider and the first prototype was evaluated in Russia in 1909-10. A total of 73 guns were ordered from the Putilov Plant in 1912. However, only 51 guns were delivered by the end of the Civil War. A further 49 guns were ordered by the Red Army Artillery Administration in 1926 and 1928. All usable guns were upgraded to 152 mm gun M1910/30 in the early 1930s.

== Selection ==
In 1906 the Russian War Department held a competition among Russian and foreign gun makers to find a 152mm siege gun to replace the obsolete 19th century designs in service. Only two manufacturers' designs were chosen to progress to field trials - those of Schneider and Krupp. The Schneider design was chosen after trials in 1909-10. The trials were a sham since the Schneider gun was preferred even before the trials were conducted. A licence agreement had been signed in 1907 between Schneider and Putilov for the production of a number of Schneider designs including the 152mm gun in anticipation of the final decision. The gun was adopted as the "152 mm Siege Gun Model 1910" (Russian: 152-мм осадная пушка образца 1910 года).

== Production ==
In June 1912 the War Department ordered 56 guns from Putilov. A further 17 guns were ordered by the Marine Office in 1914, but these would have required extensive modifications since they were intended as coastal defence/railway guns. Putilov decided to complete the order for the Russian Army first then build the extra 17 guns. It was intended that production would be completed by July 1918. The Marine Office order was never completed since the revolution intervened in April 1917. Production proceeded fairly slowly. By 1 Jan 1917 36 guns had been completed, by 1 Dec 1917 43 guns. During the revolution and Civil War production was very slow, only 3 guns were completed in 1919, for a total production of 51 guns. In 1926 the Red Army Artillery Administration ordered 26 152mm guns from "Red Putilovets" the former Putilov factory. In 1928 a further 23 guns were ordered bringing the Red Army inventory of 152 mm guns to 67 in 1930.

== Description ==
In common with the Schneider designs the Putilov guns had hydraulic recoil absorption and pneumatic recuperation. The gun had variable recoil, at less than 12° elevation the recoil length was 1800 1,800 millimetres (71 in), at greater than 16° elevation the recoil length was reduced to 1,000 millimetres (39 in). The 152mm guns barrels were designed to be detached from the carriage for transport and guide plates were added to muzzle to help with removal/installation of the barrel. The barrel transport cart and the gun carriage required teams of 10 horses to move them. Later in the war the Russian army started using tractors, often imported American Allis-Chamers types, to move these guns as a train. It took a trained crew 20 – 30 minutes to ready the gun for firing from the transport configuration. The gun's wheels could be fitted with hinged flat plates, similar to the French "ceinture de roues", to permit towing on soft ground. The Russian projectiles were a little lighter than the French equivalent weighing 38.6 kg for the shrapnel projectile and 41 kg for the high explosive projectile.

== Service ==
The 152 mm M10 gun was employed as a heavy field gun by the Russian Army rather than its intended use as a component of a slow-moving heavy artillery siege train. The use of heavy field guns for counter-battery fire and interdiction of enemy supplies in World War 1, rather than the reduction of static fortifications, required a more flexible command structure than that offered by classical siege artillery. The first 8 guns were sent to the front in the spring of 1915 and were returned to the Putilov factory in October for repairs. The first guns from Putilov had weak carriages which deformed and cracked around the barrel support areas. In part, this may have been due to poor quality Russian steel since the equivalent Schneider guns did not suffer from this problem. The carriages had to be redesigned and the early production guns remade to remedy this problem. It was also found that the barrels would wear very rapidly when fired continuously at high charges. An operational solution to this problem was to fire one in three projectiles with reduced charge to limit the muzzle velocity to 349 metres per second (1,150 ft/s)-469 metres per second (1,540 ft/s) with corresponding maximum range reduced to 7,680 metres (8,400 yd)-9,850 metres (10,770 yd) compared to the 14,870 metres (16,260 yd) at 650 metres per second (2,100 ft/s) at full charge. The 152mm M10 suffered high attrition rates during World War 1 and the Russian Civil War with only 26 152mm guns remaining at the end of Civil War, 17 with army units and 9 damaged guns in storage.

== Conversion ==
The remaining usable 152 mm M10 guns were converted to the modernised 152 mm gun M1910/30 gun in the early 1930s.
