= List of artillery by name =

Artillery has been a primary weapon of war since before the Napoleonic Era. Several countries have developed and built artillery systems, while artillery itself has been continually improved and redesigned to meet the evolving needs of the battlefield. This has led to a plethora of different types and designs which have played a role in the history of warfare and continue to be a significant factor in modern combat.

The following list of artillery covers indirect fire guns, heavy mortars, and other large projectile weapons used by artillery units. Small arms, infantry support weapons, infantry mortars, direct-fire guns, and anti-aircraft guns are not included. This list is ordered by name or designation in alpha-numeric order.

For other categorized lists, see list of artillery by country and list of artillery by type.

== Artillery ==
| Name/Designation | Origin | Description |
|---|---|---|
| 2S4 Tyulpan | Soviet Union | 240 mm SP mortar |
| 2S9 Nona-SVK | Russia | 120 mm SP gun / mortar |
| BL 2.75-inch mountain gun | United Kingdom, India | 70 mm mountain gun |
| 3.7-inch mountain howitzer | United Kingdom | 94 mm mountain gun |
| 4.5-inch Mark 8 naval gun | United Kingdom | 114 mm dual purpose naval gun |
| 4.5-inch gun M1 | United States | 114 mm howitzer |
| 4.7-inch gun M1906 | United States | 120 mm field gun |
| BL 6-inch 26 cwt howitzer | United Kingdom | 152 mm howitzer |
| BL 6-inch 30 cwt howitzer | United Kingdom | 152 mm howitzer |
| 6-inch howitzer M1908 | United States | 152 mm howitzer |
| 6-inch siege gun M1877 | Russian Empire | 152 mm siege gun |
| 6-inch siege gun M1904 | Russian Empire | 152 mm siege gun |
| 7 cm Gebirgsgeschütz M 99 | Austria-Hungary | 70 mm mountain gun |
| 7.5 cm FK 7M85 | Nazi Germany | 75 mm field gun |
| 7.5 cm FK 16 nA | Nazi Germany | 75 mm field gun |
| 7.5 cm FK 18 | Nazi Germany | 75 mm field gun |
| 7.5 cm FK 38 | Nazi Germany | 75 mm field gun |
| 7.5 cm Gebirgsgeschütz 36 | Nazi Germany | 75 mm mountain gun |
| 7.5 cm Gebirgskanone Model 1911 | German Empire | 75 mm mountain gun |
| 7.5 cm Infantriegeschutz 37 | Nazi Germany | 75 mm infantry gun |
| 7.5 cm leichte Gebirgsinfantriegeschutz 18 | Nazi Germany | 75 mm mountain gun |
| 7.5 cm leichte Infantriegeschutz 18 | Nazi Germany | 75 mm infantry gun |
| 7.7 cm FK 16 | German Empire | 77 mm field gun |
| 7.7 cm FK 96 | German Empire | 77 mm field gun |
| 7.7 cm FK 96 n.A. | German Empire | 77 mm field gun |
| 8 cm FK M. 5 | Austria-Hungary | 76.5 mm field gun |
| 8 cm FK M. 17 | Austria-Hungary | 76.5 mm field gun |
| 8 cm kanon vz. 30 | Czechoslovakia | 76.5 mm field gun |
| 9.45-inch heavy mortar "Flying Pig" | United Kingdom | British production of French Mortier de 240 mm |
| 10 cm Feldhaubitze M. 14 | Austria-Hungary | 100 mm howitzer |
| 10 cm Gebirgshaubitze M 99 | Austria-Hungary | 100 mm mountain gun |
| 10 cm Gebirgshaubitze M 8 | Austria-Hungary | 100 mm mountain gun |
| 10 cm houfnice vz. 30 | Czechoslovakia | 100 mm howitzer |
| 10.4 cm Feldkanone M. 15 | Austria-Hungary | 104 mm field gun |
| 10 cm K 04 | German Empire | 105 mm field gun |
| 10 cm K 14 | German Empire | 105 mm field gun |
| 10 cm K 17 | German Empire | 105 mm field gun |
| 10.5 cm Feldhaubitze 98/09 | German Empire | 105 mm howitzer |
| 10.5 cm hruby kanon vz. 35 | Czechoslovakia | 105 mm howitzer |
| 10.5 cm leFH 16 | German Empire | 105 mm howitzer |
| 10.5 cm leFH 18 | Nazi Germany | 105 mm howitzer |
| 10.5 cm leFH 18M | Nazi Germany | 105 mm howitzer |
| 10.5 cm leFH 18/40 | Nazi Germany | 105 mm howitzer |
| 10.5 cm sK 18 | Nazi Germany | 105 mm field gun |
| 12 cm felthaubits/m32 | Norway | 120 mm howitzer |
| 14 cm Minenwerfer M 15 | Austria-Hungary | 140 mm mortar |
| 15 cm Autokanone M. 15/16 | Austria-Hungary | 152 mm field gun |
| 15 cm hruba houfnice vz. 25 | Czechoslovakia | 149 mm howitzer |
| 15 cm Kanone 18 | Nazi Germany | 149 mm field gun |
| 15 cm Kanone 39 | Nazi Germany | 149 mm field gun |
| 15 cm Luftminenwerfer M 15 M. E. | German Empire | 149 mm mortar |
| 15 cm schwere Feldhaubitze M 14 | Austria-Hungary | 149 mm howitzer |
| 15 cm schwere Feldhaubitze M. 15 | Austria-Hungary | 149 mm howitzer |
| 15 cm sFH 02 | German Empire | 149 mm howitzer |
| 15 cm sFH 13 | German Empire | 149 mm howitzer |
| 15 cm sFH 18 | Nazi Germany | 149 mm howitzer |
| 15 cm sFH 36 | Nazi Germany | 149 mm howitzer |
| 15 cm sIG 33 | Nazi Germany | 149 mm infantry gun |
| 15 cm sIG 33 auf Fahrgestell Panzerkampfwagen II | Nazi Germany | 149 mm SP infantry gun |
| 17 cm mittlerer Minenwerfer | German Empire | 173 mm mortar |
| 17 cm Kanone 18 in Mörserlafette | Nazi Germany | 173 mm field gun |
| 20 cm Luftminenwerfer M 16 | Austria-Hungary | 200 mm mortar |
| 21 cm GrW 69 | Nazi Germany | 211 mm mortar |
| 21 cm Mörser 10 | German Empire | 211 mm siege mortar |
| 21 cm Mörser 16 | German Empire | 211 mm siege mortar |
| 21 cm Mrs 18 | Nazi Germany | 211 mm siege mortar |
| 22.5 cm Minenwerfer M 15 | Austria-Hungary | 225 mm mortar |
| 24 cm Haubitze 39 | Czechoslovakia | 240 mm siege howitzer |
| 24 cm Kanone 3 | Nazi Germany | 238 mm field gun |
| 24 cm Kanone M. 16 | Austria-Hungary | 240 mm field gun |
| 24 cm Mörser M 98 | Austria-Hungary | 240 mm siege mortar |
| 25 cm schwere Minenwerfer | German Empire | 250 mm mortar |
| 25 pounder Short Mark 1 | Australia | 88 mm pack howitzer |
| 26 cm Minenwerfer M 17 | Austria-Hungary | 260 mm mortar |
| 38 cm Belagerungshaubitze M 16 | Austria-Hungary | 380 mm siege howitzer |
| 42 cm Gamma Mörser | German Empire | 419 mm siege howitzer |
| 42 line gun M1877 | Russian Empire | 107 mm field gun |
| 75 mm gun M1897 | United States | 75 mm field gun |
| 75 mm gun M1916 | United States | 75 mm field gun |
| 75 mm gun M1917 | United States | 75 mm field gun |
| 75 mm Pack Howitzer M1 / M116 | United States | 75 mm pack gun |
| 75 mm Schneider-Danglis 06/09 | Greece | 75 mm gun |
| 75 mm Type 90 field gun | Japan | 75 mm field gun |
| 76 mm divisional gun M1902 | Russian Empire | 76.2 mm field gun |
| 76 mm divisional gun M1902/30 | Soviet Union | 76.2 mm field gun |
| 76 mm divisional gun M1936 (F-22) | Soviet Union | 76.2 mm field gun |
| 76 mm divisional gun M1939 (USV) | Soviet Union | 76.2 mm field gun |
| 76 mm divisional gun M1942 (ZiS-3) | Soviet Union | 76.2 mm field gun |
| 76 mm gun M1900 | Russian Empire | 76.2 mm field gun |
| 76 mm mountain gun M1938 | Soviet Union | 76.2 mm mountain gun |
| 76 mm regimental gun M1927 | Soviet Union | 76.2 mm gun |
| 76 mm regimental gun M1943 | Soviet Union | 76.2 mm gun |
| 85 mm divisional gun D-44 | Soviet Union | 85 mm field gun |
| 87 mm light field gun M1877 | Russian Empire | 87 mm field gun |
| 107 mm divisional gun M1940 (M-60) | Soviet Union | 107 mm field gun |
| 107 mm gun M1910 | Russian Empire | 107 mm field gun |
| 107 mm gun M1910/30 | Soviet Union | 107 mm field gun |
| 122 mm gun M1931 (A-19) | Soviet Union | 122 mm field gun |
| 122 mm gun M1931/37 (A-19) | Soviet Union | 122 mm field gun |
| 122 mm howitzer 2A18 (D-30) | Soviet Union | 122 mm howitzer |
| 122 mm howitzer M1909 | Russian Empire | 122 mm howitzer |
| 122 mm howitzer M1909/37 | Soviet Union | 122 mm howitzer |
| 122 mm howitzer M1910 | Russian Empire | 122 mm howitzer |
| 122 mm howitzer M1910/30 | Soviet Union | 122 mm howitzer |
| 122 mm howitzer M1938 (M-30) | Soviet Union | 122 mm howitzer |
| 130 mm towed field gun M1954 (M-46) | Soviet Union | 130 mm field gun |
| 152 mm field gun-howitzer M84 NORA-A | Yugoslavia | 152 mm towed howitzer |
| 152 mm gun 2A36 | Russia | 152 mm field gun |
| 152 mm gun M1910/30 | Soviet Union | 152 mm field gun |
| 152 mm gun M1910/34 | Soviet Union | 152 mm field gun |
| 152 mm gun M1935 (Br-2) | Soviet Union | 152 mm field gun |
| 152 mm howitzer 2A65 | Russia | 152 mm howitzer |
| 152 mm howitzer M1909 | Russian Empire | 152 mm howitzer |
| 152 mm howitzer M1909/30 | Soviet Union | 152 mm howitzer |
| 152 mm howitzer M1910 | Russian Empire | 152 mm howitzer |
| 152 mm howitzer M1910/37 | Soviet Union | 152 mm howitzer |
| 152 mm howitzer M1938 (M-10) | Soviet Union | 152 mm howitzer |
| 152 mm howitzer M1943 (D-1) | Soviet Union | 152 mm howitzer |
| 152 mm howitzer-gun M1937 (ML-20) | Soviet Union | 152 mm howitzer |
| 155 mm Long Tom | United States | 155 mm howitzer |
| 152 mm siege gun M1910 | Russian Empire | 152 mm siege gun |
| 152 mm towed gun-howitzer M1955 (D-20) | Soviet Union | 152 mm howitzer |
| 155 GH 52 APU | Finland | 155 mm howitzer |
| 160mm Mortar M1943 | Soviet Union | 160 mm mortar |
| 180 mm gun S-23 | Soviet Union | 180 mm howitzer |
| 203 mm howitzer M1931 (B-4) | Soviet Union | 203 mm howitzer |
| 210 mm gun M1939 (Br-17) | Soviet Union | 210 mm siege gun |
| Dumezil-Batignolles Mortier de 240 mm | France | 240 mm mortar |
| 305 mm howitzer M1915 | Russian Empire | 305 mm siege howitzer |
| 305 mm howitzer M1939 (Br-18) | Soviet Union | 305 mm siege howitzer |
| Al Fao | Iraq | 210 mm SP howitzer |
| AMOS | Finland, Sweden | 120 mm SP twin mortar |
| Armstrong gun | United Kingdom | Developmental gun |
| Basilic | Ottoman Empire/ Wallachia | 750 mm siege gun |
| Big Bertha | German Empire | 419 mm siege howitzer |
| BL 4.5 inch gun | United Kingdom | 113 mm field gun |
| BL 5-inch howitzer | United Kingdom | 127 mm howitzer |
| BL 5.4-inch howitzer | United Kingdom | 137.2 mm howitzer |
| BL 5.5-inch medium gun | United Kingdom | 140 mm field gun |
| BL 6-inch Mk VII naval gun | United Kingdom | 152 mm naval gun |
| BL 6-inch gun Mk XIX | United Kingdom | 152 mm field gun |
| BL 7.2-inch howitzer Mk I – VI | United Kingdom | 183 mm howitzer |
| BL 8-inch howitzer Mk I – V | United Kingdom | 203 mm howitzer |
| BL 8-inch howitzer Mk VI – VIII | United Kingdom | 203 mm howitzer |
| BL 9.2-inch howitzer | United Kingdom | 233 mm siege howitzer |
| BL 10-pounder mountain gun | United Kingdom, India | 70 mm mountain gun |
| BL 12-inch howitzer | United Kingdom | 305 mm siege howitzer |
| BL 15-inch howitzer | United Kingdom | 380 mm siege howitzer |
| BL 60-pounder gun | United Kingdom | 127 mm field gun |
| Bofors 37 mm | Sweden | 37 mm anti-tank gun |
| Bofors 75 mm Model 1934 | Sweden | 75 mm mountain gun |
| Bofors 10.5 cm howitzer Model 1924 | Sweden | 105 mm howitzer |
| Bofors 10.5 cm cannon Model 1927 | Sweden | 105 mm field gun |
| Bofors 10.5 cm kanon m/34 | Sweden | 105 mm field gun |
| Bofors 12 cm M. 14 | Sweden | 120 mm howitzer |
| Sturmpanzer 43 (Brummbär) | Nazi Germany | 149 mm assault gun |
| Cannone da 65/17 modello 13 | Italy | 65 mm towed gun |
| Cannone da 70/15 | Italy | 70 mm towed gun |
| Cannone da 75/27 modello 06 | Italy | 75 mm field gun |
| Cannone da 75/27 modello 11 | Italy | 75 mm gun |
| Cannone da 75/32 modello 37 | Italy | 75 mm field gun |
| Cannone da 149/35 A | Italy | 149 mm field gun |
| Cannone da 149/40 modello 35 | Italy | 149 mm field gun |
| Cannone da 152/45 | Italy | 152 mm field gun |
| Canon Court de 105 M mle 1909 Schneider | France | 105 mm mountain gun |
| Canon Court de 105 M mle 1919 Schneider | France | 105 mm mountain gun |
| Canon Court de 105 M mle 1928 Schneider | France | 105 mm mountain gun |
| Canon de 65 M modele 1906 | France | 65 mm mountain gun |
| Canon de 75 M mle 1919 Schneider | France | 75 mm mountain gun |
| Canon de 75 M mle 1928 | France | 75 mm mountain gun |
| Canon de 75 modèle 1897 | France | 75 mm field gun |
| Canon de 75 modèle 1905 Schneider | France | 75 mm field gun |
| Canon de 75 modèle 1912 Schneider | France | 75 mm field gun |
| Canon de 75 modèle 1914 Schneider | France | 75 mm field gun |
| Canon de 75 modèle 1922 Schneider | France | 75 mm field gun |
| Canon de 75 modele 1934 | Belgium | 75 mm gun |
| Canon de 76 FRC (Fonderie Royale de Canons) | Belgium | 76 mm gun |
| Canon de 85 modèle 1927 Schneider | France | 85 mm field gun |
| Canon de 105 court mle 1934 Schneider | France | 105 mm howitzer |
| Canon de 105 court mle 1935 B | France | 105 mm howitzer |
| Canon de 105 L mle 1936 Schneider | France | 105 mm field gun |
| Canon de 105 mle 1913 Schneider | France | 105 mm field gun |
| Canon de 105 modèle 1925/27 Schneider | France | 105 mm field gun |
| Canon de 105 modèle 1930 Schneider | France | 105 mm field gun |
| Canon de 155 C mle 1917 Schneider | France | 155 mm howitzer |
| Canon de 155 GPF | France | 155 mm field gun |
| Canon de 194 GPF | France | 194 mm field gun |
| Canon de 240 L Mle 1884 | France | 240 mm field gun |
| Canone de 120 L mle 1931 | Belgium | 120 mm field gun |
| Canone de 155 L mle 1924 | Belgium | 155 mm howitzer |
| Cañón 155 mm L 33 Modelo Argentino | Argentina | 155 mm towed howitzer, also known as "CITER 155 mm L33 gun" |
| Cañón 155 mm L 45 CALA 30 | Argentina | 155 mm long range gun/howitzer |
| D-74 howitzer | Soviet Union | 122 mm howitzer |
| Ehrhardt 7.5 cm Model 1901 | German Empire | 75 mm field gun |
| Ehrhardt 7.5 cm Model 1904 | German Empire | 75 mm field gun |
| FH-70 | United Kingdom, Germany, Italy | 155 mm howitzer |
| FH 77 | Sweden | 155 mm howitzer |
| FH-88 | Singapore | 155 mm SP howitzer |
| FH-2000 | Singapore | 155 mm howitzer |
| G5 | South Africa | 155 mm towed howitzer |
| G6 | South Africa | 155 mm SP howitzer |
| G7 | South Africa | 105 mm towed howitzer |
| GC-45 | Canada | 155 mm towed howitzer |
| Grasshopper cannon | United Kingdom | Light mobile gun |
| Indian field gun | India | 105 mm field gun |
| Kongsberg M.27 | Norway | 75 mm gun |
| Krupp 7.5 cm Model 1903 | German Empire | 75 mm field gun |
| Obuzierul Krupp, calibrul 105 mm, model 1912 | Romania | 105 mm howitzer |
| L118 light gun | United Kingdom | 105 mm field gun |
| Leather cannon | Sweden | Experimental lightweight gun |
| LG1 | France | 105 mm towed howitzer |
| Little David | United States | 914 mm mortar |
| Livens Projector | United Kingdom | 203 mm mortar |
| Long Cecil | British Empire | 104 mm howitzer |
| M1 240 mm howitzer | United States | 240 mm howitzer |
| M3 howitzer | United States | 105 mm howitzer |
| M425 | Thailand | 105 mm towed howitzer / self-propelled howitzer |
| M84 NORA-A | Yugoslavia | 152 mm towed howitzer |
| M101 howitzer | United States | 105 mm howitzer |
| M102 howitzer | United States | 105 mm howitzer |
| M109 | United States | 155 mm SP howitzer |
| M114 howitzer | United States | 155 mm howitzer |
| M115 203 mm howitzer | United States | 203 mm howitzer |
| M116 howitzer | United States | 75 mm howitzer |
| M119 howitzer | United States | 105 mm howitzer |
| M198 howitzer | United States | 155 mm howitzer |
| M-240 towed mortar | Soviet Union | 240 mm mortar |
| M777 howitzer | United States | 155 mm howitzer |
| M1902/M1905 field gun | United States | 76.2 mm field gun |
| Mörser Karl | Nazi Germany | 540 or 600 mm siege mortar |
| Mortaio da 210/8 D.S. | Italy | 210 mm siege mortar |
| Mortier 120mm Rayé Tracté Modèle F1 | France | 120 mm towed mortar |
| Mortier de 280 Schneider | France | 280 mm mortar |
| Newton 6-inch mortar | United Kingdom | 152 mm mortar |
| Nora B-52 | Serbia | 152 mm SP howitzer |
| Nuclear cannon | United States | 280 mm nuclear cannon |
| Obice de 75/18 Modello 34, 35 | Italy | 75 mm gun |
| Obice da 105/14 | Italy | 105 mm howitzer |
| Obice da 149/19 modello 37 | Italy | 149 mm howitzer |
| Obice da 210/22 | Italy | 210 mm howitzer |
| Obusier de 155 mm Modèle 50 | France | 155 mm howitzer |
| Ordnance BL 12 pounder 6 cwt | United Kingdom | 76.2 mm field gun |
| Ordnance BL 12 pounder 7 cwt | United Kingdom | 76.2 mm field gun |
| Ordnance BL 15 pounder | United Kingdom | 76.2 mm field gun |
| Ordnance BLC 15 pounder | United Kingdom | 76.2 mm field gun |
| Ordnance QF 12 pounder 8 cwt | United Kingdom | 76.2 mm naval gun |
| Ordnance QF 13 pounder | United Kingdom | 76.2 mm field gun |
| Ordnance QF 15 pounder The Ehrhardt | German Empire | 76.2 mm field gun |
| Ordnance QF 18 pounder | United Kingdom | 83.8 mm field gun |
| Ordnance QF 25 pounder | United Kingdom | 88 mm towed gun-howitzer |
| OTO Melara Mod 56 | Italy | 105 mm pack howitzer |
| Paladin M109 | United States | 155 mm SP howitzer |
| Patria NEMO | Finland | 120 mm SP mortar |
| Paris gun | German Empire | 210 mm siege gun |
| QF 2.95 inch mountain gun | United Kingdom | 75 mm mountain gun |
| QF 4-inch naval gun Mk I – III | United Kingdom | 102 mm naval gun |
| QF 4-inch naval gun Mk IV, XII, XXII | United Kingdom | 102 mm naval and submarine gun |
| QF 4-inch naval gun Mk V | United Kingdom | 102 mm dual purpose ship and anti-aircraft gun |
| QF 4-inch naval gun Mk XVI | United Kingdom | 102 mm dual purpose ship and anti-aircraft gun |
| QF 4-inch naval gun Mk XIX | United Kingdom | 102 mm dual purpose ship and anti-aircraft gun |
| QF 4-inch naval gun Mk XXIII | United Kingdom | 102 mm submarine gun |
| QF 4.5-inch howitzer | United Kingdom | 114 mm howitzer |
| QF 4.5-inch Mk I – V naval gun | United Kingdom | 113 mm dual purpose ship and anti-aircraft gun |
| QF 4.7-inch Mk I – IV naval gun | United Kingdom | 120 mm naval gun |
| RBL 12-pounder 8 cwt Armstrong gun | United Kingdom | 76.2 mm field gun |
| Rheinmetall Rh-120 | Germany | 120 mm tank gun |
| Rheinmetall LTA2 | Germany | 105 mm tank gun |
| Rimailho Model 1904TR | Italy | 155 mm howitzer |
| RML 2.5-inch mountain gun | United Kingdom | 63.5 mm mountain gun |
| RML 6.3-inch howitzer | United Kingdom | 160 mm Howitzer |
| RT F1 | France | 120 mm towed mortar |
| Skoda 37 mm Model 1937 | Czechoslovakia | 37 mm anti-tank gun |
| Skoda 75 mm Model 15 | Austria-Hungary | 75 mm mountain gun |
| Skoda 75 mm Model 1928 | Czechoslovakia | 75 mm gun |
| Skoda 75 mm Model 1936 | Czechoslovakia | 75 mm gun |
| Skoda 75 mm Model 1939 | Czechoslovakia | 75 mm gun |
| Skoda 100 mm Model 1916 | Austria-Hungary | 100 mm mountain gun |
| Skoda 100 mm M. 16/19 | Czechoslovakia | 100 mm mountain gun |
| Skoda 105 mm Model 1939 | Czechoslovakia | 105 mm gun |
| Skoda 150 mm Model 1918 | Austria-Hungary | 150 mm gun |
| Skoda 305 mm | Austria-Hungary | 305 mm siege gun |
| Skoda K-series | Czechoslovakia | 149 mm field gun |
| Skoda Model 1928 gun | Czechoslovakia | 149 mm field gun |
| SLAM Pampero MRL | Argentina | 105 mm 16 tube SP rocket launcher |
| SLWH Pegasus | Singapore | 155 mm howitzer |
| Soltam 845P | Israel | 155 mm towed howitzer |
| Soltam M-66 | Israel | 160 mm mortar |
| Soltam M-68 | Israel | 155 mm howitzer |
| Soltam M-71 | Israel | 155 mm howitzer |
| St Chamond 75 mm gun | France | 75 mm field gun |
| TRF1 | France | 155 mm howitzer |
| Type 4 15 cm howitzer | Japan | 149 mm howitzer |
| Type 14 10 cm Cannon | Japan | 105 mm field gun |
| Type 38 10 cm Cannon | Japan | 105 mm field gun |
| Type 38 15 cm howitzer | German Empire | 149 mm howitzer |
| Type 38 75 mm field gun | Japan | 75 mm field gun |
| Type 41 75 mm cavalry gun | Japan | 75 mm field gun |
| Type 41 75 mm mountain gun | Japan | 75 mm mountain gun |
| Type 59 field gun | China | 130 mm field gun |
| Type 60 howitzer | China | 122 mm field gun |
| Type 66 gun-howitzer | China | 152 mm howitzer |
| Type 83 howitzer | China | 152 mm howitzer |
| Type 88 | China | 155 mm towed howitzer |
| Type 89 15 cm cannon | Japan | 149 mm field gun |
| Type 91 10 cm howitzer | Japan | 105 mm howitzer |
| Type 92 10 cm cannon | Japan | 105 mm field gun |
| Type 92 battalion gun | Japan | 70 mm infantry gun |
| Type 94 75 mm mountain gun | Japan | 75 mm mountain gun |
| Type 95 75 mm field gun | Japan | 75 mm field gun |
| Type 96 15 cm howitzer | Japan | 149 mm howitzer |
| VCTM | Argentina | 120 mm SP mortar (Vehículo de Combate Transporte de Mortero) |
| VCA 155 | Argentina | 155 mm SP howitzer |
| WA 021 | China | 155 mm towed howitzer |

== See also ==
- Artillery
- List of artillery by country
- List of World War II artillery
- List of naval guns
- List of weapons
- List of tank main guns
- Glossary of British ordnance terms

Infantry support weapons

- List of grenade launchers
- List of recoilless rifles
