= 10.5 cm 31.M field gun =

- Type: Heavy field gun
- Place of origin: Sweden/Hungary

Service history
- Used by: Kingdom of Hungary
- Wars: World War II

Production history
- Designer: Bofors (Sweden)
- Designed: 1927-1931
- Manufacturer: MÁVAG (Hungary)
- Developed from: 10.5 cm cannon Model 1927

Specifications
- Mass: 5,100 kg (11,243.58 lb) (in firing position); 5,995 kg (13,216.71 lb) (in travel position)
- Barrel length: 5,250 mm (17.22 ft) L/50
- Crew: 9 (Note: Note: this information is from the previous model 1927 gun, so it may still be true for this gun, but it might also be different.)
- Shell: 105×567mmR (Note: Note: this information is from the previous model 1927 gun, so it may still be true for this gun, but it might also be different.)
- Shell weight: 17.5 kg (38.58 lb)
- Caliber: 105 mm (4.13 in)
- Breech: Interrupted screw
- Recoil: Hydropneumatic (Note: Note: this information is from the previous model 1927 gun, so it may still be true for this gun, but it might also be different.)
- Carriage: Split trail
- Elevation: -5° / +45°
- Traverse: 45°
- Rate of fire: 6–8 rounds/min (Note: Note: this information is from the previous model 1927 gun, so it may still be true for this gun, but it might also be different.)
- Muzzle velocity: 825 m/s (2,710 ft/s)
- Maximum firing range: 19.5 km (21,300 yd)

The 10.5 cm 31.M ágyú or Bofors 105 mm cannon model 1931 was a heavy field gun designed by Sweden and produced/used by Hungary on the Eastern Front in World War II.

== History ==
In the late 1920s, Swedish Bofors with assistance from German company Krupp developed several 105 mm field guns that can mainly be divided into two types - a 4-ton class and a 5-ton class. The M1927 and M1934 (an improved version of the M1927) were in the 4 ton class, while the M1931 was in the 5 ton class. These guns shared a carriage with the similar 15 cm M1931 howitzer, which Hungary also used. This was done to standardise parts, simplifying production and lowering costs. In 1931, Hungary bought the licence for the M1931 gun and commissioned MÁVAG to produce it as the 10.5 cm 31.M field gun.

The 10.5 cm 31.M field gun differed from the original M27 and M34 guns in many specifications; it was heavier, had a longer barrel, higher muzzle velocity, more range, and fired a heavier shell, among other differences. The 31.Ms were mechanised artillery guns (towed by vehicles rather than horses) and were used by artillery units which supported infantry, mechanised infantry and tanks. Not many of these guns were manufactured and all were lost in the Ostrogozhsk–Rossosh Offensive in January 1943.

The 10.5 cm 31.M field gun and 15 cm 31.M howitzer were some of the most advanced and elite artillery in the Hungarian inventory during the war, and they were well-liked weapons that performed on par with modern artillery of other nations, however Hungary did not have enough modern artillery pieces and often had to supplement them with weaker, more outdated guns. The 10.5 cm 31.M field gun may have been the longest range artillery gun in the Hungarian inventory.
