= 10 cm Feldhaubitze M 99 =

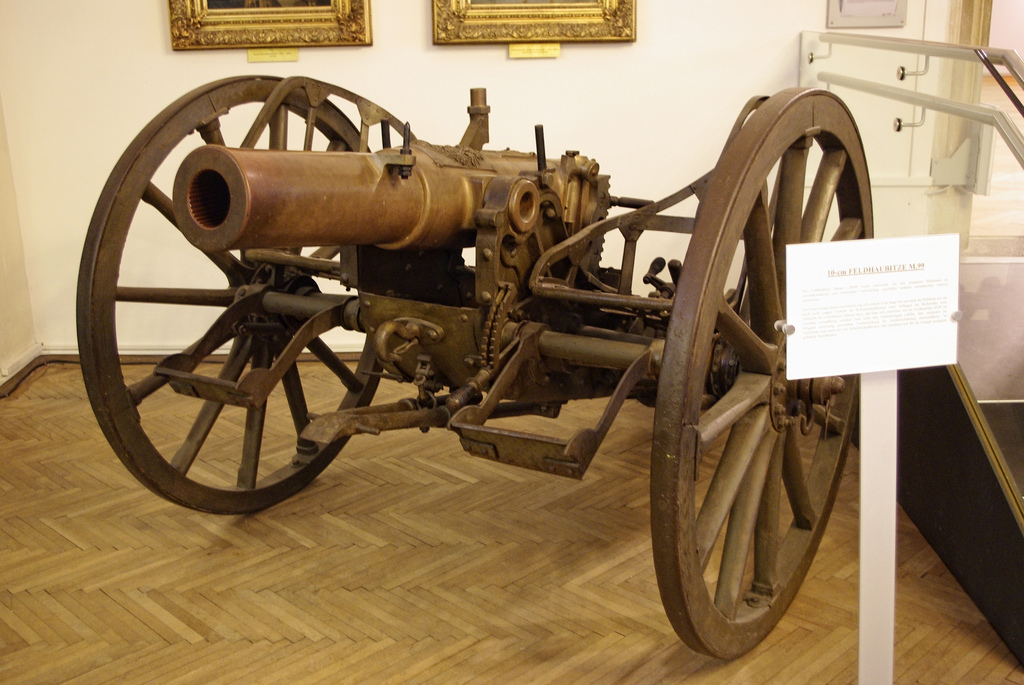
- 10 cm M. 99 Feldhaubitze in the HGM, Vienna
- Type: Field howitzer
- Place of origin: Austria-Hungary

Service history
- In service: 1903–1918
- Used by: Austria-Hungary
- Wars: World War I

Production history
- Designed: 1899–1902

Specifications
- Mass: 997 kg (2,198 lb)
- Barrel length: 1.35 m (4 ft 5 in) L/13
- Width: 1.56 metres (5 ft 1 in)
- Shell: 14.3 kilograms (32 lb)
- Caliber: 104 millimetres (4.1 in)
- Breech: eccentric interrupted screw
- Carriage: box trail
- Muzzle velocity: 305 m/s (1,000 ft/s)
- Maximum firing range: 6,100 m (6,700 yd)

The 10 cm Feldhaubitze M 99 was a howitzer used by Austria-Hungary during World War I.

It had a barrel from the so-called steel bronze (92% copper bronze strengthened by autofrettage which was used due to the lack of steel industry in Austria, see Franz von Uchatius), and lacked a modern recoil system, using only an ineffective spring-mounted spade brake, so was virtually obsolescent on its introduction. Nonetheless, it was the standard field howitzer for the Austrian Army at the outbreak of the war.

It donated its barrel to the 10 cm Gebirgshaubitze M 99, although few of those were made, being largely replaced by a version of the standard Feldhaubitze M 99 with a narrow, 1.3 metres (51 in) carriage for use on mountain paths. The axle seats were deleted from these narrow carriages in the interest of saving weight.

== Gallery ==
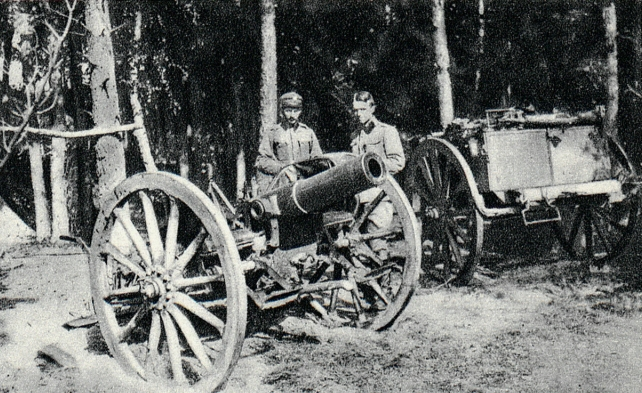

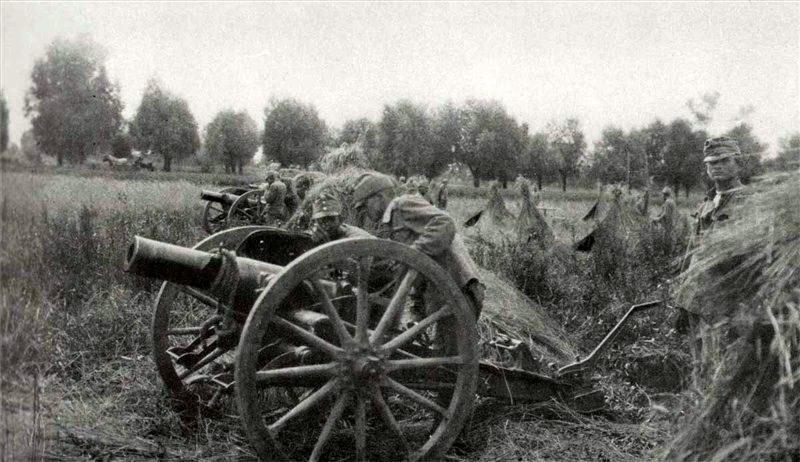

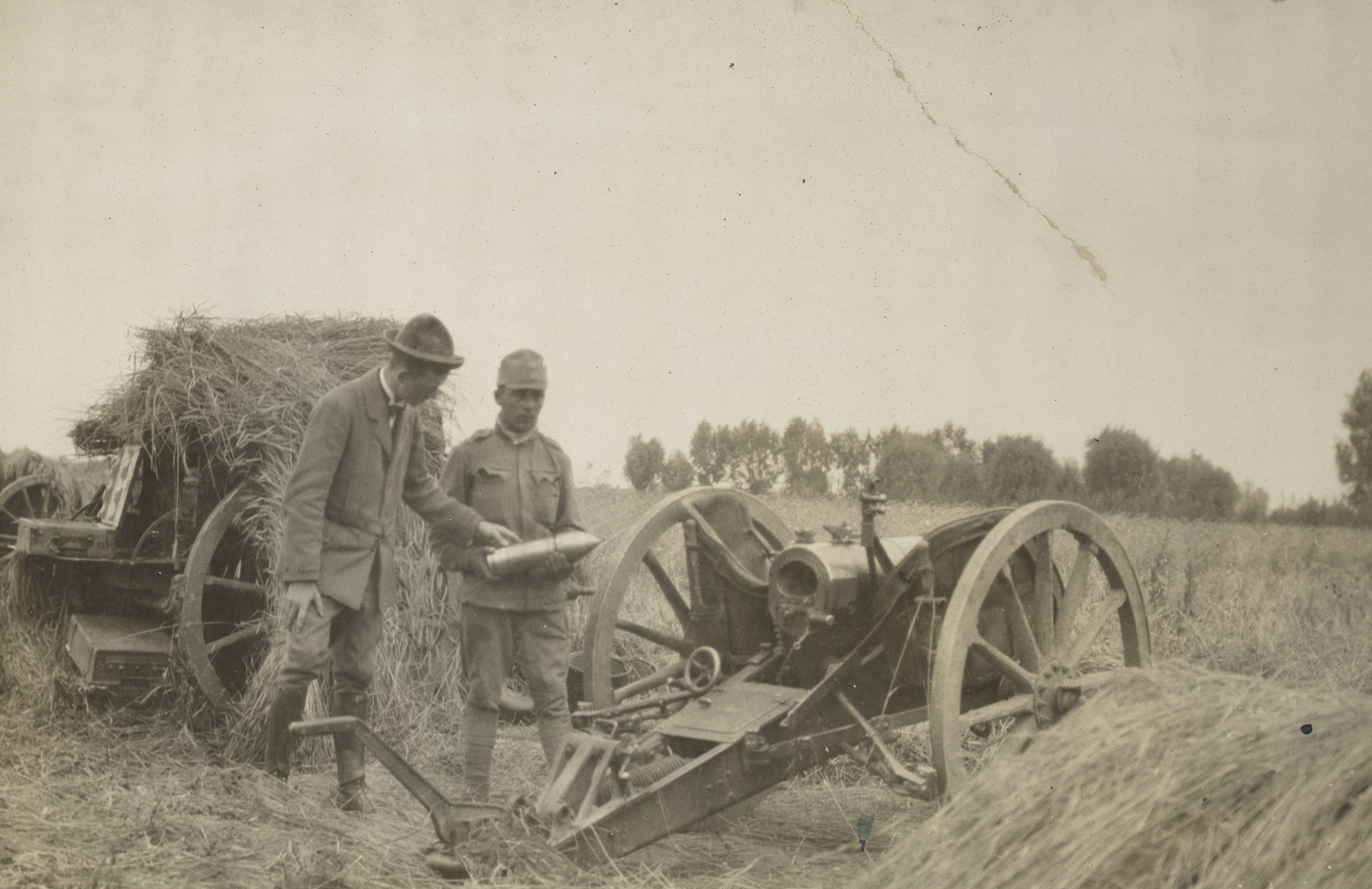

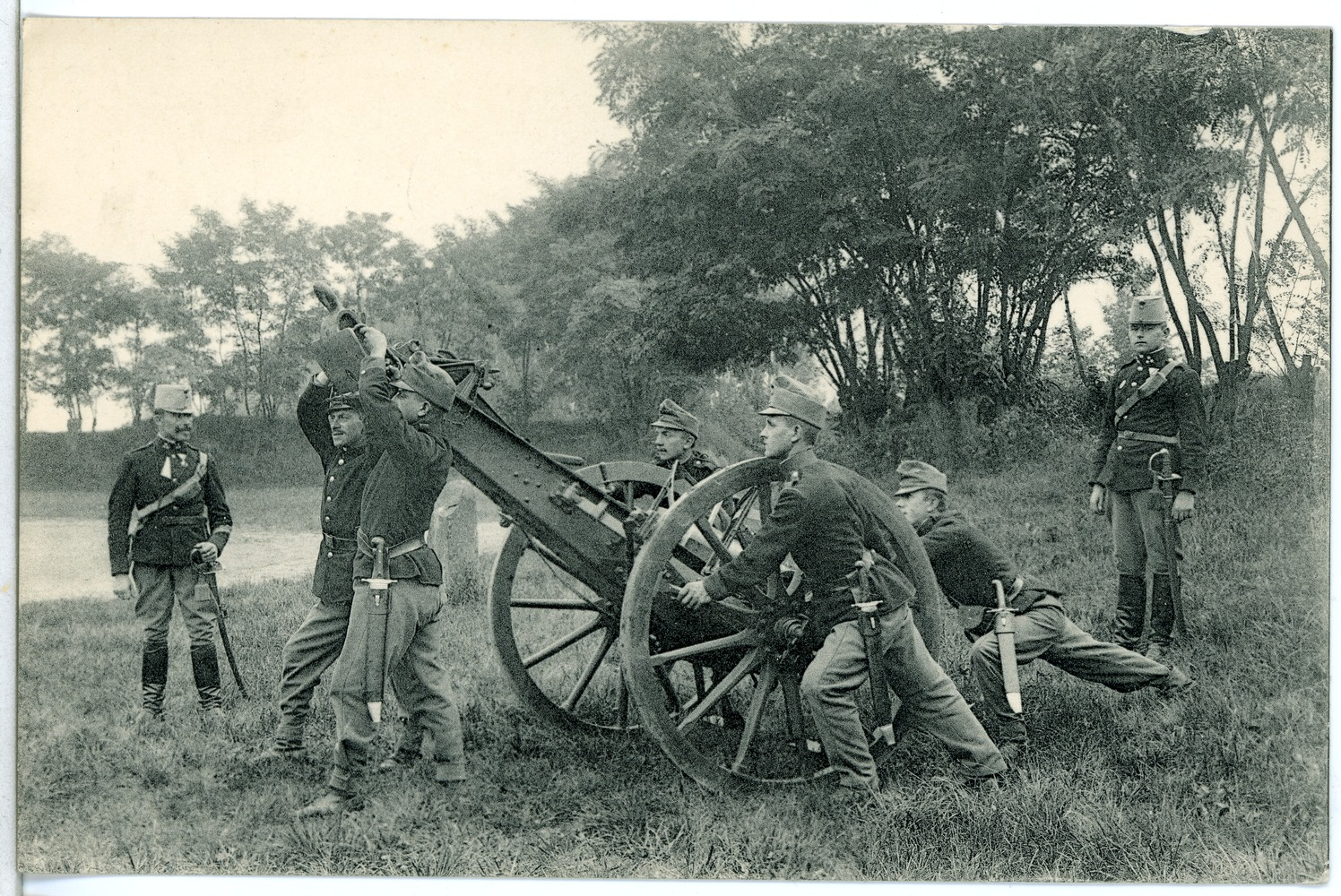

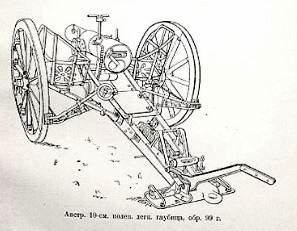
