= 10 cm Gebirgshaubitze M 8 =

10 cm M. 8 Gebirgshaubitze
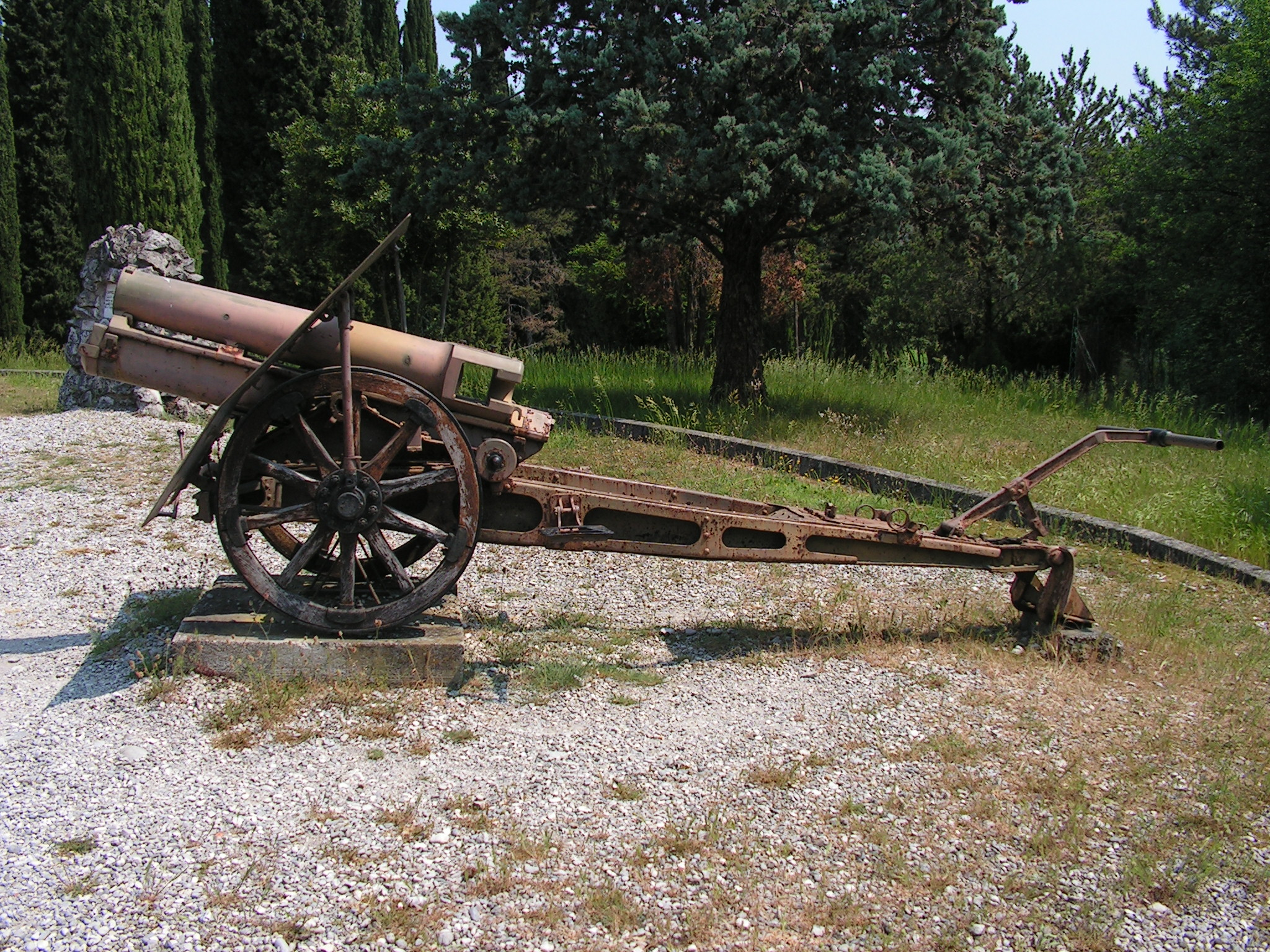
- M.10 at an Italian military cemetery
- Type: Mountain howitzer
- Place of origin: Austria-Hungary

Service history
- Used by: Austria-Hungary
- Wars: World War I

Specifications
- Shell: 14.3 kg (31 lb 8 oz)
- Caliber: 104 mm (4.1 in)
- Breech: Horizontal sliding-wedge
- Carriage: Box trail

The 10 cm Gebirgshaubitze M 8 was a mountain howitzer used by Austria-Hungary during World War I. It was the first Austrian howitzer to use a modern hydraulic variable-recoil system. It used the same ammunition as the earlier 10 cm Gebirgshaubitze M 99, which was shown to be accurate, but lacked sufficient power to destroy bunkers, during World War I. It had a gun shield. It could be mounted on a special sled carriage designated 10 cm M. 8 Gebirgsschleife designed to allow for high-angle fire between +43° and 70° elevation. This sled was transported on a special bedding cart with removable wheels. The wheels were removed when in position to fire.

The 10 cm Gebirgshaubitze M 10 was virtually identical except that it had its traversing and elevating handwheels on different sides and it was not given a high-angle mount.

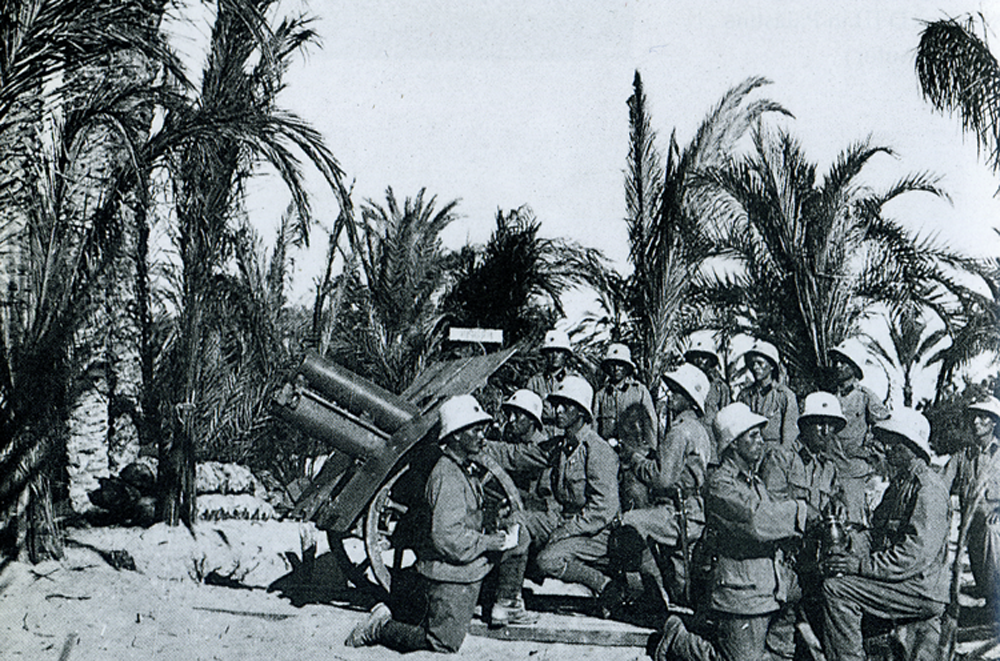
Either a M. 8 or a M. 10 in Palestine
