= 22.5 cm Minenwerfer M 15 =

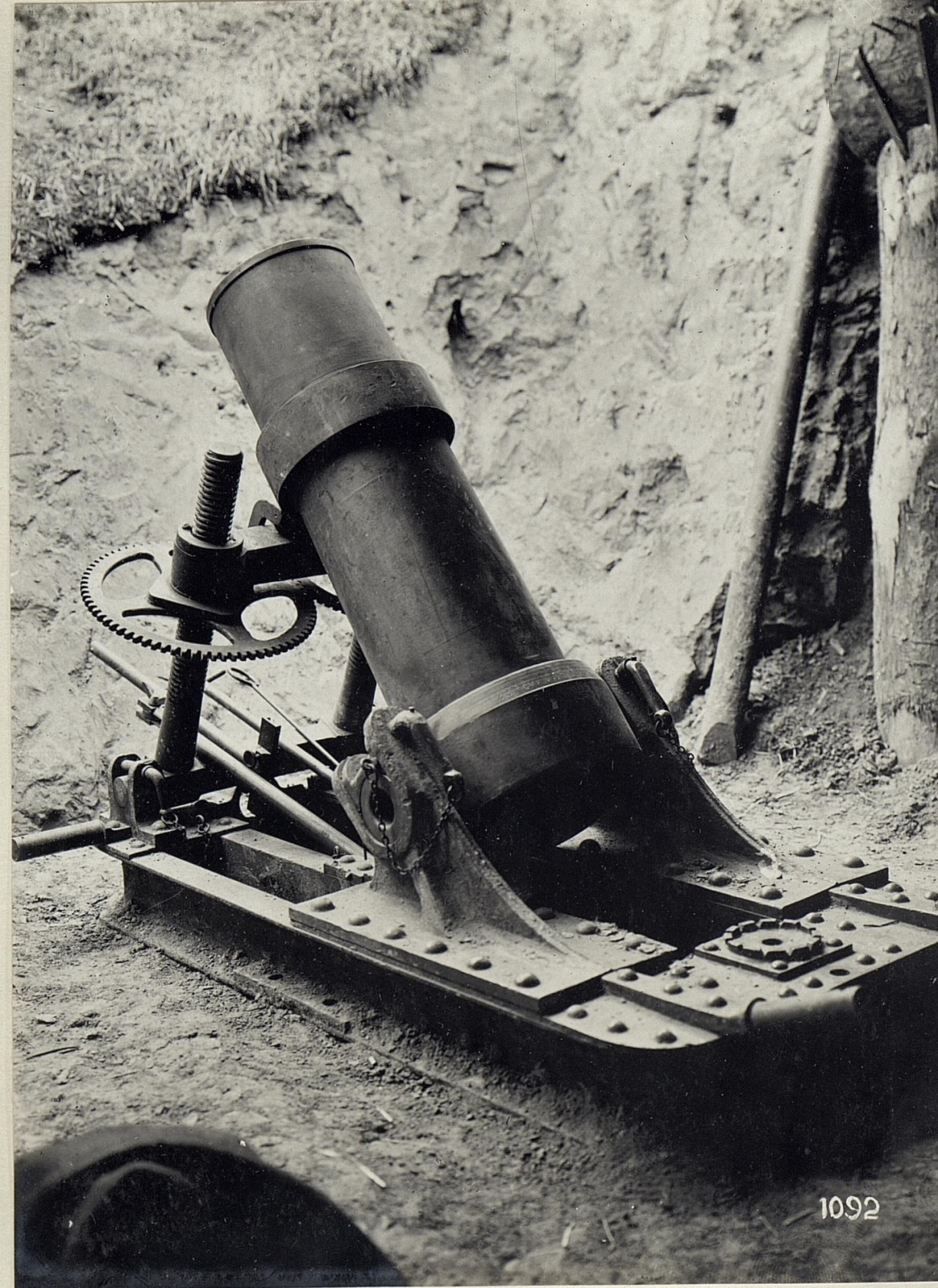
- 22.5 cm Minenwerfer in 1917
- Type: Heavy trench mortar
- Place of origin: Austria-Hungary

Service history
- In service: 1915–1918
- Used by: Austria-Hungary; Ottoman Empire
- Wars: World War I

Production history
- Designer: Böhler
- Designed: 1914-15
- Manufacturer: Böhler
- Produced: 1915-18
- No. built: 930+
- Variants: M 16 and M 17

Specifications
- Mass: 565 kg (1,246 lb)
- Length: 1.35 m (4 ft 5 in) L/6
- Shell: 48 kg (106 lb)
- Caliber: 225 mm (8.9 in)
- Elevation: +25° to +75°
- Traverse: 0°
- Rate of fire: 2 rpm
- Muzzle velocity: 170 m/s (560 ft/s)
- Maximum firing range: 675 m (738 yd)

The 22.5 cm Minenwerfer M 15 was a heavy mortar used by Austria-Hungary in World War I. It was developed by Böhler as an alternative to the German Ehrhardt 25 cm schwere Minenwerfer which Böhler was having problems building under license. It was a muzzle-loading, smooth-bore mortar that had no recoil system whatsoever. The entire mortar had to be levered around to aim at new targets. It was not particularly accurate and bombs often fell over in flight and landed on their sides so they used time instead of contact fuzes. It fired high-explosive and gas shells. For transport two wheels from the Gebirgsgechütz M 99 were used.

The M 17 version of this weapon had an elevation screw with a double thread and reinforced trunnion bearings. It's unclear how the M 16 differed from the earlier model.

== Bibliography ==
- Ortner, M. Christian. The Austro-Hungarian Artillery From 1867 to 1918: Technology, Organization, and Tactics. Vienna, Verlag Militaria, 2007 ISBN 978-3-902526-13-7
