= Bofors 75 mm mountain gun =

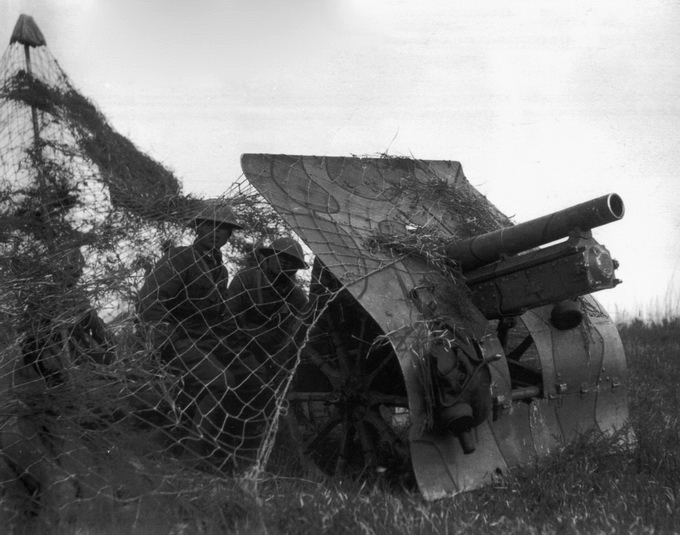
- A Bofors 75 mm gun in Chinese service
- Type: Mountain gun
- Place of origin: Sweden

Service history
- Used by: See users
- Wars: World War II

Production history
- Designer: Krupp
- Designed: 1919-1920
- Manufacturer: Bofors
- Produced: 1923 onwards
- Variants: L/20; L/22

Specifications
- Mass: Combat: 790 kg (1,740 lb); Travel: 1,000 kg (2,200 lb)
- Barrel length: 1.5 m (4 ft 11 in) L/20; 1.6 m (5 ft 3 in) L/22
- Width: .95 m (3 ft 1 in)
- Crew: 4
- Shell: Fixed QF 75 x 212mm R Fixed QF 75 x 241mm R
- Shell weight: 6.5 kg (14 lb 5 oz)
- Caliber: 75 mm (3 in)
- Breech: Horizontal sliding-wedge
- Recoil: Hydro-pneumatic
- Carriage: 2-wheeled box trail
- Elevation: -10° to +50°
- Traverse: 6°
- Rate of fire: 25 rpm
- Muzzle velocity: 470 m/s (1,500 ft/s)
- Maximum firing range: 10.5 km (6.5 mi)

The Bofors 75 mm mountain gun was a German-designed and Swedish-built mountain gun of the interwar years that was used during the Second World War.

== History ==
In 1919–1920 Krupp designed a new 7.5-cm L20 mountain gun, but the Treaty of Versailles and German disarmament banned manufacturing guns under 170 mm in calibre at the company, so it licensed the product to Bofors (also, since 1920 Krupp held 31.8% of Bofors stock through its Swedish subsidiary AB Boforsintressenter despite a 1916 law prohibiting foreigners from having over 20% stock of a Swedish business). Under a 1921 agreement the company agreed not to export any Krupp-derived materiel to the victors of WWI: the UK, US, France, Italy and Japan.

Bofors, which had never build mountain guns before, had to set up a saddler's workshop which worked until 1980s, and buy donkeys and mules to carry the pack guns. After a Swedish-made prototype passed field tests in Java, KNIL became the first customer in 1923, ordering 30 guns with ammunition and other auxiliary equipment; orders from Turkey and other countries followed starting from 1928.

== Design ==
The Bofors 75 mm mountain gun was built in two main versions, one had a barrel of 20 calibers in length and the other a barrel of 22 calibers in length. Both had a two-wheeled single-axle box-trail carriage with shield, which could be towed by a horse team or broken down into eight mule loads for transportation. In addition to its use by Sweden it was widely exported.

== Users ==
- Argentina
- Brazil
- Bulgaria
- Republic of China
- Netherlands
- Persia
- Thailand
- Sweden
- Switzerland
- Turkey

== Photo gallery ==
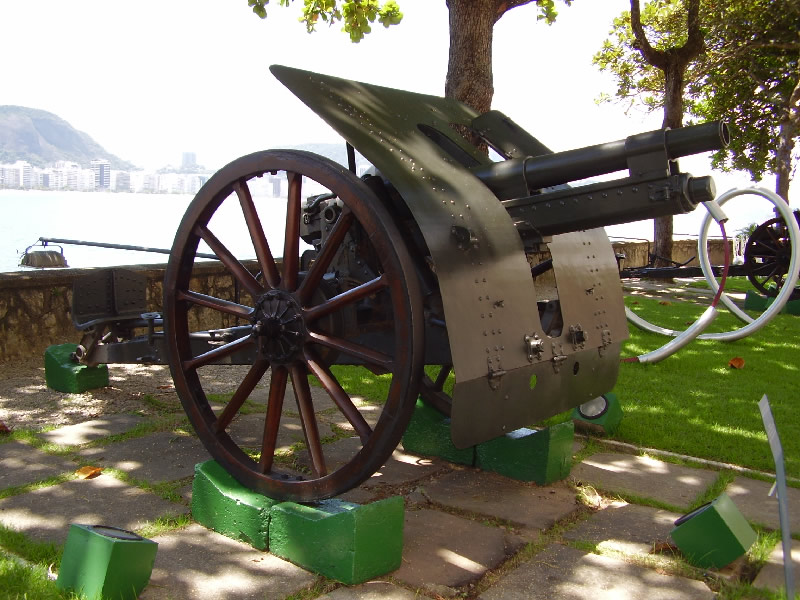
Brazilian army museum in Copacabana.

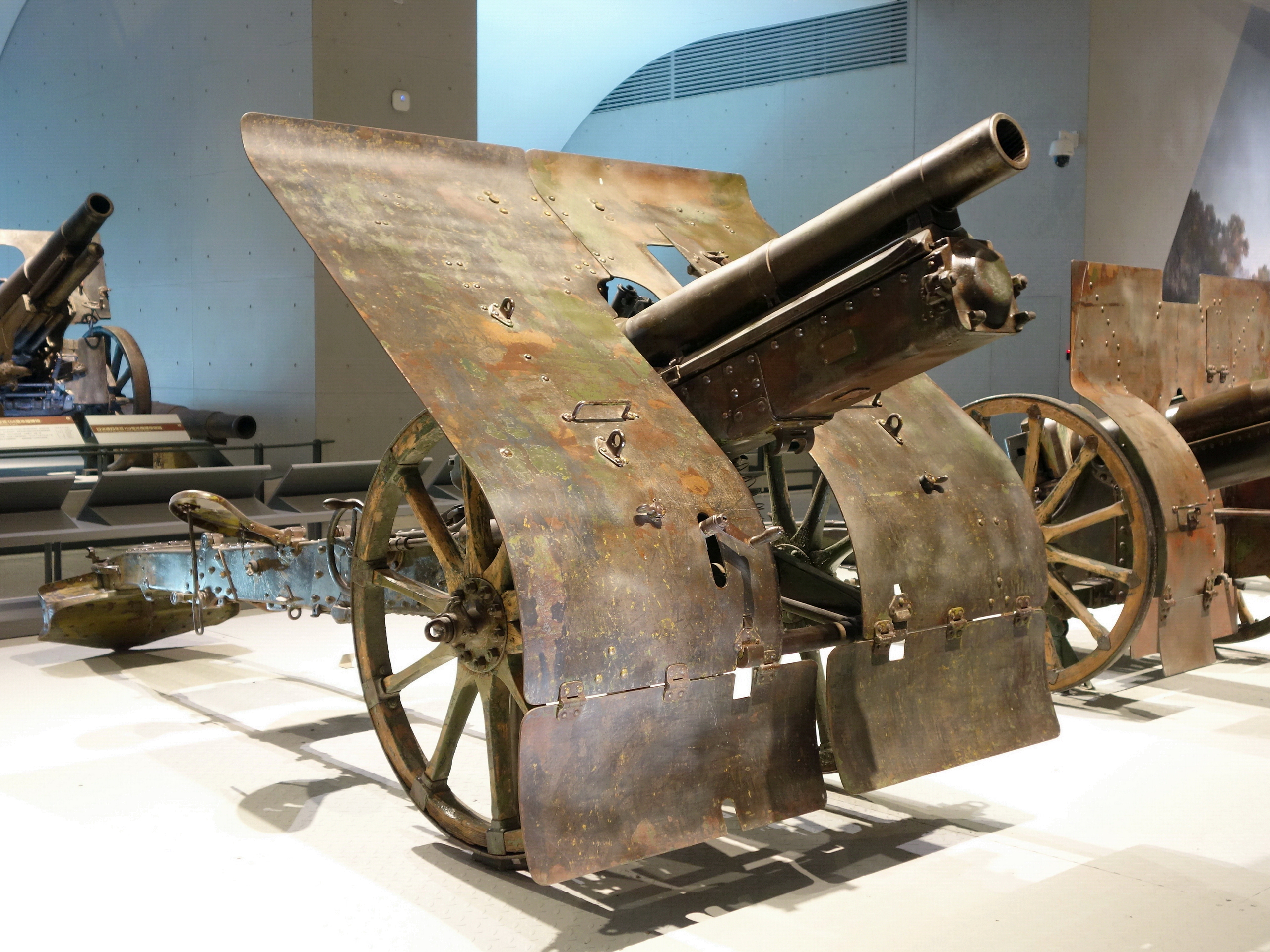
Bofors 75mm mountain gun M1930

== See also ==
- Bofors 75 mm Model 1934

== Bibliography ==
- Christopher Foss: Jane's Pocket Book of Towed Artillery. New York. Collier Books. 1977. ISBN 0354010867
