= 15 cm schwere Feldhaubitze M. 15 =

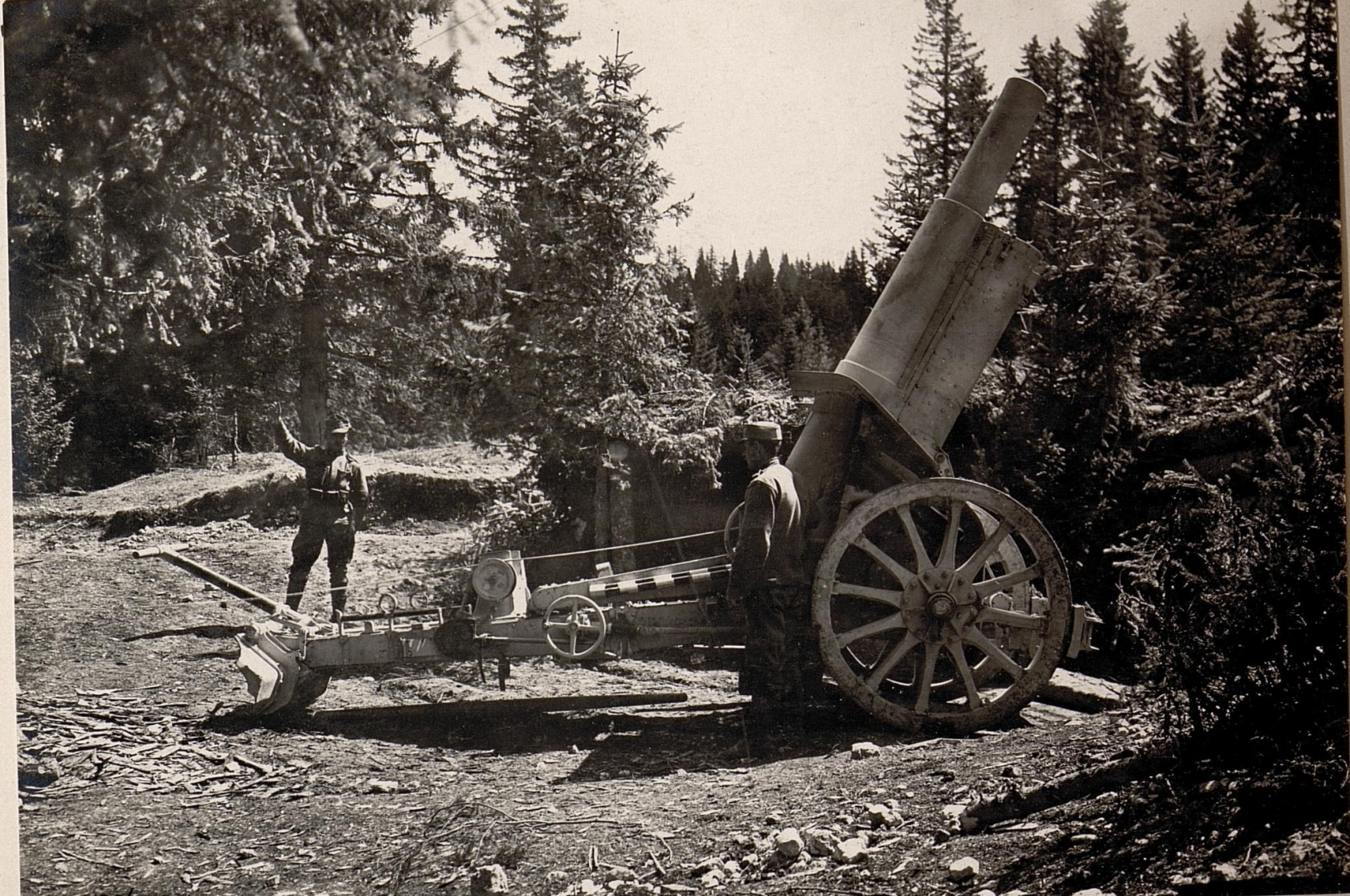
- 15 cm schwere Feldhaubitze M. 15 in May 1916
- Type: Heavy howitzer
- Place of origin: Austria-Hungary

Service history
- In service: 1916–1945
- Used by: Austria-Hungary; Austria; Czechoslovakia; Nazi Germany; Finland
- Wars: World War I World War II

Production history
- Designer: Skoda
- Designed: 1914–1916
- Manufacturer: Skoda
- Produced: 1916–1918
- No. built: 57

Specifications
- Mass: 5,560 kilograms (12,260 lb)
- Barrel length: 2.99 metres (9 ft 10 in) L/20
- Shell: separate-loading, cased charge
- Caliber: 149.1 mm (5.87 in)
- Breech: horizontal sliding-block
- Recoil: hydro-pneumatic
- Carriage: box trail
- Elevation: -5° to +65°
- Traverse: 8°
- Rate of fire: 2 rpm
- Muzzle velocity: 508 m/s (1,666 ft/s)
- Maximum firing range: 11,500 metres (12,600 yd)

The 15 cm schwere Feldhaubitze M. 15 was a heavy howitzer used by Austria-Hungary in World War I. Austrian and Czech guns were taken into Wehrmacht service after the Anschluss and the occupation of Czechoslovakia as the 15 cm schwere Feldhaubitze 15(t) or (ö).

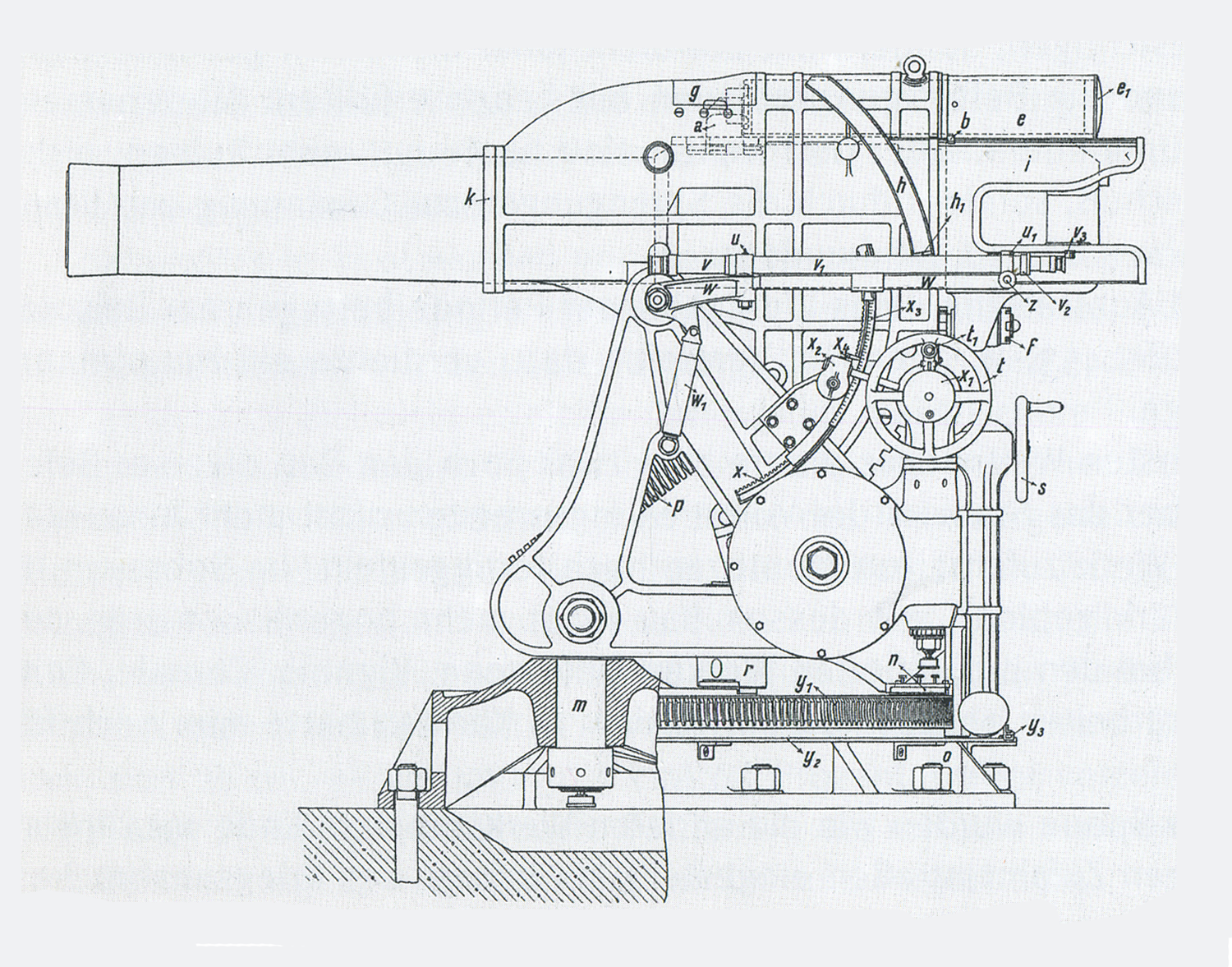
A line drawing of the 15 cm Turmhaubitze M15.

The M. 15 was adapted from a fortress turret howitzer called the 15 cm Turmhaubitze M15 designed to throw the same ammunition as the schwere Feldhaubitze M.14 some 3.5 kilometres (3,800 yd) further. It didn't normally breakdown for transport, but could be disassembled into four loads for transport in mountainous areas.

The first five weapons were delivered in the first half of 1916. A total of 57 barrels and 56 carriages were completed by the end of the war.

The Finns purchased twenty weapons after the end of the Winter War. They arrived on the SS Widor on 9 October 1940. They were initially issued to Heavy Artillery Battalions 21, 22 and 28. They were unpopular with the field artillery as they were thought to be too heavy and were withdrawn from field duty during the Continuation War. Some went to equip the Maaselkä Fortification Artillery Battalions.
