= Bofors 75 mm Model 1934 =

Bofors 75mm Model 1934
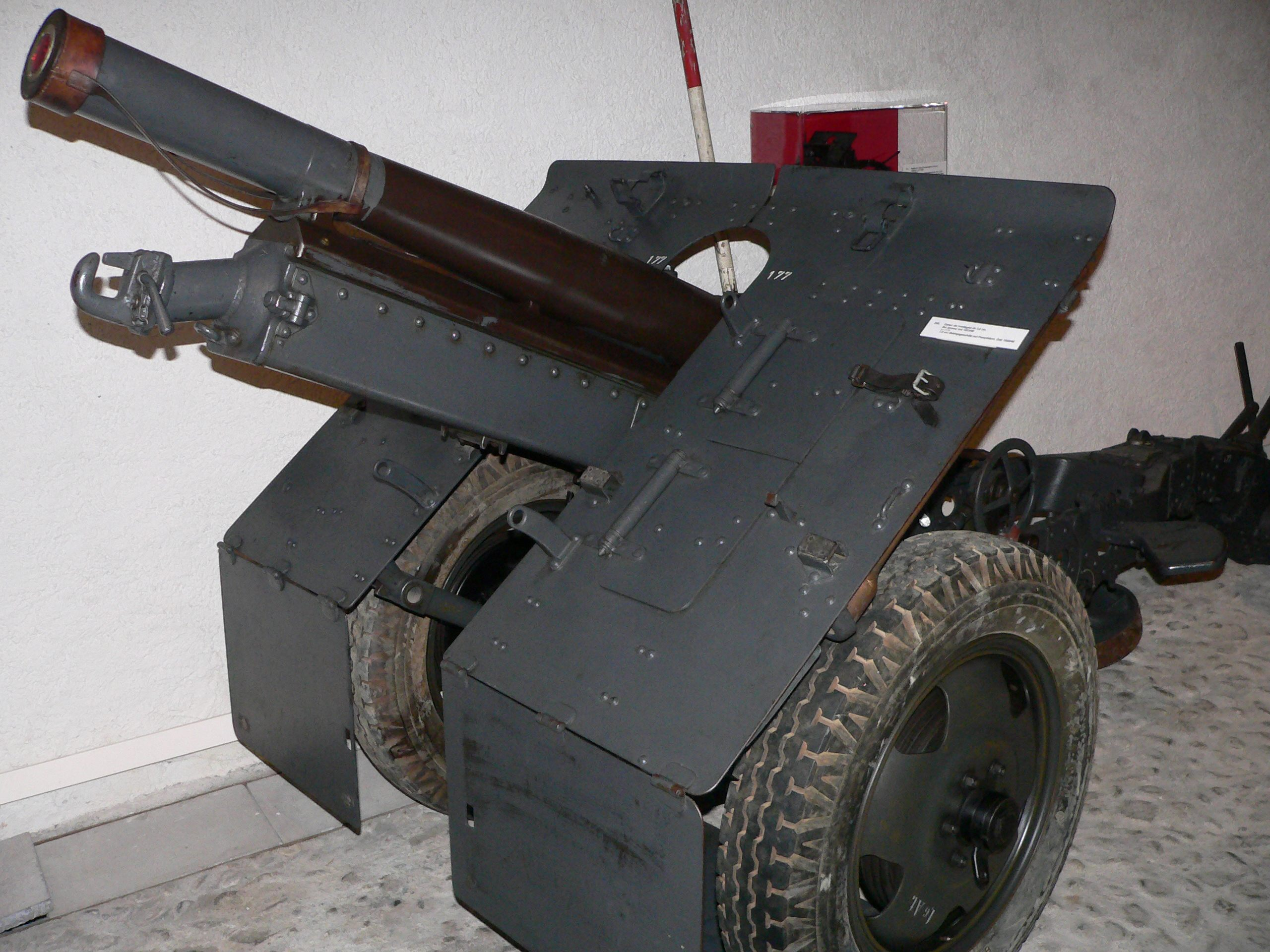
- Swiss 7.5 cm L/24 mountain gun M1933/48
- Type: Mountain gun
- Place of origin: Sweden

Service history
- Used by: See users
- Wars: World War II

Production history
- Designer: Bofors
- Manufacturer: Bofors

Specifications
- Mass: 928 kg (2,046 lb)
- Barrel length: 1.8 m (5 ft 11 in) L/24
- Shell: Fixed QF 75 x 212mm R
- Shell weight: 6.59 kg (14.5 lb)
- Caliber: 75 mm (3 in)
- Breech: Horizontal sliding-wedge
- Recoil: Hydro-pneumatic
- Carriage: Box trail
- Elevation: -4° to +56° (long carriage) -10° to +50° (short carriage)
- Traverse: 7° 54'
- Muzzle velocity: 455 m/s (1,490 ft/s)
- Effective firing range: 9,300 m (10,200 yd)

The Bofors 75 mm Model 1934 was a mountain gun produced in Sweden by Bofors and sold abroad widely. The Model 1934 was used by Germany, Belgium, the Netherlands and China in World War II. Germany bought a small number of guns (12) for evaluation and training before the war and designated them as the 7.5 cm Gebirgshaubitze 34. Belgian guns, known by them as the Canon de 75 mle 1934, captured by Germany were designated as 7.5 cm Gebirgskanone 228(b). The later model 1936 was purchased by Bulgaria.

== Design ==
The Netherlands purchased a pack loadable version for their colonial-army in the Dutch East Indies, a region covered by thick forests and mountains. The pack loadable version could be broken down into eight mule loads or towed by a four horse team, with a further six mules to carry ammunition and other supplies. The Dutch guns were used briefly during the Dutch East Indies campaign in 1941–42. Many of these went on to serve with the Imperial Japanese Army after the Dutch East Indies fell. These were used by the IJA until ammunition stocks were depleted.

The model purchase by Belgium was not a pack gun and was equipped for towing by motor transport. The Belgian model had a one-piece box-trail that was hinged to fold upwards to reduce towing length and was equipped with steel disc wheels with rubber tires.

== Users ==
- Argentina
- Belgium
- Brazil
- Bulgaria
- Nazi Germany
- Netherlands
- Paraguay
- Persia
- Republic of China
- Sweden
- Switzerland
- Japan

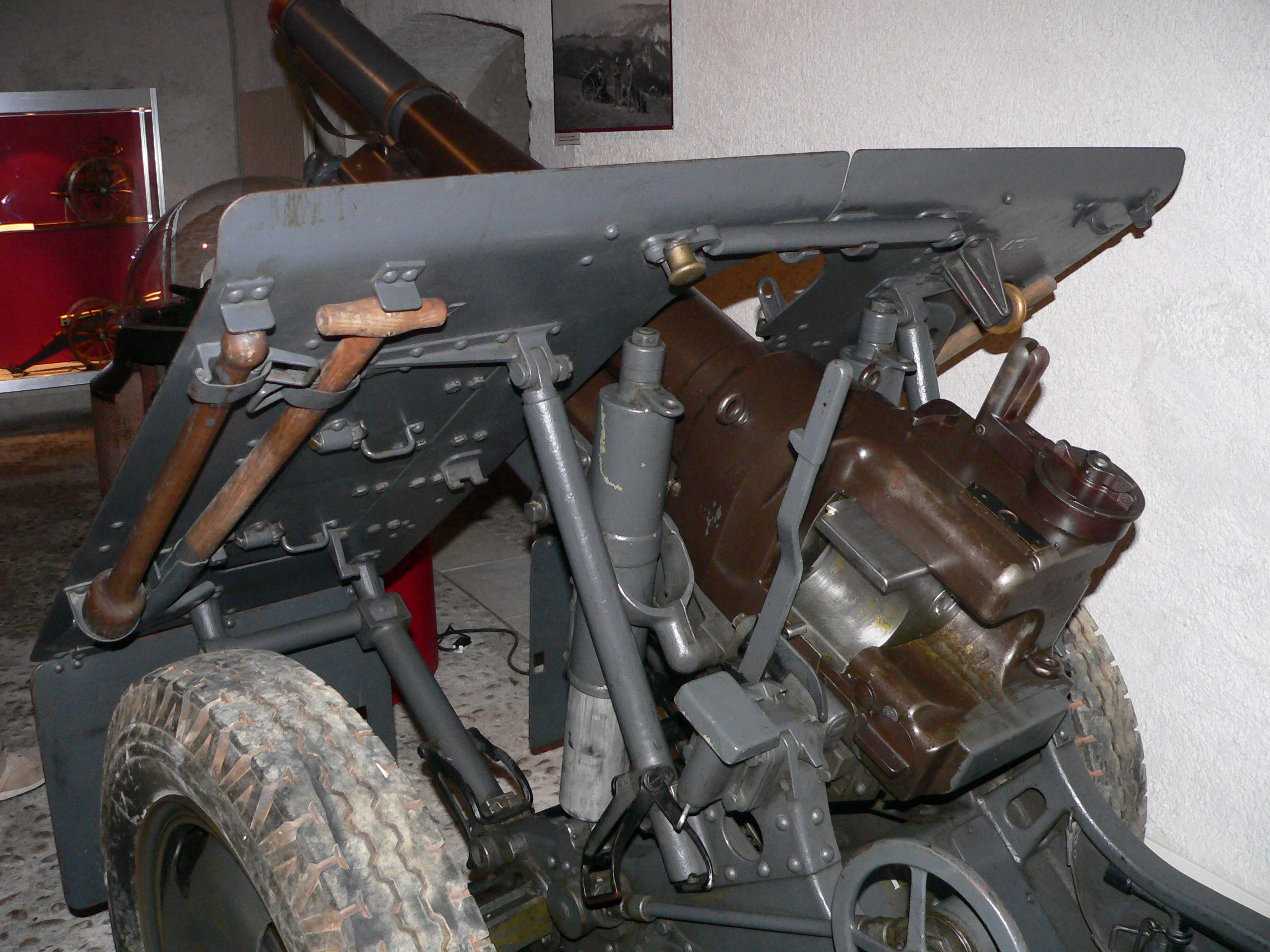
75mm Bofors mountain gun M1933 modernized for mechanical towing in 1948.

== See also ==
- Bofors 75 mm mountain gun

== Sources ==
- Chamberlain, Peter & Gander, Terry. Infantry, Mountain and Airborne Guns. New York, Arco
- Gander, Terry and Chamberlain, Peter. Weapons of the Third Reich: An Encyclopedic Survey of All Small Arms, Artillery and Special Weapons of the German Land Forces 1939-1945. New York: Doubleday, 1979 ISBN 0-385-15090-3
- Bishop, Chris, ed. Encyclopedia of Weapons of World War II. New York, Barnes and Noble, 1998 ISBN 0-7607-1022-8
