= 10.5 cm cannon Model 1927 =

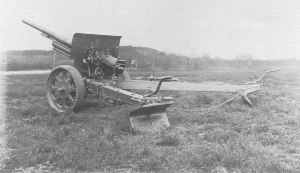
- Type: Heavy field gun
- Place of origin: Sweden

Service history
- In service: 1927–1945
- Wars: World War II

Production history
- Designer: Bofors
- Designed: 1927
- Manufacturer: Bofors
- Produced: 1927–1940s
- Variants: 10.5 cm Model 1931; 10.5 cm Model 1934

Specifications
- Mass: 3,650 kg (8,046.87 lb)
- Barrel length: 4.20 m (13.78 ft) L/40; 4.41 m (14.47 ft) L/42
- Crew: 9
- Shell: 105×567mmR
- Shell weight: 16 kg (35.27 lb)
- Caliber: 105 mm (4.13 in)
- Breech: Interrupted screw
- Recoil: Hydropneumatic
- Carriage: Split trail
- Elevation: -3° / +45°
- Traverse: 60°
- Rate of fire: 6–8 rounds/min
- Muzzle velocity: 750 m/s (2,460 ft/s)
- Maximum firing range: 16.5 km (18,000 yd)

The 10.5 cm cannon Model 1927 was a Swedish heavy field gun used by the Netherlands and later Germany during World War II.

== History ==
Four were bought by the Swedish Coastal Artillery as 10.5 cm kanon m/27s. They were later upgraded to m/34 standard as m/27-34s. They were transferred to the field artillery in 1942.

Dutch guns were known as Stuk van 10-veld. The Dutch appear to have bought guns with both 40 and 42 caliber barrel lengths. Captured weapons were designated by the Wehrmacht as the 10.5 cm Kanone 335(h).

Hungary licence built an improved version of this gun and used them as the 10.5 cm 31.M ágyú on the Eastern Front during World War II.

== Design ==
The gun was designed for motor traction with spoked steel wheels with rubber rims. The spades were removed and placed onto the trail legs for transport.

== Users ==
- Germany
- Netherlands
- Sweden
