= 10.5 cm howitzer Model 1924 =

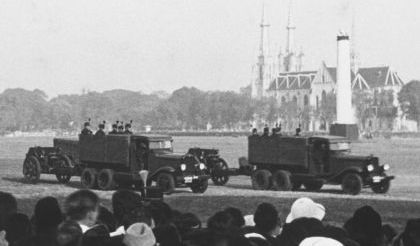
- A military parade in Jakarta.
- Type: Howitzer
- Place of origin: Sweden

Service history
- In service: 1924–1945
- Used by: Netherlands
- Wars: World War II

Production history
- Designer: Bofors
- Manufacturer: Bofors

Specifications
- Mass: 1,650 kg (3,640 lb)
- Barrel length: 2.31 m (7 ft 7 in) L/22
- Shell: 14 kg (31 lb)
- Caliber: 105 mm (4.134 in)
- Carriage: box trail
- Elevation: -5° to +45°
- Traverse: 360°
- Muzzle velocity: 475 m/s (1,560 ft/s)
- Maximum firing range: 10.5 km (6.5 mi)

The 10.5 cm howitzer Model 1924 was a howitzer used by the Netherlands during World War II. Fourteen were bought by the Royal Dutch East Indies Army, where they equipped the 1st Howitzer Artillery Battalion, from 1924 to 1945. It is unknown if the Japanese used them after conquering the Dutch East Indies in 1942.

This weapon was designed for motor traction with rubber-rimmed steel wheels. Maximum towing speed was only 30 km/h (18.6 mph). It had a firing platform that gave it 360° traverse. On mount traverse was only 8° 30'.
