= 10.5 cm kanon m/34 =

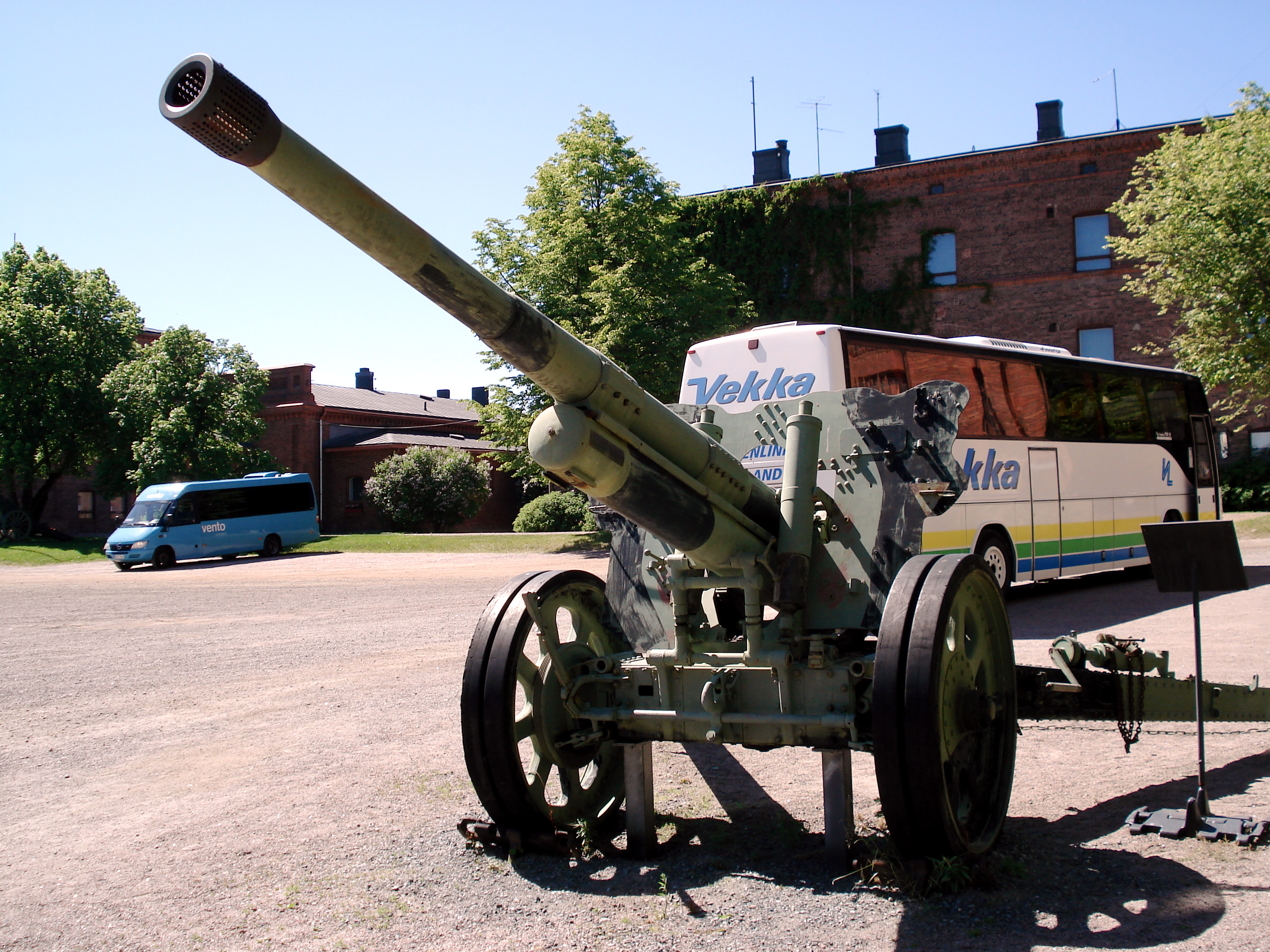
- Bofors m/34 at the Hämeenlinna Artillery Museum
- Type: Heavy field gun
- Place of origin: Sweden

Service history
- Used by: Finland; Sweden; Switzerland; Thailand
- Wars: Winter War, Continuation War

Production history
- Designer: Bofors
- Manufacturer: Bofors

Specifications
- Mass: 3,750 kilograms (8,270 lb)
- Barrel length: 4.41 metres (14 ft 6 in) L/42
- Crew: 7
- Shell: 15.3 kilograms (33 lb 12 oz)
- Caliber: 105 millimetres (4.1 in)
- Breech: horizontal sliding block
- Carriage: Split trail
- Elevation: -5° to +42°
- Traverse: 60°
- Rate of fire: 5-6 rpm
- Muzzle velocity: 800 m/s (2,600 ft/s)
- Maximum firing range: 16,300 metres (17,800 yd)

The 10.5 cm kanon m/34 was a heavy field gun produced in Sweden.

== Design ==
Designed for motor towing with steel spoked wheels with rubber rims, the m/34 was a development of the earlier 10.5 cm Cannon Model 1927, with the carriage being used by various Bofors 15 cm howitzers of the 1930s. Like most contemporary field artillery the barrels muzzle had a pepper-pot style muzzle brake to reduce recoil.

Four were purchased for the Swedish Coastal Artillery, fifty-six by the Swedish Army as the 10.5 cm Fältkanon m/34, and an additional order for eight m/34s was produced in 1942. Coastal artillery m/34s were transferred to the field artillery in 1942 under the designation of 10.5 cm Fältkanon m/34M.

== Exports ==
The m/34 enjoyed relatively good export success, considering the neutral status of Sweden, with the following countries ordering the weapon:-

Finland
Twelve guns were ordered during the Winter War but only four had been delivered by the time the conflict ended, but the remainder had been delivered before the start of the Continuation War, serving with Heavy Artillery Battalion 3 and later with Heavy Artillery Battalion 5 as the 105 K 34.
Switzerland
A license was acquired and 352 m/34s were produced, as the 10.5 cm Kanone 1935 L42.
Thailand
Thailand ordered four weapons which were delivered in 1935.
