= 25 cm schwerer Minenwerfer =

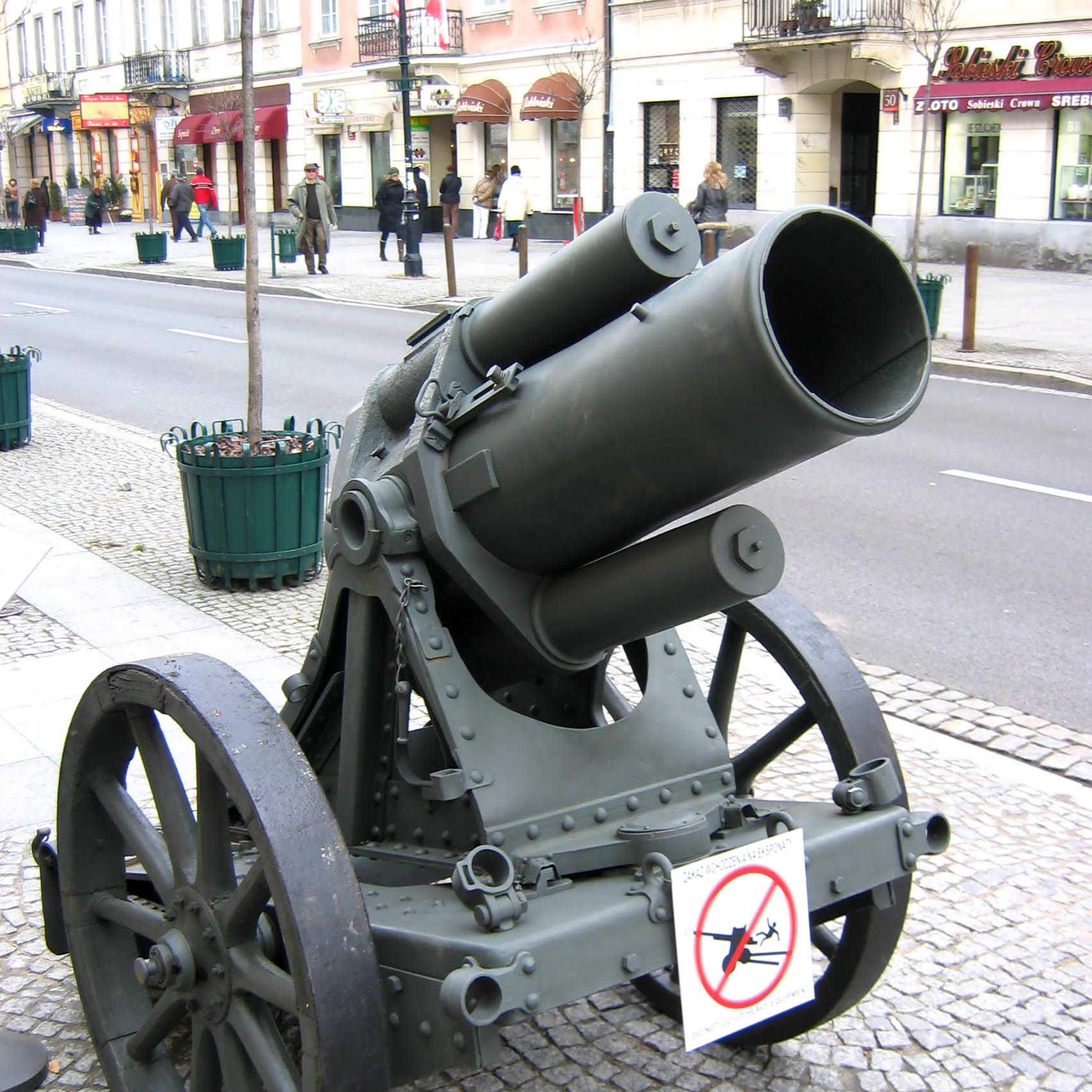
- 25 cm schwerer Minenwerfer n/A model with wheels attached, Warsaw, 2007.
- Type: Heavy trench mortar
- Place of origin: German Empire

Service history
- In service: 1910–1918
- Used by: German Empire
- Wars: World War I

Production history
- Designer: Rheinmetall
- Designed: 1907–09
- Manufacturer: Rheinmetall
- Produced: 1910–18
- No. built: approx. 1,234
- Variants: 25 cm sMW n/A

Specifications
- Mass: 768 kg (1,693 lb)
- Barrel length: a/A: 75 cm (2 ft 6 in) L/3 n/A: 1.25 m (4 ft 1 in) L/5
- Shell: separate-loading, 4 disk charges
- Calibre: 250 millimeters (9.8 in)
- Recoil: hydro-spring
- Carriage: box trail
- Elevation: +45° to 75°
- Traverse: 12°
- Rate of fire: 20 rounds per hour
- Muzzle velocity: 200 m/s (660 ft/s)
- Effective firing range: 540 m (590 yd)
- Maximum firing range: 970 m (1,060 yd)
- Sights: panoramic

The 25 cm schwerer Minenwerfer (heavy mine launcher), often abbreviated as 25 cm sMW, was a heavy mine shell launching trench mortar developed for the Imperial German Army in the first decade of the 20th century.

== Design and development ==
It was developed for use by engineer troops after the Siege of Port Arthur during the Russo-Japanese War of 1904–05 illustrated the usefulness of this class of weapon in destroying bunkers and fortifications immune to normal artillery. The 25 cm schwerer Minenwerfer was a muzzle-loading, rifled mortar that had a hydro-spring type recoil system. It fired either a 97 kg (214 lb) shell or a 50 kg (110 lb) mine shell; both containing far more explosive filler than ordinary artillery ammunition of the same caliber. The low muzzle velocity allowed for thinner shell walls, hence more space for filler for the same weight shell. The low velocity also allowed the use of explosives like ammonium nitrate–carbon that were less shock-resistant than TNT, which was in short supply. Shells filled with these substitutes nonetheless were the cause of many premature detonations, making the Minenwerfer riskier for the gun crew than normal artillery pieces.

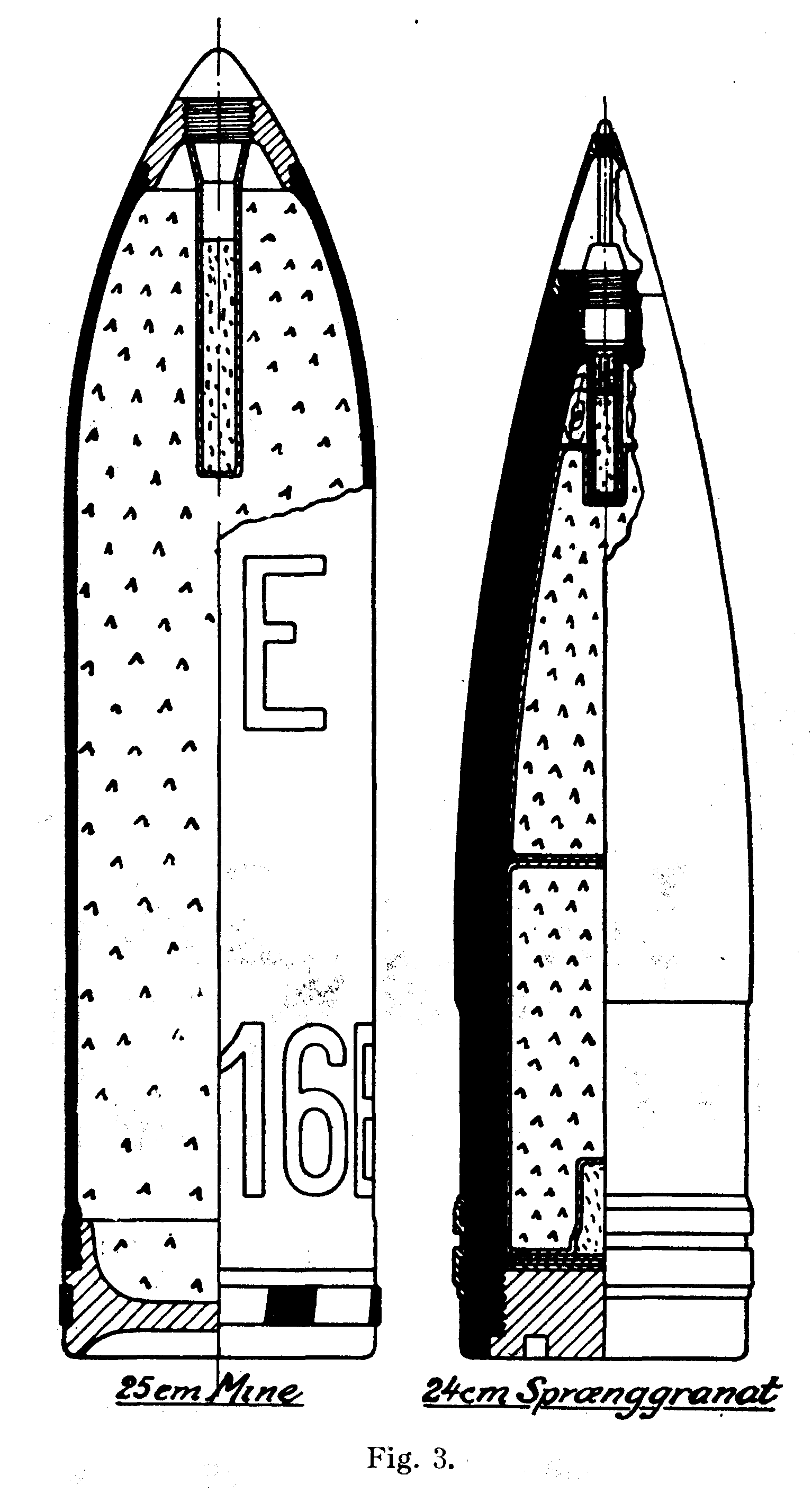
To the left, a 25 cm schwerer Minenwerfer mine shell; to the right, a 24 cm conventional high-explosive shell.

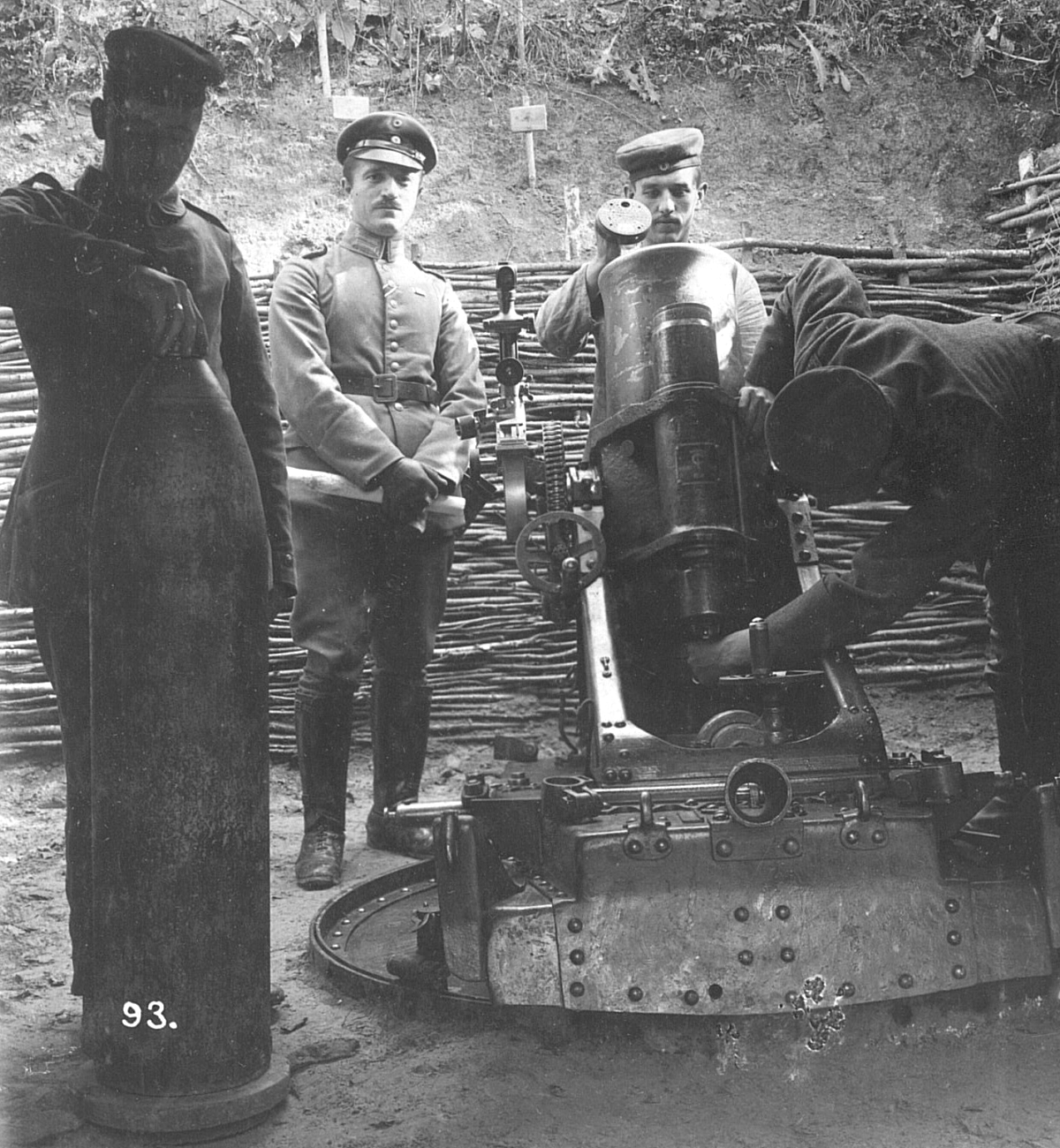
25 cm schwerer Minenwerfer in a trench. The left soldier is showing a 25 cm mine shell as used in the artillery piece.

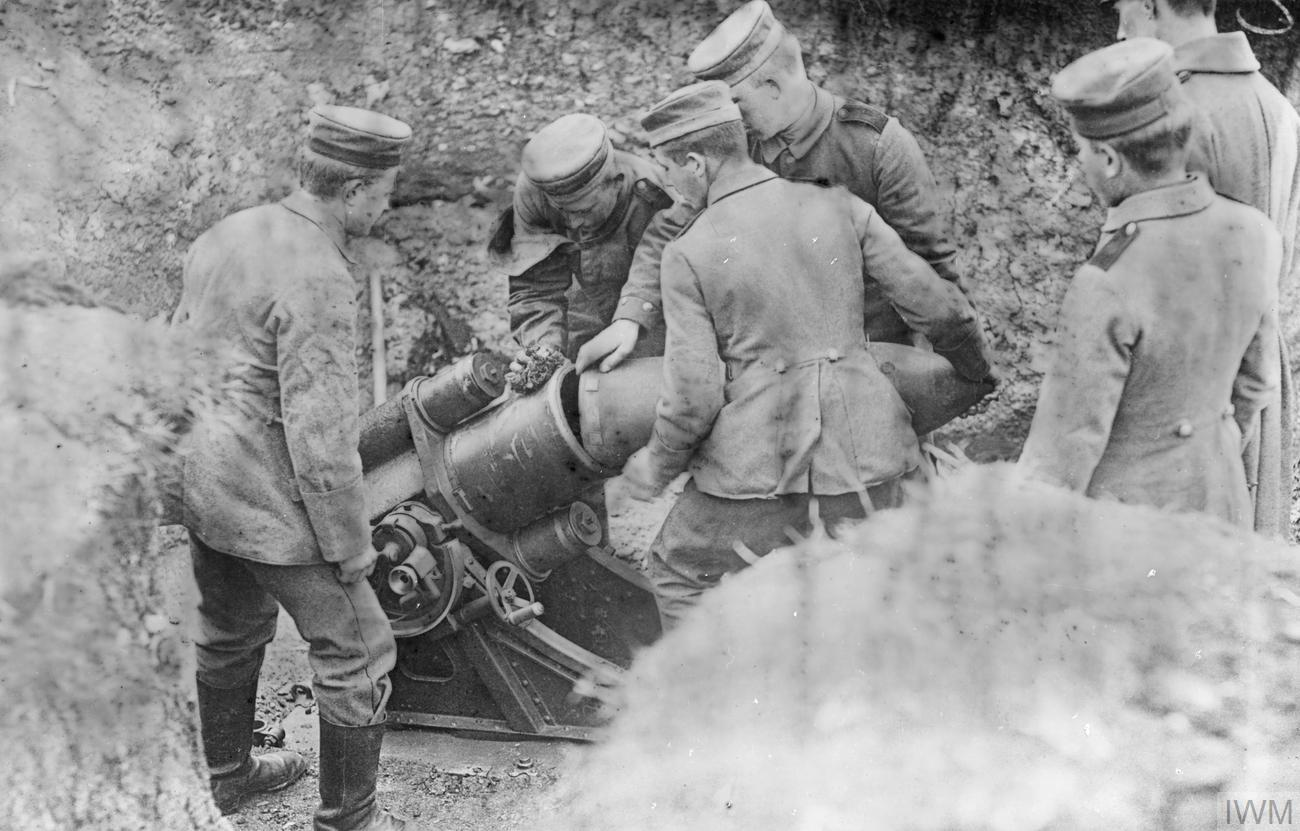
Loading a 25 cm schwerer Minenwerfer.

== Service ==
The wheels were removed and the sMW was then placed in a pit or trench at least 1.5 meters (4 ft 11 in) deep, protecting the mortar and its crew. Despite the extremely short range, the sMW proved to be potent as its massive shells were almost as effective in penetrating fortifications as the largest siege guns in the German inventory, including the 42 centimeters (17 in) Dicke Bertha (Big Bertha), a howitzer that was more than 50 times the weight of the sMW. The value of the sMW is indicated by the number in service, which increased from 44 when the war broke out, to 1,234 at its end.

In 1916, a new longer-barrelled version was put into production. This new model, which had a longer range with an L/5 barrel, was named the 25 cm schwerer Minenwerfer neuer Art (new pattern), which was abbreviated to 25 cm sMW n/A. The older, short-barrel L/3 model was then renamed 25 cm sMW a/A (alter Art) (old pattern).

A middle variant, which consisted of simply adding a 500mm barrel extension to existing a/A mortars, was the 25 cm schwerer Minenwerfer 16a.

== Gallery ==
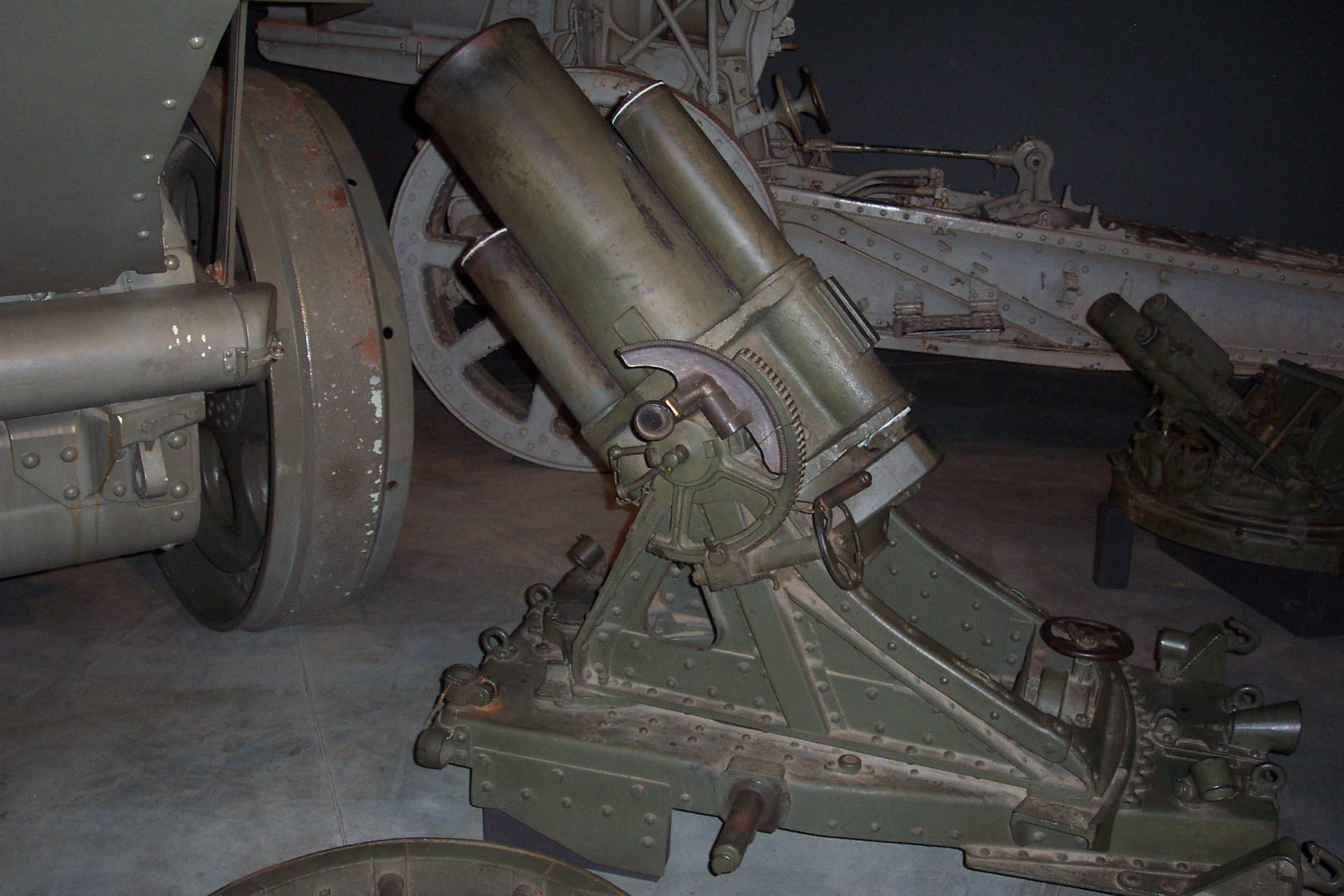
n/A model with long barrel, at the Australian War Memorial, Canberra.

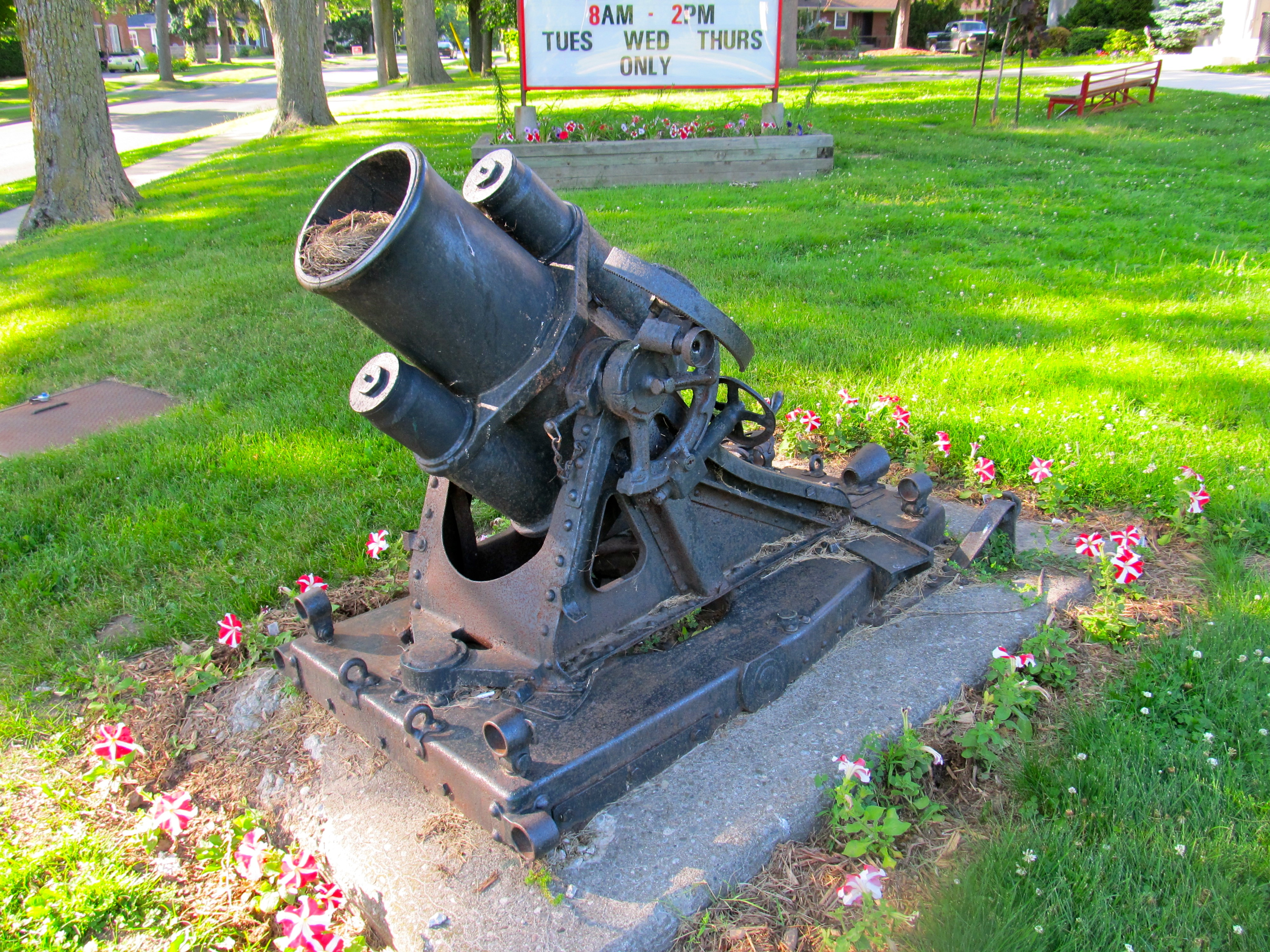
A sMW a/A at Waterford, Ontario

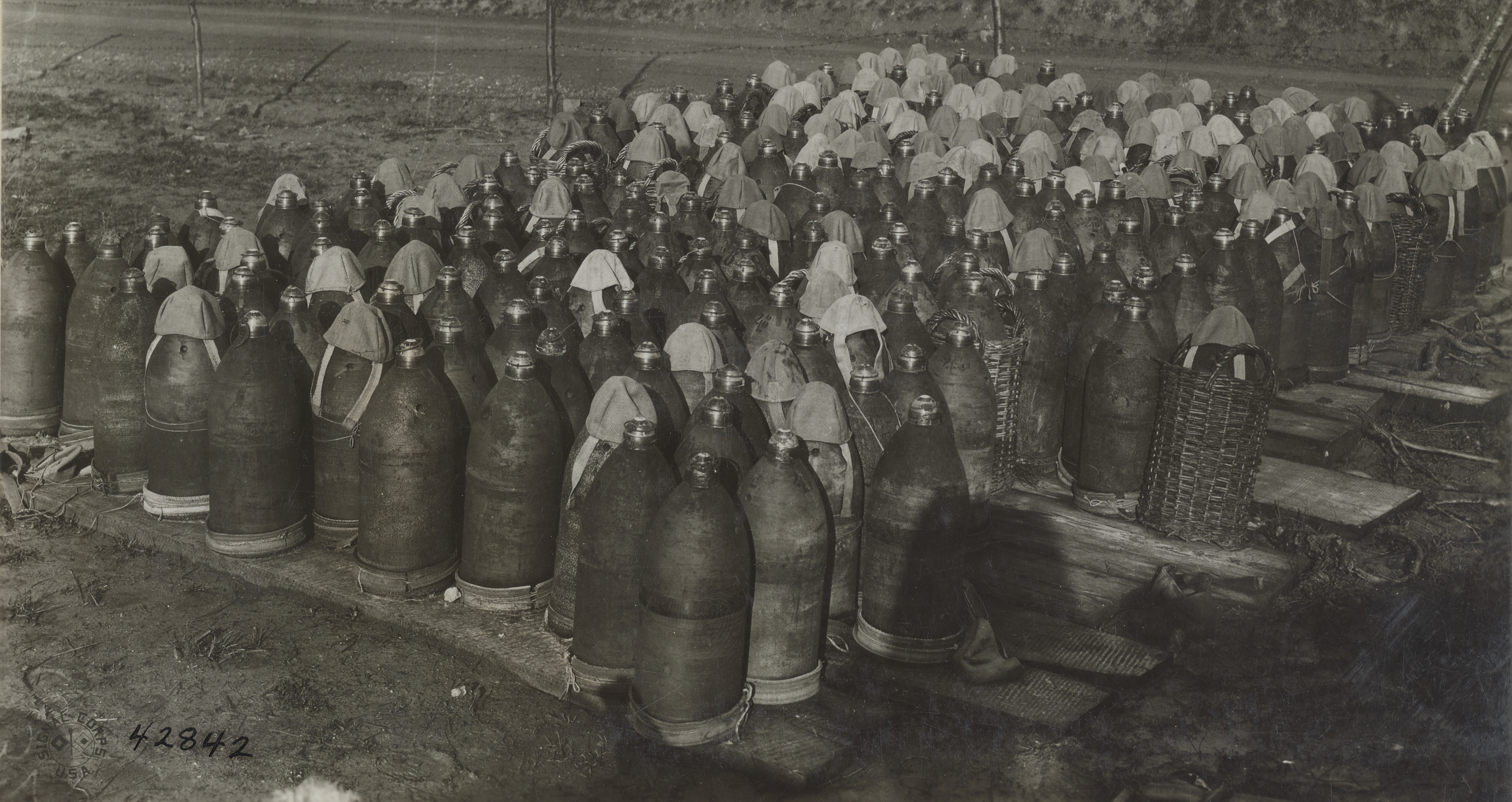
250 mm shells at a German ammunition dump.

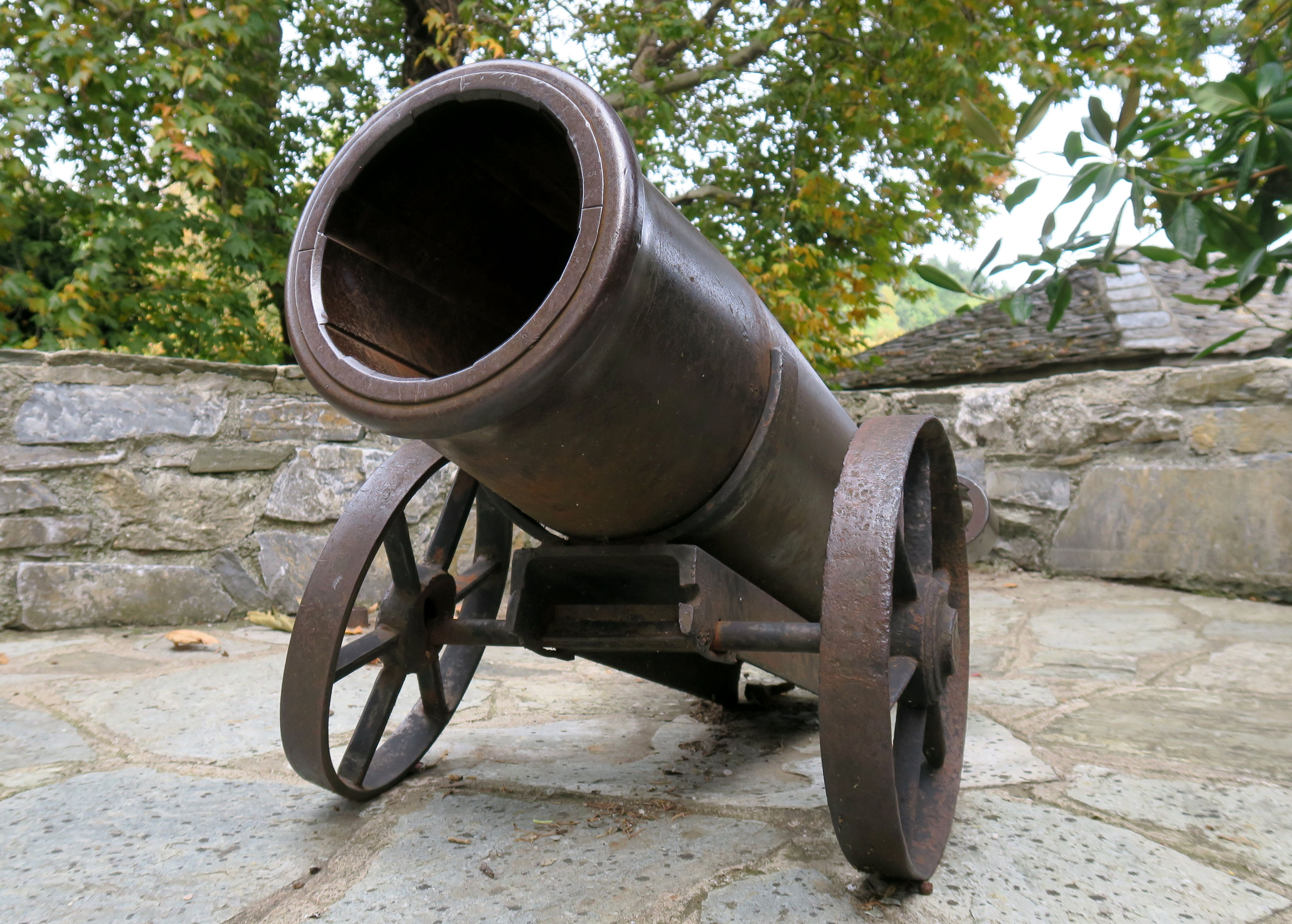
Remnants of a 25 cm schwerer Minenwerfer in Kissos (Pelion, Greece). The carriage was improvised locally.

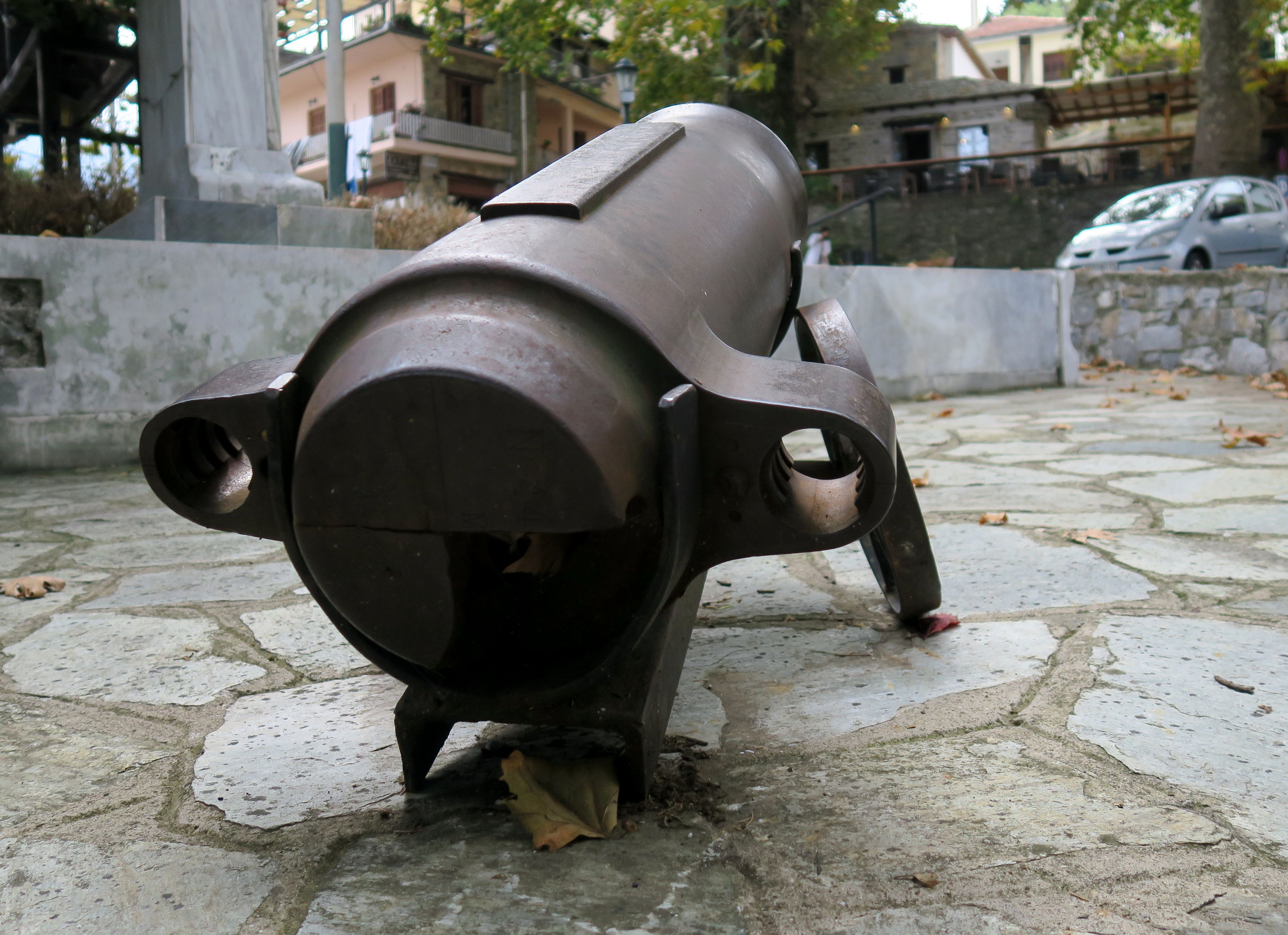
Remnants of a 25 cm schwerer Minenwerfer in Kissos (Pelion, Greece) Rear view.

== See also ==
- Minenwerfer

=== Comparable weapons ===
- Mortier de 240 mm French equivalent
- 9.45 inch Heavy Mortar British equivalent
