= 10 cm Gebirgshaubitze M 99 =

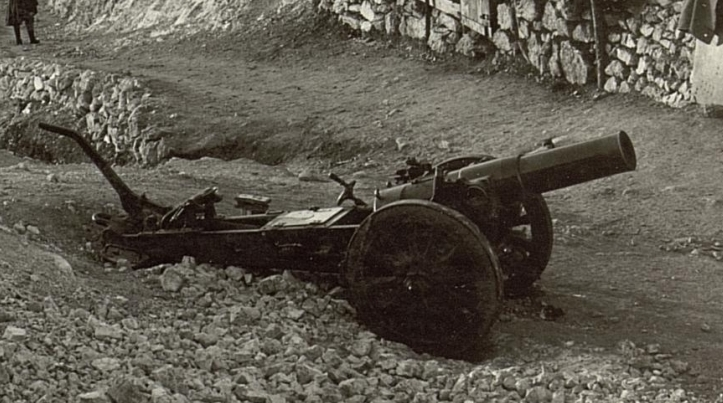
- Type: Mountain howitzer
- Place of origin: Austria-Hungary

Service history
- Used by: Austria-Hungary
- Wars: World War I

Production history
- Designed: 1899

Specifications
- Mass: 1,022 kg (2,253 lb)
- Width: 90 cm (35 in)
- Shell: 14.3 kg (32 lb)
- Caliber: 104 mm (4.1 in)
- Breech: Eccentric screw
- Carriage: Box trail
- Muzzle velocity: 305 m/s (1,000 ft/s)
- Maximum firing range: 6,100 m (6,700 yd)?

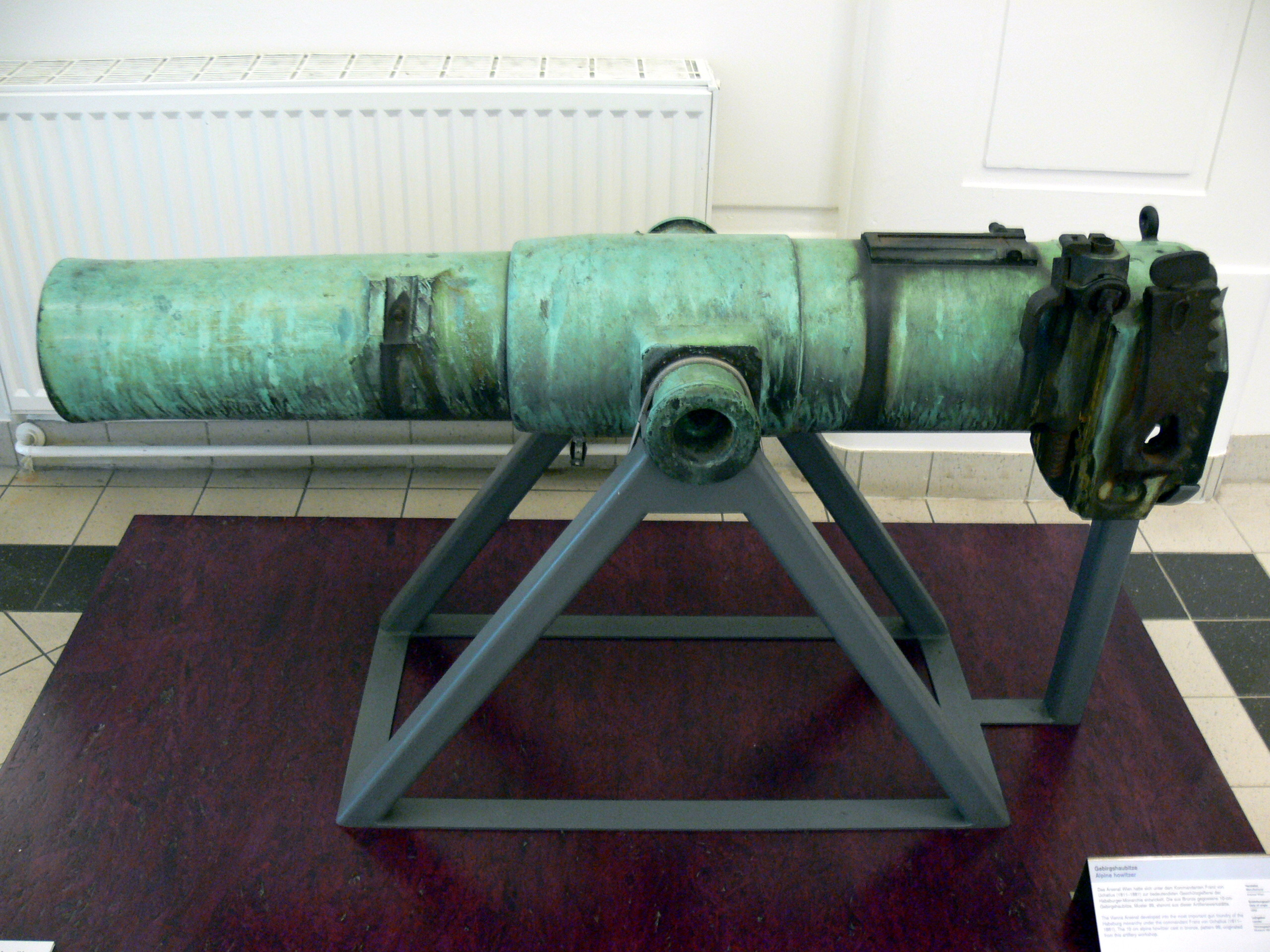
A 10 cm Gebirgshaubitze M99 barrel at Technical Museum Vienna

The 10 cm Gebirgshaubitze M 99 was a mountain howitzer used by Austria-Hungary during World War I.

It consisted of a barrel of the 10 cm Feldhaubitze M 99 made from the so-called steel bronze (92% copper bronze strengthened by autofrettage which was used due to the lack of steel industry in Austria, see Franz von Uchatius) on a new, narrow-gauge box trail carriage that could be broken down for transport on animal carts. Like its brother, it lacked a modern recoil system, using only an ineffective spring-mounted recoil spade, and was virtually obsolescent upon its introduction. Relatively few were made as the version of the standard 10 cm Feldhaubitze M 99 with a narrow, 1.3-metre (51 in) carriage was cheaper.

== Bibliography ==
- Ortner, M. Christian. The Austro-Hungarian Artillery From 1867 to 1918: Technology, Organization, and Tactics. Vienna, Verlag Militaria, 2007 ISBN 978-3-902526-13-7
