= List of German weapons of World War I =

This is a list of German weapons of World War I.

== Infantry weapons ==
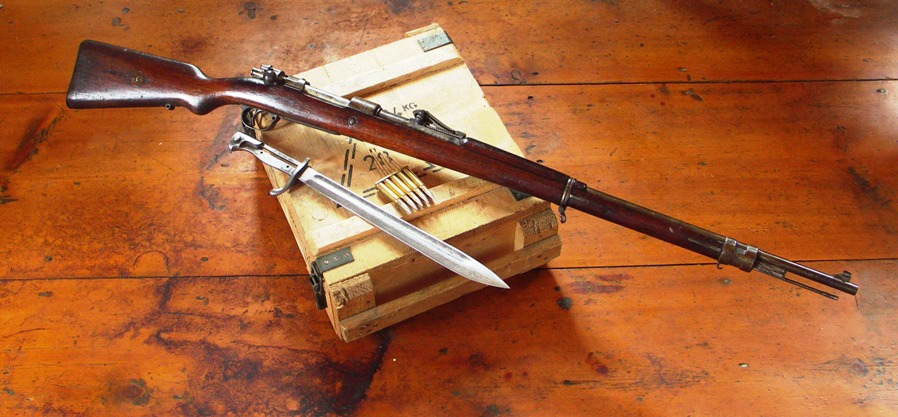
Mauser Gewehr 98 and bayonet

- Bayard M1908 (semi-automatic pistol)
- Beholla M1915 (semi-automatic pistol)
- Bergmann–Bayard M1910 (semi-automatic pistol)
- Bergmann MP 18-I (submachine gun)
- Dreyse M1907 (semi-automatic pistol)
- Flachmine 17 (anti-tank mine)
- Frommer M1912 Stop (pistol)
- GRC Gewehr 88/05, Gewehr 88/14, Gewehr 91 and Karabiner 88 (carbine and rifle)
- Hebel M1894 (flare gun)
- Lance
- Langenhan M1914 Selbstlader (semi-automatic pistol)
- Luger P04 and P08 (pistol)
- M1873 Artilleriesäbel (sword)
- M1889 Infanteriesäbel (sword)
- M1913 Karabingranate (carbine grenade)
- M1914 Karabingranate (carbine grenade)
- M1917 Karabingranate (carbine grenade)
- M1913 Kugelhandgranate (hand grenade)
- M1915 Kugelhandgranate NA (hand grenade)
- M1915 Diskushandgranate (offensive version and defensive version hand grenade)
- M1915, M1916 and M1917 Stielhandgranate (hand stickgrenade)
- M1917 Eierhandgranate (hand grenade)
- Mauser C78 and C86 Zig-Zag (revolver)
- Mauser C96 (semi-automatic pistol)
- Mauser Gewehr 71 and 71/84 (rifle)
- Mauser Gewehr 98 (rifle)
- Mauser Karabiner 98A (carbine version of the Mauser Gewehr 98 rifle)
- Mauser M1887 (rifle)
- Mauser M1910 and M1914 (semi-automatic pistol)
- Mauser M1915 and M1916 Selbstlader (semi-automatic rifle)
- Mondragón M1908 (semi-automatic rifle)
- Reichsrevolver M1879 and M1883
- Schwarzlose M1908 (semi-automatic pistol)
- Seitengewehr 84/98 III (bayonet)
- Seitengewehr 98/05 (bayonet)
- Steyr M1912 (semi-automatic pistol)
- Walther Model 4 (semi-automatic gun, also known as vest gun)
- Werder M1869 (rifle)

== Machine guns ==
- Bergmann MG 15 (water cooled version heavy machine gun)
- Bergmann MG 15nA (air cooled version light machine gun)
- Gast M1917
- Madsen M1902
- Maxim machine gun
- MG 18 TuF (heavy anti-tank and anti-aircraft machine gun)
- MG 99, MG 01, MG 08, MG 08/15, MG 08/18 and MG 09
- Parabellum MG 14 and MG 14/17 (lightweight redesign of the MG 08)
- Schmeisser-Dreyse MG 12, MG 15 and MG 18

== Special weapons ==
- 7.58 cm M1914 leicht Minenwerfer
- 7.62 cm Infanteriegeschütz L/16.5
- 7.7 cm Infanteriegeschütz L/20
- 7.7 cm Infanteriegeschütz L/27
- 17 cm M1913 mittler Minenwerfer
- 25 cm M1910 schwer Minenwerfer
- Albrecht 24 cm M1917 schwer Flügelminenwerfer
- Albrecht 25 cm M1916 schwer Minenwerfer
- Becker 2 cm M2 (anti-tank and anti-aircraft gun)
- Ehrhardt 24 cm M1915 schwer Ladungswerfer
- Flammenwerfer M1916
- Granatenwerfer 16
- Grossflammenwerfer M1911
- IKO 24 cm M1917 schwer Flügelminenwerfer
- Kleinflammenwerfer M1911
- Lanz 9.15 cm M1914 leicht Minenwerfer
- Mauser 1.3 cm M1918 Tankgewehr (anti-tank rifle)
- Sauterelle (grenade launching crossbow captured from the French)
- Wechselapparat Flammenwerfer M1917

== Artillery ==
- 6 cm S-Bts K L/21 (landing gun)
- 7.5 cm Gebirgskanone L/13 C/80 (mountain gun)
- 7.5 cm Gebirgskanone L/14 M1913 (mountain gun)
- 7.5 cm Gebirgskanone L/17 M.08 (mountain gun)
- 7.62 cm FlaK L/30 (anti-aircraft gun)
- 7.7 cm FlaK L/27 (anti-aircraft gun)
- 7.7 cm FlaK L/35 (anti-aircraft gun)
- 7.7 cm FK 96 (field gun)
- 7.7 cm FK 96 n.A. (field gun)
- 7.7 cm FK 16 (field gun)
- 7.7 cm Kanone in Haubitzelafette (field gun on howitzer carriage)
- 8 cm Kanone C/73
- 8 cm Kanone C/80
- 8.8 cm Flak 16 (anti-aircraft gun)
- 9 cm Kanone C/73
- 9 cm Kanone C/79
- 10 cm K 04
- 10 cm K 14
- 10 cm K 17
- 10.5 cm Feldhaubitze 98/09 (field howitzer)
- 10.5 cm Gebirgshaubitze L/12 (mountain gun)
- 10.5 cm leFH 16 (light field howitzer)
- 12 cm Kanone C/80
- 13.5 cm K 09
- 15 cm Kanone 16
- 15 cm L/40 Feldkanone i.R. (field gun)
- 15 cm Ring Kanone C/72
- 15 cm Ring Kanone C/92
- 15 cm Ring Kanone L/30
- 15 cm sFH 93 (heavy field howitzer)
- 15 cm sFH 02 (heavy field howitzer)
- 15 cm sFH 13 (heavy field howitzer)
- 15 cm SK "Nathan"
- 17 cm SK L/40 i.R.L. auf Eisenbahnwagen
- 21 cm L/14.5 Mörser 16 (mortar)
- 21 cm Mörser 10 (mortar)
- 21 cm Mörser 99 (mortar)
- 21 cm SK "Peter Adalbert"
- 21 cm Versuchmörser 06 (mortar)
- 24 cm SK L/30 "Theodor Otto"
- 24 cm SK L/40 "Theodor Karl"
- 28 cm Haubitze L/12 (howitzer)
- 28 cm Haubitze L/14 i.R. (howitzer)
- 28 cm K L/40 "Kurfürst" (six 28 cm MRK L/40 naval guns were converted to railway guns)
- 28 cm SK L/40 "Bruno" (28 cm SK L/40 gun naval guns were converted to railway guns)
- 38 cm SK L/45 "Max" (long range coast-defence gun and siege gun)
- 42 cm Gamma Mörser (siege gun)
- 42 cm kurze MK 14 L/12 (siege gun, also known as "Bertha")
- Ehrhardt 7.5 cm Model 1904 (mountain gun)
- Gruson 5.3cm L/24 Fahrpanzer (mobile artillery turret)
- Krupp 3.7 cm L/14.5 Sockelflugzeugabwehrkanone (anti-aircraft gun)
- Krupp 7.5 cm Model 1903 (field gun)
- Paris Gun (also known as 21 cm "Wilhelm")
- Rheinmetall 3.7 cm M1918 Tankabwehrkanone (anti-tank gun)

== Other vehicles ==
- A7V Flakpanzer 1918 (anti-aircraft tank)
- A7V Schutzengrabenbagger 1918 (trench digger)
- A7V Sturmpanzerwagen 1917 (heavy tank)
- A7V Uberlandwagen 1917 (supply carrier)
- Benz-SAG BL10 panzerkraftwagen 1912 (armored truck)
- Büssing A5P 1915 (armored car)
- Bussing Kraftzugwagen KZW 1800 1916 (gun carrier)
- Daimler Marienfelde ALZ 13 1913 (supply truck)
- Daimler Marienwagen II halbspur 1916 (supply halftrack)
- Daimler Marienwagen II gepanzerter halbspur 1917 (armored halftrack)
- Daimler Marienwagen II tankabwehrkanone 1918 (anti-tank halftrack)
- Daimler Panzerautomobil 1915 (armored car)
- Duhrkopp (Dur) Wagen 1916 (supply carrier)
- Ehrhardt E-V/4 (early version 1915 and late version 1917 armored car)
- Ehrhardt Gepanzerter triebwagen 1917 (armored railcar)
- Lanz Gleiskettenschlepper 1918 (supply carrier)
- Leicht kampfwagen II 1918 (light tank that was rarely used conducting escorts and never saw combat)
- Mannesmann Motoren und Lastwagen AG panzerkraftwagen 1916 (armored truck)
- Nacke 3.5t 1913 (supply truck)
- Nacke 5t 1915 (supply truck)
- NSU 3 1.2 PS 1914 (sidecar motorcycle)
- Opel 4t 1915 (supply truck)
- Porsche Generatorzugwagen 1916 (gun carrier)

== Ships ==
- A class torpedo boat
- List of ships of the Imperial German Navy

== Submarines ==
- List of German U-boats#World War I–era U-boats

== Airships ==
- Gross-Basenach M-IV
- Parseval PL-19
- Parseval PL-25
- List of Schütte-Lanz airships
- List of Zeppelin airships

== Airplanes ==
Note that those airplanes were mainly used.

- AEG C.IV
- AEG G.II
- AGO C.I
- Albatros C.III
- Albatros D.II
- Albatros D.III
- Albatros D.V
- Albatros G.III
- Albatros W.4
- Aviatik C.I
- Aviatik D.I
- DFW C.V
- DFW R.I
- Fokker E.I
- Fokker E.II
- Fokker E.III
- Fokker E.IV
- Fokker D.VII
- Fokker D.VIII (also known as E.V)
- Fokker Dr.I (also known as F.I)
- Friedrichshafen G.III
- Gotha G.IV
- Junkers D.I (also known as J9)
- Junkers J.I (also known as J4)
- Halberstadt CL.II
- Halberstadt D.II
- Hannover CL.III
- LFG Roland C.II
- LFG Roland D.II
- LVG C.V
- Pfalz D.III
- Pfalz D.XII
- Rumpler C.IV
- Rumpler G.I
- Siemens-Schuckert SSW R.I
- Zeppelin-Dornier RS.III
- Zeppelin-Staaken R.VI
