= 10 cm K 17 =

10 cm Kanone 17
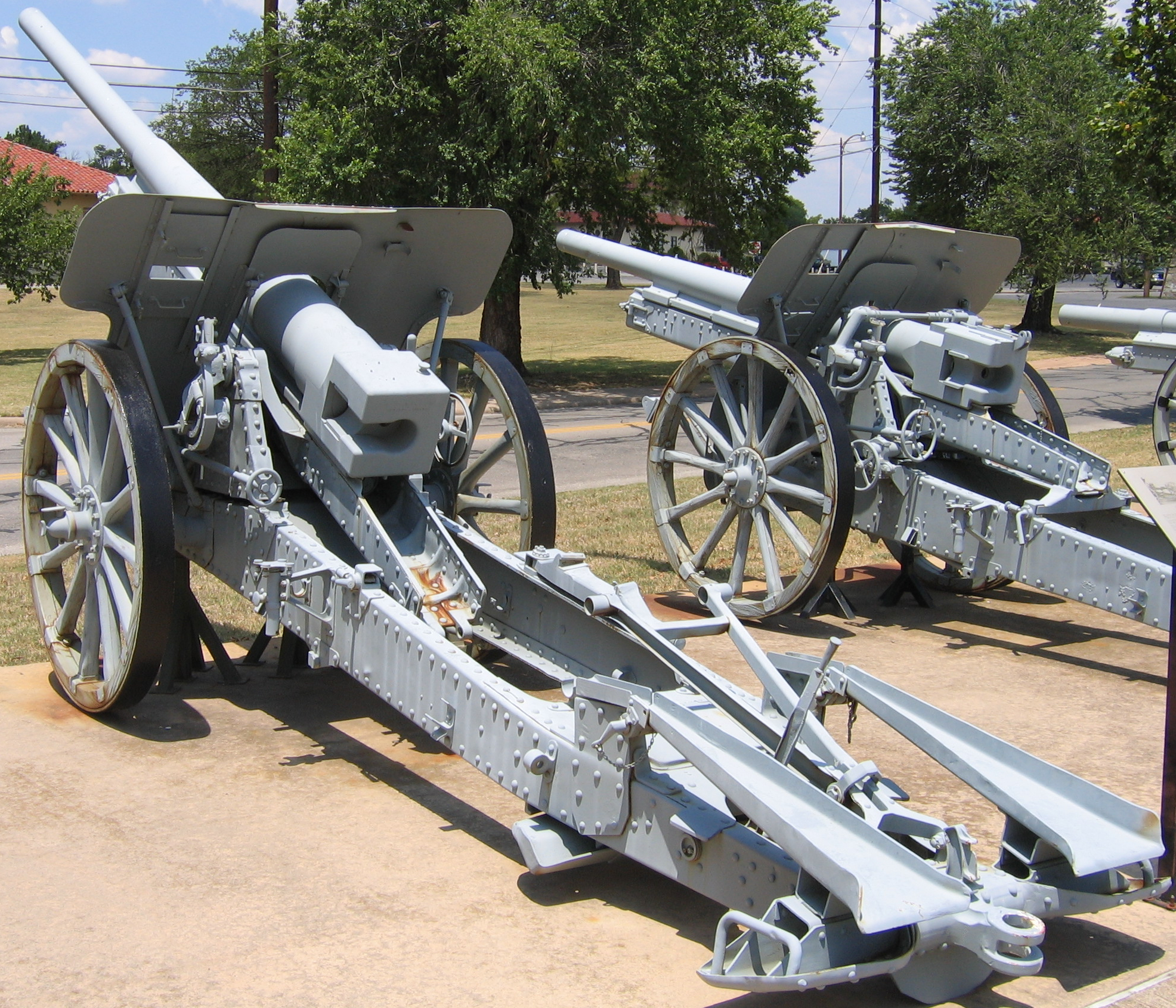
- A K 17 at the US Army Field Artillery Museum, Ft. Sill, OK
- Type: Field gun
- Place of origin: German Empire

Service history
- In service: 1917–45
- Used by: Austria; German Empire; Nazi Germany; Romania; Sweden
- Wars: World War I World War II

Production history
- Designer: Krupp
- Designed: 1916
- Manufacturer: Krupp
- Produced: 1917–18
- No. built: 192
- Variants: 10 cm Kanone 17/04

Specifications
- Mass: 3,300 kg (7,275 lbs)
- Length: 4.725 m (15 ft 6 in)
- Barrel length: 2.036 m (6 ft 8 in) L/45
- Shell: 105 x 504 mmR separate-loading, cased charge
- Shell weight: 18.5 kg (40 lb 13 oz)
- Caliber: 105 mm (4.13 in)
- Breech: Horizontal sliding-block
- Recoil: Hydro-pneumatic or hydro-spring
- Carriage: Box trail
- Elevation: -2° to +45°
- Traverse: 6°
- Muzzle velocity: 650 m/s (2,132 ft/s)
- Maximum firing range: 16,500 m (18,045 yds)

The 10 cm Kanone 17 (10 cm K 17) was a field gun used by Germany in World War I and World War II.

== Development ==
The range of the 10 cm K 14 was deemed insufficient in combat and Krupp designed a new, longer (L/45) barrel that was mounted on the K 14's carriage. This made the gun too heavy to be transported as a single load; the barrel had to be removed and stowed on its own transport wagon. The ramps visible in the picture (see right), served to guide the barrel transport wagon into position to align the barrel with the recoil system to allow it to be winched into battery. They are fixed in place on this example, but were generally removable.

The K 17 used either a hydro-pneumatic or hydro spring recoil system, presumably depending on manufacturer.

== Anti-aircraft role ==
Despite the recognition that the K 17 would not have any anti-aircraft role, most of the heavy and expensive features added to the K 14 in a failed bid to equip it as an AA gun were retained. Presumably this was to hasten the switchover from production of the K 14 to the K 17. A simpler version of the K 17 was designed in 1917 that harkened back to the K 04 in many ways. The complex sighting system was dropped in favor of one based on the sights used on the 15 cm sFH 13, variable recoil was deleted and the gun could not be broken down for transport. This was called the K 17/04; about a thousand were ordered in August 1917.

== Counter battery gun ==
Because of its perceived value as an anti-aircraft weapon, the gun was a difficult piece to manufacture. Despite a few K 04s shooting down balloons during the war, these weapons never fulfilled a useful air defense niche. In 1914, few active army corps had heavy guns within their organization. These pieces were often found in reserve units. By 1918, all corps incorporated heavy guns. A Foot Artillery Battalion was typically organized with two howitzer batteries and one heavy gun battery. Overall it appears that the 10 cm guns did find useful service. They served as an excellent long-range counter battery weapon and were more than passable as an anti-personnel weapon. They were well paired with the 15 cm guns, which more commonly served in the anti-personnel role.

== Fate ==
Germany was forbidden to use these guns by the Versailles Treaty and was supposed to scrap or sell all existing weapons. Some were sold to Sweden and Romania after the war, but some were hidden and saw service in World War II, mainly in the coastal defense role. Here the Kanone 1917 and K 17/04 soldiered on along with the 10 cm Kanone 1918, these three most modern types saw excellent service throughout World War II.
