= 8 cm Kanone C/73 =

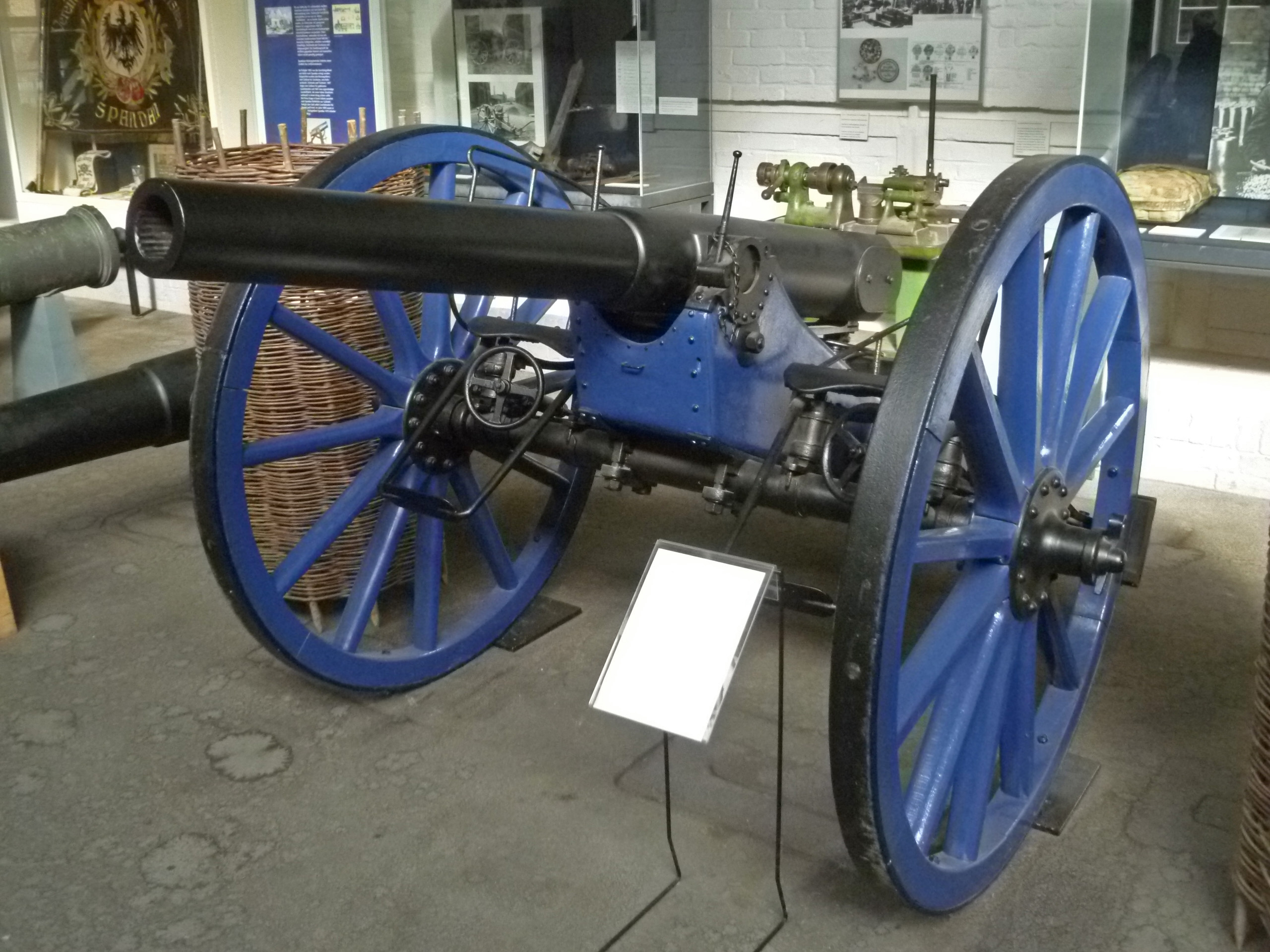
- An 8 cm Kanone C/73 at the Spandau Citadel.
- Type: Field gun
- Place of origin: German Empire

Service history
- In service: 1873−1922
- Used by: See users
- Wars: See wars

Production history
- Designer: Krupp
- Designed: 1873
- Manufacturer: Krupp
- Produced: 1873−1891

Specifications
- Mass: 750 kg (1,650 lb)
- Barrel length: 1.57 m (5 ft 2 in) L/20
- Shell: Separate-loading, bagged charges and projectiles
- Shell weight: Canister: 3.5 kg (7 lb 11 oz); Common: 4.2 kg (9 lb 4 oz); Shrapnel: 4.7 kg (10 lb 6 oz)
- Caliber: 78.5 mm (3.09 in)
- Breech: Horizontal sliding-block
- Recoil: None
- Carriage: Box trail
- Elevation: +8° to +24°
- Traverse: None
- Rate of fire: 10 rpm
- Muzzle velocity: 400 m/s (1,300 ft/s)
- Effective firing range: 4.8 km (3 mi)

The 8 cm Kanone C/73 was a field gun developed after the Franco-Prussian War and used by Germany before and during World War I.

== History ==
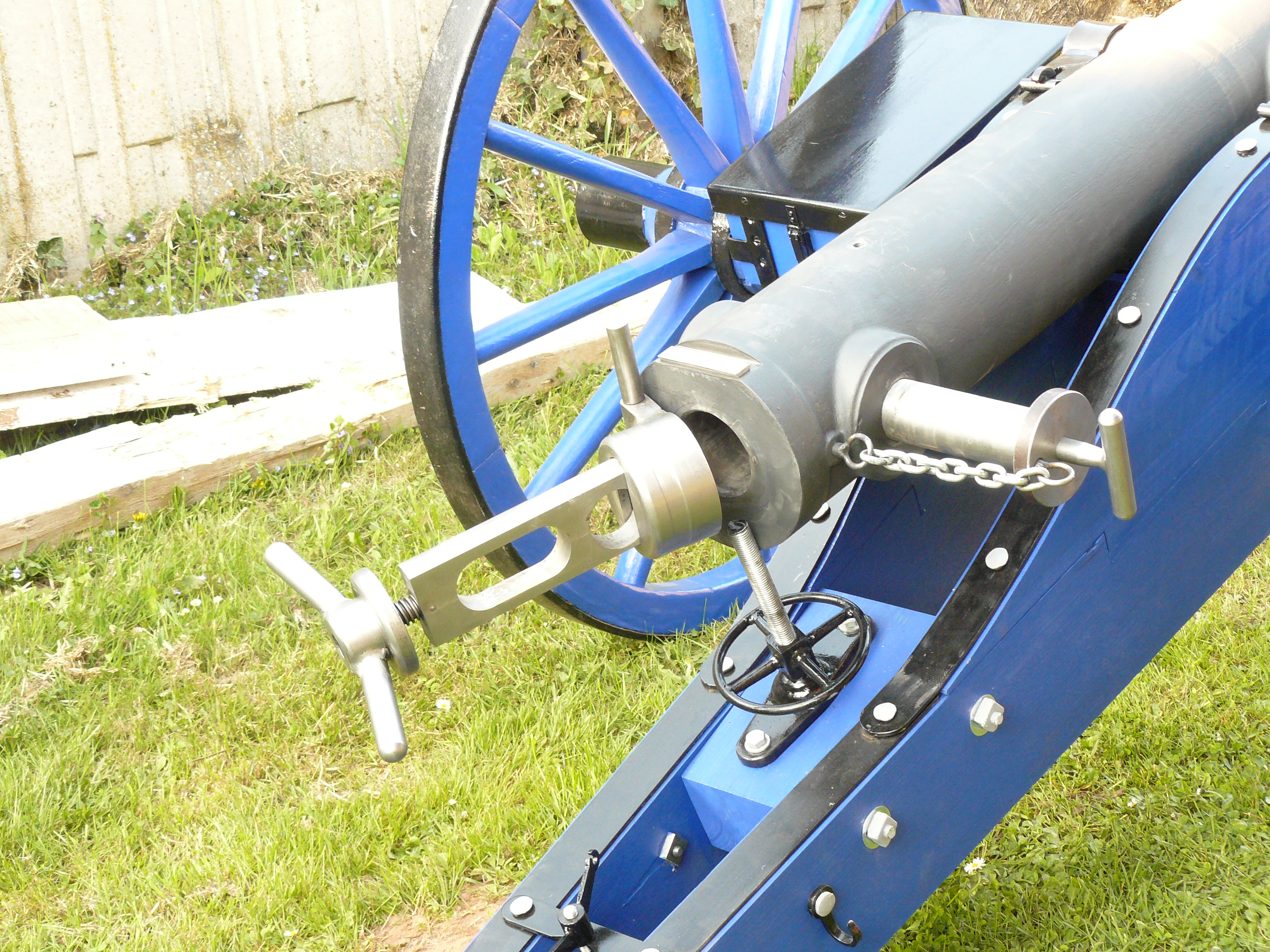
The Wahrendorff breech of the C/61.

After the Franco-Prussian War, the German Army began to study replacements for its existing C/61 steel breech-loaded cannons. Although the C/61 had outclassed its bronze muzzle-loaded French rivals during the war its Wahrendorff breech was unpopular with gun crews. The new gun designated the C/73 would retain the same 78.5 mm (3.09 in) caliber of the C/61 and would equip cavalry artillery regiments. The German and Austro-Hungarian Army during that period rounded up to the nearest centimeter.

In addition to the German Army, C/73's also armed the Ottoman Empire and a number of the Balkan states. The Balkan states either bought them from Germany, built them under license or inherited Ottoman guns after they left the region. Although largely replaced by the German Army before the First World War a combination of higher than expected losses and insufficient ammunition production led to the C/73 being brought out of reserve and issued as replacements to artillery regiments.

== Design ==
Although made of steel like its predecessor the C/73 was of built-up construction with a central rifled tube, a reinforcing hoop from the trunnions to the breech and a larger propellant chamber for higher muzzle velocities and greater range. The C/73 featured a new breech which was known as a cylindro-prismatic breech that was a predecessor of Krupp's horizontal sliding-block and the gun used separate-loading, bagged charges and projectiles. Since the C/73 had limited elevation +8° to +24° it was a direct fire weapon meant to fire on infantry in the open and the most common types of shells were canister, common and shrapnel.

The C/73 had a box trail carriage built from bolted steel plates instead of wood. The C/73 did not have a recoil mechanism or a gun shield. For transport, the gun was attached to a limber for towing by a six-horse team. The limber also had seats for crew members plus ammunition and supplies. There were also seats attached to the axle of the gun carriage for the crew.

== Users ==
- German Empire
- Albania
- Kingdom of Bulgaria
- Kingdom of Greece
- Kingdom of Montenegro
- Ottoman Empire
- Kingdom of Romania
- Kingdom of Serbia

== Wars ==
- Russo-Turkish War
- First Boer War
- Greco-Turkish War (1897)
- Second Boer War
- Boxer Rebellion
- Herero Wars
- Italo-Turkish War
- Balkan Wars
- World War I
- Greco-Turkish War (1919–1922)

== Photo Gallery ==
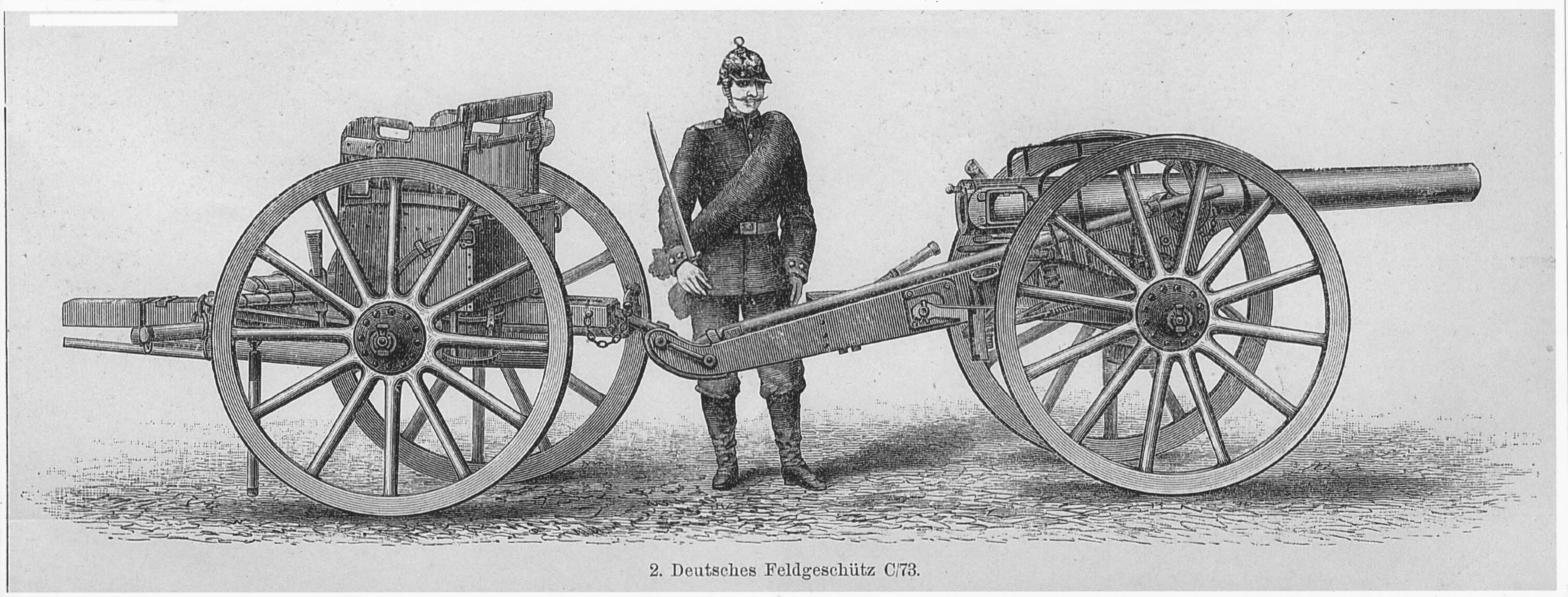
A C/73 with limber.

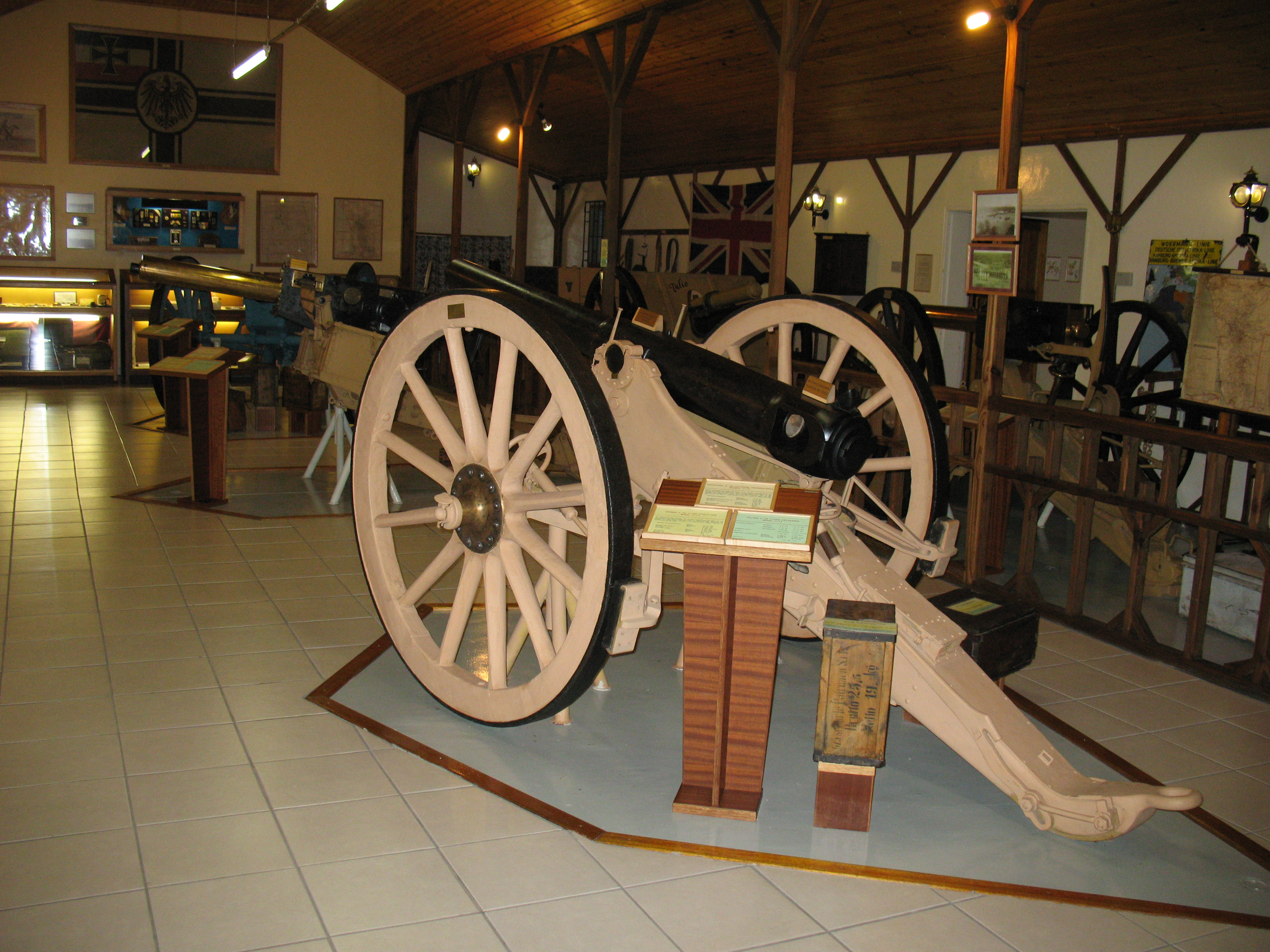
A C/73 at the Tsumeb Museum, Namibia.

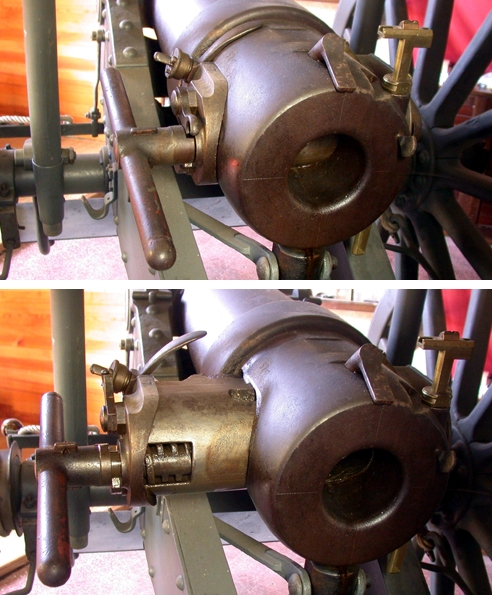
The breech of an early Krupp gun.

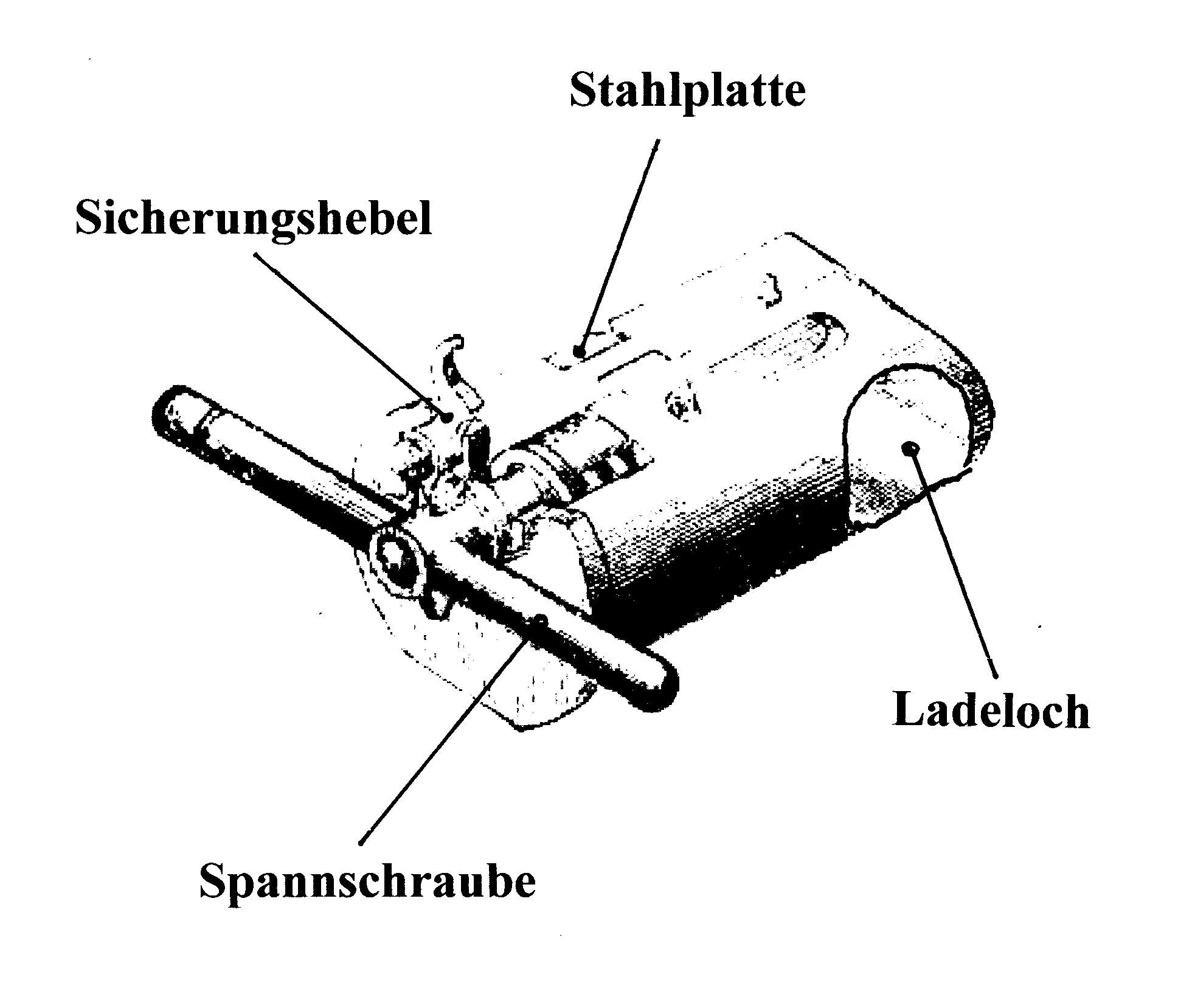
The breech block of the C/73.
