= 17 cm SK L/40 i.R.L. auf Eisenbahnwagen =

17 cm SK L/40 i.R.L. auf Eisenbahnwagen "Samuel"
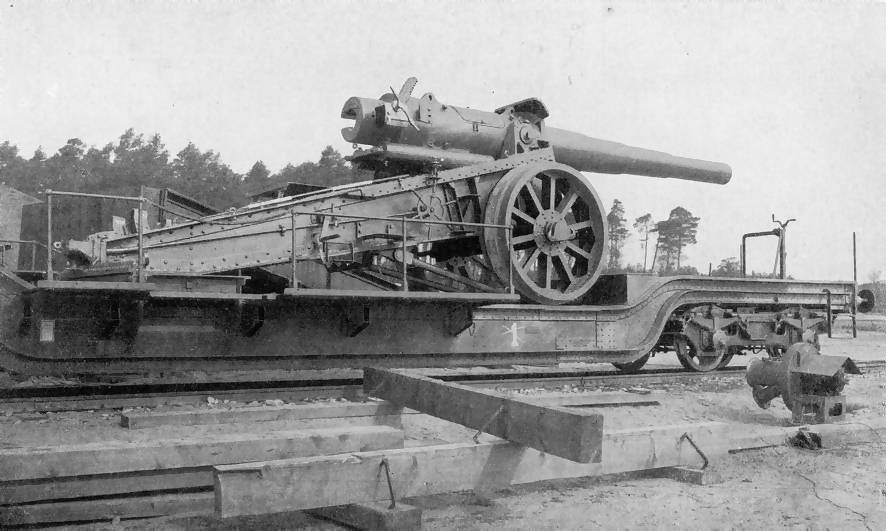
- side view of a captured weapon
- Type: Railway Gun
- Place of origin: German Empire

Service history
- In service: 1917−1940
- Used by: German Empire; Belgium
- Wars: World War I World War II

Production history
- Designer: Krupp
- Manufacturer: Krupp
- Produced: 1916−1918
- Variants: 17 cm SK L/40 i.R.L.

Specifications
- Mass: 61.5 t (60.5 long tons; 67.8 short tons)
- Length: 16.75 m (54 ft 11 in)
- Barrel length: 6.9 m (22 ft 8 in)
- Shell: semi-fixed
- Caliber: 172.6 mm (6.80 in)
- Breech: horizontal sliding-wedge
- Recoil: hydro-spring
- Carriage: 2 × 2-axle trucks
- Elevation: +0° to 45°
- Traverse: 26°
- Rate of fire: 1 rpm
- Muzzle velocity: 785 to 815 m/s (2,580 to 2,670 ft/s)
- Maximum firing range: 24,020 m (26,270 yd)

The 17 cm SK L/40 i.R.L. auf Eisenbahnwagen "Samuel" (SK - Schnelladekanone (quick-loading cannon), L/40 - Länge (40 caliber barrel), i.R.L. - in Räder-Lafette (on wheeled carriage) auf Eisenbahnwagen (on railroad car)) was a railroad gun used by the Imperial German Army in World War I.

== Design and history ==
These guns, the 17 cm SK L/40 gun, were designed as the secondary armament of the Braunschweig- and Deutschland-class pre-dreadnoughts, but they were transferred to the Army from the Navy (Kaiserliche Marine) when those ships began to be relegated to training duties in 1916. It was first adapted for land use by mounting it on an improvised carriage as the 17 cm SK L/40 i.R.L., but it proved to be extremely heavy, often too heavy to be moved by horse, even after being broken down into three loads.

The solution was to mount the guns, still on their carriages, on rail cars to increase their strategic mobility. The gun's firing platform (Bettungslafette) was used as a model for the mount on the rail car. A metal ring was fixed to the surface of the car on which the wheels rested. At the center of this ring was a large pivot pin from which tension rods extended to the carriage's trail which rested against a circular section of rail. The gun was traversed by means of a gear that engaged pins on the outside of the rail. The trail rested on two spring-supported rollers, which would compress during firing and allow the shock of recoil to be transmitted to the floor of the car. To prevent damage to the trucks during firing cast-steel wedges were placed on the railroad ties under matching wedges on the car and the car was moved up on them. Some sources quote its maximum elevation as 47.5°, but Miller says that the sight on the gun itself was only calibrated to 45°. If more traverse was needed the gun's original firing platform was carried on a separate car and the gun could be dismounted to use it.

=== Ammunition ===
The shells for this gun were loaded by two men using a tray. It had eyes which engaged hooks on the breech of the gun and then the shell and powder was manually rammed. It used the German naval system of ammunition, where the base charge was held in a metallic cartridge case and supplemented by another charge in a silk bag that was rammed first.

Shell name	Weight	Filling Weight	Muzzle velocity	Range
nose-fused high-explosive shell (Sprenggranate) L/3 Kz.	64 kg (141 lb)	3.4 kg (7.5 lb) (HE)	785 m/s (2,580 ft/s)	16,900 m (18,500 yd)
nose-fused high-explosive shell with ballistic cap (Sprenggranate) L/4.7 Kz. (mit Haube)	62.8 kg (138 lb)	6.5 kg (14 lb) (HE)	815 m/s (2,670 ft/s)	24,020 m (26,270 yd)

== Combat History ==
Thirty saw service on the Western Front beginning in 1917. They were organized into fifteen batteries, manned by the Army (Heer), each with two guns. Batteries 423, 462, 478, 521, 536, 551, 642, and 797 have been identified. Eight participated in the 1918 German spring offensive. Six guns were captured in Belgium and two others were captured by the French Army in October 1918. Another fourteen were found after the Armistice. Fourteen of these were destroyed in 1922 by the Military Inter-Allied Commission of Control. Around a dozen surviving guns entered service with the Belgian Army, and saw action during the German invasion in May 1940.

== Gallery ==
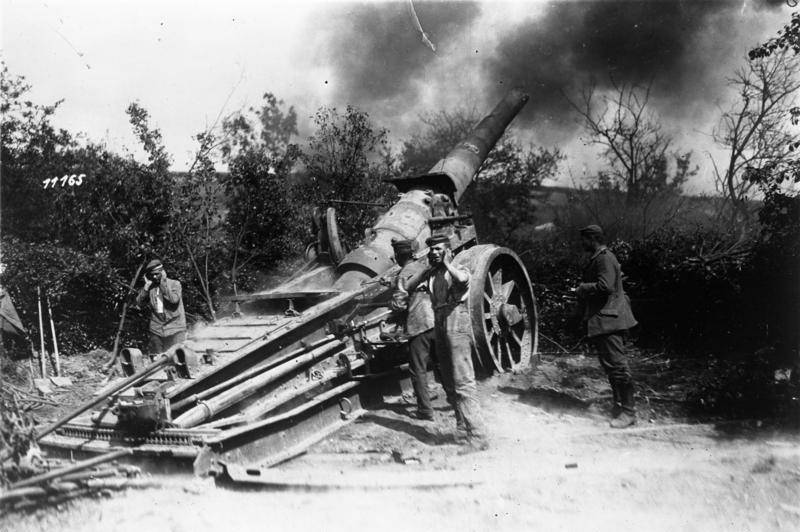
A 17 cm SK L/40 in action near the Marne

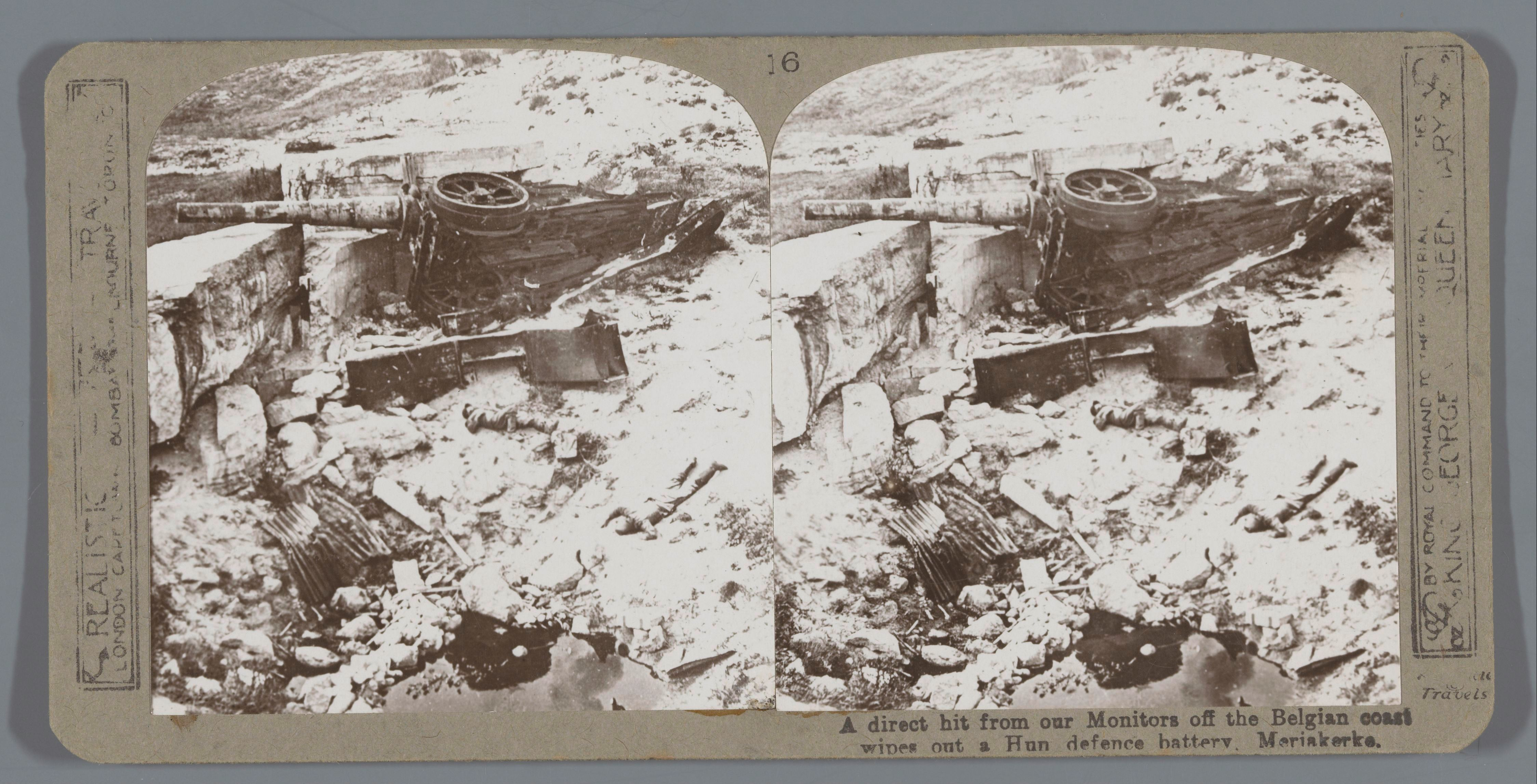
A coastal defense 17 cm SK L/40 knocked out by British monitors in Flanders

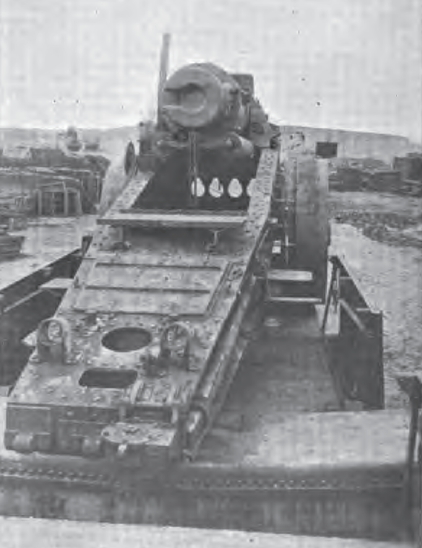
A rear view of a damaged gun showing the traversing rail

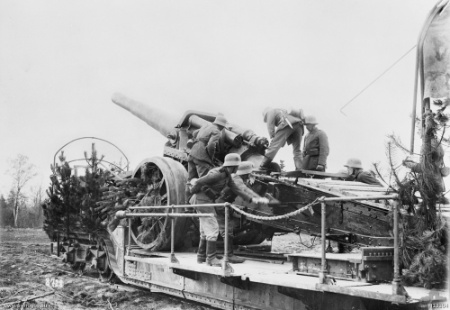
Laying the gun before firing, France 1918

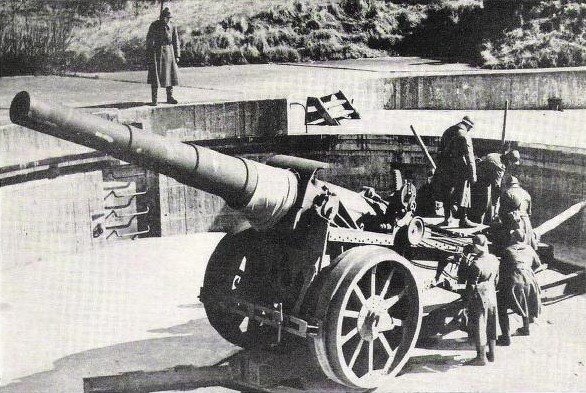
A Belgian coastal defense 17 cm SK L/40 during World War II
