= 12 cm Kanone C/80 =

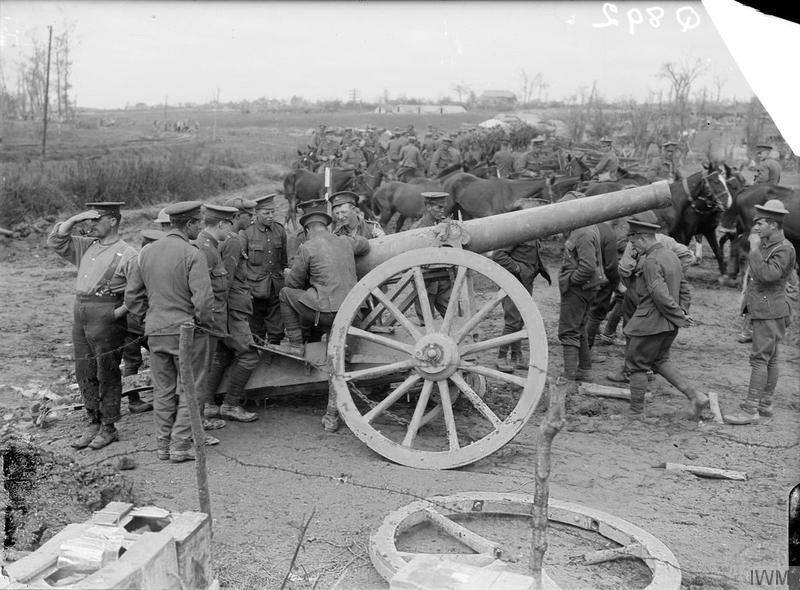
- A C/79 or C/80 captured at the Battle of the Somme.
- Type: Fortress gun Siege gun
- Place of origin: German Empire

Service history
- In service: 1880−1918
- Used by: German Empire
- Wars: World War I

Production history
- Designer: Krupp
- Designed: 1880
- Manufacturer: Krupp
- Produced: 1880−1891
- No. built: 620

Specifications
- Mass: Travel: 4,675 kg (10,307 lb); Combat: 2,455 kg (5,412 lb)
- Barrel length: 2.8 m (9 ft 2 in) L/23.4
- Shell: Separate-loading, bagged charges and projectiles
- Shell weight: 17 kg (37 lb 8 oz)
- Caliber: 120.3 mm (4.74 in)
- Breech: Horizontal sliding-block
- Recoil: None
- Carriage: Box trail
- Elevation: -5° to +40°
- Rate of fire: 2 rpm
- Muzzle velocity: 442 m/s (1,450 ft/s)
- Maximum firing range: 7.9 km (4.9 mi)

The 12 cm Kanone C/80 was a fortress and siege gun developed after the Franco-Prussian War and used by Germany before and during World War I.

== History ==
After the Franco-Prussian War, the Army began to study replacements for its 12 cm Kanone C/64 breech loaded cannons. Although Prussian artillery had outclassed their French rivals during the war the breech mechanism they used was weak and there was a tendency for barrels to burst due to premature detonation of shells. In 1873 a new gun which retained the same 120.3 mm (4.74 in) caliber as the previous gun and designated the 12 cm Kanone C/73 was introduced to replace the C/64 but it had poor range so it was quickly replaced. The new gun designated the 12 cm Kanone C/80 was assigned to fortress and siege artillery regiments of the Army.

== Design ==
During the Franco-Prussian war, large numbers of French bronze cannons were captured and this material was melted down and used to build the new 12 cm Kanone C/80 and the smaller 9 cm Kanone C/79. The C/80 would use the same rounded breech block introduced on the C/73 to avoid the stress fractures which caused catastrophic failures in the square blocked C/64. This type of breech was known as a cylindro-prismatic breech which was a predecessor of Krupp's horizontal sliding-block and the gun used separate-loading, bagged charges and projectiles.

The C/80 was fairly conventional for its time and most nations had similar guns such as its Russian cousin the 42-line fortress and siege gun Pattern of 1877 or its French rival the Canon de 120 mm modèle 1878. Like many of its contemporaries, the C/80 had a tall and narrow box trail carriage built from bolted iron plates with two wooden 12-spoke wheels. The carriages were tall because the guns were designed to sit behind a parapet with the barrel overhanging the front in the fortress artillery role or behind a trench or berm in the siege role. Like many of its contemporaries, the C/80's carriage did not have a recoil mechanism or a gun shield. However, when used in a fortress the guns could be connected to an external recoil mechanism which connected to a steel eye on a concrete firing platform and a hook on the carriage between the wheels. For siege gun use a wooden firing platform could be assembled ahead of time and the guns could attach to the same type of recoil mechanism. A set of wooden ramps were also placed behind the wheels and when the gun fired the wheels rolled up the ramp and was returned to position by gravity. There was also no traverse so the gun had to be levered into position to aim. A drawback of this system was the gun had to be re-aimed each time which lowered the rate of fire. For transport, the gun was attached to a limber for towing by a horse team or artillery tractor.

== World War I ==
The majority of military planners before the First World War were wedded to the concept of fighting an offensive war of rapid maneuver which in a time before mechanization meant a focus on cavalry and light horse artillery firing shrapnel shells. Since the C/80 was heavier and wasn't designed with field use in mind it was employed as a fortress gun. However, once the Western Front stagnated and trench warfare set in fortresses, armories, coastal fortifications, and museums were scoured for artillery to send to the front. A combination of factors led the Germans to issue C/80's to their troops as replacements.

These included:

- An underestimation of light field artillery losses during the first two years of the war and an inadequate number of replacement guns being produced.
- An underestimation of ammunition consumption, inadequate production capacity, and resulting shortages.
- Since C/80's had been relegated to garrison duty there were fairly large numbers of them still in service, since there was not another gun that used the same ammunition there was an adequate stockpile of ammunition.
- Existing light field guns weren't tall enough to fire over the edge of trenches and their carriages weren't capable of high-angles of fire which meant that despite having gun shields their crews were vulnerable to counter-battery fire. Also, many light artillery pieces didn't have the range necessary to be used in an indirect-fire role.

Although new guns with superior performance were introduced the C/80 remained in service until the end of the war due to the sheer number in service.

== Photo Gallery ==
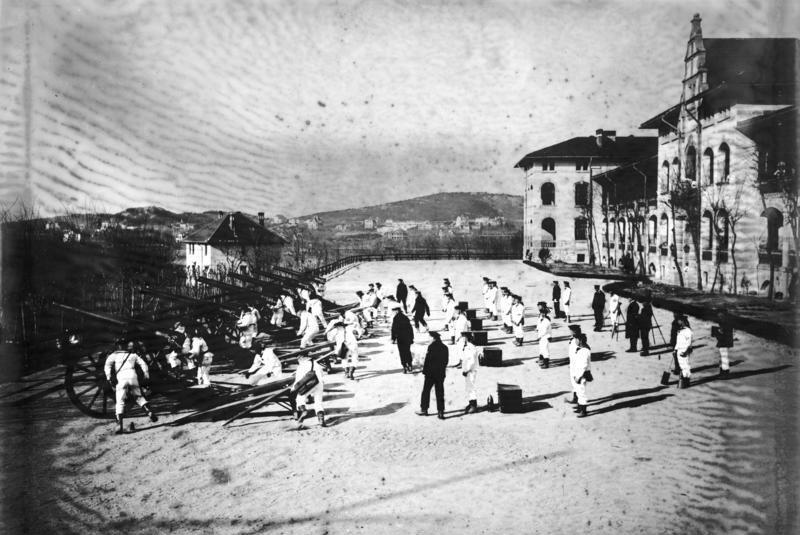
A battery of either 9 cm Kanone C/79's or 12 cm Kanone C/80's. There was a six-gun battery of each type at Tsingtao.

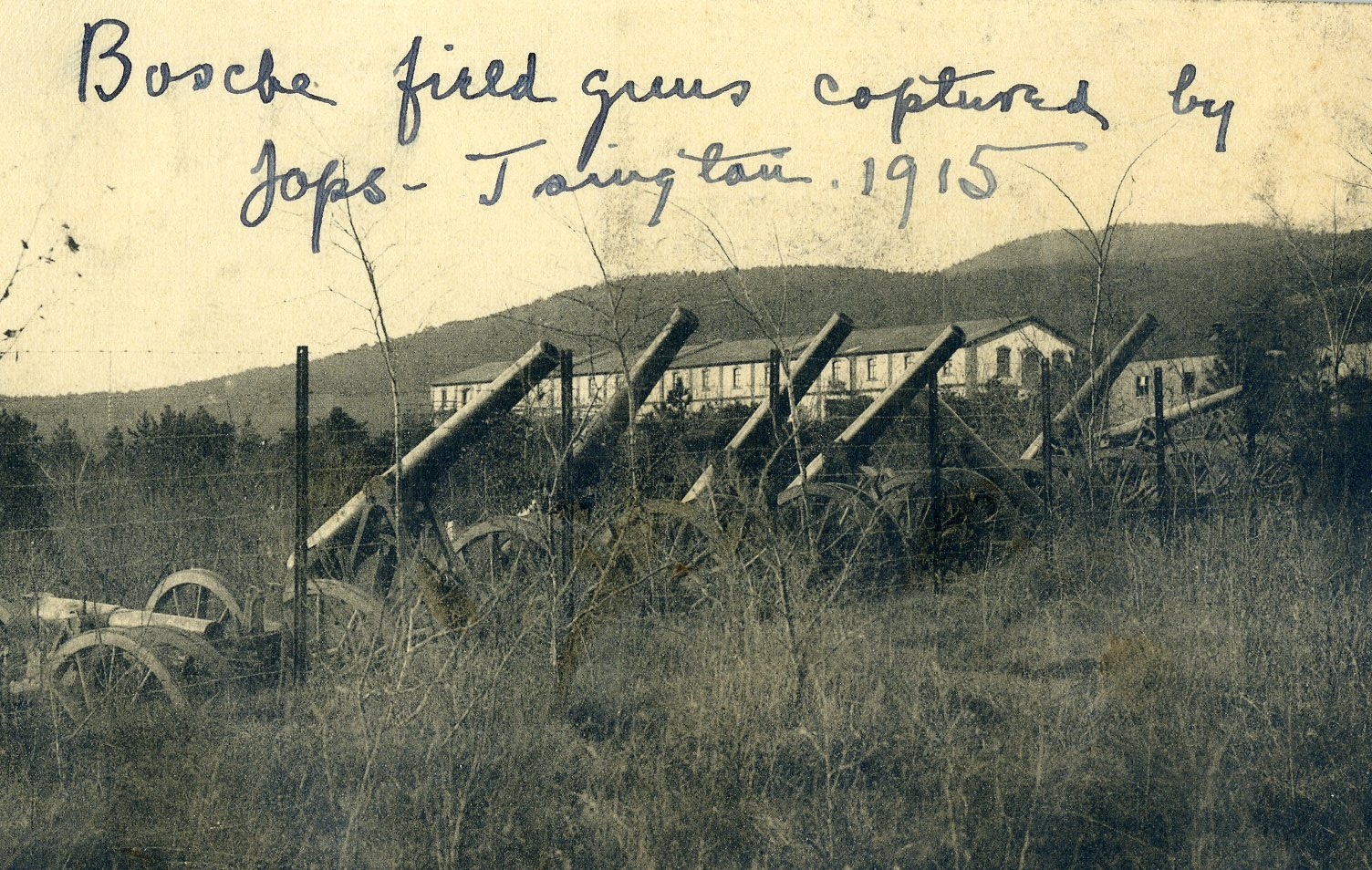
Guns captured by the Japanese.

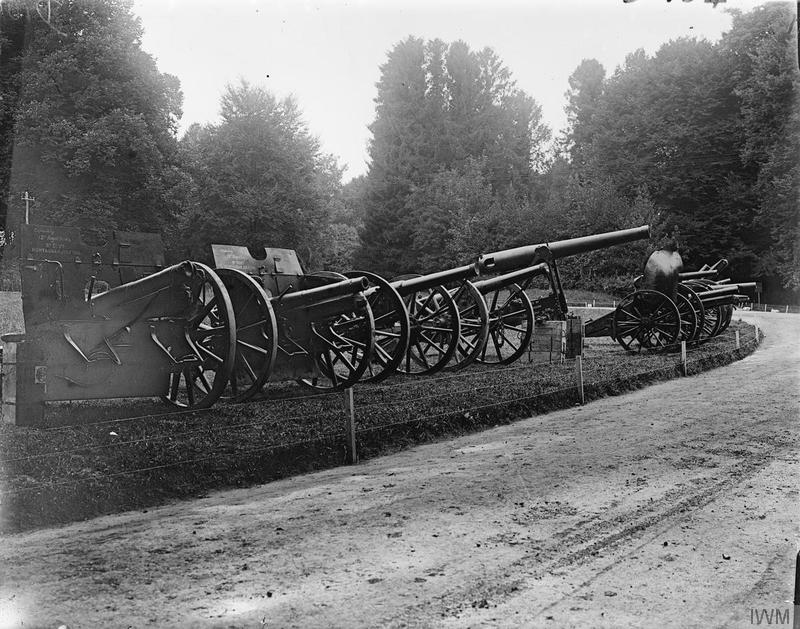
German artillery captured during the Battle of the Somme. The tall gun in the center without wheels is either a C/79 or C/80.

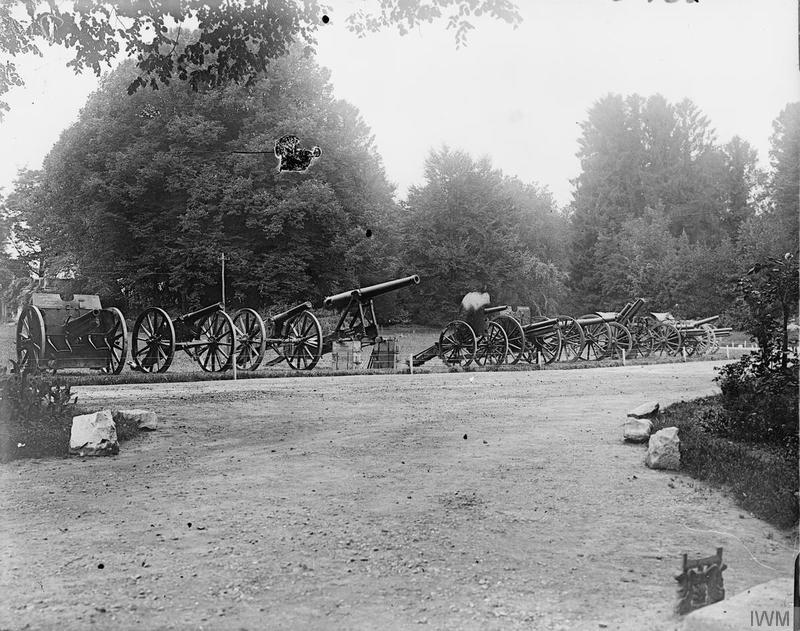
Both guns used the same carriage and were visually very similar with only a 700 mm (28 in) difference in barrel length.

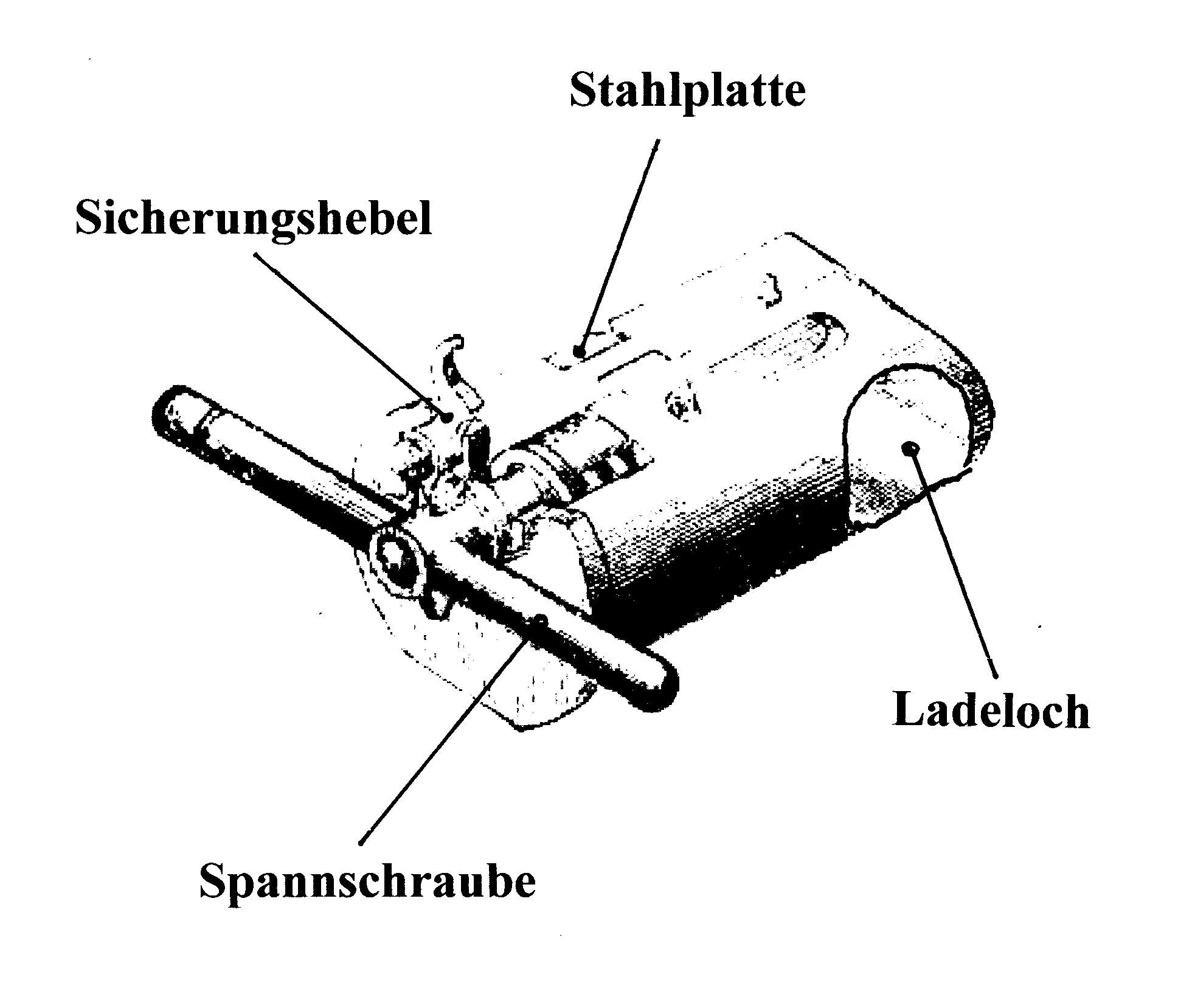
The breech block of the C/80.
