= 28 cm Haubitze L/14 i.R. =

German howitzer

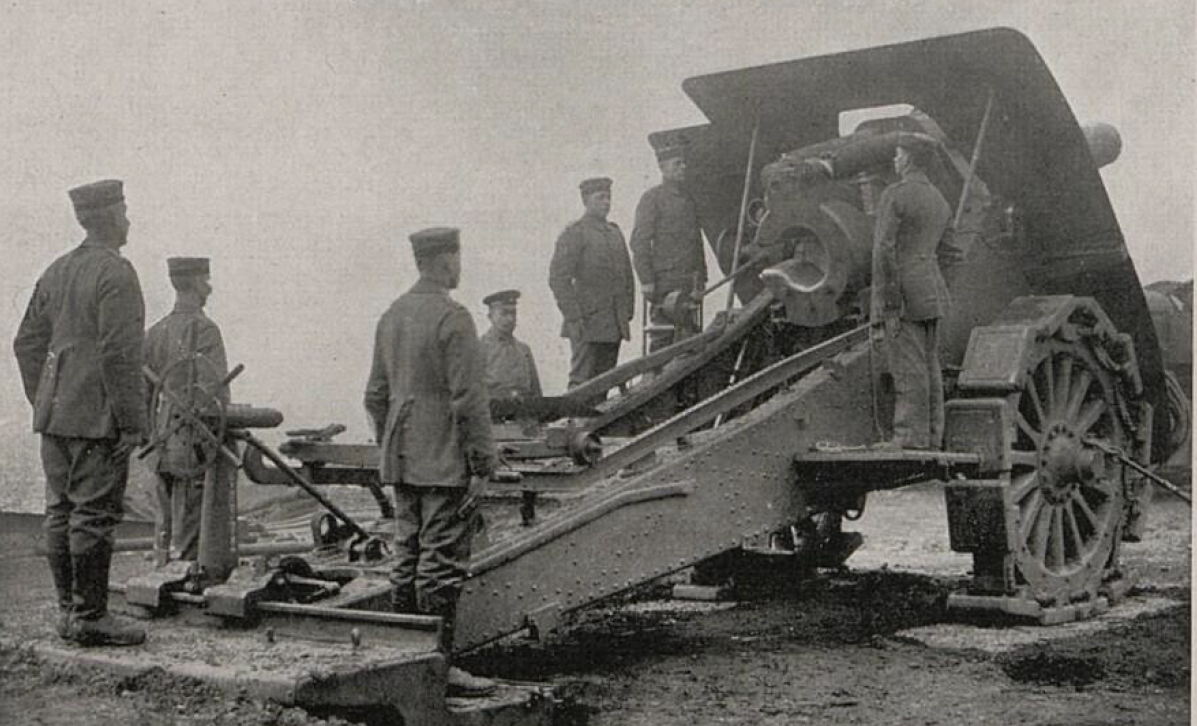
- Type: Siege Howitzer
- Place of origin: German Empire

Service history
- In service: 1913–1918
- Used by: German Empire
- Wars: World War I

Production history
- Designer: Krupp
- Designed: 1913
- Manufacturer: Krupp
- Produced: 1913
- No. built: 1

Specifications
- Mass: Travel: 17.8–20.3 t (17.5–20.0 long tons; 19.6–22.4 short tons); Combat: 15.2 t (15.0 long tons; 16.8 short tons)
- Barrel length: 3.96 m (13 ft) L/14
- Shell: Separate-loading, cased charges and projectiles
- Shell weight: 285 kg (628 lb)
- Caliber: 283 mm (11 in)
- Breech: Horizontal sliding-block
- Recoil: Hydro-pneumatic
- Carriage: Box trail
- Elevation: +20° to +65°
- Traverse: 12°
- Rate of fire: 1 round ever two minutes
- Muzzle velocity: 346 m/s (1,140 ft/s)
- Maximum firing range: 9.7 km (6 mi)

The 28 cm Haubitze L/14 in Räderlafette (14-caliber Howitzer on Wheeled Carriage) was a prototype German siege howitzer which served during World War I.

== History ==
The design for the 28 cm Haubitze L/14 i.R. dates back to a similar 20 cm howitzer that was designed in 1903 and offered to the Austro-Hungarian Army. A modified 28 cm version was built by Krupp in 1913 and tested by the German Army but was not accepted for large-scale production and only one prototype was built. It was felt that 28 cm was too small so larger weapons were developed. The 28 cm Haubitze L/14 i.R. belonged to the same class of weapons like the 42 cm M-Gerät or the Skoda 305 mm Model 1911 that were designed to destroy reinforced-concrete fortifications in Belgium, France, and Poland.

=== World War I ===
The sole gun of this type was assigned to beta battery No.8 on the Eastern Front during 1915. In February 1915 the battery took part in the unsuccessful bombardment of the Russian Osowiec Fortress in Northeast Poland. In June 1915 the battery then took part in the successful recapture of the former Austro-Hungarian fortress of Przemyśl. In August 1915 the battery next took part in the successful siege of the Russian fortress at Kaunas in Lithuania. In October the battery then took part in the successful invasion of Serbia and bombarded strong points on the far side of the Danube. During 1916 the battery was moved to the Western Front and participated in the unsuccessful German bombardment of Verdun and during the Somme offensive. The battery served until the end of the war on the Western Front and its last action was during the unsuccessful German Michael Offensive in the Spring of 1918.

== Design ==
The 28 cm Haubitze L/14 i.R. was a short barreled breech-loading howitzer on a two-wheeled box trail carriage with an integrated ammunition hoist and a hydro-pneumatic recoil mechanism. The gun had a horizontal sliding-block breech and it fired separate-loading, cased charges, and projectiles. There was also a large blast shield to protect the crew during firing.

To facilitate towing on soft ground the wheels were often fitted with Bonagente grousers patented by the Italian major Crispino Bonagente. These consisted of rectangular plates connected with elastic links and are visible in many photographs of World War I artillery from all of the combatants. For transport, the 28 cm Haubitze L/14 i.R. could be broken down into two or three separate wagon loads for the barrel and carriage.

== Gallery ==
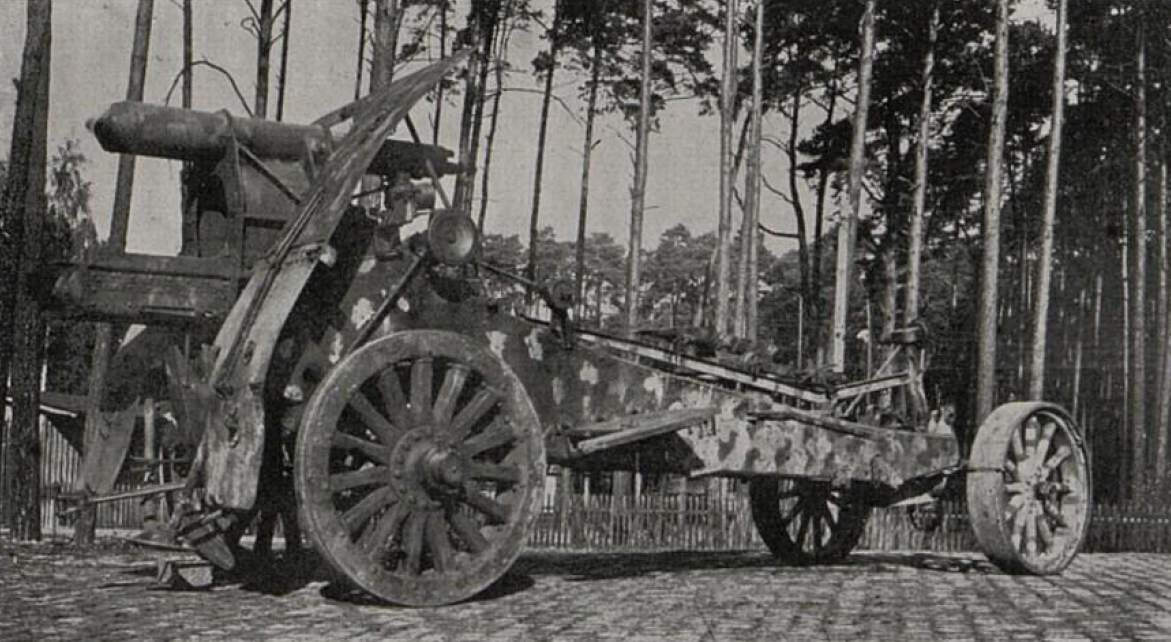
Gun carriage hitched up.

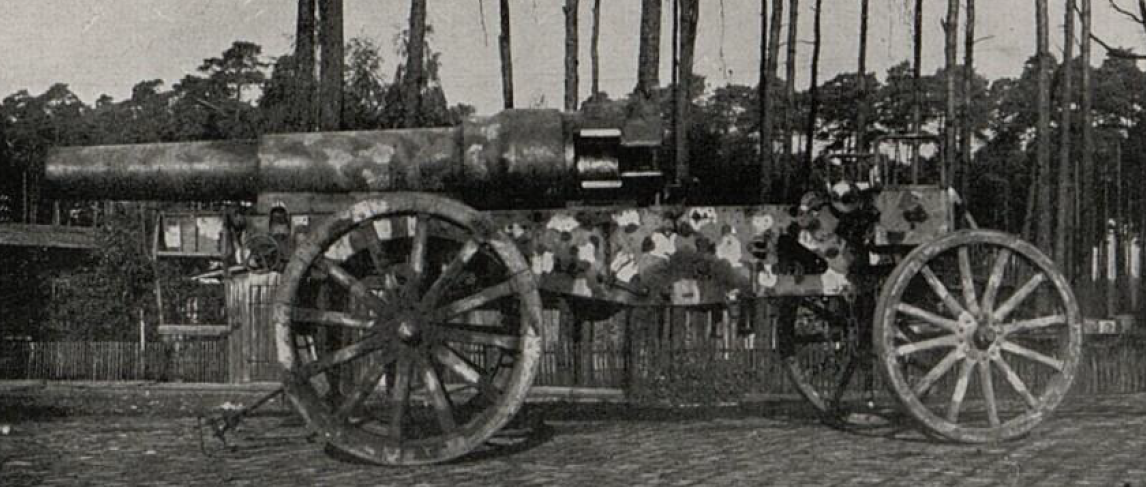
Barrel trolley

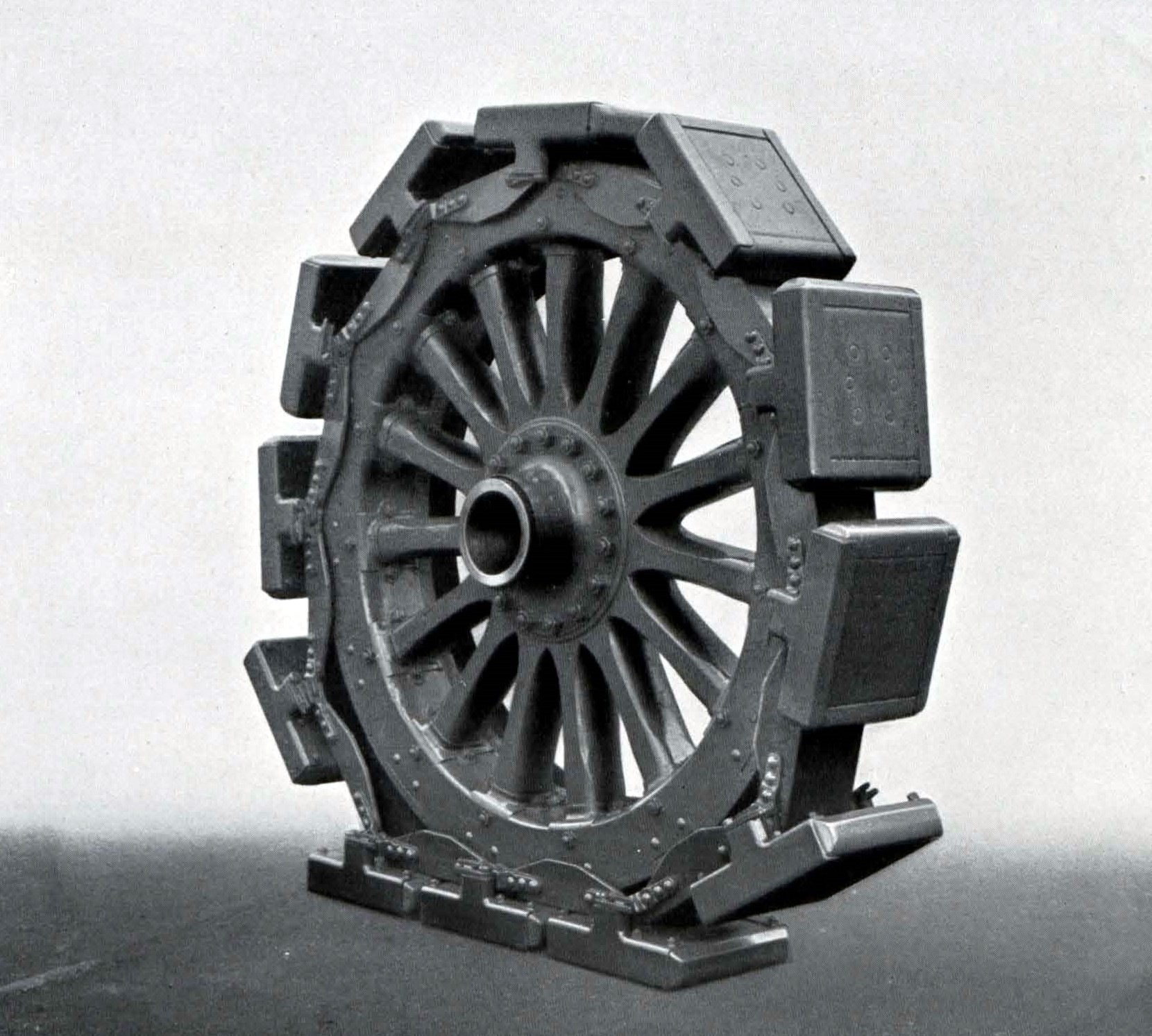
Bonagente grousers.
