= 15 cm sFH 93 =

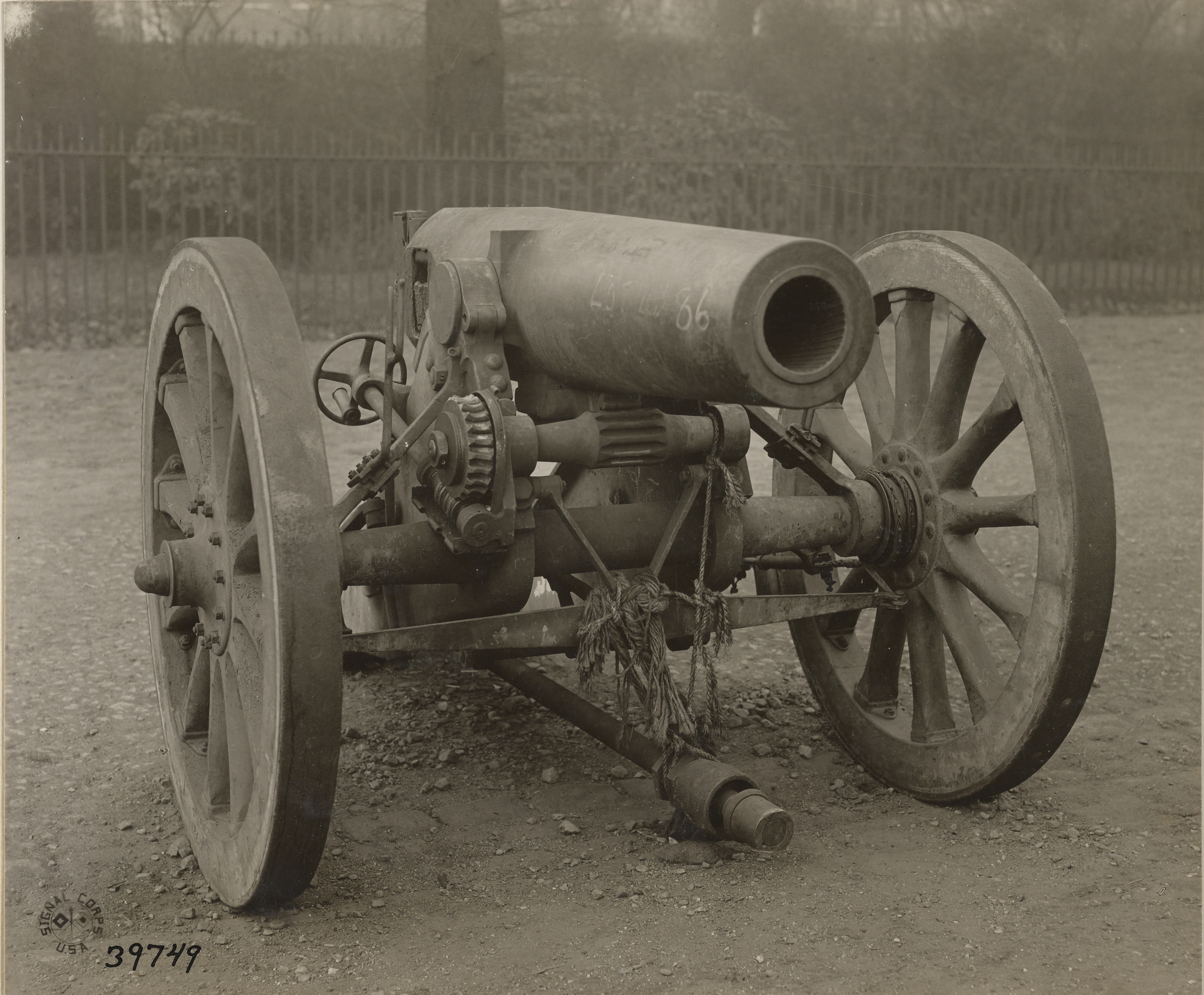
- A captured 15 cm sFH 93
- Type: Howitzer
- Place of origin: German Empire

Service history
- In service: 1893−1918
- Used by: See users
- Wars: See wars

Production history
- Designer: Krupp
- Designed: 1891
- Manufacturer: Krupp
- Produced: 1893
- No. built: 870 in 1914

Specifications
- Mass: Travel: 2,725 kg (6,008 lb); Combat: 2,188 kg (4,824 lb)
- Barrel length: 1.6 m (5 ft 3 in) L/11
- Shell: Separate-loading, bagged charges and projectiles
- Shell weight: 42 kg (93 lb)
- Caliber: 149.7 mm (5.89 in)
- Breech: Horizontal sliding-block
- Recoil: None
- Carriage: Box trail
- Elevation: 0 to +65°
- Traverse: None
- Rate of fire: 2 rpm
- Muzzle velocity: 280 m/s (920 ft/s)
- Effective firing range: Time Fuse: 5,700 m (6,200 yd)
- Maximum firing range: Impact Fuse: 6,000 m (6,600 yd)

The 15 cm sFH 93 was a German howitzer which served in a number of colonial conflicts, the Balkan Wars and World War I.

== History ==
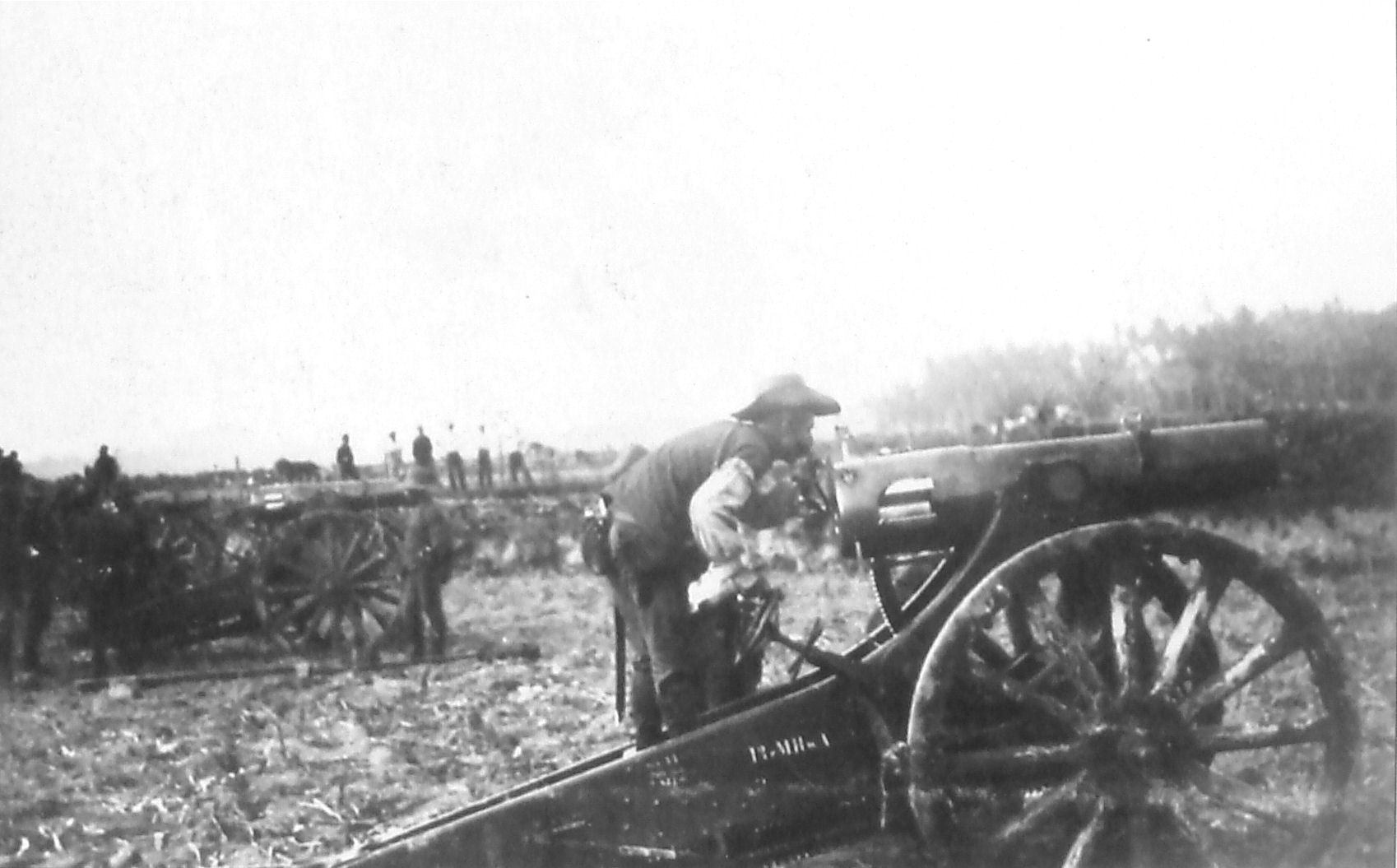
A Dutch 15 cm mortar designed by Krupp a decade earlier during the Balinese Intervention of 1906

The 15 cm sFH 93 was designed and built by Krupp and entered service in 1893. The sFH 93 was designed with the lessons of the Franco-Prussian and Russo-Turkish war in mind where field guns with smaller shells and limited elevation had difficulty overcoming fortifications. What was needed was a howitzer capable of high-angle fire that could drop a large shell inside the walls of enemy fortifications. The sFH 93 was fairly conventional for its time and most nations had similar pieces, including a similar 15 cm Krupp field mortar introduced by the Netherlands in 1882. However, its lack of recoil mechanism made it dated and by the time the First World War broke out it had been largely replaced.

The majority of military planners before the First World War were wedded to the concept of fighting an offensive war of rapid maneuver that, in a time before mechanization, meant a focus on cavalry and light horse artillery firing shrapnel shells. Although the majority of combatants had heavy field artillery prior to the outbreak of the First World War, none had adequate numbers of heavy guns in service, nor had they foreseen the growing importance of heavy artillery once the Western Front stagnated and trench warfare set in. The theorists hadn't foreseen that trenches, barbed wire, and machine guns had robbed them of the mobility they had been counting on and, like in the Franco-Prussian and Russo-Turkish wars, the need for high-angle heavy artillery reasserted itself. Since aircraft of the period were not yet capable of carrying large diameter bombs, the burden of delivering heavy firepower fell on the artillery. The combatants scrambled to find anything that could fire a heavy shell and that meant emptying the fortresses and scouring the depots for guns held in reserve. It also meant converting coastal artillery and naval guns to siege guns by either giving them simple field carriages or mounting the larger pieces on rail carriages.

Although largely replaced by the German Army before the First World War, the sFH 93 was brought back into service because of a combination of higher than expected losses of field artillery and insufficient numbers of heavy guns, which led to them being brought out of reserve and issued as replacements to field artillery regiments.

== Design ==
The sFH 93 was a short barreled breech-loading cannon on a rigid two-wheeled box trail carriage. The barrel was a typical built-up gun of the period with all steel construction. The gun had an early form of horizontal sliding-block breech and it fired separate-loading, bagged charges and projectiles. The sFH 93 fired a wide variety of different projectiles, which are listed here. The advantage the sFH 93 had over its predecessors was that it was made from nickel-steel of much greater strength than previous guns of cast iron construction. This meant that the sFH 93 could be much smaller in diameter and lighter in weight than its predecessors, which meant it was easier for it to keep pace with infantry divisions on the march. It also meant that, unlike previous guns, it could be transported in one piece and was light enough to be part of maneuvering forces to overcome local strong points rather than relegated to the slower siege train. However, the cavalry still felt the sFH 93 was too heavy for their use so they were assigned to heavy howitzer battalions of the infantry. For travel, the gun could be attached to a limber and towed by a six-horse team and each battery consisted of four guns with four batteries per battalion.

Like many of its contemporaries, its carriage did not have a recoil mechanism. For prolonged use, a spot of ground could be leveled and a wooden firing platform could be laid for the guns. The guns could then be connected to an external recoil mechanism, which connected to a steel eye on the firing platform and a hook on the carriage between the wheels. A set of wooden ramps were then placed behind the wheels and when the gun fired the wheels rolled up the ramp and was returned to position by the combined effect of the recoil mechanism and gravity. In the field, only ramps were used. There was also no traversing mechanism and the gun had to be levered into position to aim. A drawback of this system was the gun had to be re-aimed each time, which lowered the rate of fire.

== Users ==
- German Empire
- Empire of Japan
- Netherlands
- Ottoman Empire

== Wars ==
- Boxer Rebellion
- Herero Wars
- Russo-Japanese War
- Balinese Intervention
- Italo-Turkish War
- Balkan Wars
- World War I

== Photo gallery ==
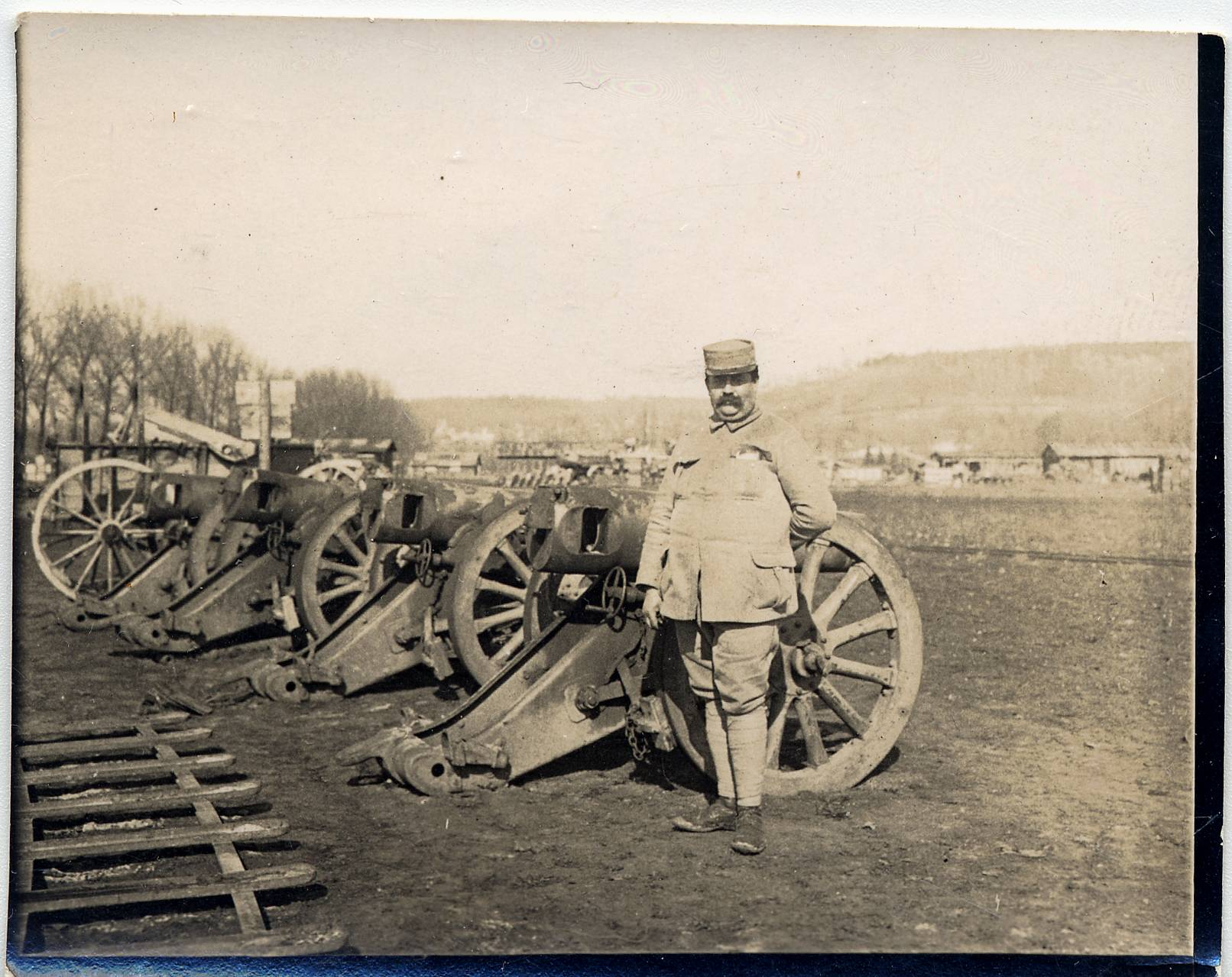
Four sFH 93's captured by the French.

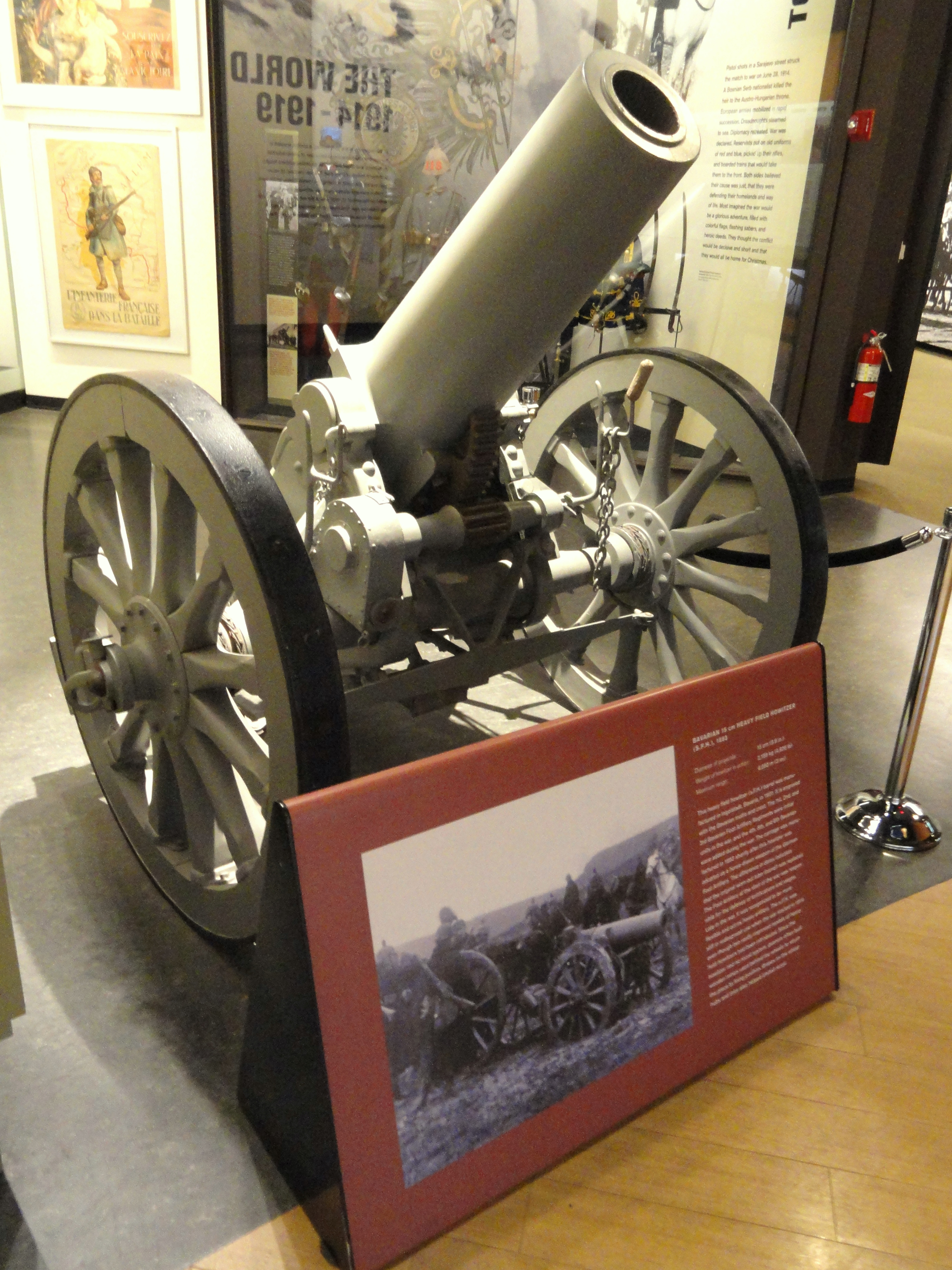
A captured sFH 93 at the National World War I Museum in Kansas City, MO.

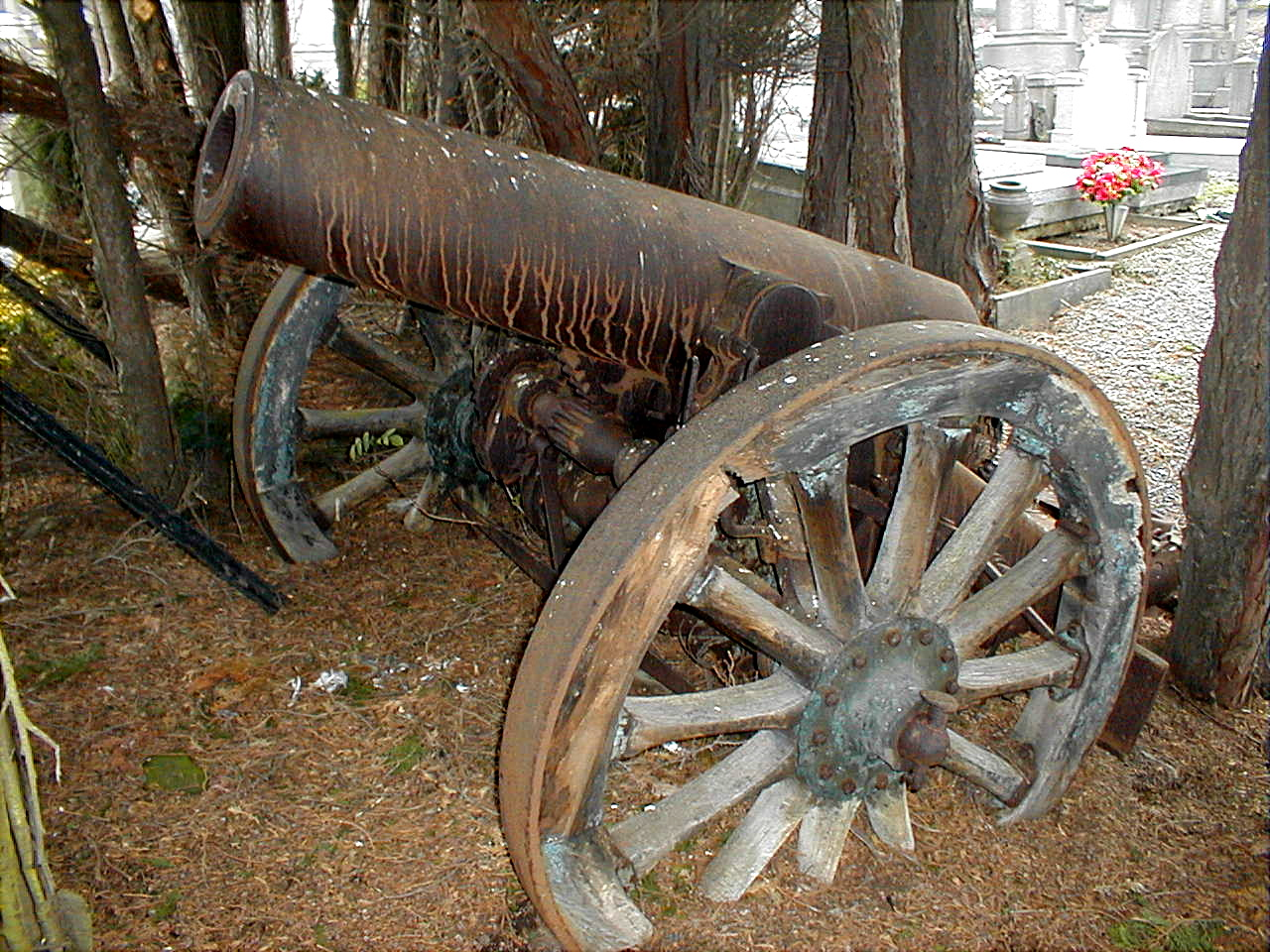
A sFH 93 in the cemetery at Jemappes.

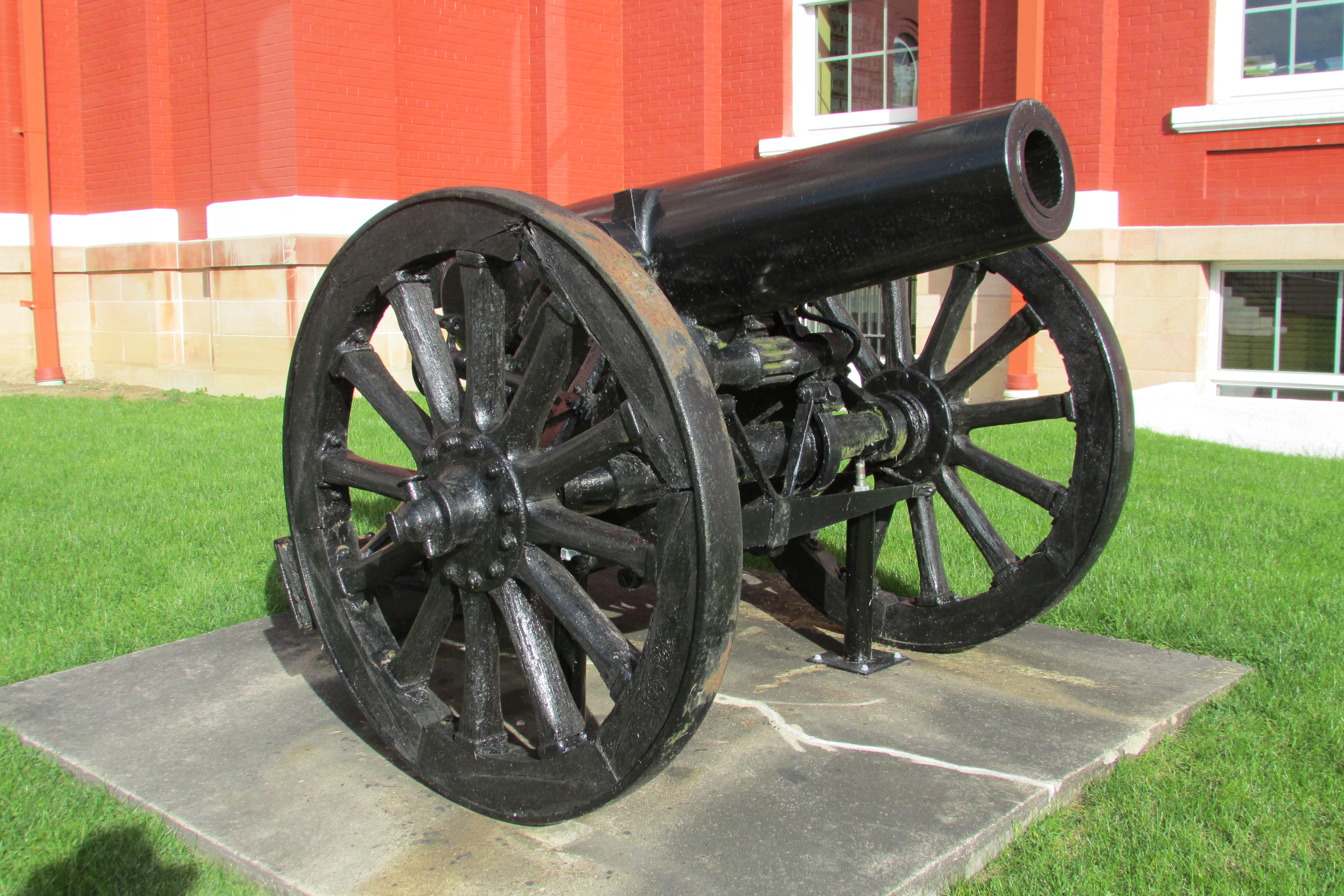
A sFH 93 at a WWI memorial in Brookville, Pennsylvania

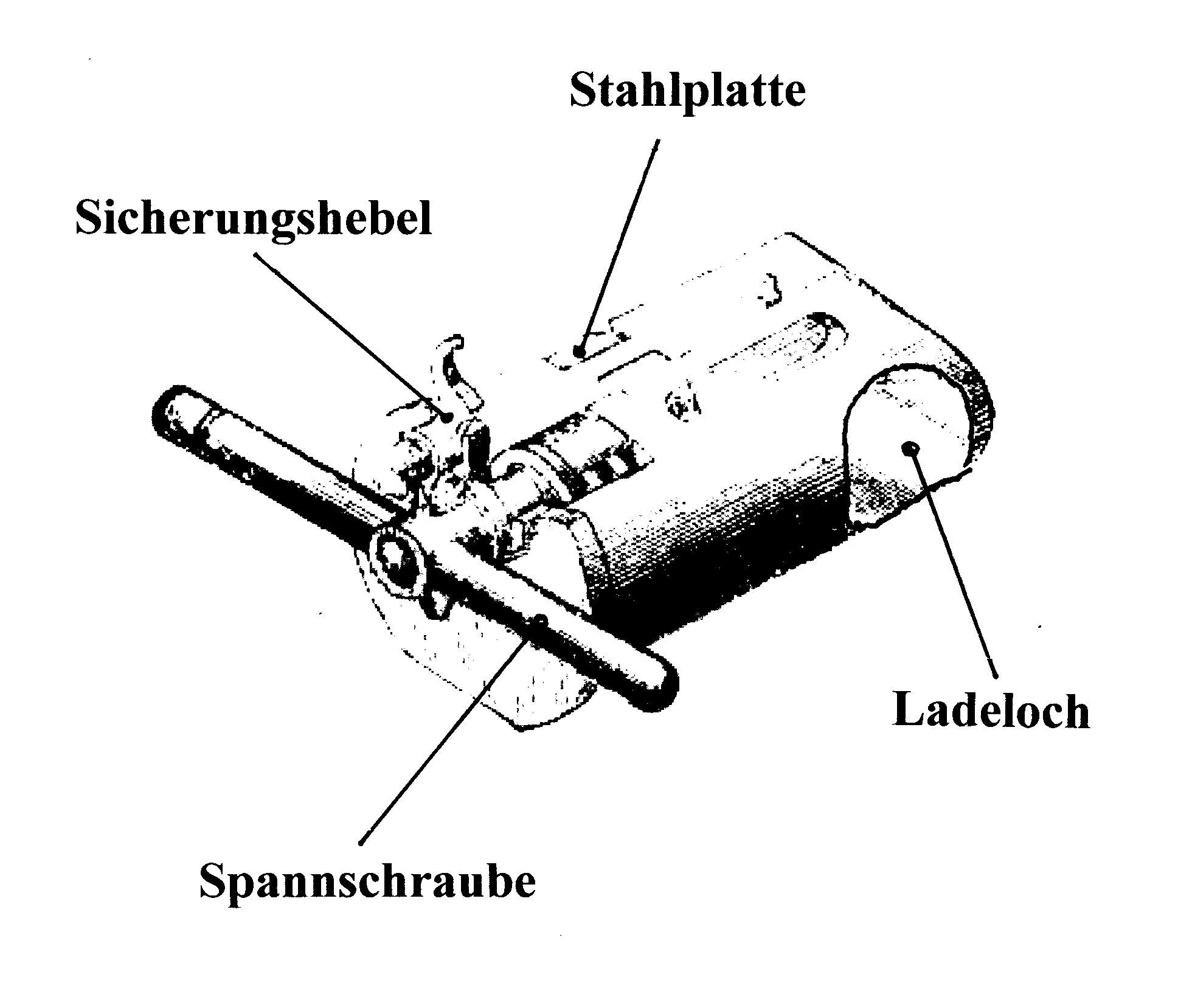
A sFH 93 breech block
