= 6 cm S-Bts K L/21 =

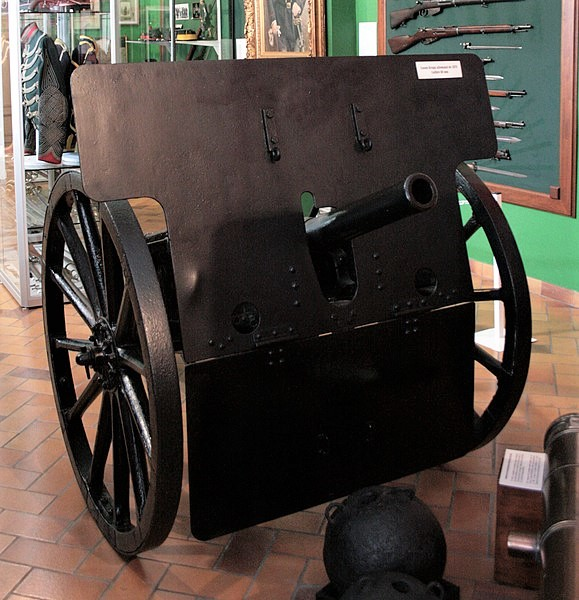
- A misidentified 6 cm S-Bts K L/21 at the Musée d'Armes, Tournai, Belgium.
- Type: Landing gun
- Place of origin: German Empire

Service history
- Used by: German Empire
- Wars: World War I

Production history
- Designer: Krupp
- Designed: 1898

Specifications
- Mass: Barrel: 105 kg (231 lb); Carriage: 340 kg (750 lb); Limber: 430 kg (950 lb)
- Barrel length: 1.26 m (4 ft 2 in) L/21
- Width: 1 m (3 ft 3 in)
- Shell: Fixed quickfire 60 x 64R
- Shell weight: 2.7 kg (6 lb)
- Caliber: 60 mm (2.4 in)
- Breech: Horizontal sliding block
- Recoil: None
- Carriage: Box trail
- Elevation: Center pivot: -3° to +15° Field carriage: -10° to +20°
- Traverse: None
- Rate of fire: 12-14 rpm
- Muzzle velocity: 448 m/s (1,470 ft/s)
- Maximum firing range: 3.4 km (2.1 mi)

The 6 cm Schnelllade-Boots-Kanone L/21 in Landungslafette C/1900 (6 cm fast-firing boat's cannon 21 calibers on landing carriage circa 1900) or 6 cm S-Bts K L/21 was a landing gun used by Germany during World War I.

== Background ==
Warships of the Imperial German Navy often carried a contingent of naval infantry that was responsible for manning garrisons to defend German ships while in foreign ports as well as arming troops for offensive amphibious operations. The problem that Krupp's engineers faced was that Seebataillon troops were often an expeditionary force operating in areas with limited road and rail infrastructure so a lightweight gun was needed to provide fire support to landing parties in rough terrain.

The field artillery of the time was designed to be towed by horse teams and then manhandled into firing position. Field artillery could usually be broken down into separate wagon loads with the barrel on one wagon towed by a horse team while a second horse team towed the carriage. Since traditional field artillery would be too large and heavy to be easily deployed during amphibious operations without specialized landing craft the guns would need to be broken down and stowed while at sea. It was thought it would be an advantage if the gun could be mounted on a center pivot mount aboard a launch to provide fire support for a landing party. Once ashore the landing party could remove the gun barrel from its shipboard mount and place it on its field carriage.

== Design ==
The 6 cm S-Bts K L/21 was a breech-loaded naval gun with a horizontal sliding block breech, a box trail carriage, gun shield, and two wooden-spoked steel-rimmed wheels. There was no recoil mechanism, no traversing mechanism, and elevation was controlled by a jackscrew beneath the breech. The lower part of the gun shield was hinged and could be folded forward and secured by chains on the shield for transport. Behind the gun shield, there were two metal frames on the carriage's axle which held ammunition boxes each with 14 rounds. When assembled the guns could then be attached to a limber that carried four boxes of ammunition and towed by a horse team. The guns used 60 mm (2.4 in) fixed quickfire ammunition similar to those used by existing field, fortress, and mountain guns. Since it had limited elevation it was a direct fire weapon meant to fire on troops in the open and the most common shell types was high-explosive, canister and shrapnel. However, a drawback with landing guns was they were often small caliber with reduced propellant loads to reduce recoil and lacked range because their barrels were short to keep them light and portable.

== World War I ==
In addition to being used by Seebataillon units the 6 cm S-Bts K L/21 was used by the Schutztruppe in Germany's colonial empire. They may have been used before World War I during the Boxer Rebellion, the Herero Wars or the Maji Maji Rebellion. In the African theater of World War I, the SMS Königsberg sent its guns ashore to serve with the Schutztruppe in German East Africa in August 1914. Another two guns arrived in East Africa on board the blockade runner, SS Rubens in 1916. Beginning in 1915, several naval infantry units armed with 6 cm S-Bts K L/21 guns were based in the Flanders region of Belgium. They are believed to have been used as infantry support guns due to their ability to be easily transported over soft ground.

== Gallery ==
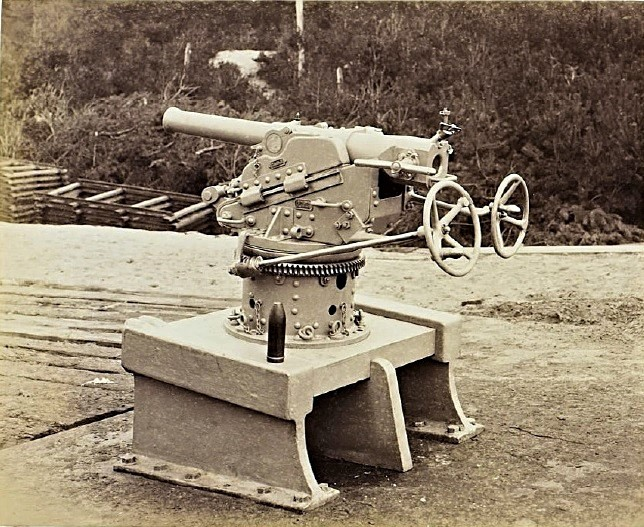
A 6 cm boat-gun L/21 on a Vavasseur mount.

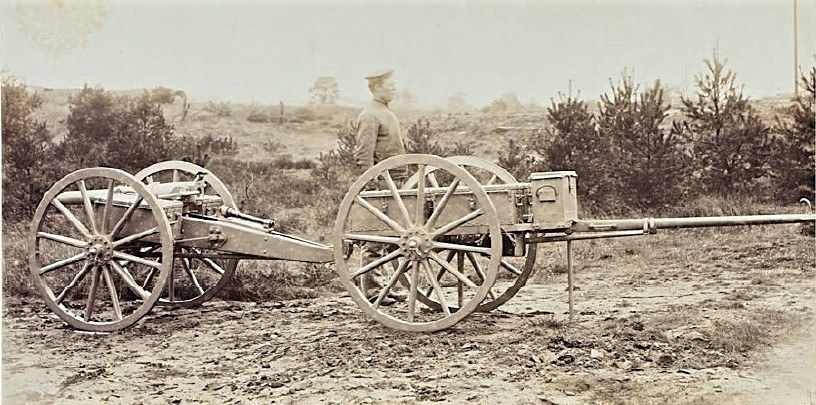
A 6 cm L/21 without shield attached to its limber.

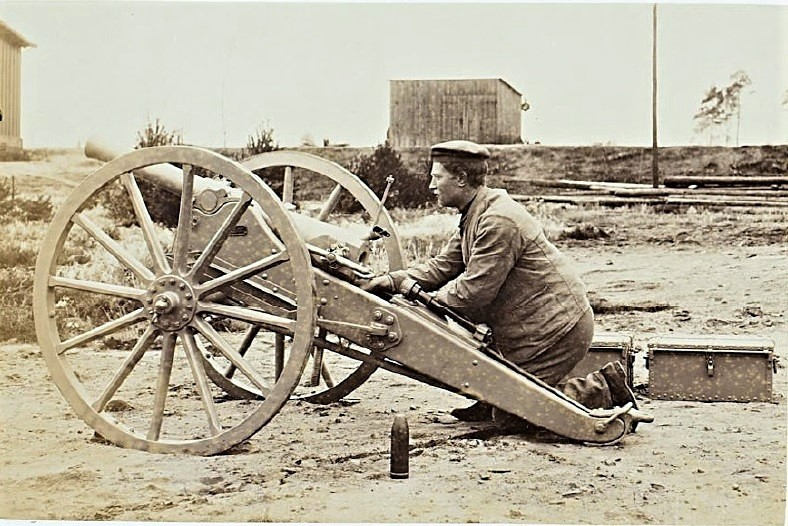
A 6 cm L/21 in firing position with ammunition boxes dismounted.

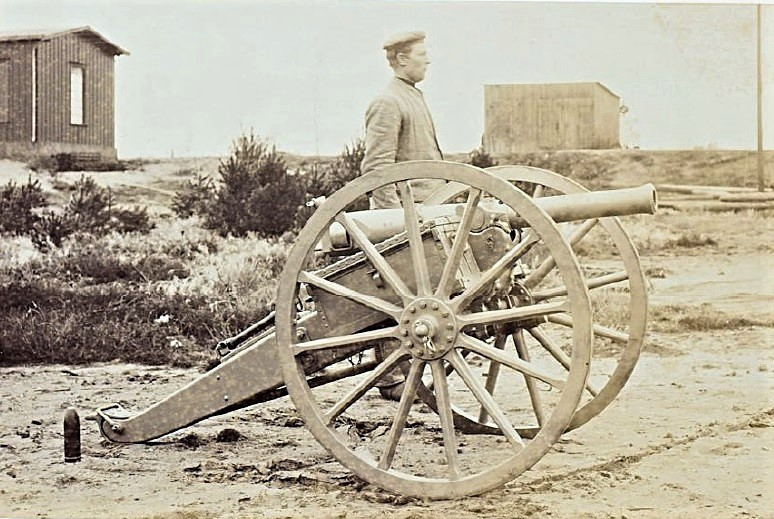
A 6 cm L/21 with ammunition boxes mounted.

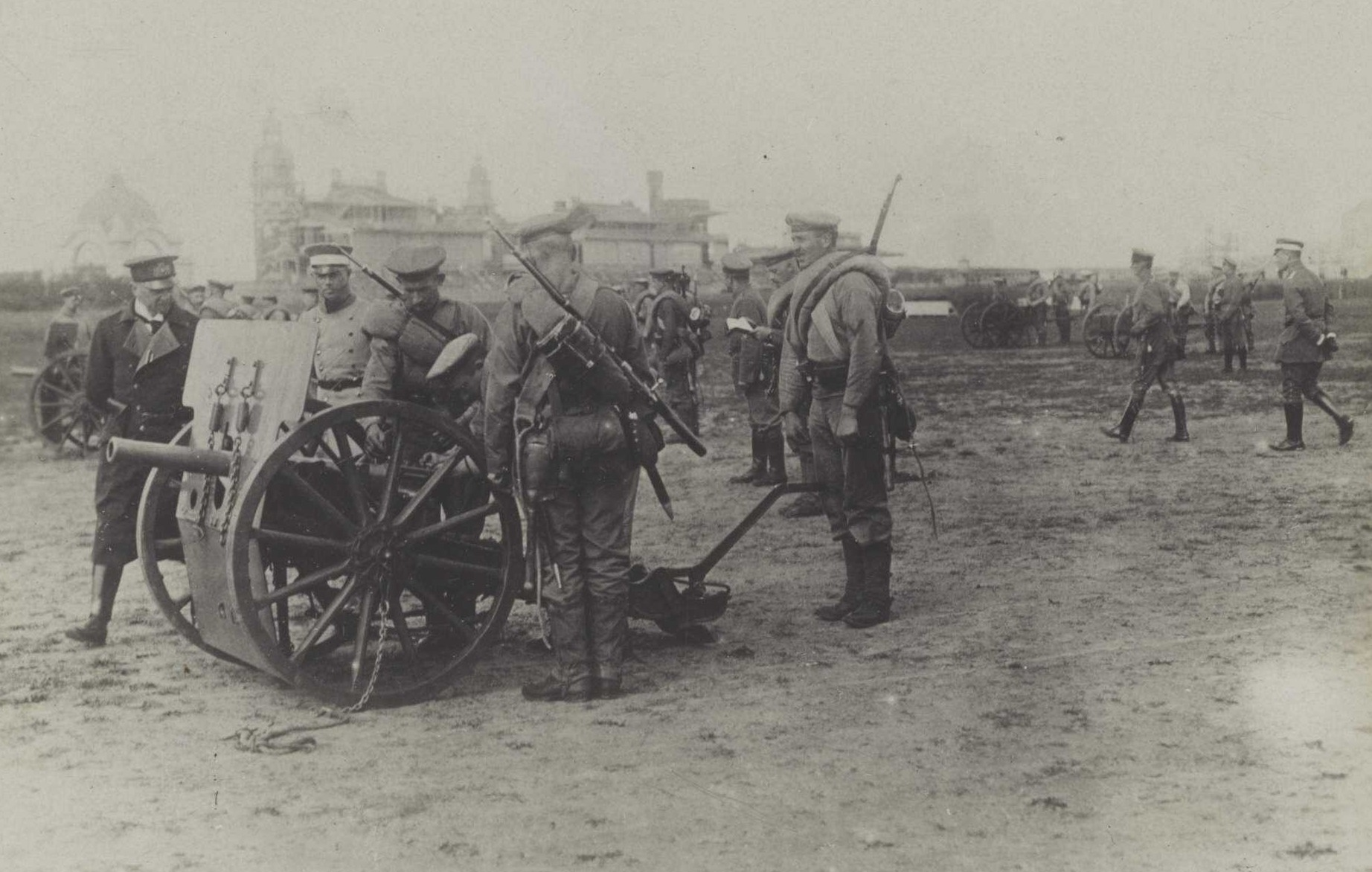
Seebataillon troops with a 6 cm S-Bts K L/21.
