= 9 cm Kanone C/79 =

German artillery piece

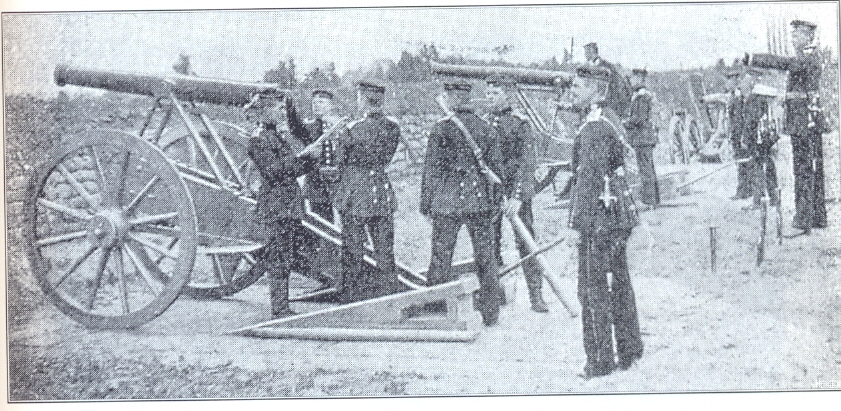
- A battery of C/79's during a pre-war exercise.
- Type: Fortress gun Siege gun
- Place of origin: German Empire

Service history
- In service: 1879−1918
- Used by: German Empire
- Wars: World War I

Production history
- Designer: Krupp
- Designed: 1879
- Manufacturer: Krupp
- Produced: 1879−1891
- Variants: Anti-aircraft gun

Specifications
- Mass: Combat: 1,300 kg (2,900 lb)
- Barrel length: 2.1 m (6 ft 11 in) L/24
- Shell: Separate-loading, bagged charges and projectiles
- Shell weight: HE: 7.2 kg (15 lb 14 oz); Shrapnel: 8.1 kg (17 lb 14 oz)
- Caliber: 88 mm (3.5 in)
- Breech: Horizontal sliding-block
- Recoil: None
- Carriage: Box trail
- Elevation: -15° to +17.5°
- Traverse: 6°
- Rate of fire: 2 rpm
- Muzzle velocity: 442 m/s (1,450 ft/s)
- Maximum firing range: 6.6 km (4.1 mi)

The 9 cm Kanone C/79 was a fortress and siege gun developed after the Franco-Prussian War and used by Germany before and during World War I.

== History ==
After the Franco-Prussian War, the German Army began to study replacements for its 9 cm Kanone C/64 breech loaded cannons. Although the C/64 had outclassed its French rivals during the war its breech was weak and there was a tendency for barrels to burst due to premature detonation of shells. The new gun designated the C/79 would retain the same 88 mm (3.5 in) ammunition as the C/64 and was assigned to fortress and siege artillery regiments of the Army.

== Design ==
During the Franco-Prussian war, large numbers of French bronze cannons were captured and this material was melted down and used to build the new 9 cm Kanone C/79 and the similar 12 cm Kanone C/80. The C/79 was basically a bronze barreled variant of the steel barreled 9 cm Kanone C/73 on a fortress carriage rather than field carriage. The C/79 featured a new breech which although similar to the square breech block of the C/64 had a semi-circular face which allowed the gun to avoid the stress fractures which caused catastrophic failures in its predecessor. This type of breech was known as a cylindro-prismatic breech which was a predecessor of Krupp's horizontal sliding-block and the gun used separate-loading, bagged charges and projectiles. The C/79 could fire many of the same projectiles as the C/73 but may have not been able to fire some of the newer high explosive shells that the upgraded C/73-91 could fire.

Like many of its contemporaries, the C/79 had a tall and narrow box trail carriage built from bolted iron plates with two wooden 12-spoke wheels. The carriages were tall because the guns were designed to sit behind a parapet with the barrel overhanging the front in the fortress artillery role or behind a trench or berm in the siege role. Like many of its contemporaries, the C/79's carriage did not have a recoil mechanism or a gun shield. However, when used in a fortress the guns could be connected to an external recoil mechanism which connected to a steel eye on a concrete firing platform and a hook on the carriage between the wheels. For siege gun use a wooden firing platform could be assembled ahead of time and the guns could attach to the same type of recoil mechanism. A set of wooden ramps were also placed behind the wheels and when the gun fired the wheels rolled up the ramp and was returned to position by gravity. There was also limited traverse 6° so the gun had to be levered into position to aim. A drawback of this system was the gun had to be re-aimed each time which lowered the rate of fire. For transport, the gun was attached to a limber for towing by a horse team or artillery tractor. The C/79 used the same limber as the C/73 and the limber had seats for crew members plus ammunition and supplies.

== World War I ==
The majority of military planners before the First World War were wedded to the concept of fighting an offensive war of rapid maneuver which in a time before mechanization meant a focus on cavalry and light horse artillery firing shrapnel shells. Since the C/79 was heavier and wasn't designed with field use in mind it was employed as a fortress gun. However, once the Western Front stagnated and trench warfare set in fortresses, armories, coastal fortifications, and museums were scoured for artillery to send to the front. A combination of factors led the Germans to issue C/79's to their troops as replacements.

These included:

- An underestimation of light field artillery losses during the first two years of the war and an inadequate number of replacement guns being produced.
- An underestimation of ammunition consumption, inadequate production capacity, and resulting shortages.
- Since the C/73 had been replaced by the 7.7cm FK 96 n.A and relegated to reserve status there was a surplus of unused C/73's and C/79's. Since there wasn't another gun that used the same ammunition there was also an adequate stockpile of ammunition.
- Existing light field guns weren't tall enough to fire over the edge of trenches and their carriages weren't capable of high-angles of fire which meant that despite having gun shields their crews were vulnerable to counter-battery fire. Also, many light artillery pieces didn't have the range necessary to be used in an indirect-fire role.

Once adequate numbers of new field guns such as the 7.7 cm FK 16 with better range and high angles of elevation were being produced, obsolete types such as the C/79 and captured guns such as the 76 mm divisional gun M1902 field gun and Canon de 75 modèle 1897 were withdrawn from front-line service and issued to anti-aircraft units. At first, all of the combatants employed field guns on improvised anti-aircraft mounts, which were typically earthen embankments or scaffolds to get the muzzle pointed skyward. One such conversion for the C/79 was known as the Wohlgemuth system and this entailed removing the wheels from the carriage and placing the front of the carriage on a pedestal made from a large wooden crate with angle iron supports and stabilizers. It was estimated there were still 614 improvised anti-aircraft guns of various types in service in 1918.

== Photo Gallery ==
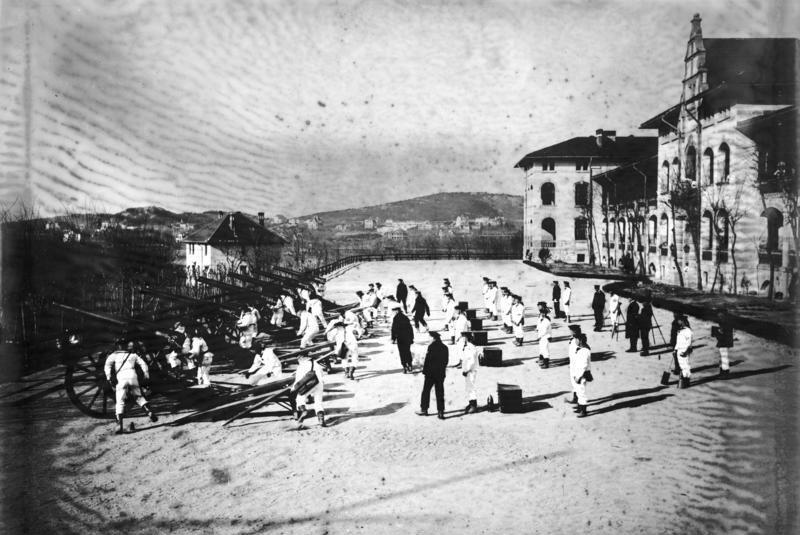
A battery of either 9 cm Kanone C/79's or 12 cm Kanone C/80's. There was a six-gun battery of each type at Tsingtao.

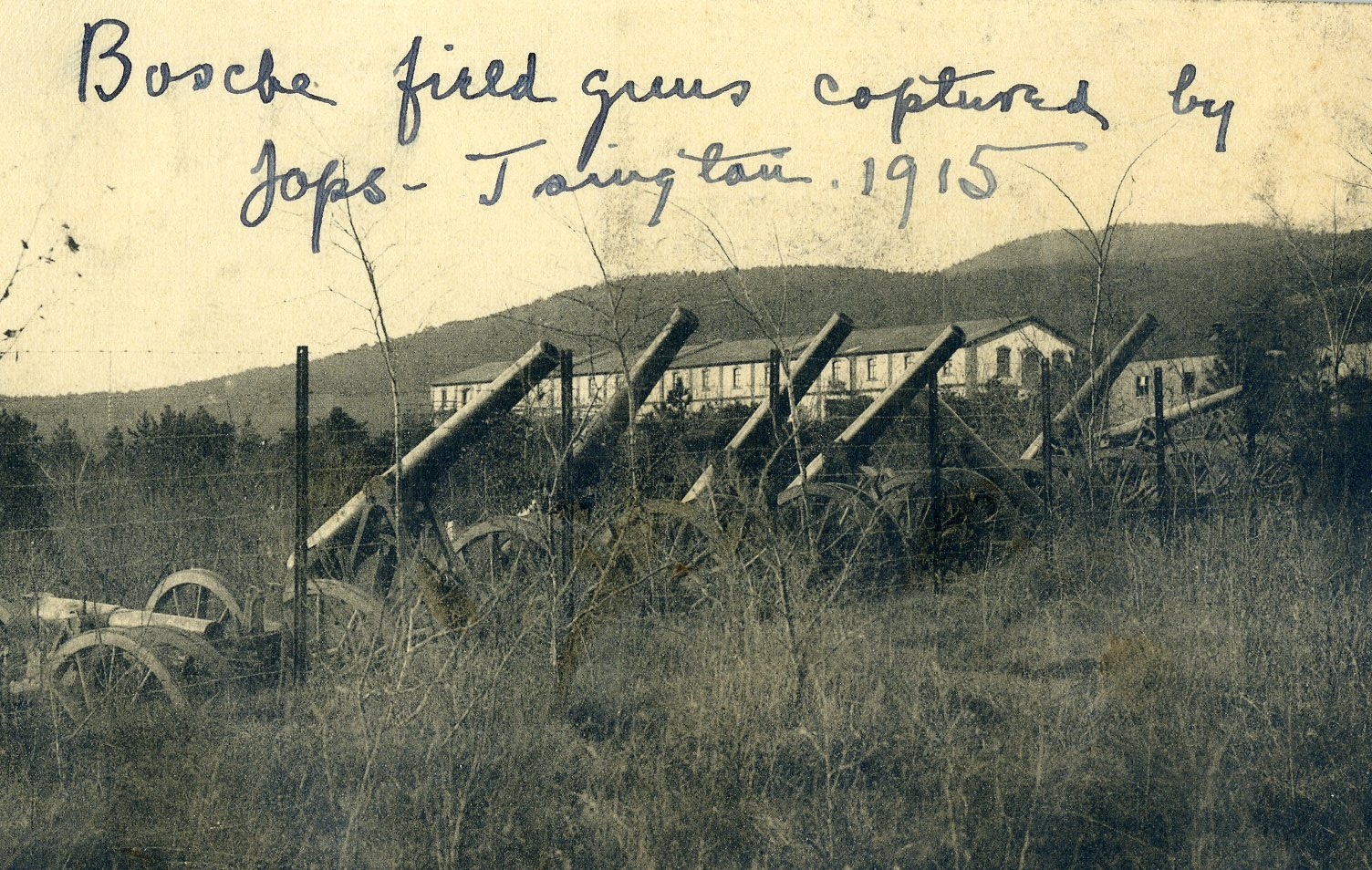
Guns captured by the Japanese.

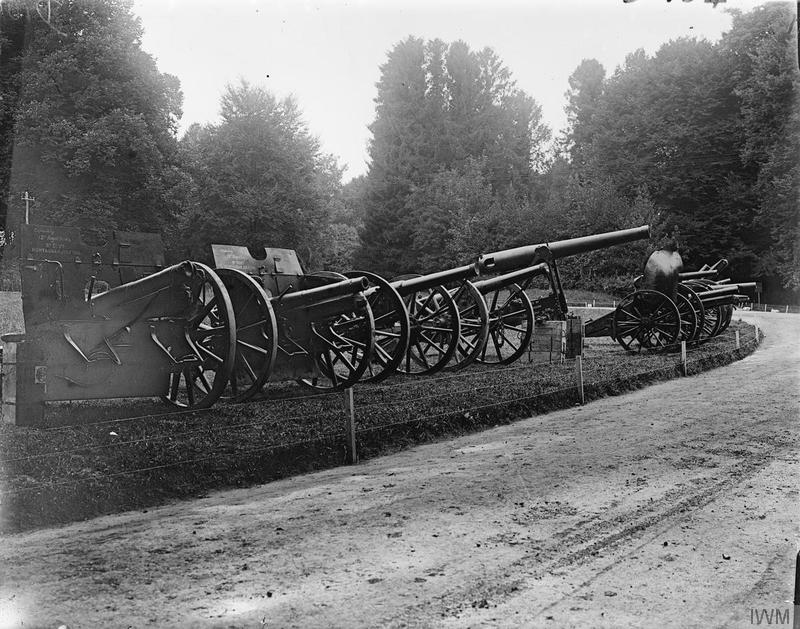
German artillery captured during the Battle of the Somme. The tall gun in the center without wheels is either a C/79 or C/80.

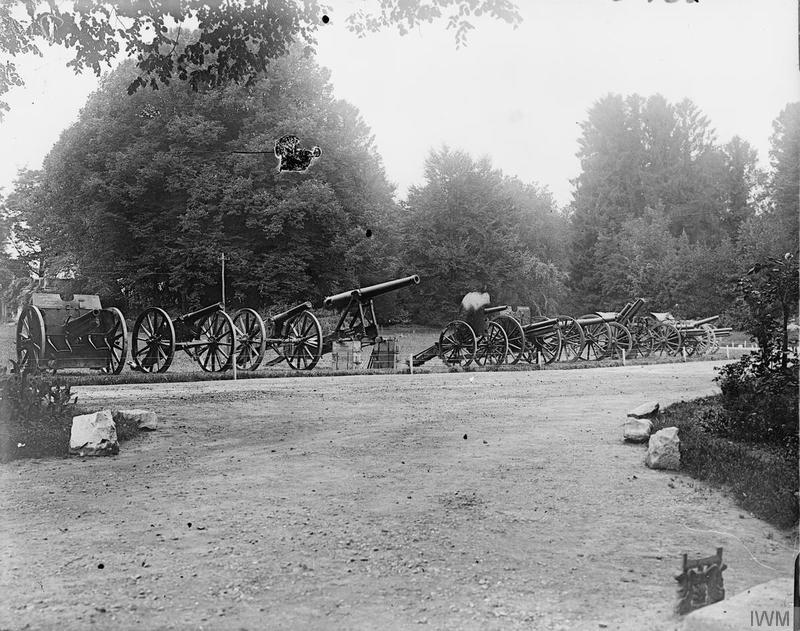
Both guns used the same carriage and were visually very similar with only a 700 mm (28 in) difference in barrel length.

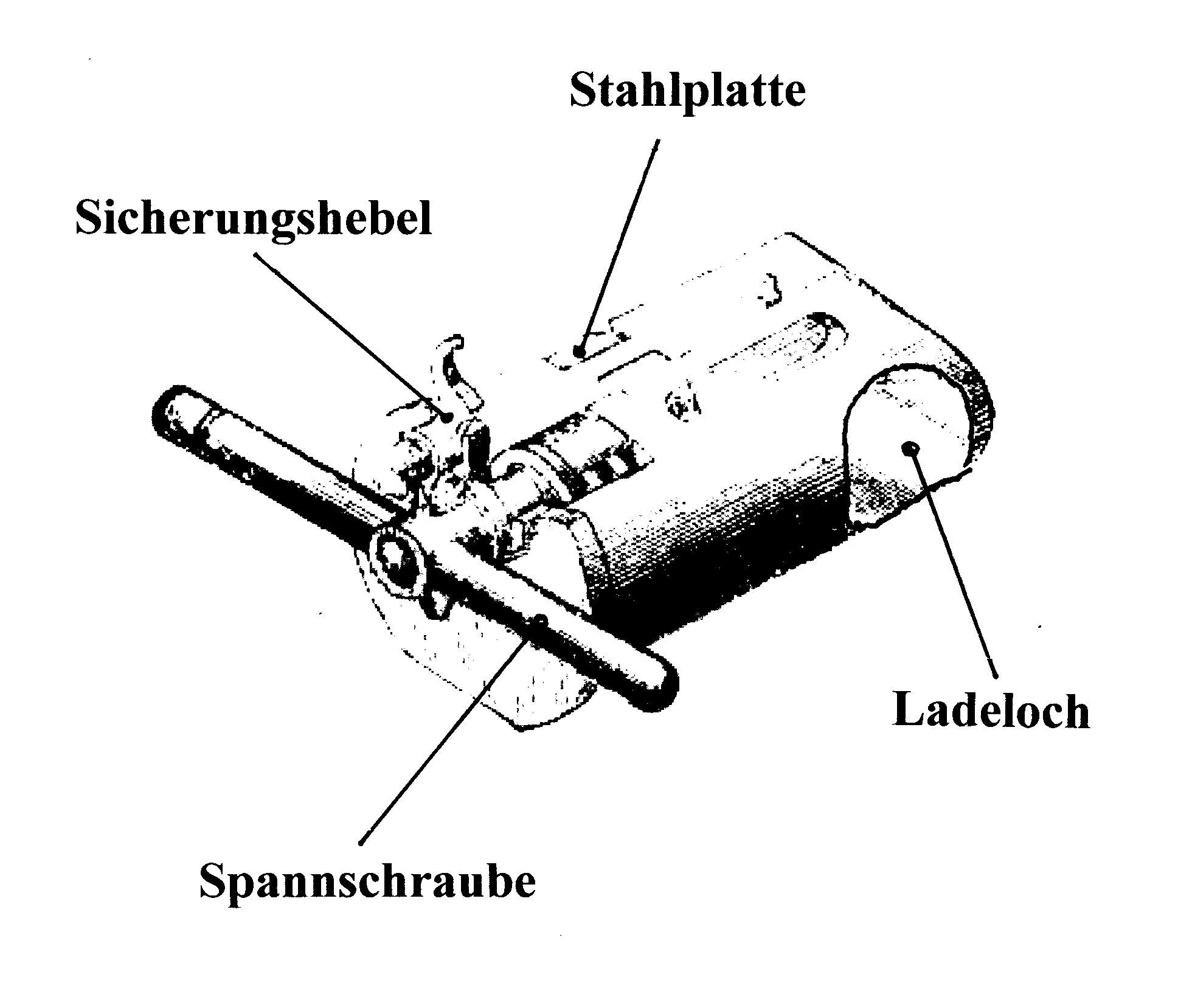
The breech block of the C/79.
