= 10 cm K 14 =

10 cm Kanone 14
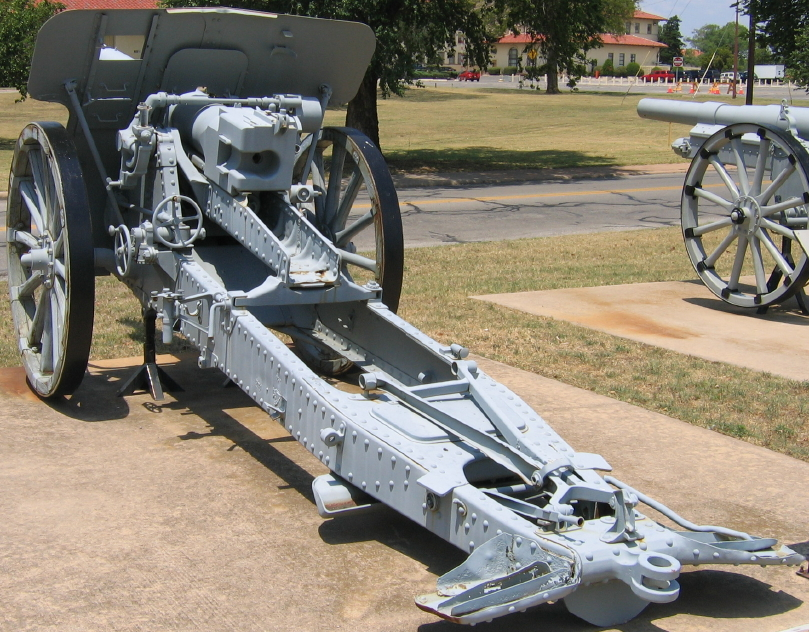
- A K 14 at the U.S. Army Field Artillery Museum, Ft. Sill, OK
- Type: Field gun
- Place of origin: German Empire

Service history
- In service: 1915–1918
- Used by: German Empire; Bulgaria
- Wars: World War I

Production history
- Designer: Krupp
- Designed: 1912−14
- Manufacturer: Krupp
- Produced: 1915−18
- No. built: 724

Specifications
- Mass: 2,820 kg (6,217 lbs)
- Barrel length: 4.725 m (15 ft 6 in) L/35
- Shell: separate-loading, cased charge
- Caliber: 105 mm (4.13 in)
- Breech: semi-automatic horizontal sliding-wedge
- Recoil: hydro-spring variable recoil
- Carriage: box trail
- Elevation: -5° to +45°
- Traverse: 6°
- Effective firing range: 12,085 m (13,092 yards)

The 10 cm Kanone 14 (10 cm K 14) was a field gun used by Germany and Bulgaria in World War I.

== Design ==
The 10 cm Kanone 14 was designed by Krupp and was intended to replace the 10 cm K 04. It was essentially a heavily modified version of the gun it was intended to replace, but it was designed to be able engage targets on the ground and in the air. Its firing platform was intended to give it a fast 360° traverse. Its elevation was 15° greater than the 10 cm K 04, and due to recoil problems associated with firing at high angles, it was designed with a heavy and complicated variable recoil system. To improve its accuracy when employed in the anti-aircraft role, it was fitted with a double elevation sighting system.

== Production ==
It was placed into production on the outbreak of World War I and the first guns had been delivered by May 1915. It was used as a field gun by both Germany and Bulgaria. It could be transported in one load by a team of six horses, with the baseplate carried on the trails. Two batteries worth were modified to be broken down for use in mountainous terrain. Despite the modifications for its intended dual role as an anti-aircraft gun, it proved to be a complete failure in that respect.
