= List of field guns =

Field guns are one of two primary types of field artillery. Guns fire a heavy shell on a relatively level trajectory from a longer barrel, allowing for very high muzzle velocity and good range performance. Guns are most adequate for providing long-range fire support and counter-battery fire.

== Towed field guns ==
Caliber (mm)	Weapon name	Country of origin	Period
45	45 mm m1932 20k	Soviet Union	World war II
53	5.3 cm Fahrpanzer	German Empire	World War I
57	57 mm m1943 ZIS 2	Soviet Union	World War II
57	5.7 cm Maxim-Nordenfelt	United Kingdom	World War I
70	Whitworth rifled breech loader	United Kingdom	American Civil War
80	8 cm Kanone C/80	German Empire	Balkan Wars, World War I
75	Krupp 7.5 cm Model 1903	German Empire	Balkan Wars, World War I, World War II
75	Reffye 75 mm cannon	France	1870–1877
75	Canon de 75 modèle 1897	France	World War I, World War II
75	Saint-Chamond-Mondragón	France	Mexican Revolution, Arab-Israeli War
75	Canon de 75 modèle 1905 Schneider	France	World War I, World War II
75	Canon de 75 modèle 1912 Schneider	France	World War I
75	Canon de 75 modèle 1914 Schneider	France	World War I
75	Canon de 75 modèle 1922 Schneider	France	World War II
75	Canon de 75 mle TR	Belgium	World War I, World War II
75	Canon de 75 mle GP1	Belgium	World War II
75	Canon de 75 mle GP11	Belgium	World War II
75	Canon de 75 mle GP111	Belgium	World War II
75	7-veld & Siderius M 02/04	Netherlands	World War II
75	Armata 75 mm wz.02/26	Poland	World War II
75	Cannone da 75/27 modello 06	Italy	World War I, World War II
75	Cannone da 75/27 modello 11	Italy	World War I, World War II
75	Cannone da 75/27 modello 12	Italy	World War I, World War II
75	Cannone da 75/32 modello 37	Italy	World War II
75	Type 31 75 mm field gun	Japan	Russo-Japanese War
75	Type 38 75 mm field gun	Japan	World War I
75	Type 41 75 mm cavalry gun	Japan	World War I
75	75 mm gun M1916	United States	World War I
75	75 mm gun M1917	United States	World War I
75	75 mm field gun M1897 on M2 carriage	United States	World War II
75	Type 95 75 mm field gun	Japan	2nd Sino-Japanese War
75	Type 63 field gun	Thailand	World War II
75	Type 90 75 mm field gun	Japan	World War II
75	7.5 cm FK 16 nA	Nazi Germany	World War II
75	7.5 cm FK 18	Nazi Germany	World War II
75	7.5 cm FK 38	Nazi Germany	World War II
75	7.5 cm FK 7M85	Nazi Germany	World War II
75	Ehrhardt 7.5 cm Model 1901	Norway	World War II
75	75 mm Reșița Model 1943	Kingdom of Romania	World War II (1944)
75	Škoda 7.5 cm d/29 Model 1911	Austria-Hungary	World War I
75	7,5 cm kanon m/40	Sweden	World War II
75	7,5 cm fältpjäs m/65	Sweden	Cold War
76.2	RBL 12 pounder 8 cwt Armstrong gun	United Kingdom	1860s
76.2	BL 12 pounder 7 cwt gun	United Kingdom	1880s - 1890s
76.2	RML 9 pounder 8 and 6 cwt guns	United Kingdom	1870s
76.2	BL 12-pounder 6 cwt gun	United Kingdom	Second Boer War, World War I
76.2	QF 12-pounder 8 cwt gun	United Kingdom	Second Boer War, World War I
76.2	QF 13-pounder gun	United Kingdom	World War I
76.2	BL 15 pounder 7 cwt gun	United Kingdom	Second Boer War, World War I
76.2	BLC 15-pounder gun	United Kingdom	World War I
76.2	QF 15-pounder Mk.I The Ehrhardt	German Empire	World War I
76.2	3-inch M1902 field gun	United States	1902 – World War I
76.2	3"/21 caliber field gun	United States	1870s
76.2	76 mm gun M1900	Russian Empire	World War I
76.2	76 mm divisional gun M1902	Russian Empire	World War I
76.2	76 mm divisional gun M1902/30	Soviet Union	World War II
76.2	76 mm divisional gun M1933	Soviet Union	World War II
76.2	76 mm divisional gun M1936 (F-22)	Soviet Union	World War II
76.2	76 mm divisional gun M1939 (USV)	Soviet Union	World War II
76.2	76 mm divisional gun M1942 (ZiS-3)	Soviet Union	World War II
76.5	8 cm Feldkanone M. 99	Austria-Hungary	World War I
76.5	8 cm FK M. 5	Austria-Hungary	World War I
76.5	8 cm FK M. 17	Austria-Hungary	World War I, World War II
76.5	8 cm FK M 18	Austria-Hungary	World War I
76.5	8 cm kanon vz. 28	Czechoslovakia	World War II
76.5	8 cm kanon vz. 30	Czechoslovakia	World War II
76.5	Cannone da 77/28 modello 5/8	Italy	World War II
77	7.7 cm FK 96	German Empire	World War I
77	7.7 cm FK 96 n.A.	German Empire	World War I
77	7.7 cm FK 16	German Empire	World War I
77	7.7 cm KiH	German Empire	World War I
78.5	8 cm Kanone C/73	German Empire	1873 - World War I
81	3.2-inch gun M1897	United States	1890s-1910s
83.8	QF 18 pounder gun	United Kingdom	World War I, World War II
85	Reffye 85 mm cannon	France	1870–1877
85	Canon de 85 modèle 1927 Schneider	France	World War II
85	85 mm divisional gun D-44	Soviet Union	Cold War
85	85 mm vz. 52	Czechoslovakia	Cold War
87	87 mm light field gun M1877	Russian Empire	Russo-Japanese War
87	9 cm Feldkanone M 75/96	Austria-Hungary	World War I
88	9 cm Kanone C/73	German Empire	1873- World War I
88	9 cm Kanone C/79	German Empire	1879- World War I
90	De Bange 90mm cannon	France	1877- World War I
95	Lahitolle 95 mm cannon	France	1875- World War I
95.3	RBL 20 pounder Armstrong gun	United Kingdom	1860s-1870s
100	Canon de 100 mm TR mle 1897	France	World War I
100	100 mm field gun M1944 (BS-3)	Soviet Union	World War II
100	100 mm vz. 53	Czechoslovakia	Cold War
104	10.4 cm Feldkanone M. 15	Austria-Hungary	World War I
105	CALIV Cañón Liviano 105L39 105 mm Helitransportable light gun	Argentina	In development
105	Canon de 105 mle 1913 Schneider	France	World War I, World War II
105	Canon de 105 modèle 1925/27 Schneider	France	World War II
105	105 mm Armata wz. 29	France Poland	World War II
105	Canon de 105 modèle 1930 Schneider	France	World War II
105	Canon de 105 L mle 1936 Schneider	France	World War II
105	Cannone da 105/28	Italy	World War I, World War II
105	Indian Field Gun	India	Modern
105	Type 14 10 cm cannon	Japan	2nd Sino-Japanese War
105	Type 38 10 cm cannon	Japan	2nd Sino-Japanese War
105	Type 92 10 cm cannon	Japan	2nd Sino-Japanese War
105	10.5 cm Kanone C/85	German Empire	Balkan Wars, World War I
105	10 cm K 04	German Empire	World War I
105	10 cm K 14	German Empire	World War I
105	10 cm K 17	German Empire	World War I
105	10 cm sK 18	Nazi Germany	World War II
105	10 cm sK 18/40	Nazi Germany	World War II
105	L118 light gun	United Kingdom	Modern
105	LG-1 light gun	France	Modern
105	10,5 cm haubits m/10	Sweden	World War I
105	Bofors 10.5 cm Cannon Model 1927	Sweden	World War II
105	10,5 cm kanon m/34	Sweden	World War II
105	10,5 cm haubits m/40	Sweden	World War II
105	10,5 cm infanterikanon m/45	Sweden	Cold War
105	10.5 cm hruby kanon vz. 35	Czechoslovakia	World War II
107	42-line field gun M1877	Russian Empire	Russo-Japanese War
107	107 mm gun M1910	Russian Empire	World War I
107	107 mm gun M1910/30	Soviet Union	World War II
107	107 mm divisional gun M1940 (M-60)	Soviet Union	World War II
114	4.5-inch Mk II medium	United Kingdom	World War II
114	4.5-inch gun M1	United States	World War II
120	Bofors 12 cm M. 14	Sweden	World War II
120	12 cm rörlig kustartilleripjäs m/80 (KARIN)	Sweden	Cold War
120	Canon de 120 mm modèle 1878	France	World War I, World War II
120	120 mm Armata wz. 78/09/31	Poland	World War II
120	120 mm Schneider-Canet M1897 long gun	France	Balkan Wars, World War I
120	12 cm Kanone C/80	German Empire	World War I
120	12-cm Kanone M 80	Austria-Hungary	World War I
120	120 mm howitzer Model 1901	German Empire	Balkan Wars, World War I, Finnish Civil War, Hungarian–Romanian War
120	Canone de 120 L mle 1931	Belgium	World War II
120	QF 4.7-inch Mk I – IV naval gun	United Kingdom	Second Boer War, World War I
120	4.7-inch gun M1906	United States	World War I
122	122 mm gun M1931 (A-19)	Soviet Union	World War II
122	122 mm gun M1931/37 (A-19)	Soviet Union	World War II
122	D-74 122 mm field gun	Soviet Union	Cold War
122	122 K 60	Finland	Cold War
127	BL 60 pounder gun	United Kingdom	World War I, World War II
127	5-inch gun M1897	United States	World War I
130	130 mm towed field gun M1954 (M-46)	Soviet Union	Cold War
130	Type 59 field gun	People's Republic of China	Cold War
130	130 K 90-60	Finland	Modern
135	Krupp 13.5 cm FK 1909	German Empire	World War I
140	BL 5.5-inch gun	United Kingdom	World War II
145	Canon de 145 L modele 1916 Saint-Chamond	France	World War I, World War II
149.1	15 cm fästningshaubits m/02	Sweden	World War I
149.1	15 cm haubits M/19	Sweden	World War I
149.1	15 cm haubits m/38	Sweden	World War II
149.1	15 cm haubits m/39	Sweden	World War II
149.1	Cannone da 149/23	Italy	World War I
149.1	Cannone da 149/35 A	Italy	World War I, World War II
149.1	Cannone da 149/40 modello 35	Italy	World War II
149.1	Skoda K-series	Czechoslovakia	World War II
149.1	Skoda Model 1928 Gun	Czechoslovakia	World War II
149.1	15 cm Ring Kanone C/72	German Empire	World War I
149.1	15 cm Ring Kanone C/92	German Empire	World War I
149.1	15 cm Ring Kanone L/30	German Empire	World War I
149.1	15 cm L/40 Feldkanone i.R.	German Empire	World War I
149.1	15 cm Kanone 18	Nazi Germany	World War II
149.1	15 cm Kanone 39	Nazi Germany	World War II
149.1	Type 89 15 cm Cannon	Japan	2nd Sino-Japanese War
149.1	Type 96 15 cm cannon	Japan	World War II
149.3	15 cm Kanone 16	German Empire	1917–1945
152	15,2 cm kanon m/37	Sweden	World War II
152.4	15 cm Autokanone M. 15/16	Austria-Hungary	World War I, World War II
152.4	BL 6 inch Mk VII	United Kingdom	World War I
152.4	BL 6-inch gun Mk XIX	United Kingdom	World War I, World War II
152.4	6-inch gun M1903	United States	World War I
152.4	152 mm siege gun M1910	Russian Empire	World War I
152.4	6-inch gun M1917	United States	World War I
152.4	152 mm gun M1910/30	Soviet Union	World War II
152.4	152 mm gun M1910/34	Soviet Union	World War II
152.4	152 mm gun M1935 (Br-2)	Soviet Union	World War II
152.4	152 mm gun 2A36 Giatsint-B, M1976	Soviet Union	Cold War
155	155 mm Creusot Long Tom	France	Second Boer War
155	De Bange 155 mm cannon	France	World War I
155	Canon de 155 L modèle 1877/14 Schneider	France	World War I, World War II
155	Canon de 155 L modele 1916 Saint-Chamond	France	World War I, World War II
155	Canon de 155 L Modele 1917 Schneider	France	World War I, World War II
155	Canon de 155 L modèle 1918 Schneider	France	World War I, World War II
155	Canon de 155 GPF	France	World War I, World War II
155	Canone de 155 L mle 1924	Belgium	World War II
155	155-mm Gun M1, M2, M59 Long Tom	United States	World War II - Korea
155	M198 howitzer	United States	Cold War - Modern
155	Soltam M-68	Israel	Cold War
155	Soltam M-71	Israel	Modern
155	G5 howitzer	South Africa	Modern
155	M777 howitzer	United Kingdom	Modern
155	155 K 83	Finland	Modern
155	155 GH 52 APU	Finland	Modern
155	CITEFA Model 77 155 mm L33 gun	Argentina	Modern
155	CALA 30 155 mm L45 gun	Argentina	Modern
155	FH-70	EU (United Kingdom, Italy, Germany)	Cold War, Modern
155	Norinco WAC-021, W132, PZL-45	People's Republic of China	Cold War
155	Wahrendorff gun	Sweden	pre–World War I
155	Fälthaubits 77	Sweden	Cold War
173	17 cm SK L/40 i.R.L.	German Empire	World War I
173	17 cm Kanone 18 in Mörserlafette	Nazi Germany	World War II
180	180 mm gun S-23	Soviet Union	Cold War
203	8-inch gun M1	United States	World War II
220	Canon de 220 L mle 1917	France	World War I, World War II

== Self-propelled field guns ==
Caliber (mm)	Weapon name	Country of origin	Period
75	T12/M3 75 mm GMC	United States	World War II
75	Sd.Kfz. 234/3 schwerer Panzerspähwagen (7.5cm)	Nazi Germany	World War II
75	Sd.Kfz. 250/8 leichter Schützenpanzerwagen (7.5cm)	Nazi Germany	World War II
75	Sd.Kfz. 251/9 mittlerer Schützenpanzerwagen (7.5cm)	Nazi Germany	World War II
75	Mareșal tank destroyer	Kingdom of Romania	World War II
76.2	SU-5-1	Soviet Union	World War II
76.2	SU-12	Soviet Union	World War II
76.2	SU-18	Soviet Union	World War II
76.2	SU-26	Soviet Union	World War II
76.2	SU-76	Soviet Union	World War II
76.2	TACAM T-60	Kingdom of Romania	World War II
76.2	TACAM R-2	Kingdom of Romania	World War II
84	Birch gun	United Kingdom	1920s
105	FV433 Abbot	United Kingdom	Cold War
122	PLZ-89	People's Republic of China	Modern
149	Semovente 149/40	Italy	World War II
152	Gun Carrier Mark I	United Kingdom	World War I
155	Bandkanon 1	Sweden	Cold War
155	Archer artillery system	Sweden	Modern
155	M12 gun motor carriage	United States	World War II
155	M40 gun motor carriage	United States	World War II
155	M53 155 mm self-propelled gun	United States	Cold War
155	G6 howitzer	South Africa	Modern
155	XM1203 NLOS cannon	United States	Future Combat Systems
155	Norinco SP gun	People's Republic of China	
155	PLZ-45	People's Republic of China	Modern
155	Bhim T-6 self-propelled gun	India	Modern
155	TAM VCA	Argentina	Modern
175	M107 self-propelled gun	United States	Cold War
194	Canon de 194 mle GPF	France	World War I - 1930s
203	T93 gun motor carriage	United States	post World War II
240	T92 howitzer motor carriage	United States	post World War II
203	M110 gun motor carriage	United States	post World War II
203	M43 howitzer motor carriage	United States	World War II

== Bibliography ==
- Gander, Terry & Chamberlain, Peter (1979). Weapons of the Third Reich: An Encyclopedic Survey of All Small Arms, Artillery and Special Weapons of the German Land Forces 1939-1945. New York: Doubleday. ISBN 0-385-15090-3.
