= M1906 =

M1906 may refer to:

- .30-06 Springfield ammunition, or "M1906"
- 4.7-inch gun M1906
- M1906 Guttekarabin variant of the Krag–Jørgensen
- FN Baby Browning, or "M1906"
- M1906 pistol by Webley & Scott
