= 8 cm Feldkanone M. 99 =

- Type: Field gun
- Place of origin: Austria-Hungary

Service history
- In service: 1901–1918
- Used by: Austria-Hungary
- Wars: World War I

Production history
- Designed: 1899–1901

Specifications
- Mass: 915 kg (2,017 lb) (w/o equipment)
- Barrel length: 2.142 m (7 ft) L/28
- Shell: separate-loading, bagged charge and projectile
- Caliber: 76.5 mm (3.01 in)
- Breech: Eccentric Interrupted screw
- Carriage: Box trail
- Traverse: none
- Rate of fire: 6–8 rpm
- Muzzle velocity: 500 m/s (1,600 ft/s)
- Maximum firing range: 8,000 m (8,700 yd)

The 8 cm Feldkanone M. 99 was a field gun used by Austria-Hungary in World War I. It was designed in a rush because Austria's neighbors had already begun the process of modernizing their artillery. The designers whatever improvements they could be made without delaying development. For example, various hydraulic recoil systems were evaluated, but ultimately rejected as they required more development time than was available. So the M. 99 retained the so-called steel bronze (see Franz von Uchatius) barrel of its predecessor, but used an eccentric interrupted-screw breech to speed up its rate of fire, and adopted the carriage of the 9 cm Feldkanone M 75/96 with some minor changes, including improvements to the spade brake to reduce recoil forces.

== Bibliography ==
- Ortner, M. Christian. The Austro-Hungarian Artillery From 1867 to 1918: Technology, Organization, and Tactics. Vienna, Verlag Militaria, 2007 ISBN 978-3-902526-13-7
