= 8 cm FK M. 17 =

8 cm Feldkanone M. 17
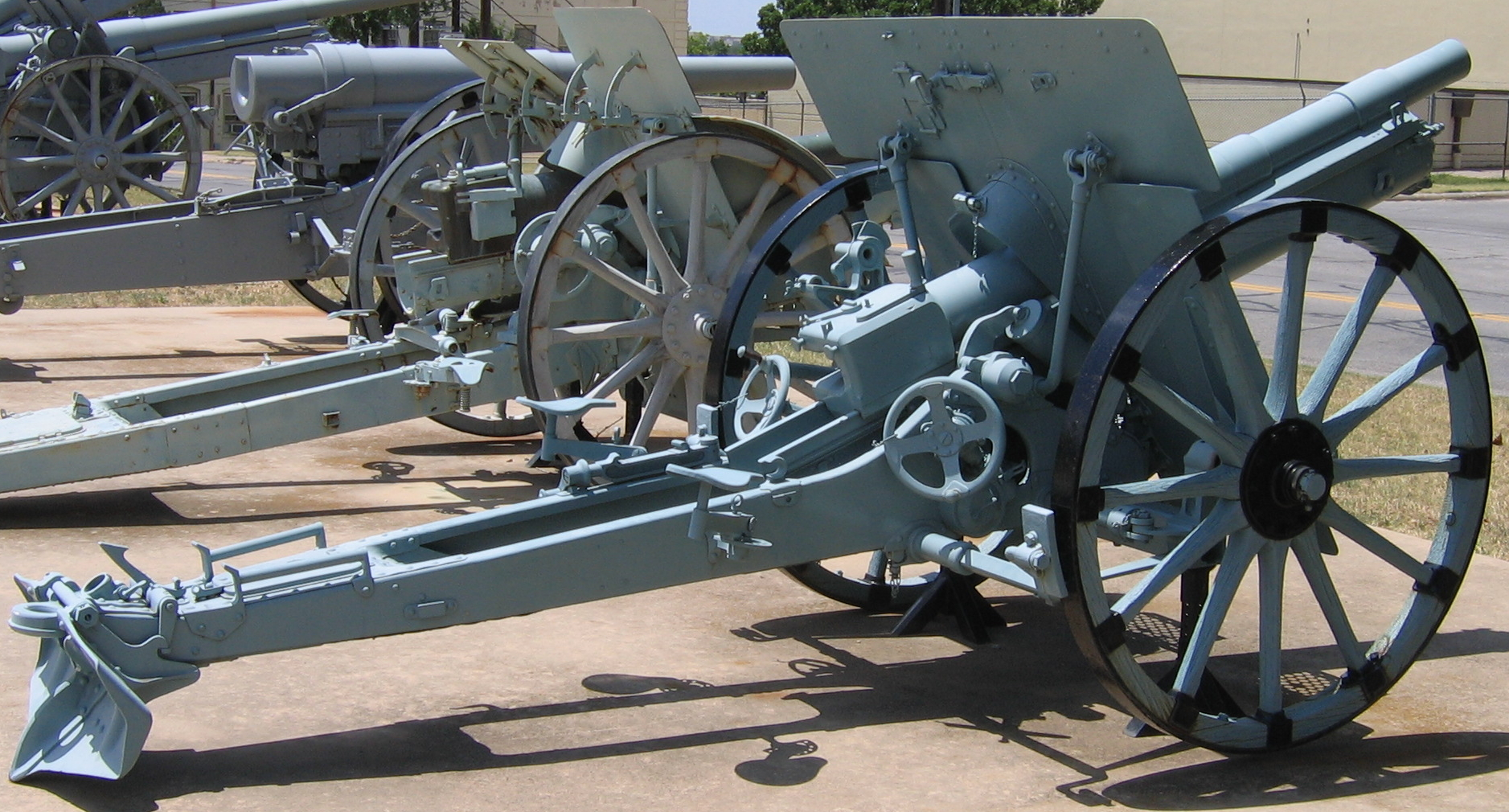
- An 8 cm Feldkanone M. 17 at the U.S. Army Field Artillery Museum, Ft. Sill, OK
- Type: Field gun
- Place of origin: Austria-Hungary

Service history
- In service: 1917–1945
- Used by: Austria-Hungary; Austria; Czechoslovakia; Nazi Germany; Poland; Romania; Yugoslavia
- Wars: World War I World War II

Production history
- Manufacturer: Skoda
- Produced: 1917–1937

Specifications
- Mass: 1,319 kg (2,980 lbs)
- Length: 2.297 m (7 ft 6 in)
- Barrel length: 2.078 m (6 ft 10 in) L/30
- Shell: Fixed QF 76.5 x 233mm R 8 kg (18 lb)
- Caliber: 76.5 mm (3 in)
- Breech: horizontal sliding-block
- Carriage: Box trail
- Elevation: -10° to +45°
- Traverse: 8°
- Rate of fire: 10-12 rpm
- Muzzle velocity: 554 m/s (1,817 ft/s)
- Effective firing range: 11,400 m (12,467 yds)

The 8 cm Feldkanone M. 17 was a dual-purpose field and mountain gun used by Austria-Hungary during World War I. Between the wars it was used by Austria, Czechoslovakia, Romania and Yugoslavia. Captured weapons were used by Nazi Germany under the designations 7.65 cm FK 17(ö) or (t) and 7.65 cm FK 303(j).

The M.17 was developed with the idea of replacing the 8 cm FK M. 5. Skoda works received the specifications in 1915, at which time they were already working on their own designs. While originally envisioned with 80mm and 83.5mm barrels (and prototypes were tested with those), the 76.5mm barrel was chosen for production to better standardize munitions. After trials and further refining in 1918, the gun was adopted in 1919 with an order for 800 pieces, which were delivered to troops that same year. Production continued from January 1919 to 1921, and further pieces were completed in 1924-1925 and 1937-1938 with modernization modifications being made in the 1920s. It was eventually supplanted by the 8 cm kanon vz. 30.

It was a conventional design, albeit with some unique characteristics. The carriage was mounted on a double-crank, curved axle which made it lower to the ground, reducing visibility and improving stability. The curved axle allowed the weapon to traverse without movement of the wheels, although traverse was still limited by the need to prevent the recoiling barrel from hitting the carriage. In addition the spade was pivot-mounted allowing the weapon to traverse without disturbing the spade. This movement of the carriage without moving the wheels or spade produced a very accurate weapon.

The cannoneers rode standing on steps in front of the shield rather than sitting in seats attached to the shield, as was normal for the period. It was pulled by three pairs of horses when attached to its limber. The carriage could be broken down into three loads (tandem hitch) for transport in rough terrain.

== Bibliography ==
- Englemann, Joachim and Scheibert, Horst. Deutsche Artillerie 1934-1945: Eine Dokumentation in Text, Skizzen und Bildern: Ausrüstung, Gliderung, Ausbildung, Führung, Einsatz. Limburg/Lahn, Germany: C. A. Starke, 1974
- Gander, Terry and Chamberlain, Peter. Weapons of the Third Reich: An Encyclopedic Survey of All Small Arms, Artillery and Special Weapons of the German Land Forces 1939-1945. New York: Doubleday, 1979 ISBN 0-385-15090-3
