= BL 6-inch gun Mk XIX =

United Kingdom heavy field gun

Ordnance BL 6-inch gun Mk XIX
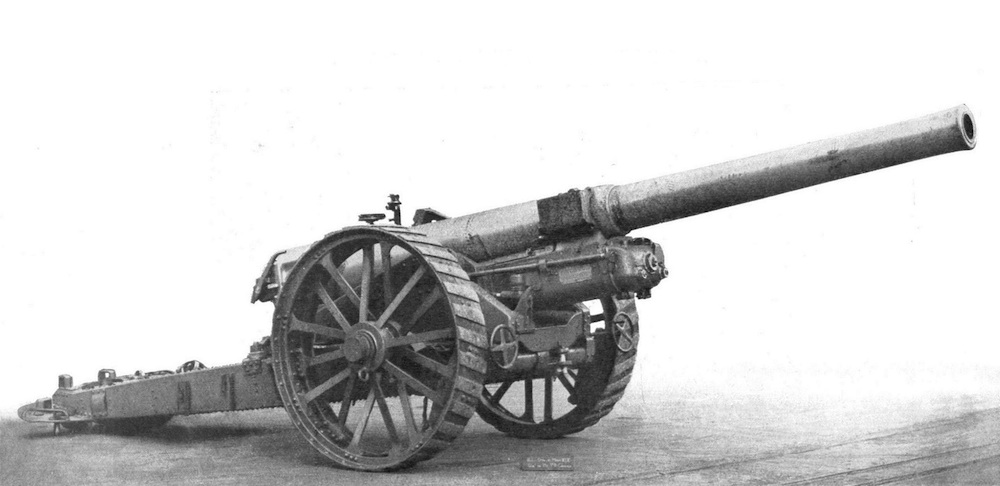
- BL 6-inch gun Mk XIX
- Type: Heavy field gun
- Place of origin: United Kingdom

Service history
- In service: 1916–1960
- Used by: United Kingdom; United States; Brazil; Union of South Africa
- Wars: World War I, World War II

Production history
- Manufacturer: Vickers
- No. built: 310

Specifications
- Mass: 10,248 lb (4,684 kg) (gun & breech); 10 tons 3½ cwt (10,340 kg) (total)
- Barrel length: 35 calibres
- Shell: HE 100 lb (45 kg)
- Calibre: 6 in (152 mm)
- Breech: Welin interrupted screw with Asbury mechanism
- Recoil: Hydro pneumatic, variable
- Carriage: Wheeled, box trail
- Elevation: 0° to 38°
- Traverse: 4° L & R
- Muzzle velocity: 2,350 ft/s (720 m/s)
- Maximum firing range: 16,500 yd (15,100 m) (2 crh shell); 17,800 yd (16,300 m) (4 crh shell); 18,750 yd (17,140 m) (6 crh shell)

The British BL 6-inch gun Mk XIX (Note: I.e. Mark 19 : Britain at the time designated Marks (models) of ordnance using Roman numerals. This was a field gun and field ordnance normally used a different Mark series to naval ordnance, but unusually the next available Mark number in the 6-inch naval gun series was used, rather than Mark I as the first 6-inch BL field gun.) was introduced in 1916 as a lighter and longer-range field gun replacement for the obsolescent BL 6-inch gun Mk VII.

== History, description ==
The majority of military planners before the First World War were wedded to the concept of fighting an offensive war of rapid maneuver which in a time before mechanization meant a focus on cavalry and light horse artillery firing shrapnel shells. Although the majority of combatants had heavy field artillery prior to the outbreak of the First World War, none had adequate numbers of heavy guns in service, nor had they foreseen the growing importance of heavy artillery once the Western Front stagnated and trench warfare set in. The theorists had not foreseen that trenches, barbed wire, and machine guns had robbed them of the mobility they had been counting on and like in the Franco-Prussian War and Russo-Turkish War the need for heavy artillery reasserted itself. Since aircraft of the period were not yet capable of carrying large diameter bombs the burden of delivering heavy firepower fell on the artillery. The combatants scrambled to find anything that could fire a heavy shell and that meant emptying the fortresses and scouring the depots for guns held in reserve. It also meant converting coastal artillery and surplus naval guns to field guns by either giving them simple field carriages or mounting the larger pieces on rail carriages.

The Mk XIX was designed and built by Vickers specifically as a field gun, unlike its predecessors which originated as naval guns. Its length was reduced from the 45 calibres of its naval gun predecessors to 35 calibres, to reduce weight and improve mobility. The Mk XIX was a typical British built-up gun of the period constructed of steel with a central rifled tube reinforced with braided wire wound around the liner, a protective outer jacket, breech bush and breech ring.

The Mk XIX was a breech-loaded design with a Welin interrupted screw breech and used separate-loading, bagged charges and projectiles. "The breech mechanism is operated by means of a lever on the right side of the breech. On pulling the lever to the rear the breech screw is automatically unlocked and swung into the loading position. After loading, one thrust of the lever inserts the breech screw and turns it into the locked position. The breech mechanism is similar to that used on the 8-inch howitzers both in design and operation".

The Mk XIX utilized the same carriage and recoil mechanism as the BL 8-inch howitzer Mk VI. The carriage was a box trail with two large spoked steel wheels, a hydro-pneumatic recoil mechanism, and no gun shield. The carriages had an opening behind the breech to allow high angles of elevation. Due to the weight of the gun, it could not be towed by a horse team and had to be towed by a traction engine or artillery tractor instead. The Mk XIX was most often used for long-range counter battery fire.

== Operational history ==
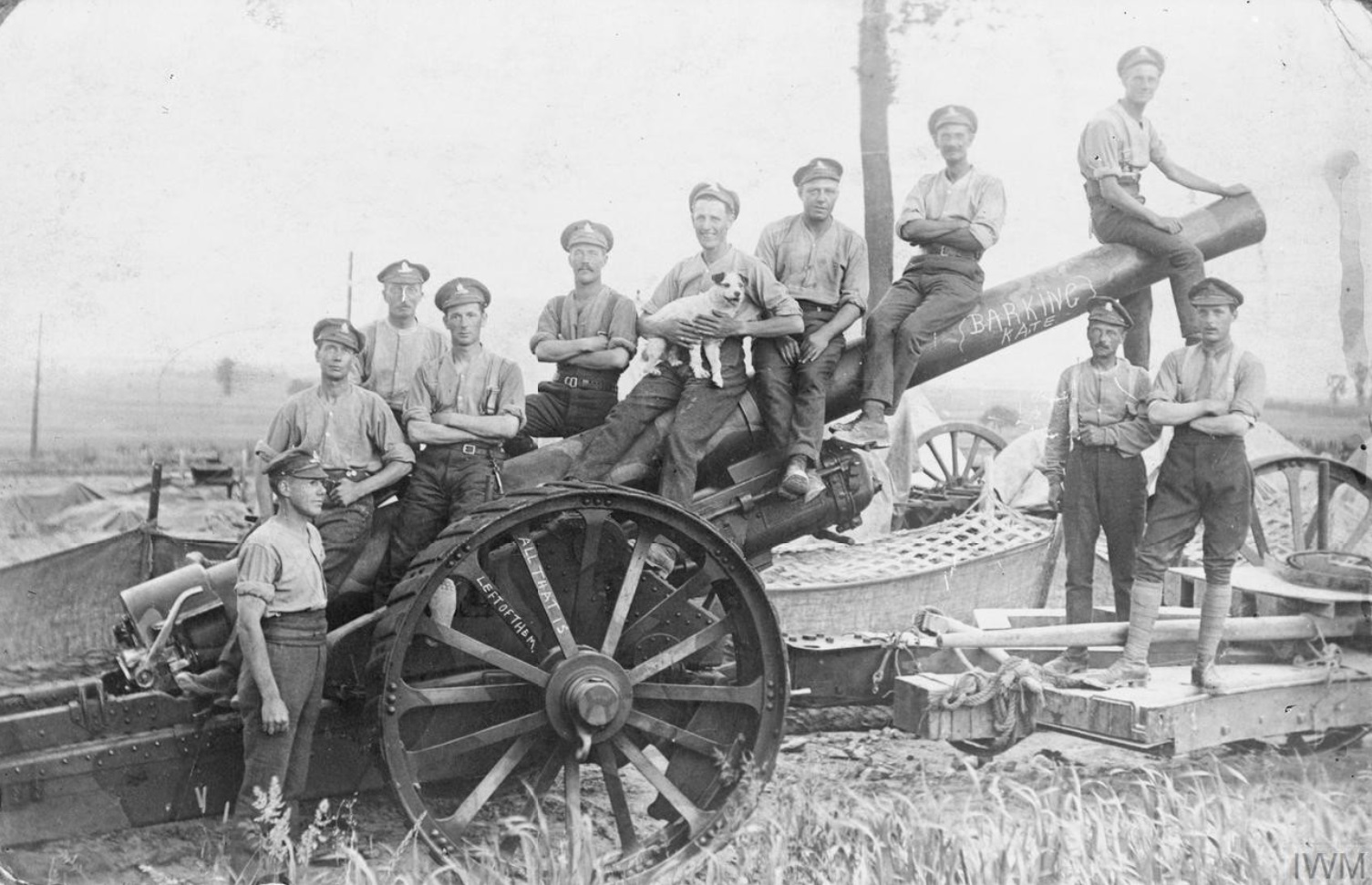
BL 6-inch Mk XIX gun of 484th Siege Battery Royal Garrison Artillery.

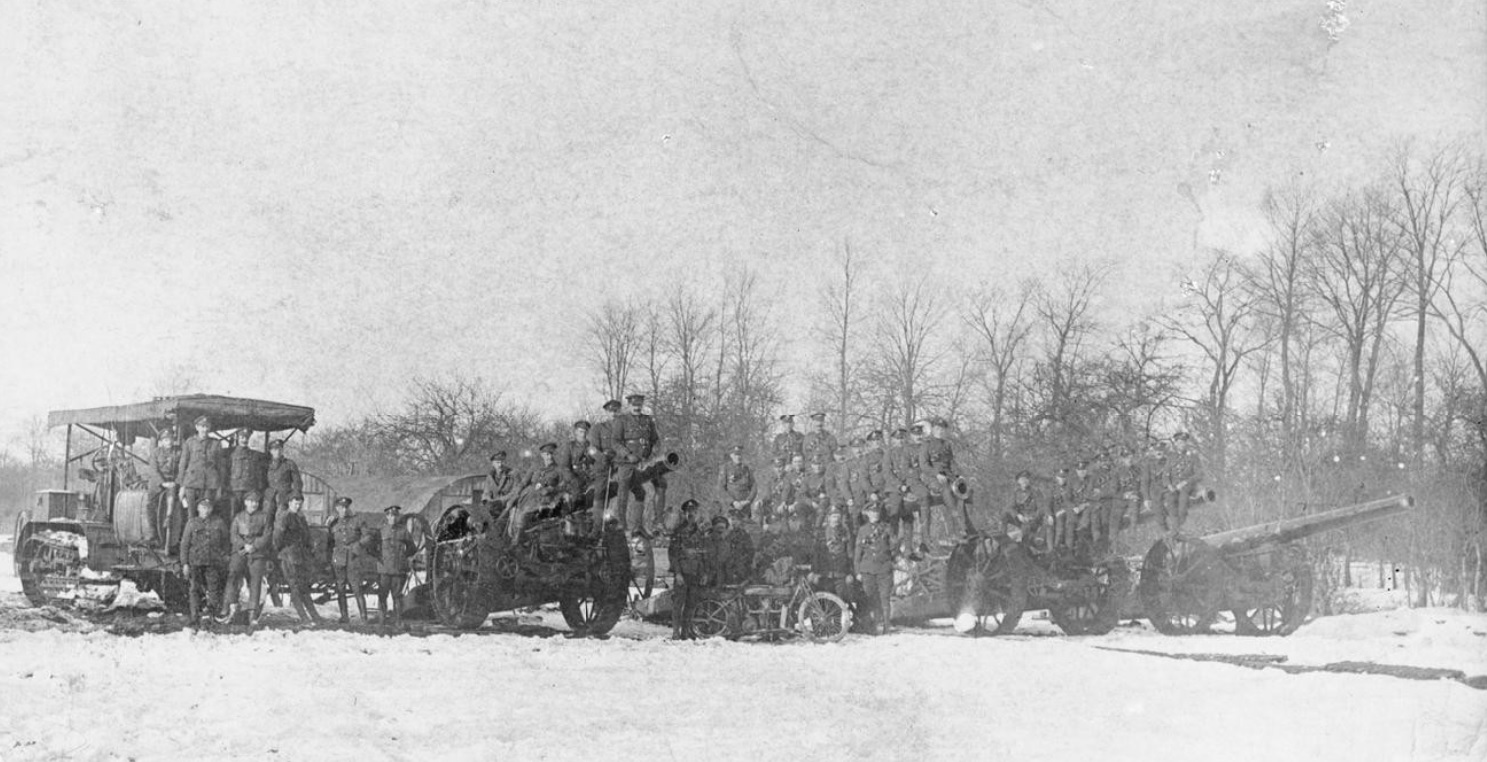
Battery of four BL 6-inch Mk XIX guns

=== Great Britain ===
310 were built during World War I and the gun served in all theaters, with 108 being in service on the Western front at the end of World War I, but it did not completely replace the Mk VII gun until the end of the war.

3 batteries served with the BEF in France early in World War II, and others were deployed in the home defense of Britain. The gun was superseded by the 155-mm Gun M1, and the carriages used for BL 7.2-inch howitzer

=== United States ===
When the United States entered the First World War it had a need for long-range heavy artillery, so guns produced for the US Army were given the designation 6-inch gun M1917. In some US sources the Mark XIX designation was also used. 100 weapons were acquired from the British by the US Army beginning in 1917, along with 50 "gun bodies", presumably as spare barrels. Deliveries were not completed until after March 1920. The carriage was slightly modified from the British BL 8-inch howitzer carriage Mark VII, and was called the 6-inch gun carriage Mark VIIIA.

The US Army Ordnance Department's "Handbook of Artillery" of May 1920 stated that:

"The original British ammunition so closely resembled the American that it was decided to use the [US] regular Mark II high-explosive shell... the propellant charge will consist of a base section and increment section having a total weight of approximately 25 pounds".

In the interwar period, 6-inch gun regiments were assigned to "Medium & Heavy" field artillery brigades, part of the General Headquarters Reserve. Constituted in the Organized Reserve, various limitations meant that the regiments consisted of almost exclusively officers and lacked assigned heavy equipment, with training largely limited to the theoretical. By 1933 the 99 stored weapons, with 51 spare tubes, had no ammunition available. Although consideration was given to producing 6-inch ammunition or modifying the guns to use standard 155 mm ammunition, no action was taken and the guns remained in storage.

=== Brazil ===
Before the United States entered World War II, the US Army declared the M1917 obsolete and the 99 complete guns were transferred to Brazil as part of a package of military aid in exchange for bases, with deliveries beginning in October 1940. The United States assisted Brazil in producing ammunition for the guns. In 1941, the United States began supplying Brazil with replacement wheels and pneumatic tires to allow the guns to be towed at higher speeds. They were used by Brazil as coastal artillery until the 1960s when they were retired from service. In Brazil they were sometimes used on circular concrete platforms, similar to the "Panama mounts" used for towed 155 mm guns in US installations. As of 2016, around a dozen guns remained in museums and as memorials in Brazil and elsewhere, although none in the United States.

=== South Africa ===
Prior to the outbreak of World War II, the Union Defence Force had planned to use these guns in the fortification of Durban, Cape Town and Saldanha Bay.

For a short period, two guns were deployed for the protection of Port Elizabeth harbor at the outbreak of World War II.

== Photo gallery ==
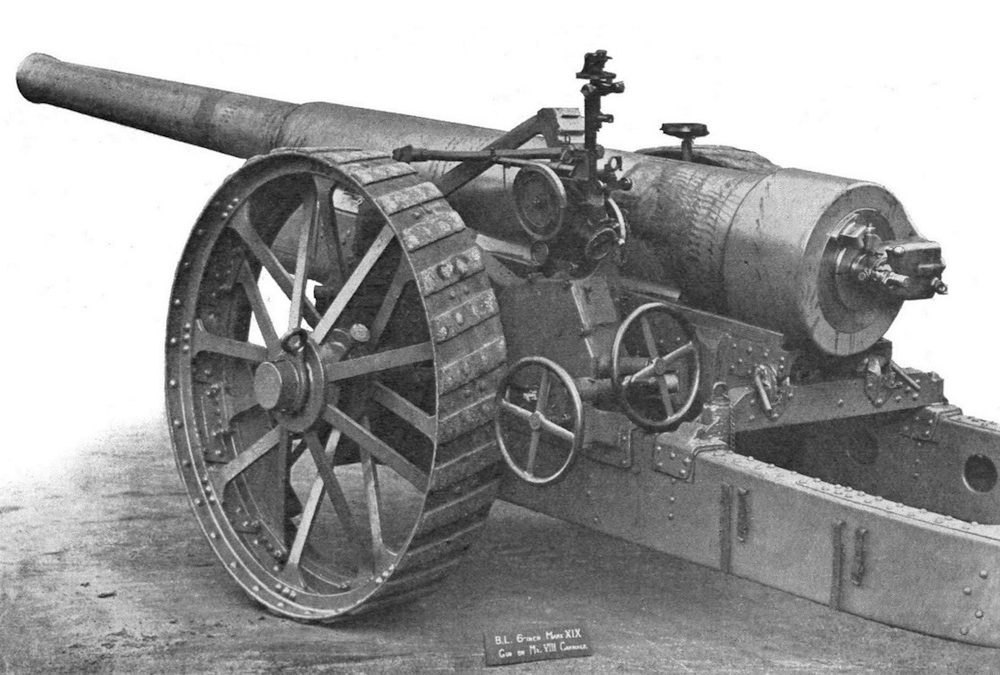
Rear left view

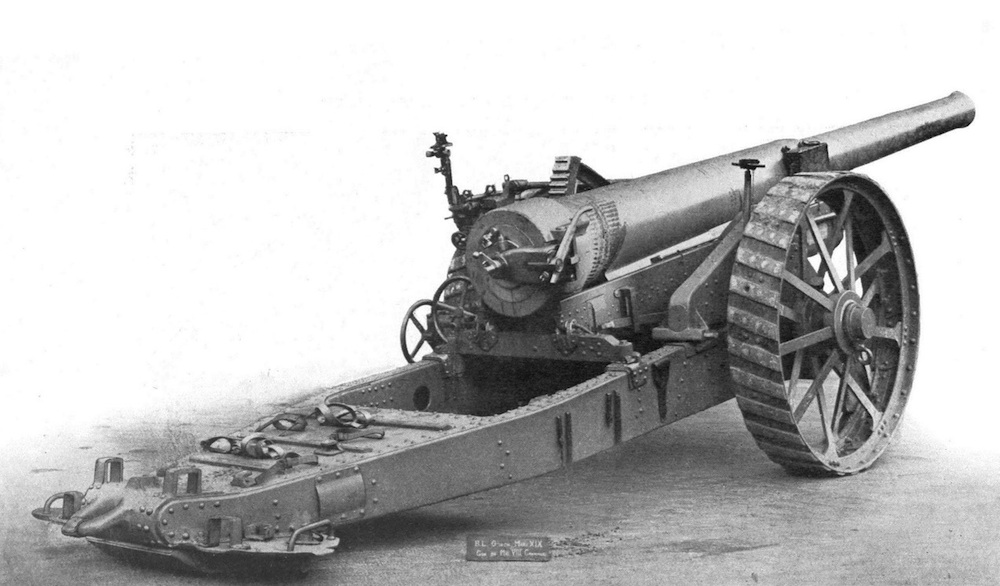
Rear right view

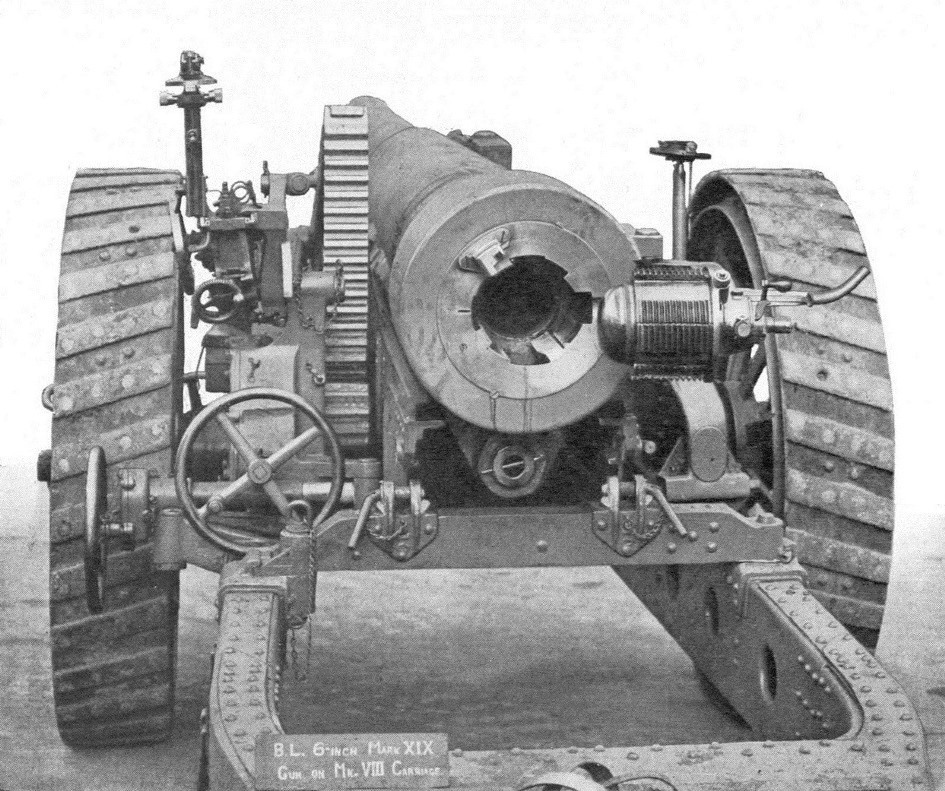
Breech

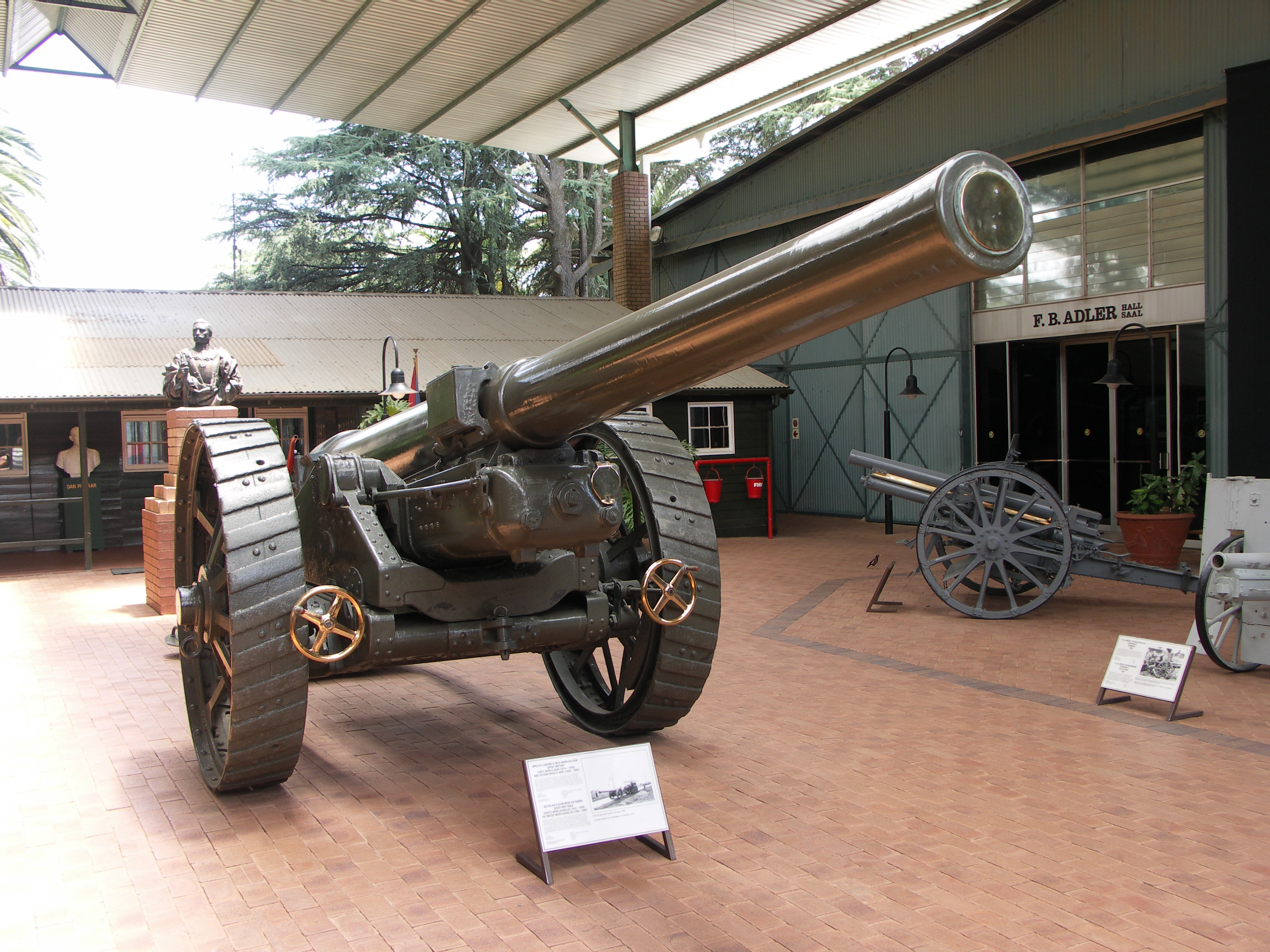
Example at the South African National Museum of Military History.

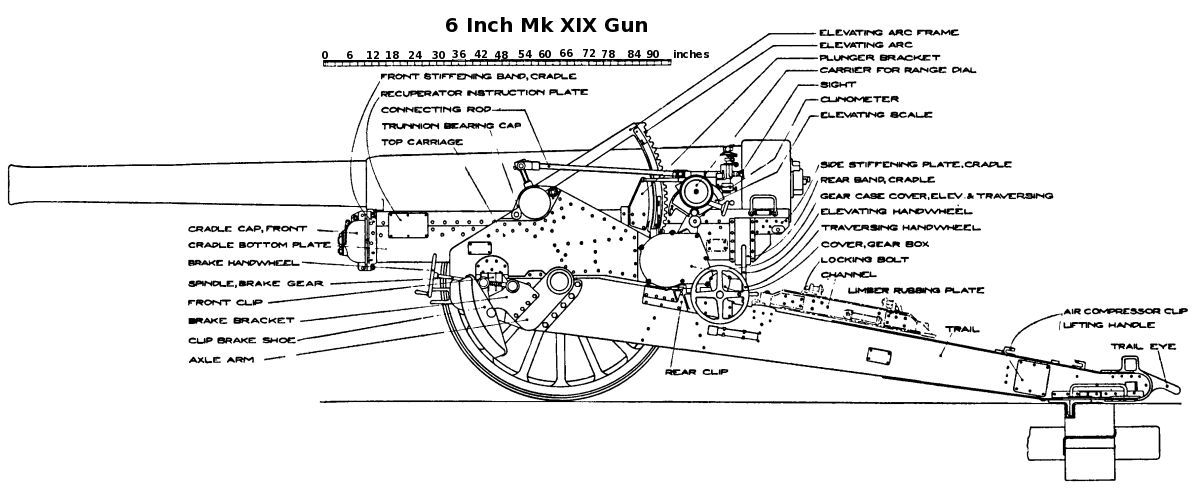
Diagram showing left elevation.

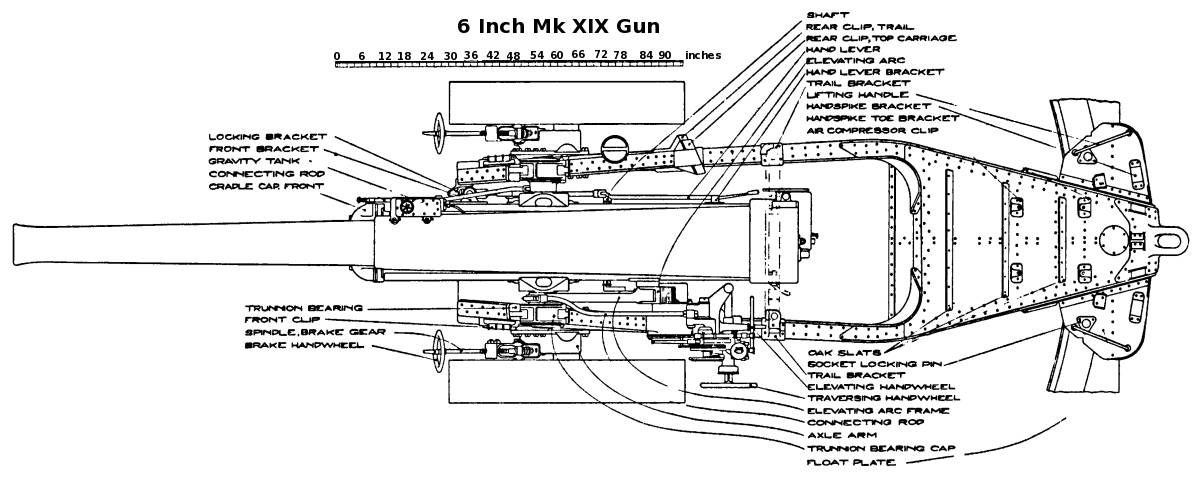
Diagram showing plan.

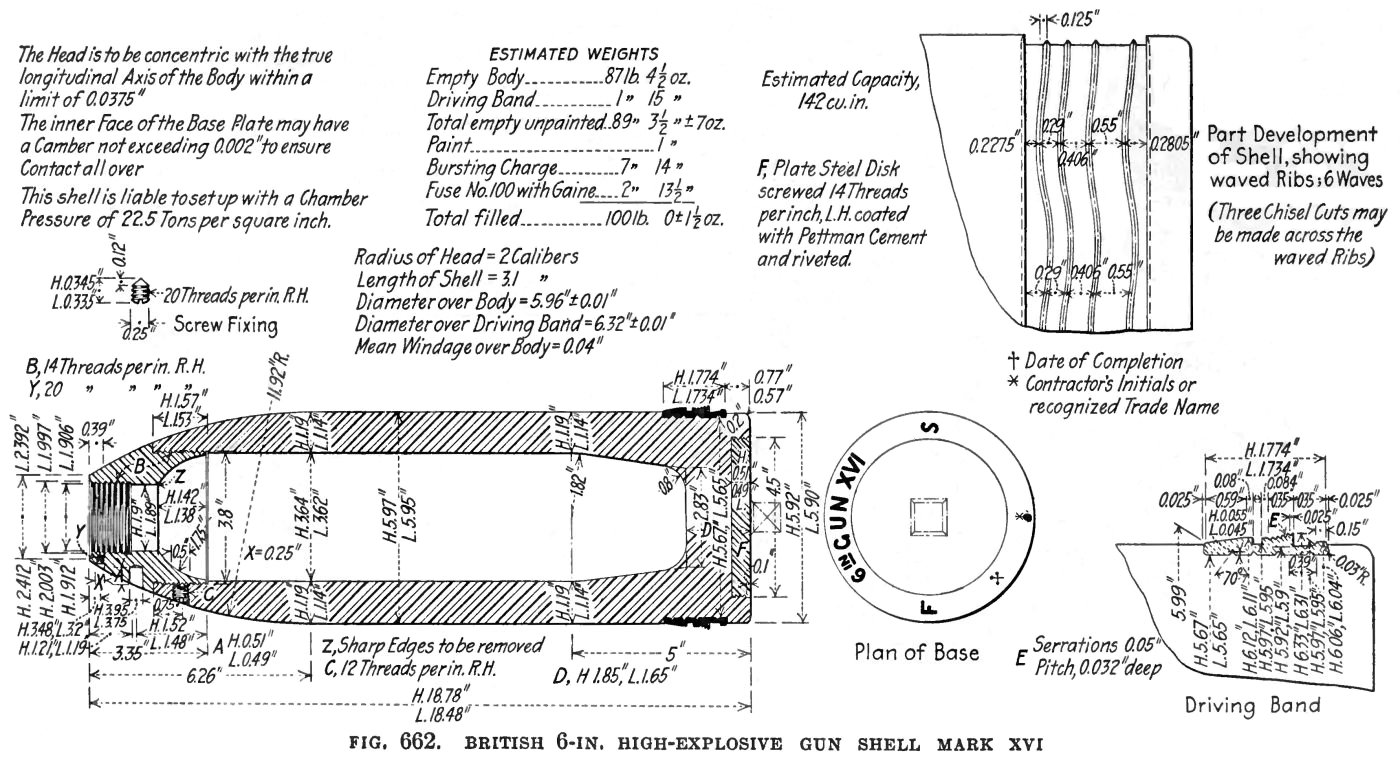
British Mk XVI HE shell, WWI.

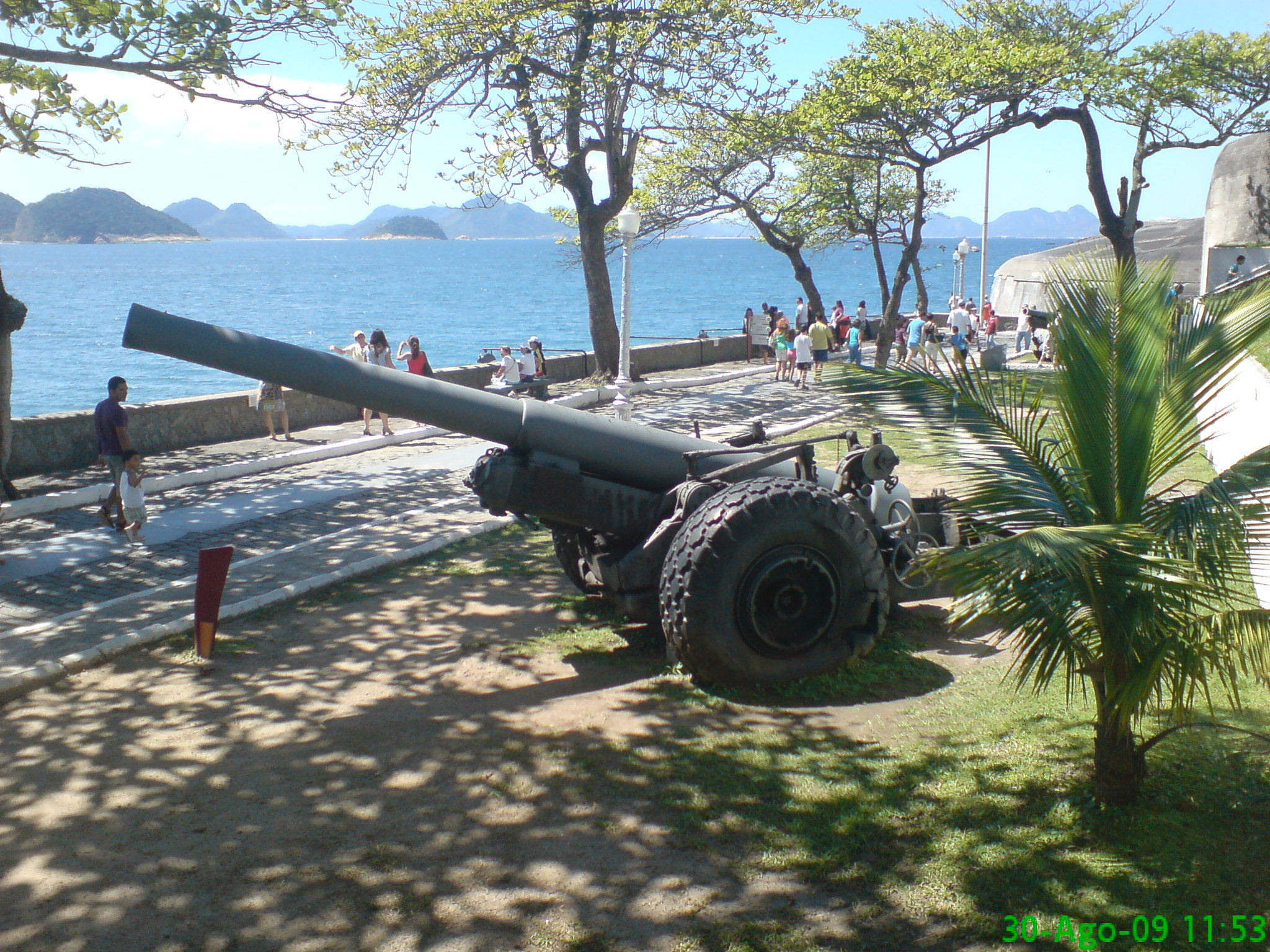
Example at the Brazilian Army museum, Copacabana.

== See also ==
- List of field guns

=== Weapons of comparable role, performance and era ===
- Canon de 155 mm GPF French equivalent
- 15 cm Kanone 16 German equivalent

== Bibliography ==
- I.V. Hogg & L.F. Thurston, British Artillery Weapons & Ammunition 1914–1918. London: Ian Allan, 1972. ISBN 978-0-7110-0381-1
- Dale Clarke, British Artillery 1914–1919. Heavy Artillery. Osprey Publishing, Oxford UK, 2005 ISBN 978-1-84176-788-8
- Handbook of artillery: including mobile, anti-aircraft and trench matériel (1920), United States Army Ordnance Dept, May 1920
- Lewis, E. R. & Robbins, C. B. (2004). "Brazi's Coast Defense Rearmament, 1939–1945". Warship International. XLI (1): 52–53. ISSN 0043-0374.
