= 3-inch/21-caliber field gun =

3 Inch / 21 Caliber Field Gun
- Type: Field gun; Naval gun
- Place of origin: United States

Service history
- Used by: US Navy; US Marine Corps

Production history
- Designed: 1874
- Produced: 1875 –

Specifications
- Mass: 384 pounds (174 kg)
- Length: 69.6 inches (1.77 m)
- Barrel length: 64.3 inches (1.63 m) bore (21 calibres)
- Shell: 13 pounds (5.9 kg) (projectile)
- Caliber: 3-inch (76 mm)
- Breech: Fletcher breech mechanism
- Recoil: hydraulic recoil piston
- Carriage: Wheeled
- Rate of fire: 8 – 9 rounds per minute
- Muzzle velocity: 1,150 feet per second (350 m/s)
- Effective firing range: 5,000 yards (4,600 m) at 19.5° elevation

The 3"/21 caliber gun (spoken "three-inch-twenty-one-caliber") was a field gun for United States Navy and United States Marine Corps. They were a simple horse-drawn artillery gun that were mostly used by the Marines. The guns have also been described as Boat Guns but information on type of mounts has not been found.

== Description ==
The Mark 1 was intended as a support gun for landing operations. It was of simple monobloc construction with a Fletcher breech mechanism with down swinging carrier, and used a hydraulic recoil piston that was screwed onto the gun directly. It most likely used bagged ammunition with a 13 pounds (5.9 kg) projectile at a velocity of 1,150 feet per second (350 m/s). Range was 5,000 yards (4,600 m) at 19.5 degree s of elevation.

== Surviving pieces ==
Guns No. 5 and 6, built in 1875, had been restored and were located in St. Clair, Pennsylvania as of 2004.
