= 8 cm FK M. 5 =

Austria-Hungary manufactured field gun

8 cm Feldkanone M.5
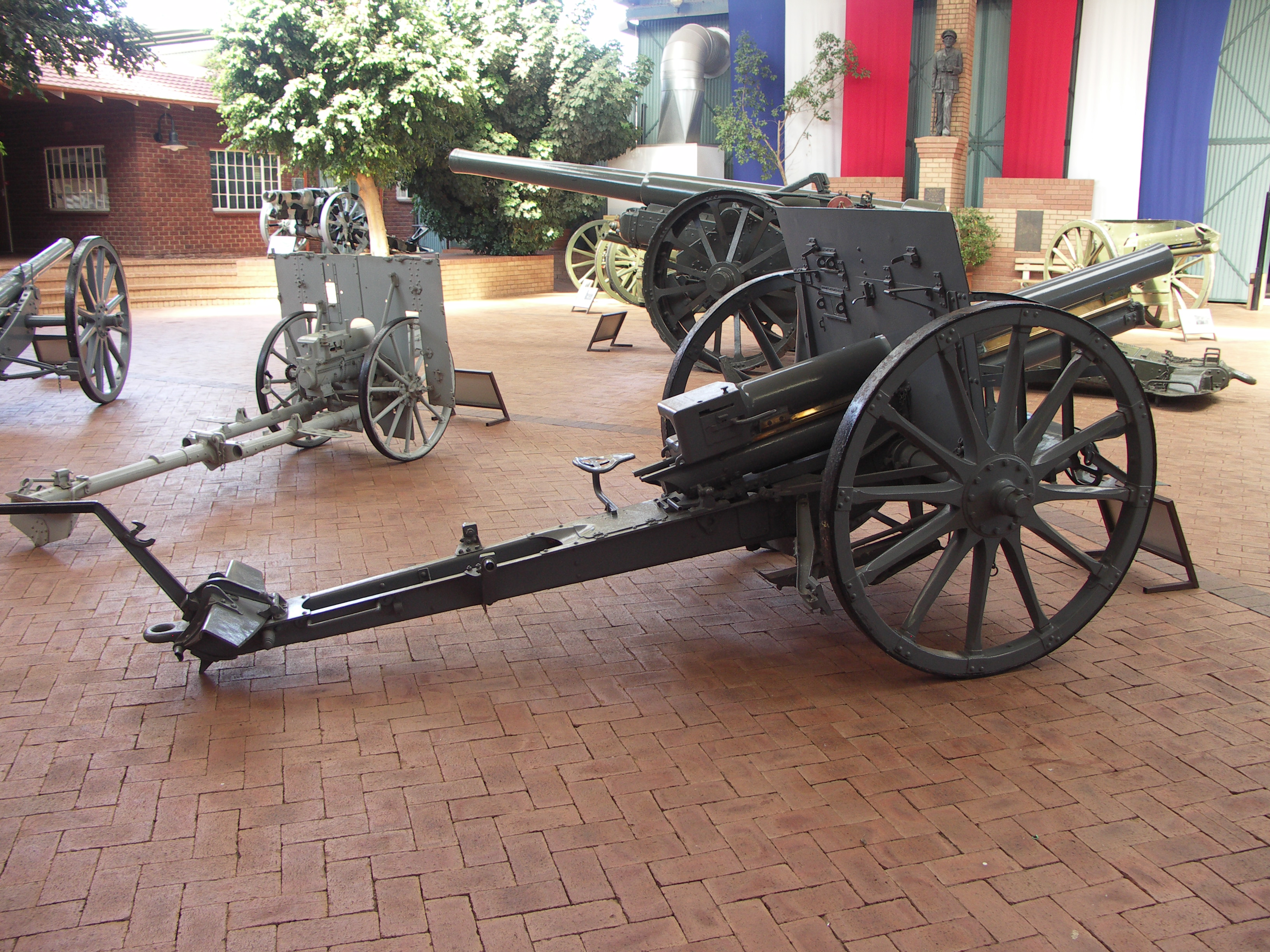
- FK M. 5/8 in the South African National Museum of Military History
- Type: Field gun
- Place of origin: Austria-Hungary

Service history
- In service: 1907–1945
- Used by: Austria-Hungary; Austria; Czechoslovakia; Nazi Germany; Hungary; Italy; Yugoslavia
- Wars: World War I Second Italo-Ethiopian War; World War II

Production history
- Designer: Škoda
- Designed: 1901–1905
- Manufacturer: Škoda
- Produced: 1907–1918?
- Variants: M 5/08; M 5/8 MP

Specifications
- Mass: 1,065 kg (2,348 lb)
- Barrel length: 2.285 m (7 ft 6 in) L/30
- Shell: Fixed QF 76.5 x 283mm R
- Shell weight: 6.68 kg (14 lb 12 oz)
- Caliber: 76.5 mm (3 in)
- Breech: horizontal sliding-block
- Recoil: hydro-spring
- Carriage: Box trail
- Elevation: M 5/8: -7° 30' to +18° M 5/8 MP: -5° to +73°
- Traverse: M 5/8: 7° 52'; M 5/8 MP: 360°
- Rate of fire: 8-10 rpm
- Muzzle velocity: 500 m/s (1,600 ft/s)
- Effective firing range: M 05/08: 6.1 km (3.8 mi); M 5/8 MP: 3.9 km (13,000 ft) AA ceiling
- Maximum firing range: 7 km (4.3 mi)

The 8 cm Feldkanone M.5 was a field gun used by Austria-Hungary during World War I. It was a conventional design, with its most notable feature being its obsolescent autofrettaged bronze (so-called steel-bronze, see Franz von Uchatius) barrel, necessary because Austria-Hungary still had trouble making steel of the proper quality.

== History ==
Austrians took years to decide on the proper recoil system of their new light field gun amid the so-called "quick-firing revolution", and the type of its breech. At the turn of the 20th century Austro-Hungarian light field artillery was armed with a slightly upgraded design from mid-1870s, the 9 cm Feldkanone M 75/96 (classified as "accelerated fire" at the time due to a spring-mounted spade brake reducing but not eliminating recoil of the carriage). The German military was concerned that their closest ally may be outgunned, and after consulting with both Krupp and Ehrhardt, Austria bought the rights for the QF gun of the latter company. Even then production difficulties prevented its introduction into service until 1907.

== Users ==
In addition to being used by Austria-Hungary during World War I the M.5/8 was widely used by its successor states after the war. Guns captured by Italy were used in both World War I and World War II as the Cannone da 77/28 modello 5/8 and the Cannone da 77/28 C.A. (from contraereo meaning anti-aircraft). Weapons captured by Nazi Germany were used under the designations 7.65 cm FK 5/8(ö), 7.65 cm FK 5/8(t), 7.65 cm FK 5/8(j) or 7.65 cm FK 300(j), 7.65 cm FK 300(i) and 7.65 cm Flak 268/1(i) depending on which country they were taken from eg Östereich = Austria, tschechisch from Czech, Italienisch from Italy.

== Variants ==
The M.5 was adapted for use in narrow mountain paths as the M.5/8 and could be disassembled into three loads. The base of the barrel was given lifting grips to speed its removal from the carriage and the carriage itself was modified to allow it to be disassembled. Later M.5/8 barrels were made out of steel and full length axles of cast steel were available for use in its field gun configuration as found on an example rescued from a Dutch barn. This gun was also fitted with German army standard wooden wheels that differ from Austrian military standard through the lack of metal lugs on the spoke ends.

=== Anti-aircraft ===
In addition to its field gun and mountain gun roles the M.5/8 was also adapted to an anti-aircraft role by placing the gun on a high-angle pedestal mount with 360 ° traverse and firing shrapnel shell. In this form it was named "8 cm Luftfahrzeugabwehr-Kanone M 5/8 Mittelpivotlafette." The Italians also had an anti-aircraft version of the M 05/08 called the Cannone da 77/28 C.A. (contraereo). Despite its obsolescence it was deployed by Italian home guard units during World War II for static anti-aircraft defense and those captured by Germany after the Italian armistice in 1943 were given the designation 7.65 cm Flak 268/1(i). There were also anti-aircraft versions of the M.5/8 in use with Czechoslovakia and Yugoslavia.

== Gallery ==
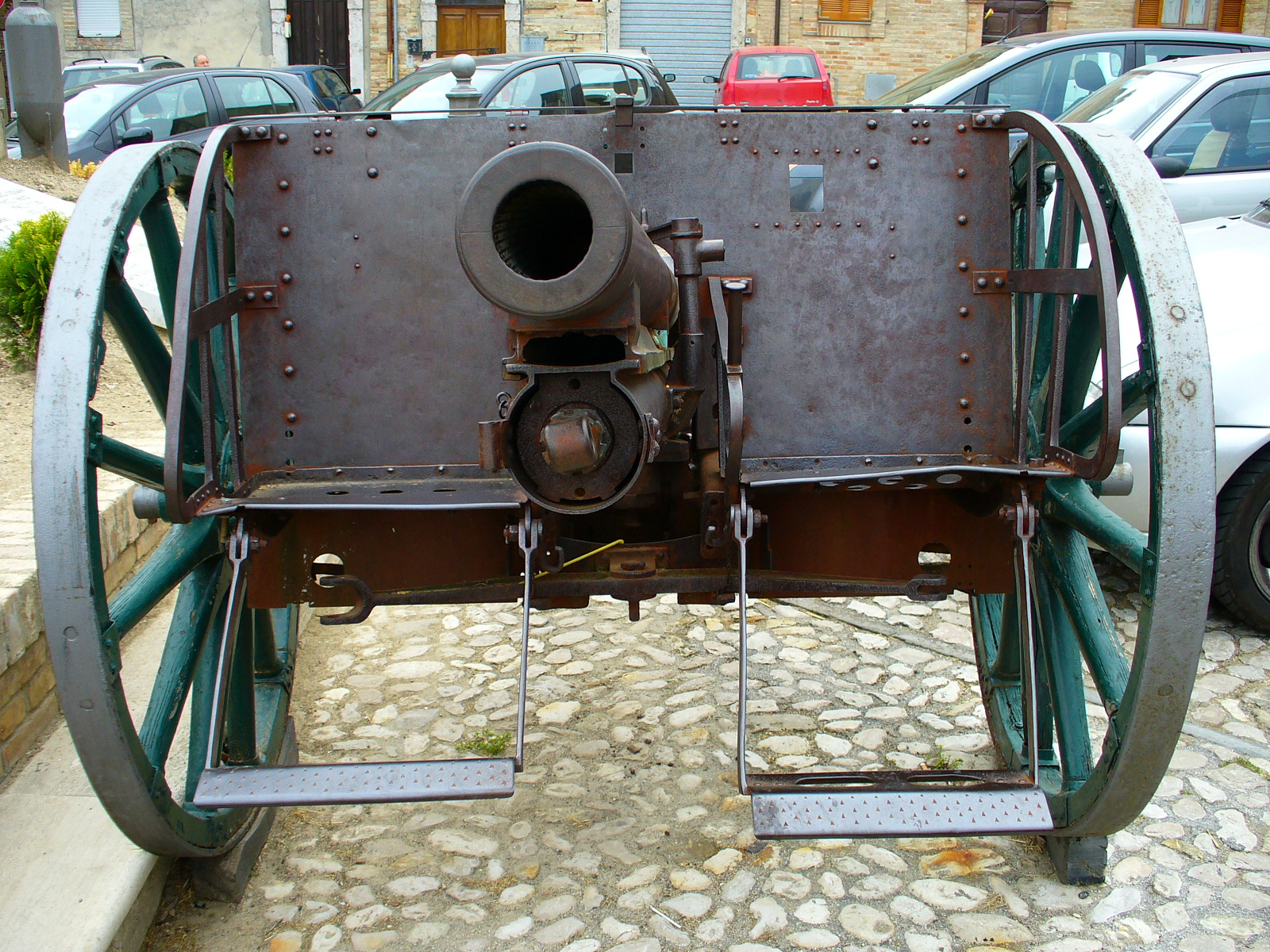
An 8 cm FK M5 cannon. Note the seats for the gunners.

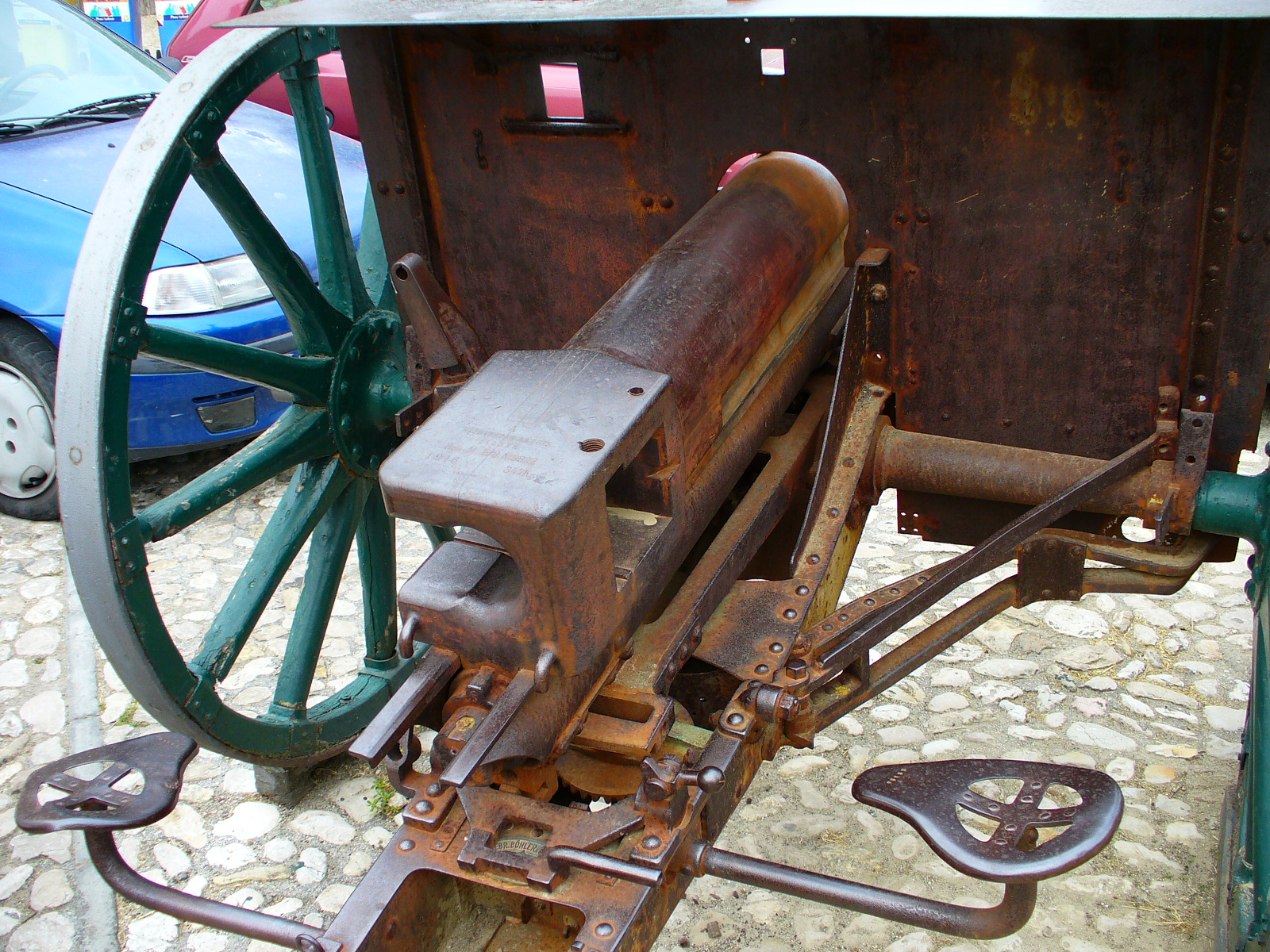
Breech of an 8 cm FK M5 cannon.

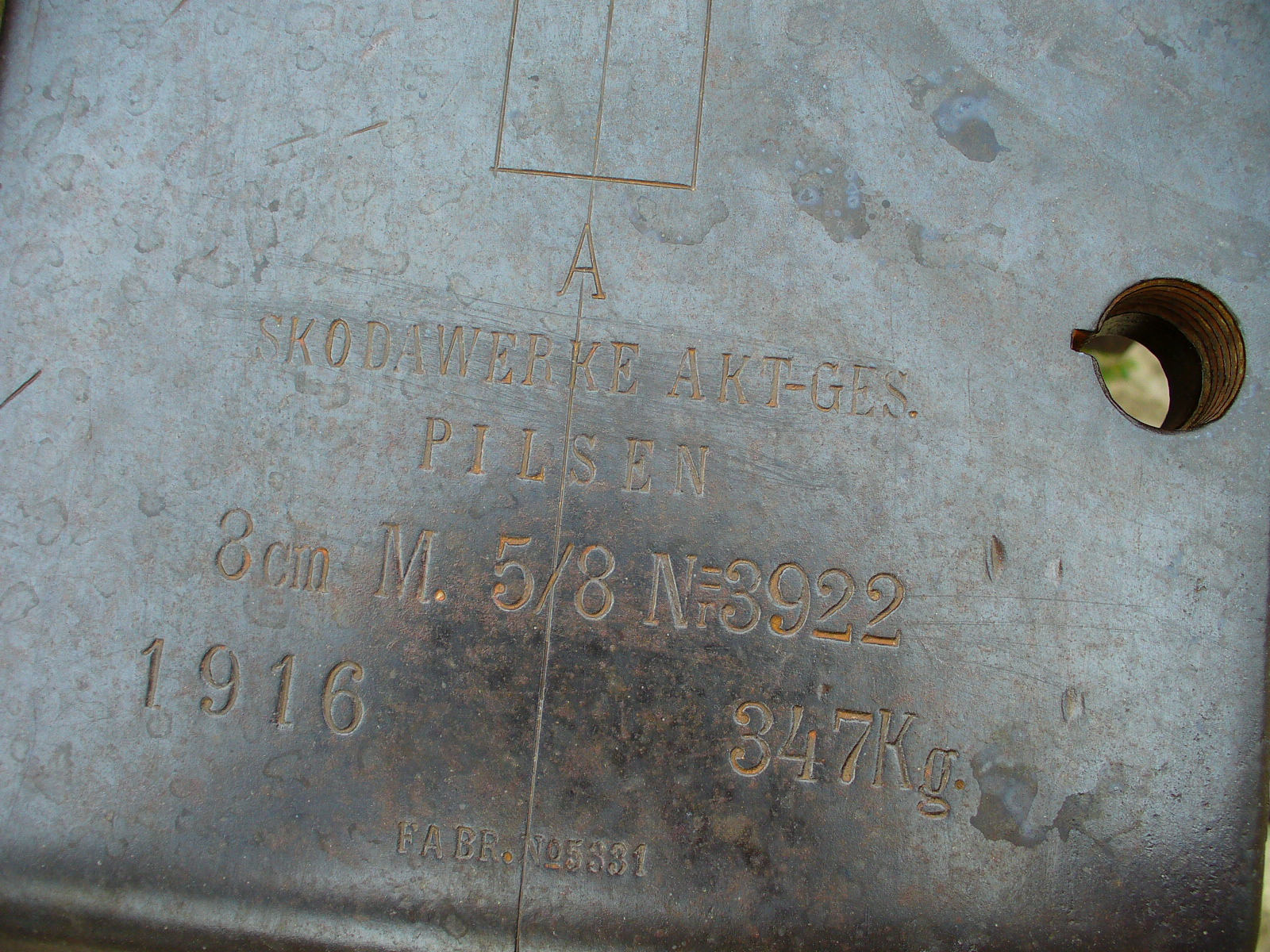
Manufacturers stamp on an 8 cm FK M5 cannon.

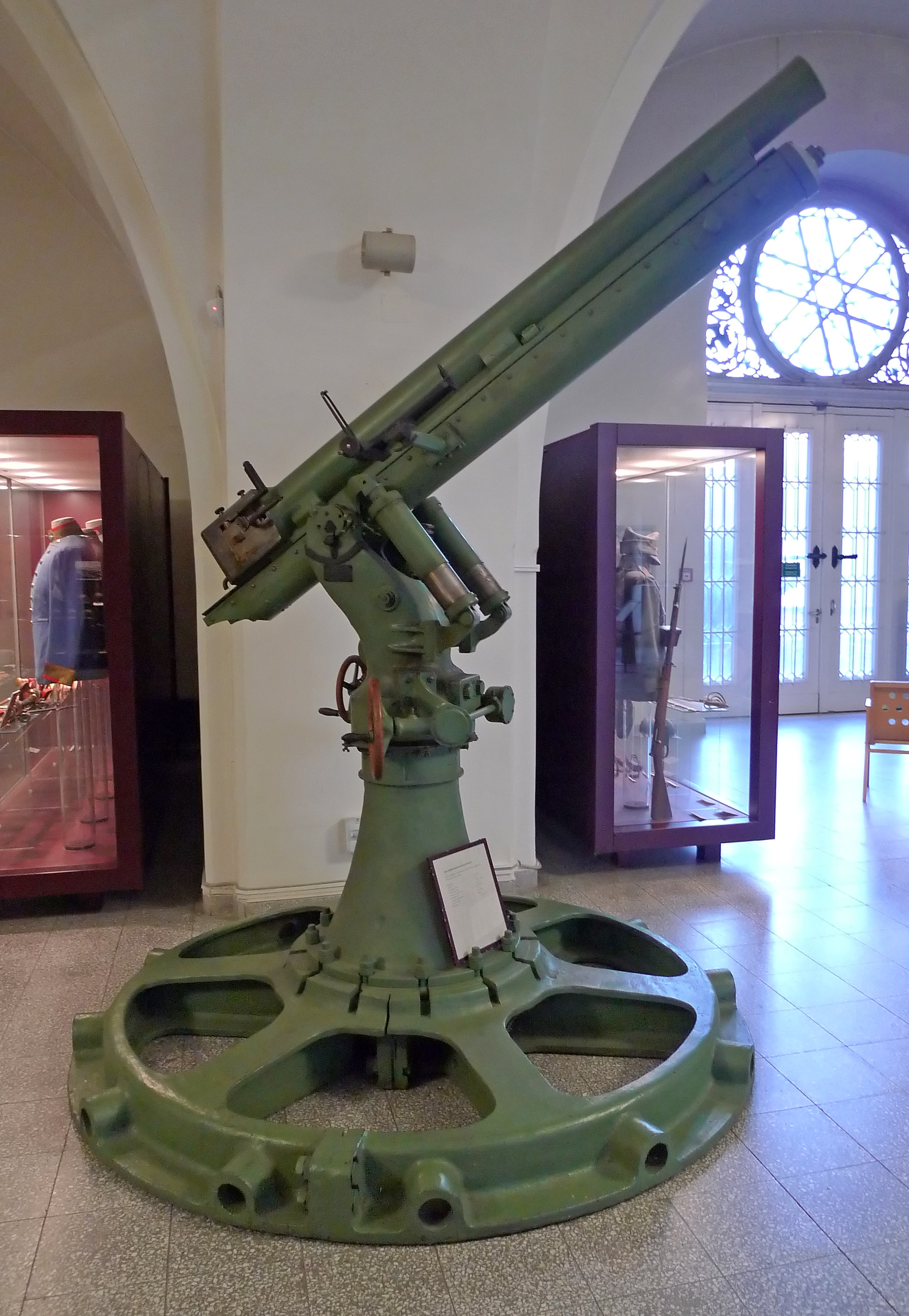
8 cm anti-aircraft cannon M 5/8 MP, Heeresgeschichtliches Museum Wien.

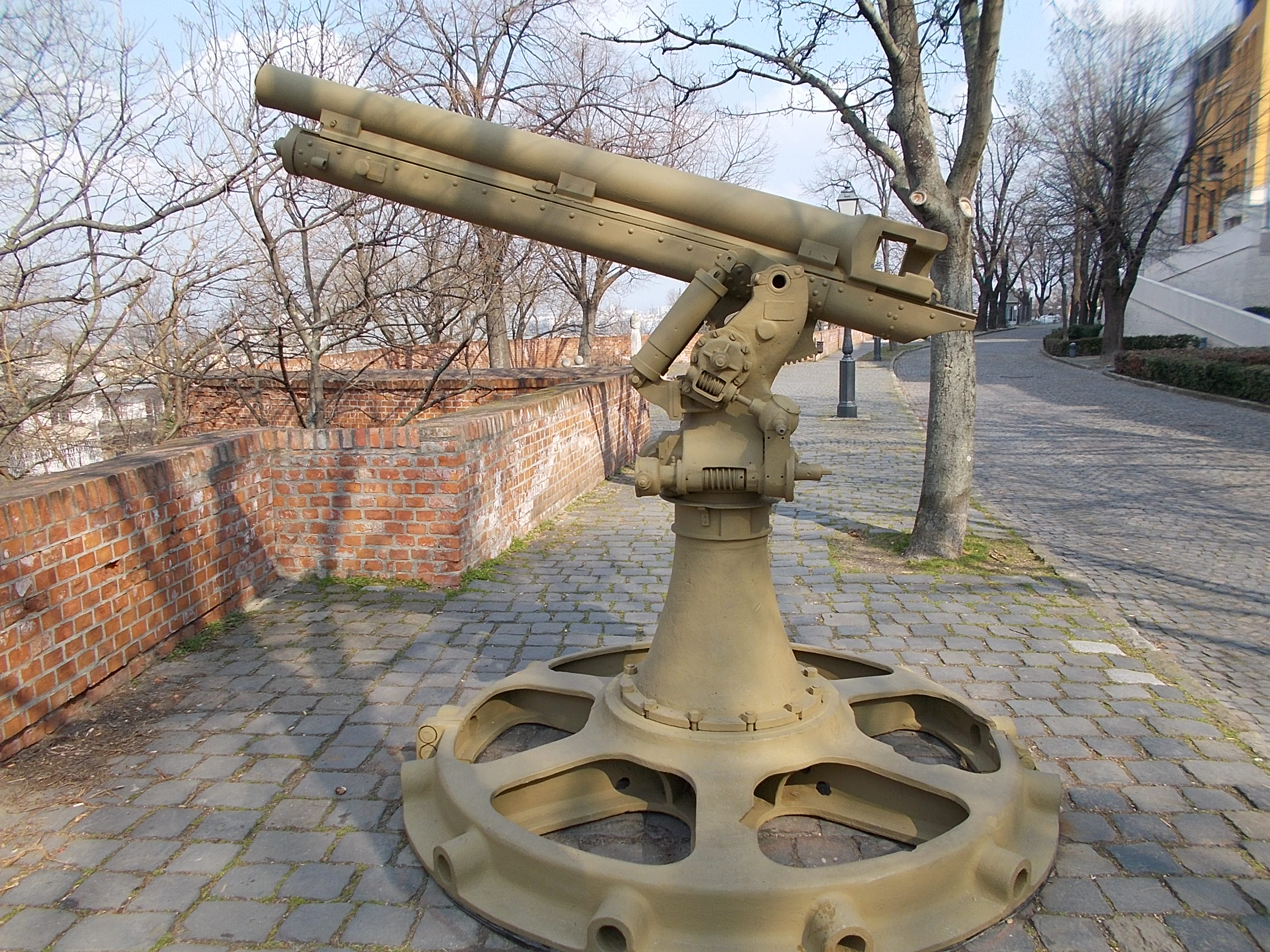
On Anjou Bastion. Buda Castle Quarter, Budapest

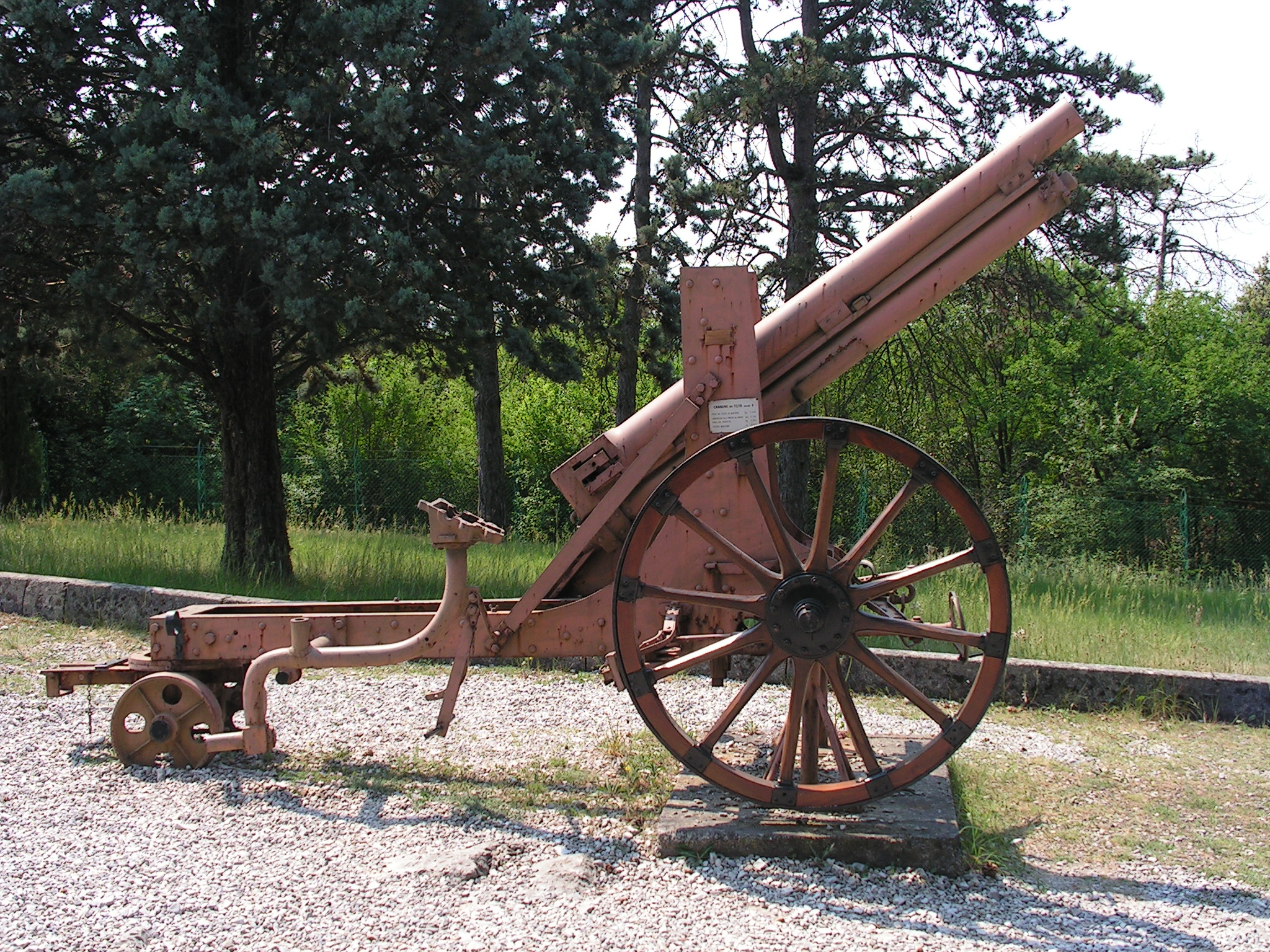
A modified Italian Cannone 77/28 modello 5/8
