= 4.7-inch gun M1906 =

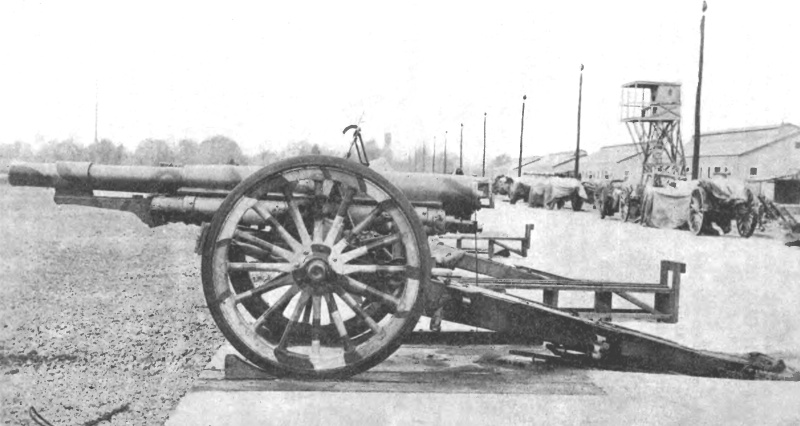
- Type: Field gun
- Place of origin: United States

Service history
- In service: 1911–1932
- Used by: United States Army
- Wars: World War I

Production history
- Designer: United States Army Ordnance Department
- Designed: 1906
- Manufacturer: Gun: Watervliet Arsenal, Northwest Ordnance Co.; Carriage: Rock Island Arsenal, Walter Scott Co., Studebaker Corp.
- Produced: 1907-1919
- No. built: 209 guns, 470 carriages
- Variants: M1906MI

Specifications
- Mass: 7,393 lb (3,353 kg)
- Barrel length: Bore: 129.22 inches (3.282 m) (27.5 calibers); Total: 134.92 inches (3.427 m)
- Shell: fixed, 60 lb (27 kg) or 45 lb (20 kg)
- Calibre: 4.7 in (120 mm)
- Breech: interrupted screw
- Recoil: hydro-spring
- Carriage: box trail
- Elevation: -5° to +15°
- Traverse: 8°
- Muzzle velocity: 1,700 ft/s (520 m/s)
- Maximum firing range: 7,270 yd (6,650 m) (8,700 yd (8,000 m) with 45-lb shell)
- Feed system: hand

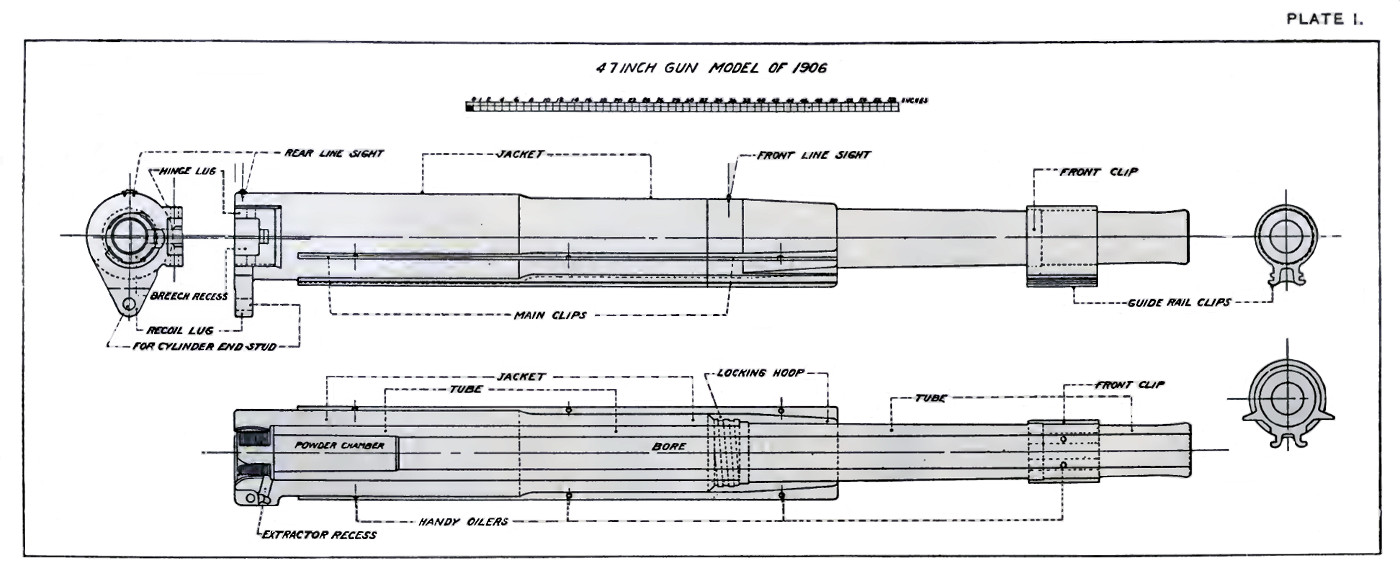
Barrel construction

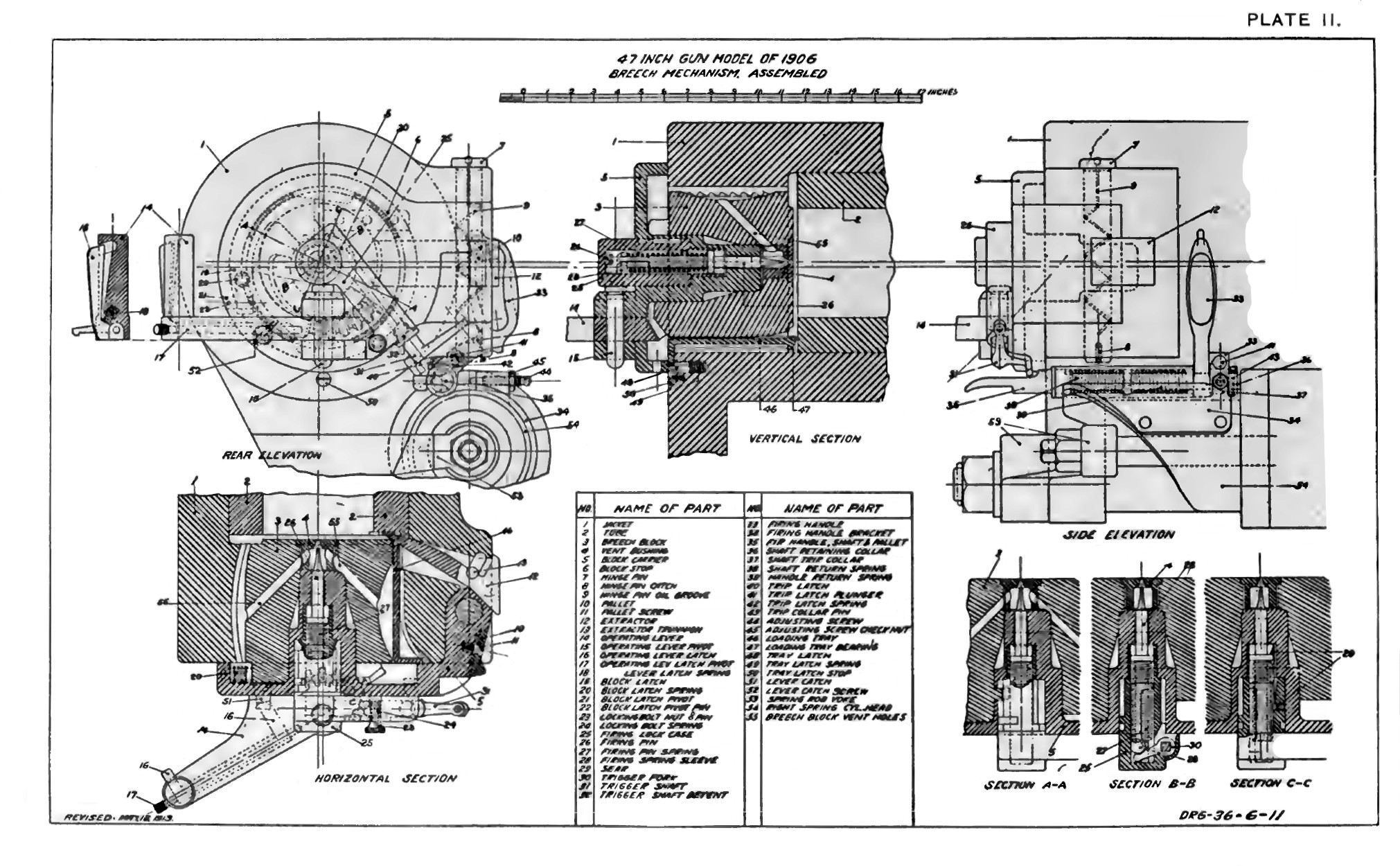
Breech mechanism

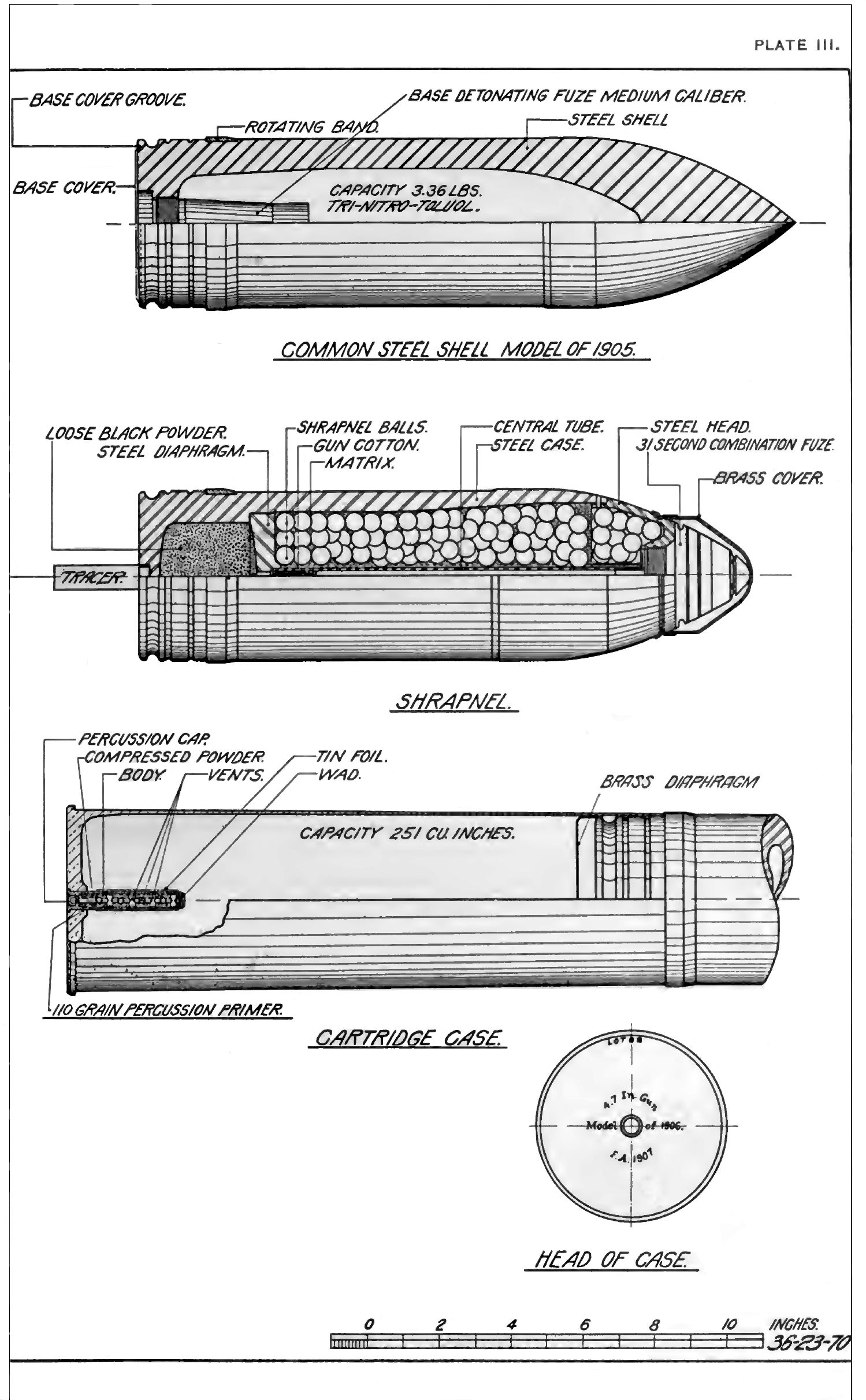
4.7-inch gun ammunition

The 4.7-inch gun M1906 (initially the M1904) was designed and issued by the United States Army Ordnance Department beginning in 1906, with the first units receiving the weapon in 1911. It was of the field gun type. It was one of very few pre-war US artillery designs selected for wartime production in World War I, although (as with most of these projects) few of these weapons were delivered to France and used in action. A combination of a limited pre-war munitions industry, the short (19-month) US participation in the war, technical problems with large-scale production, and the ready availability of munitions overseas led to this.

== History ==
The design was orthodox for its time with a box trail and hydro-spring recoil system. By the time of the American entry into World War I 60 had been produced and issued to the Army. Once the US entered World War I the US Army soon decided to adopt French and British artillery systems, and it was proposed to rechamber the 4.7-inch gun to fire French 120 mm ammunition. However, the presumed effect on production was too great, and this proposal was abandoned. Another source (Hogg) states that changing over to French ammunition (of which France had only limited production in this caliber) snarled production badly in late 1918. With the war over in November of that year, 149 guns and 320 carriages were produced between early 1917 and the Armistice, after which gun production apparently ceased but carriage production continued. By the time production probably ceased on 17 April 1919, of 960 guns and 1,148 carriages ordered from 1906 through early 1917, only about 209 guns and 470 carriages were completed, according to the official history of US World War I war production, America's Munitions 1917–1918. Sixty-four of these weapons (48 from pre-war stocks) were shipped to France to equip three regiments, of which two (the 302nd and 328th Field Artillery) saw action with 48 guns total. The official history does not mention switching the 4.7-inch gun to French ammunition, but does note that 994,852 4.7-inch shells were produced by the US through 1 November 1918; many of these may have been for British consumption. The majority of the weapons were probably used for training in the United States, as shipments from the US to Europe were primarily men and ammunition. Regardless of what type of ammunition it used, the weapon remained in US service, though in reserve storage, until 1932.

Williford states that total orders through early 1917 were 226 at Watervliet Arsenal. In early 1917 additional orders were placed at Watervliet (240 guns), Northwest Ordnance (500 guns), Walter Scott Co. (250 carriages), Studebaker (500 carriages), and Rock Island Arsenal (198 carriages).

The 24 weapons emplaced on fixed pedestal mounts for land defense in the Panama Canal Zone from 1918 to 1926 were the 4.7-inch howitzer M1913, not an M1906 weapon as some sources state.

== Ammunition ==
Ammunition included a base-fuzed common steel shell containing 3.36 pounds (1.52 kg) of TNT, and a shrapnel shell containing 711 230-grain (15 g) balls with a 31-second combination fuze and optional tracer.

== Surviving examples ==
- Fort Sill, Oklahoma
- Black Earth, Wisconsin: Veterans Memorial Park, Park St. & Mills St.
- DeForest, Wisconsin: Veterans Memorial Park North Main Street / County Highway CV, DeForest, Wisconsin.
- Camp Douglas, Wisconsin: Volk Field, Wisc. National Guard Museum
- Institute of Military Technology, Titusville, Florida
- Fort Howard (Maryland): Battery Harris Undergoing restoration, fall 2015.
- Golden, Colorado: near Camp George West, Studebaker carriage No. 661 dated 1918
- South Park (Pittsburgh): Allegheny County Park, Park Entrance on Corrigan Drive
- North Park (Pittsburgh): Allegheny County Park, Pittsburgh, Pennsylvania
- Clarion, Pennsylvania, Veterans Memorial Park
- Fort Collins, Colorado: City Park, Playground Area. No. 340
- Newport News, Virginia: Virginia War Memorial Museum, Huntington Park
- Rogers, Arkansas: Barrel No. 583; undergoing restoration. To be displayed at Veterans Park.
- Muskegon, Michigan: Veterans Memorial Park (M-120 causeway), pair
- Shenandoah, Virginia: Corner of U.S. 340 & Maryland Avenue
- Fork Union, Virginia: Fork Union Military Academy
- Geneva, Illinois: Wheeler Park, pair next to the senior center
- Bolton Landing, New York: Bolton Veterans Memorial, on Lake Shore Drive near Rogers Park
- Cameron, West Virginia: Legion Memorial Park off of Main Street
- Saxton, Pennsylvania: Saxton Community Parkway along 9th and Main Street VFW Post 4129 & American Legion Post 169
- Pine Grove, Pennsylvania: Schuylkill County. Outside American Legion Post 374, 42 S Tulpehocken St
- West Warwick, Rhode Island: two guns on display outside of the VFW Post in Arctic Village.
- Stillwater, Oklahoma: OSU ROTC Campus Off Knoblock and Athletic Blvd
- Sandwich, Illinois: Sandwich VFW Post 1486 and American Legion Post 181 South Main St.
- Morton Grove, Illinois: Studebaker carriage dated 1918. American Legion Civic Center 6140 Dempster St.
- Collinsville, Connecticut: Veterans Memorial on River St.
- Chicago, Illinois: Front yard of a house in the 1500 block of N. Hoyne Street. Misidentified on sign as an M1912 howitzer.
- Watervliet, Michigan: VFW Post 1137 Across the street from the High School and Hospital.
- Muncie, Indiana: Heekin Park
- Norway Michigan: Norway Township cemetery (no 648 Studebaker carriage)
- Wantage Township, New Jersey: Outside American Legion Post 213, restored in August, 2025
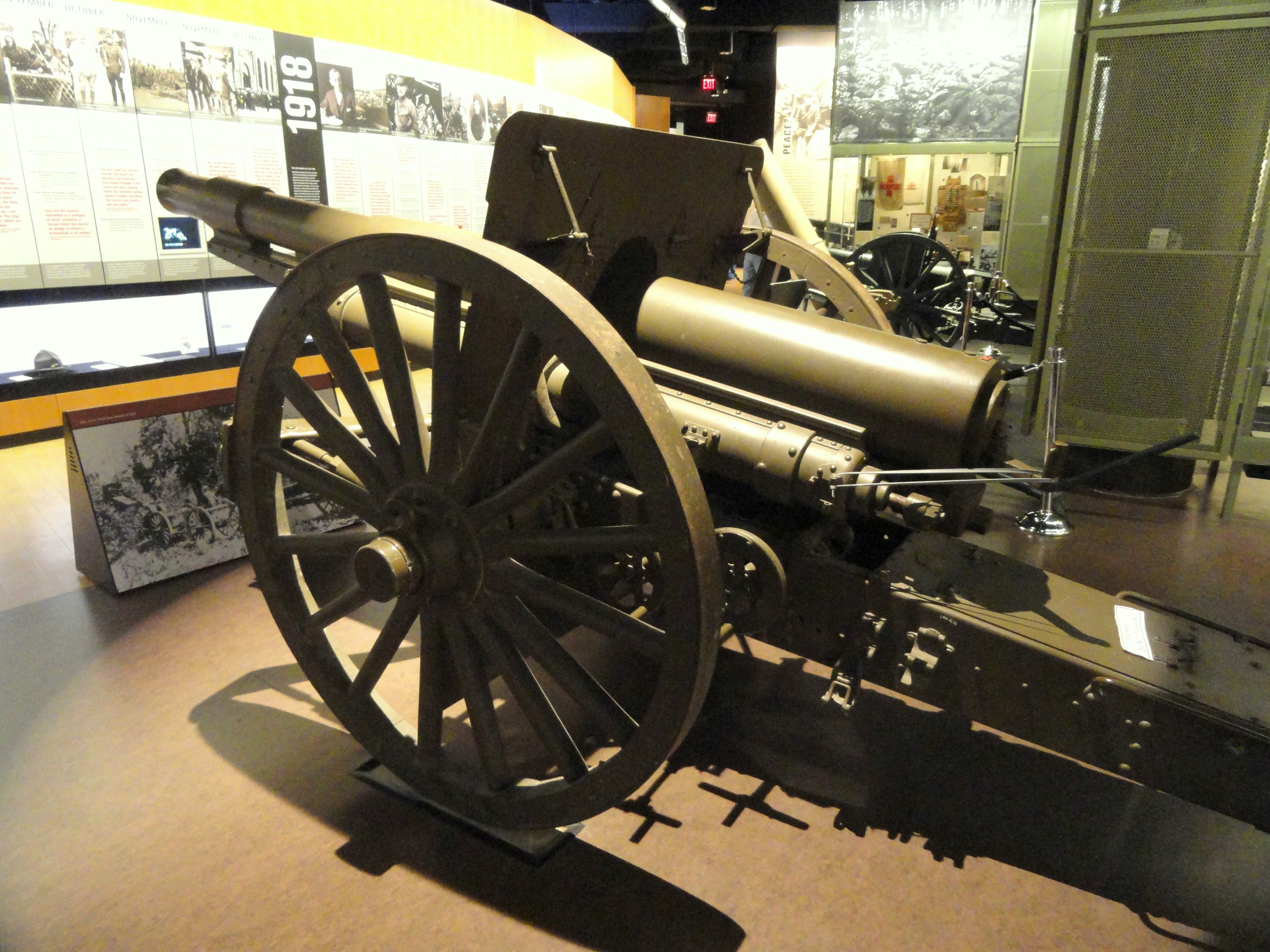
4.7-inch Gun M1906 at the National World War I Museum in Kansas City

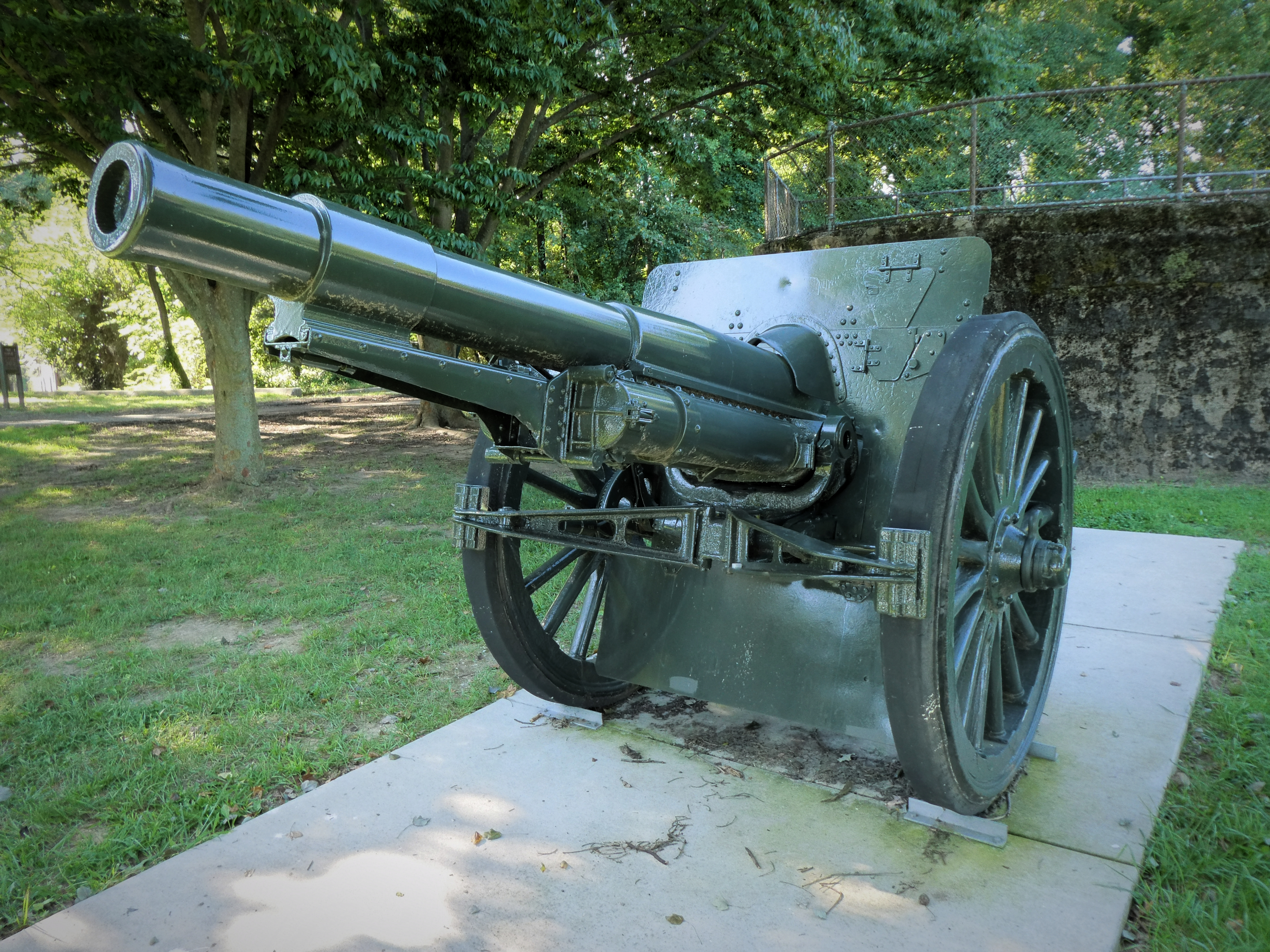
In Baltimore County, Maryland

== See also ==
- List of U.S. Army weapons by supply catalog designation
- United States home front during World War I
- List of field guns

=== Weapons of comparable role, performance and era ===
- QF 4.7-inch Gun Mk I–IV British naval gun of the same calibre, deployed as a field gun
- Obusier de 120 mm mle 15TR A French field howitzer of comparable performance
