= 10.5 cm Kanone C/85 =

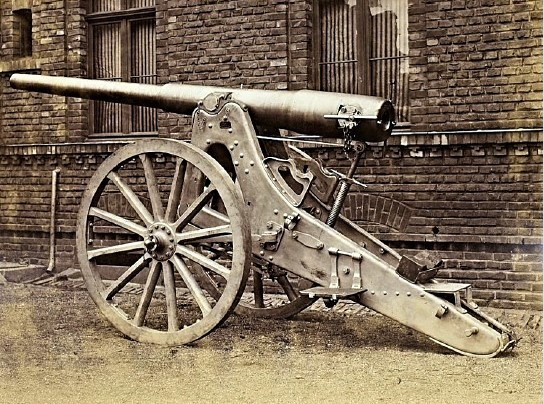
- Type: Fortress gun Siege gun
- Place of origin: German Empire

Service history
- In service: 1885-1918
- Used by: Kingdom of Romania; Kingdom of Bulgaria
- Wars: Balkan Wars; World War I

Production history
- Designer: Krupp
- Designed: 1885
- Manufacturer: Krupp
- No. built: 60

Specifications
- Mass: Travel: 3,400 kg (7,500 lb); Combat: 2,600 kg (5,700 lb)
- Barrel length: 3.68 m (12 ft 1 in) L/35
- Height: 2.2 m (7 ft 3 in)
- Shell: Separate-loading, bagged charges and projectiles
- Shell weight: 16 kg (35 lb 4 oz); HE, Shrapnel
- Caliber: 105 mm (4.1 in)
- Breech: Horizontal sliding-block
- Carriage: Box trail
- Elevation: -5° to +35°
- Traverse: 4°
- Rate of fire: 2 rpm
- Muzzle velocity: 480–610 m/s (1,600–2,000 ft/s)
- Maximum firing range: 9.5–11 km (5.9–6.8 mi)

The 10.5 cm Festungs und Belagerungs Kanone C/85 was a fortress and siege gun produced in Germany and used by Romania during the Second Balkan War and World War I.

== Design ==
The C/85 was fairly conventional for its time and most nations had similar guns such as its Russian cousin the 42-line fortress and siege gun Pattern of 1877 or its French rival the Canon de 120 mm modèle 1878. The C/85 used a predecessor of Krupp's sliding-block breech known as a cylindro-prismatic breech and the gun used separate-loading, bagged charges, and projectiles. Like many of its contemporaries, the C/85 had a box trail carriage, no gun shield, two wooden-spoked steel-rimmed wheels, an unsprung axle, and no recoil mechanism. The carriages were tall because the guns were designed to sit behind a parapet with the barrel overhanging the front in the fortress artillery role or behind a trench or berm in the siege role. In these roles, it provided long-range, low-angle, counter-battery fire against enemy artillery.

An early drawback of the gun was that it required considerable time to prepare a firing platform made of concrete or timbers before use. An external recoil cylinder was then bolted to the platform and connected to an eyelet on the bottom of the gun carriage. Without it, the gun had no recoil mechanism and when fired the gun rolled back onto a set of ramps behind the wheels and then slid back into position. Since it lacked a recoil mechanism it had to be levered into position and re-aimed after every shot, which was strenuous, time-consuming, and limited its rate of fire. The height of the gun also limited the rate of fire since a gun crew needed to lift a 16 kg (35 lb 4 oz) projectile to shoulder height.

An early modification to make the guns suitable for field use was the fitting of Bonagente grousers to the wheels to improve balance and reduce ground pressure on soft ground. A bonus was they slowed recoil and didn't require extensive site preparation to bring the guns into action. For transport, the gun was attached to a limber for towing by a horse team or artillery tractor.

== Romanian Use ==
In 1891 the Romanians ordered 60 C/85 guns and in Romanian service, they were given the designation Tunul Krupp, calibrul 105 mm, model 1891, and were used during the Second Balkan War. In 1916 they were deployed at Tutrakan and Cernavoda, equipping two heavy artillery regiments: the 2nd regiment had 24 guns, and the 3rd regiment had 36 guns. By the beginning of 1918, only 24 remained in service.

== Bulgarian Use ==
After the Romanian campaign, Bulgaria used 31 guns captured from the Romanians for the remainder of World War I under the Bulgarian designation 105-мм нескорострелно оръдие Д-35.

== Surviving examples ==
- One gun at the National Military Museum, Romania, Bucharest
- Two guns at the monument of the heroes in Drobeta Turnu Severin, Mehedinți, Romania
- Two guns at the Military Museum in Sofia, Bulgaria

== Photo Gallery ==
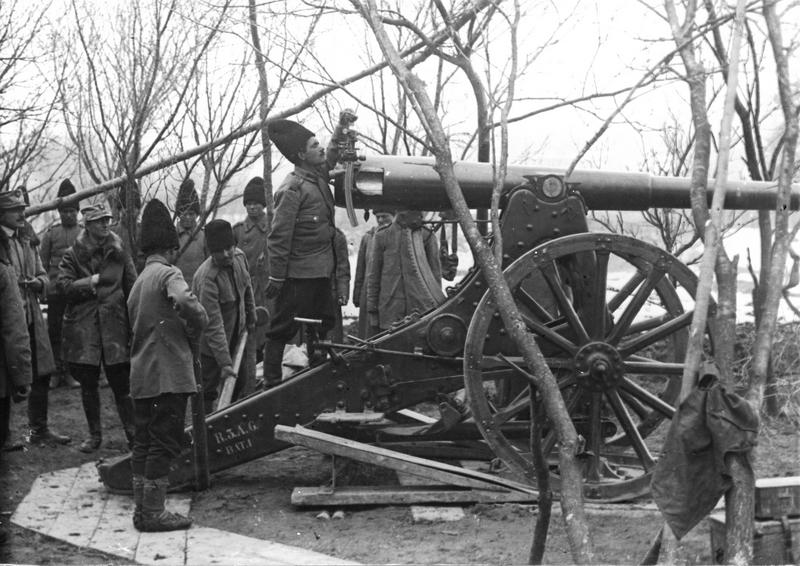
Romanian troops firing a 10.5 cm Kanone C/85.

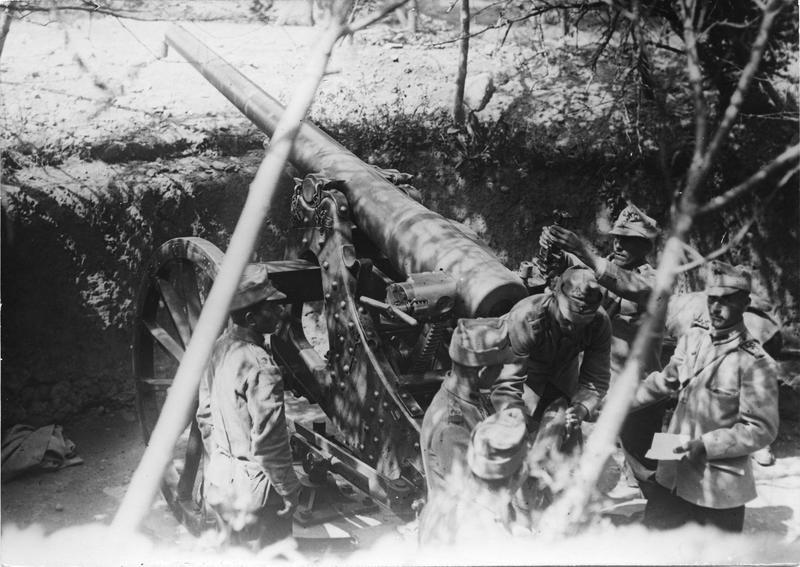

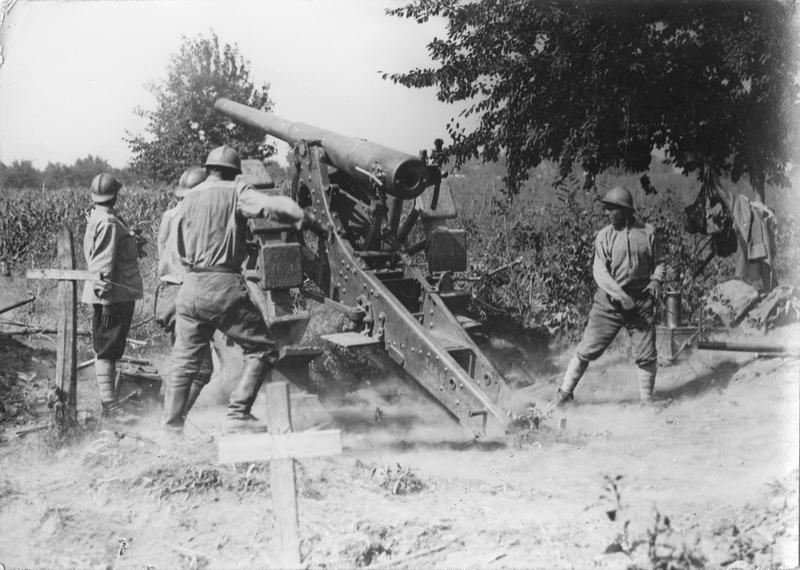
A Romanian gun with Bonagente grousers.

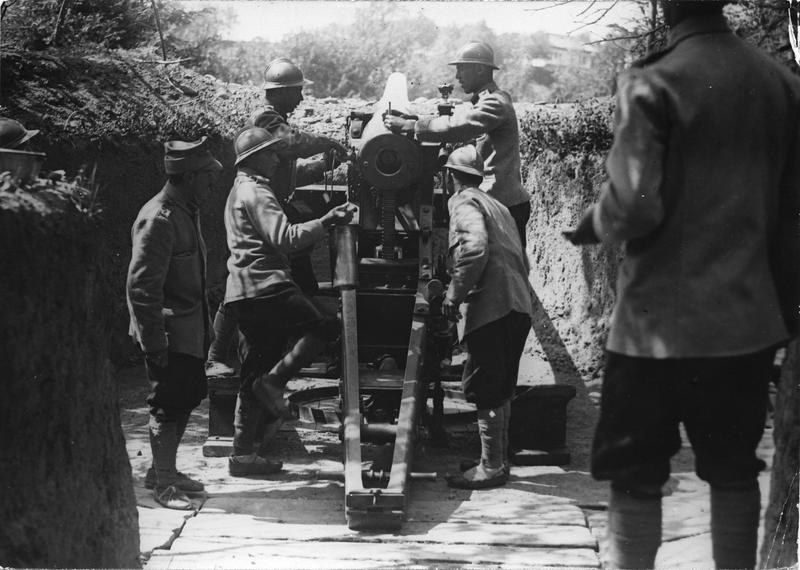

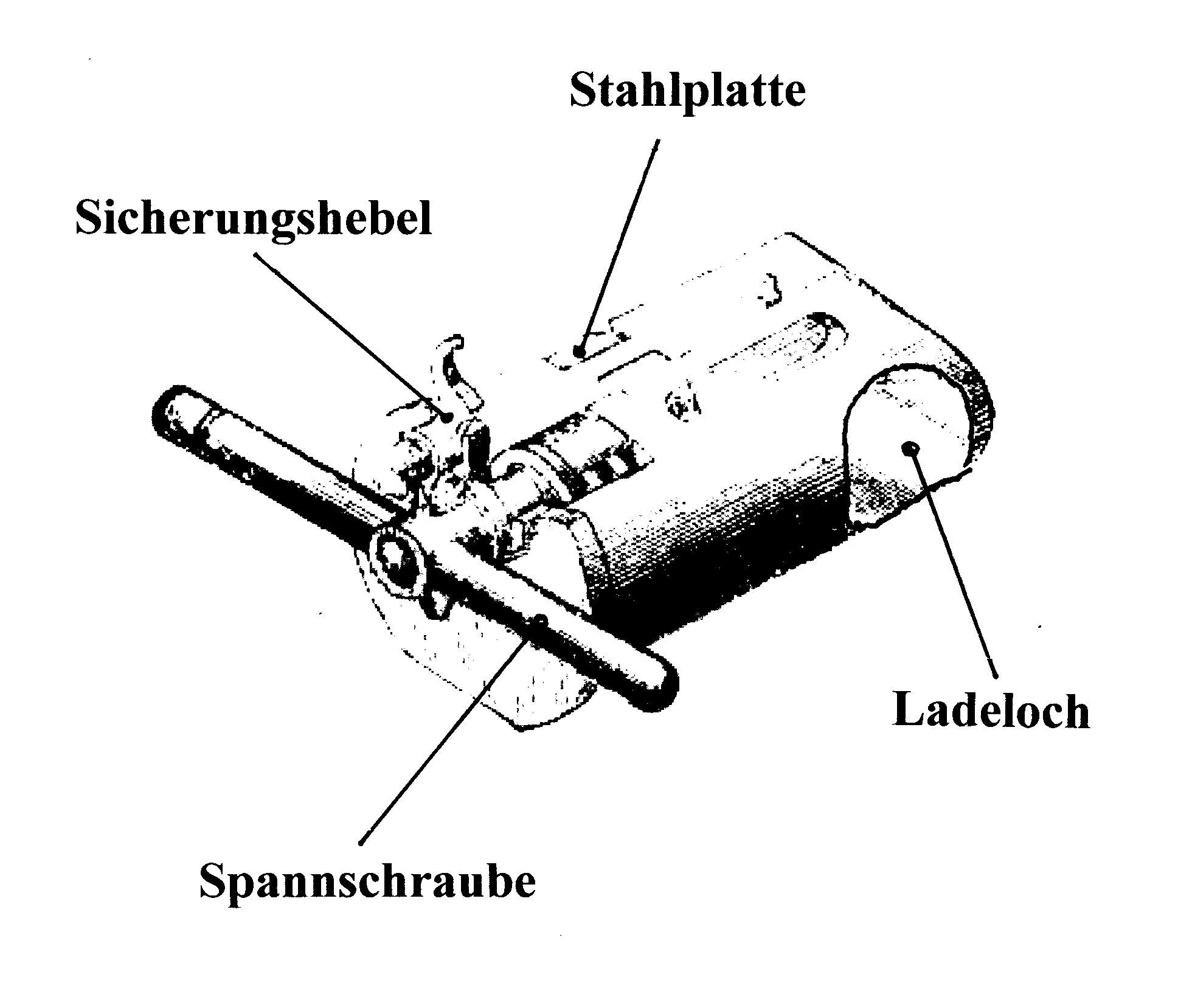
The breech block of the C/85.
