= 9 cm Feldkanone M 75/96 =

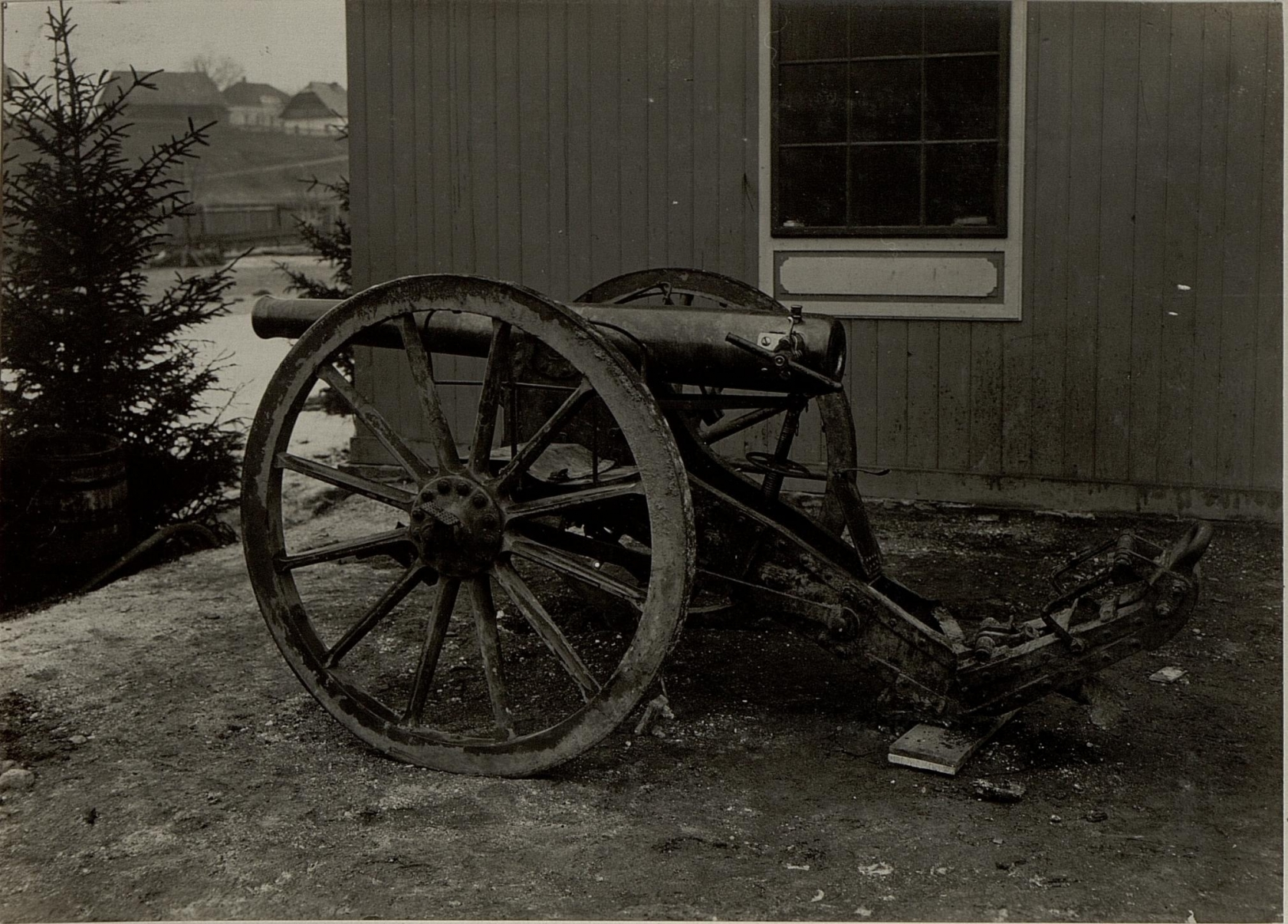
- Type: Field gun
- Place of origin: Austria-Hungary

Service history
- In service: 1898–1918
- Used by: Austria-Hungary
- Wars: World War I

Production history
- Designed: 1895–1898

Specifications
- Mass: 1,084 kg (2,390 lb)
- Barrel length: 2.06 metres (6 ft 9 in)
- Caliber: 87 millimetres (3.4 in)
- Breech: flat wedge with Broadwell obduration
- Rate of fire: 6 rpm
- Muzzle velocity: 440 m/s (1,400 ft/s)
- Effective firing range: 5,000 m (5,500 yd) (shrapnel)
- Maximum firing range: 6,000 m (6,600 yd) (HE)

The 9 cm Feldkanone M 75/96 was a field gun used by Austria-Hungary during World War I, a modernized version of the M 75 field gun. Virtually all the M 75s were upgraded during 1898. For cost reasons the new gun retained the bronze barrel of the original, although it was actually redesigned to withstand the more powerful propellants coming into use. A touch hole lock was added to prevent accidental misfiring when the breech was open. A spring-mounted spade brake reduced recoil from 5–6 metres to 80 centimetres, although it only worked if the spade was buried in the ground. A depression lever was added to elevate the carriage's trail to allow the gun greater depression in mountainous areas. Many guns had shields added after the outbreak of World War I.

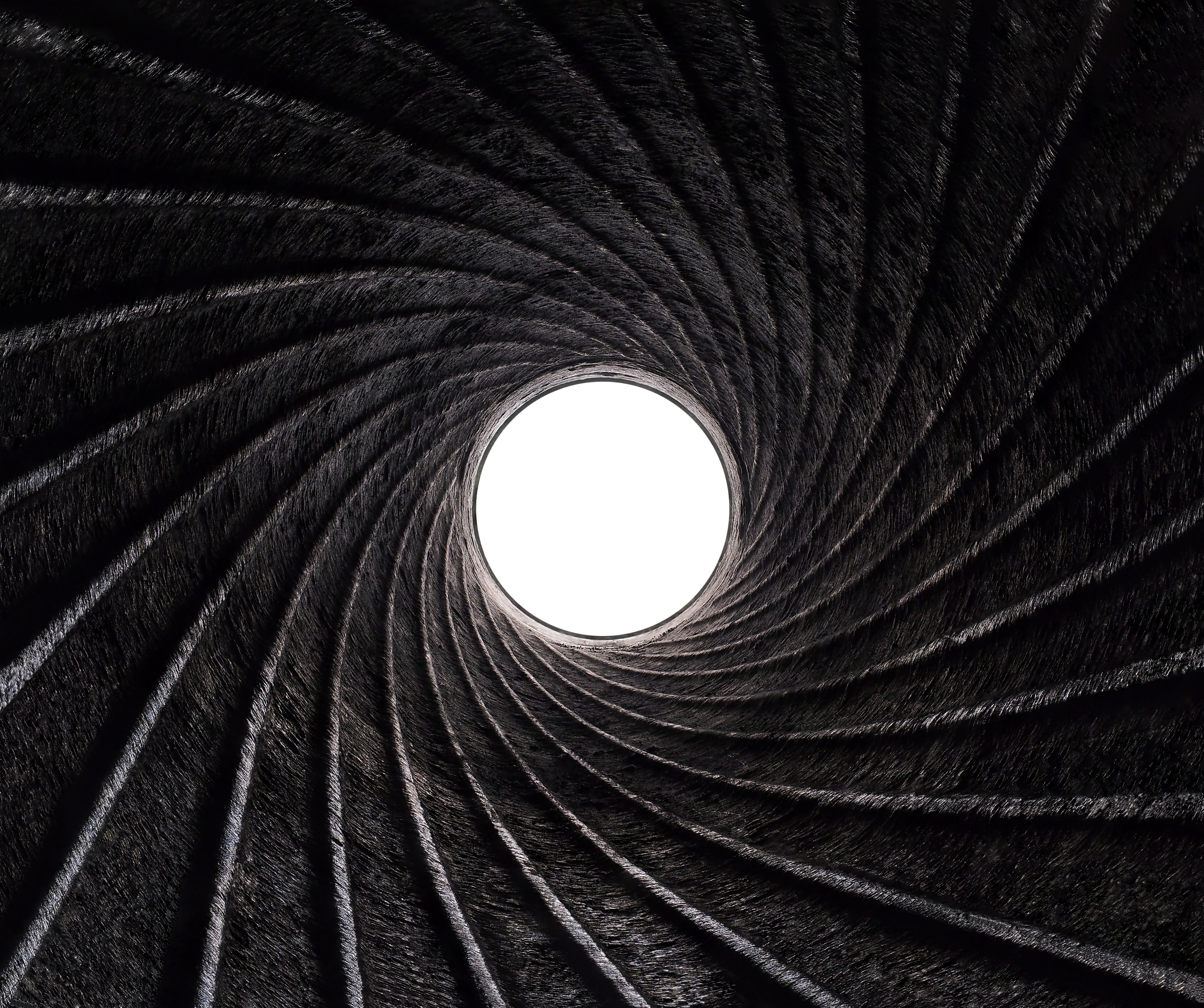
Rifling in the barrel of an example at Ljubljana Castle

== Bibliography ==
- Ortner, M. Christian. The Austro-Hungarian Artillery From 1867 to 1918: Technology, Organization, and Tactics. Vienna, Verlag Militaria, 2007 ISBN 978-3-902526-13-7
- Łukasz Chrzanowski. "Artyleria Austro-Węgierska 1860-1890" Przemyśl, Wydawnictwo FORT, 2008, ISBN 978-83-923657-7-8
