= Field gun =

Class of artillery gun

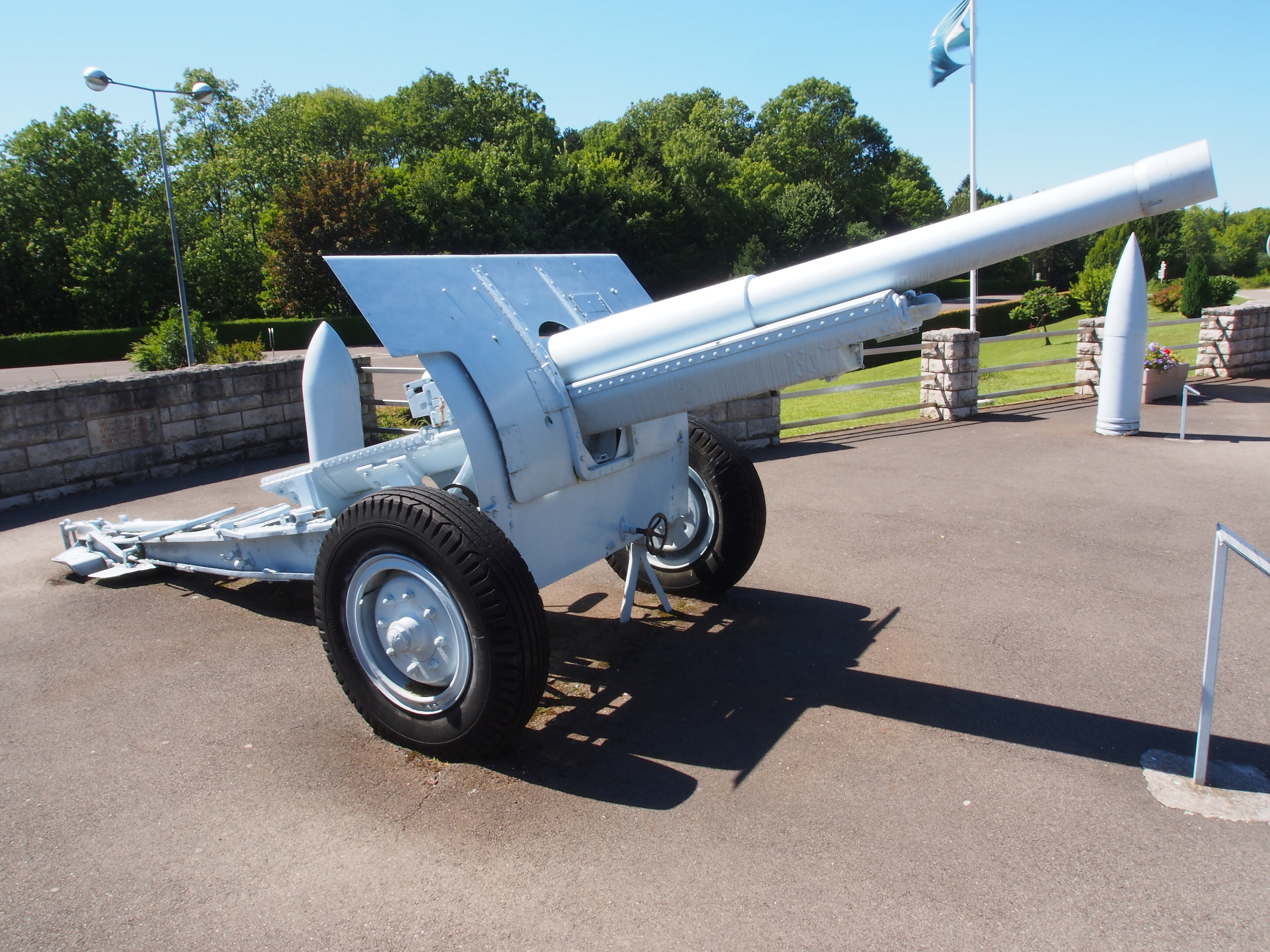
A post-WWI French 105 mm field gun

A field gun is a field artillery piece. Originally the term referred to smaller guns that could accompany a field army on the march, that when in combat could be moved about the battlefield in response to changing circumstances (field artillery), as opposed to guns installed in a fort (garrison artillery or coastal artillery), or to siege cannons and mortars which are too large to be moved quickly, and would be used only in a prolonged siege.

Perhaps the most famous use of the field gun in advanced tactics was Napoleon Bonaparte's use of very large wheels on the guns, which allowed them to be moved quickly even during battle. By moving the guns from point to point during a battle, enemy formations could be broken up to be handled by the infantry or cavalry wherever they were massing, dramatically increasing the overall effectiveness of the attack.

== World War I ==
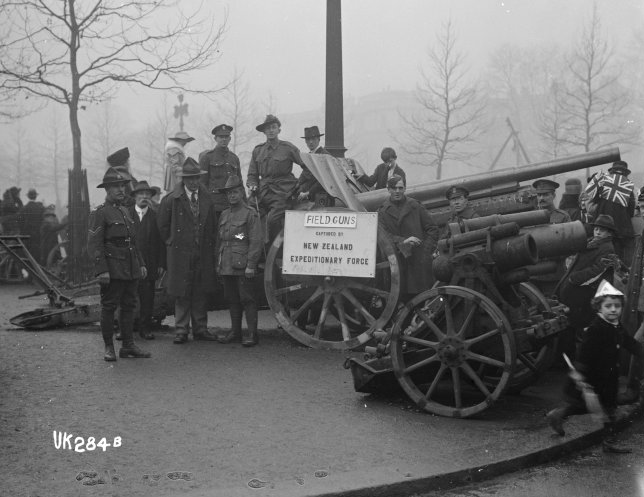
German field guns captured by the NZEF displayed in London, 1918

As the evolution of artillery continued, almost all guns of any size became capable of being moved at some speed. With few exceptions, even the largest siege weapons had become mobile by road or rail by the start of World War I, and evolution after that point tended towards smaller, more mobile weapons. Even the German super-heavy guns in World War II were mobile on rails or caterpillar tracks.

In British use, field guns or light guns were anything up to 4.5 in (110 mm) in calibre, larger calibres were medium guns, and the largest calibres were heavy guns.

== World War II ==
Since the start of World War II, the term has been applied to long-range artillery pieces that fire at relatively low angles, as opposed to howitzers, which can fire at higher angles. Field guns also lack a specialized purpose, such as anti-tank or coastal artillery. By the later stages of World War II, the majority of artillery in use was either in the form of howitzers of 105 mm (4.1 in) to 155 mm (6.1 in), or in the form of hybrid anti-tank/field guns that had high enough muzzle velocity to be used in both roles. The most common field guns of the era were the British 5.5 in (140 mm), the American 155 mm Long Tom (a development of a French World War I weapon) and the Soviet BS-3 – an artillery piece adapted from a naval gun and designed to double up as an anti-tank weapon.

One of the most produced field guns during the war was the Soviet 76 mm (3.0 in) ZiS-3 with over 103,000 produced. The ZiS-3 could be used in direct fire against armored vehicles, direct fire in infantry support, and indirect fire against distant targets.

== 1960s and 1970s ==
The U.S. Army tried the long-range gun again from the early 1960s to the late 1970s with the M107 175 mm gun. The M107 was used extensively in the Vietnam War and proved effective in artillery duels with the North Vietnamese forces. It was considered a high-maintenance item and was removed from service with U.S. forces after a rash of cracked barrels. Production of the M107 continued until 1980, and the gun is still in service with the Israeli military. Reserve stocks are held by other former users, such as the People's Army of Vietnam.

== Modern times ==
Since the 1980s and 1990s, the field gun has seen limited combat use. The class of small and highly mobile artillery has been filled with increasing capacity by the man-portable mortar in 60 mm (2.4 in) or 81 mm (3.2 in)/82 mm (3.2 in) calibre and has replaced every artillery piece smaller than 100 mm (3.9 in). Gun-howitzers fill the middle ground, with the world rapidly standardizing on either the 155 mm (6.1 in) NATO or 152 mm (6.0 in) Warsaw Pact (former USSR) standards. The need for a long-range weapon is filled by rockets, missiles, and aircraft. Modern gun-artillery, such as the L118 105 mm light gun or the M119 105 mm howitzer, is used to provide fire support for infantry and armour at ranges where mortars are impractical. Man-packed mortars lack the range or hitting power of gun-artillery. In between is the rifled towed mortar; this weapon (usually in 120 mm (4.7 in) calibre) is light enough to be towed by a truck or SUV, has a range of over 7.5 km (4.7 mi) and fires a projectile comparable in destructive power to a 152 mm (6.0 in)/155 mm (6.1 in) artillery shell.

== See also ==
- List of field guns
