= 7.7 cm Leichte Kraftwagengeschütze M1914 =

German anti-aircraft gun

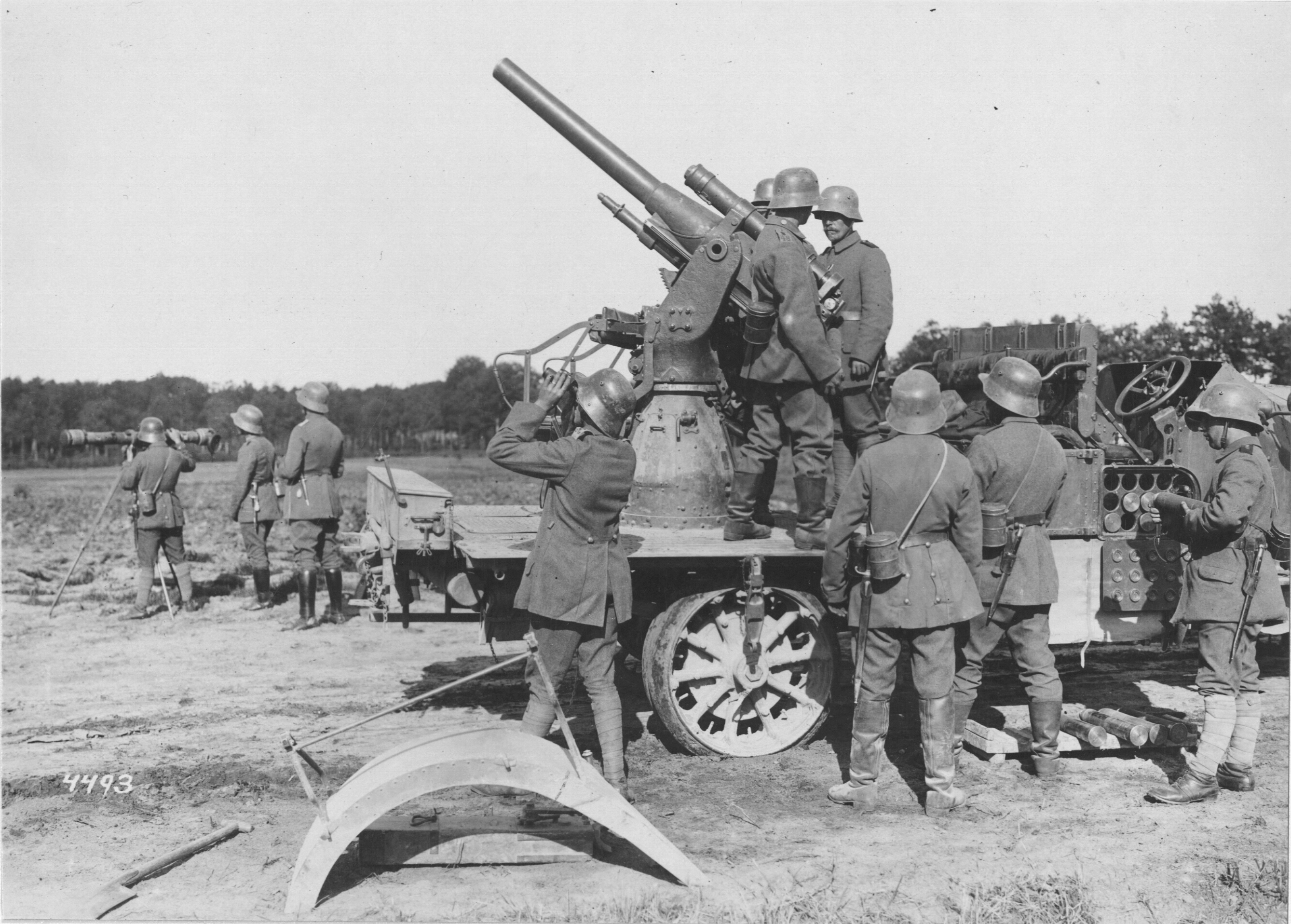
- A German 7.7 cm M1914 in action in Flanders.
- Type: Anti-aircraft gun
- Place of origin: German Empire

Service history
- Used by: German Empire
- Wars: World War I

Production history
- Designer: Krupp
- Designed: 1914
- Manufacturer: Krupp; Rheinmetall
- Produced: 1914
- No. built: 156

Specifications
- Mass: Complete: 7,030 kg (15,500 lb); Gun: 1,082 kg (2,385 lb)
- Barrel length: 2 m (6 ft 7 in) L/27
- Crew: 4
- Shell: 77 x 234 mm R Separate loading, cased charge and projectile
- Shell weight: 6.85 kg (15 lb)
- Caliber: 77 mm (3 in)
- Breech: Semi-automatic horizontal sliding-block
- Recoil: Hydro-pneumatic
- Carriage: 4 x 4 all-wheel drive truck chassis
- Elevation: -5° to +70°
- Traverse: 360°
- Rate of fire: 20-25 rpm
- Muzzle velocity: 465 m/s (1,530 ft/s)
- Effective firing range: Horizontal: 7.8 km (5 mi)
- Maximum firing range: Vertical: 4,250 m (13,940 ft)
- Armor: 3-5 mm
- Secondary armament: None
- Engine: 90 hp liquid cooled gasoline
- Maximum speed: Road: 50–60 km/h (31–37 mph); Offroad: 30 km/h (19 mph)

The 7.7 cm Leichte Kraftwagengeschütze M1914 was an early German self-propelled anti-aircraft gun developed before and used during the First World War. Static and trailer mounted versions of the gun were designated 7.7 cm FlaK L/27.

== History ==
During the Franco-Prussian War, Paris was surrounded by the Prussians, and the French attempted to use balloons to smuggle messages and supplies in and out of the besieged city. In response, Krupp developed a 37 mm cannon mounted on a pedestal and sat on a four-wheeled horse cart. The cannon was designated BallonabwehrKanone, or BaK, and was the first practical anti-aircraft gun. Although armed aircraft were used as early as the Italo-Turkish and Balkan Wars, the designation BallonabwehrKanone remained in use until it was replaced by the more familiar FlugabwehrKanone or FlaK later in the First World War.

Designs for dedicated anti-aircraft guns existed before the First World War, but only a few were in service. The idea of a truck-mounted self-propelled anti-aircraft gun had also existed since 1906 but only few had been built. In 1912, both Krupp and Rheinmetall were asked to prepare prototypes of a self-propelled anti-aircraft gun. The design that was tested and approved for production in 1913 was from Krupp and would later be known as the 7.7 cm Leichtes Kraftwagengeschütz M1914. The gun, mounts, and vehicle layout remained similar despite being produced by both Krupp and Rheinmetall. The primary role for the M1914 was to provide mobile air defenses for targets such as supply depots, command centers and bridges. In addition to their anti-aircraft role, M1914's were often used as anti-tank guns during the final year of the war since they were able to move from place to place quickly to repulse allied armored thrusts.

== Production priorities ==
A number of factors forced the Germans to prioritize the production of field artillery over the production of specialized anti-aircraft guns.

These factors included:

- A lack of raw materials
- An underestimation of light field artillery losses during the first two years of war and an inadequate number of replacement guns being produced
- An underestimation of ammunition consumption, inadequate production capacity, and resulting shortages
- The need for new field guns with superior performance
- An underestimation of the threat posed by ground-attack aircraft
- A surplus of obsolete and captured field guns

This meant that obsolete light field guns such as the 9 cm Kanone C/73 and captured guns such as the 76 mm divisional gun M1902 and Canon de 75 modèle 1897 were often issued to anti-aircraft units where they were used as makeshift anti-aircraft guns. Most were either propped up on earthen embankments or scaffolds to point the muzzle skyward. However, their limited traverse and elevation hindered their use as anti-aircraft guns. Instead of producing new guns like the M1914, the Germans often opted to convert a large number of captured M1902s and M1897s and had to create the 7.62 cm FlaK L/30 and 7.7 cm FlaK L/35 by placing the existing barrels on new or modified carriages. It was for these reasons that only a total of 156 were produced.

== Design ==
The barrel for the 7.7 cm FlaK L/27 was built from steel and was 27 calibers in length. The trunnioned barrel was held by a U-shaped gun cradle that rotated on top of a steel pedestal. At the front of the pedestal, there was also a seat for two crew members while on the move. The gun had a semi-automatic Krupp horizontal sliding-wedge breech to boost its rate of fire and used the same ammunition as the FK 96 n.A. There was a hydro-pneumatic recoil system located above and below the barrel, along with an equilibrator to balance the gun. The gun was capable of 360° of traverse and -5° to +70° of elevation.

The pedestal mount was bolted to a lightly armored 4 x 4 (all-wheel drive) truck chassis. The vehicle was powered by a 90 hp liquid-cooled gasoline engine. Along the sides of the vehicle were lockers for ready ammunition, as well as supplies for the gun crew. The sides of the vehicle were unfolded to provide a firing platform. There were also seats for the gun crew. A number of different truck chassis were used such as Krupp-Daimler and Ehrhardt-Rheinmetall.

== Guns of comparable role, era, and performance ==
- 75/27 C.K. - was an Italian self-propelled anti-aircraft gun that was actually a copy of the 7 .7 cm Leichte Kraftwagengeschütze M1914. In 1913, Italy bought a few M1914's for evaluation and decided to build their own version using a converted barrel from their Cannone da 75/27 modello 06 field-gun, which was itself a Krupp design produced under license and mounted on the back of either an Itala X and Fiat 18BL truck chassis.
- Autocanon de 75mm mle 1913 - a French self-propelled anti-aircraft version of the mle 1897 on the back of a De Dion-Bouton truck chassis.
- QF 13-pounder 9 cwt - a British anti-aircraft gun often mounted on the back of a Thornycroft or Peerless truck chassis.
- 76 mm air-defense gun M1914/15 - a Russian anti-aircraft gun sometimes mounted on the back of a Russo-Balt type T truck chassis.

== Photo gallery ==
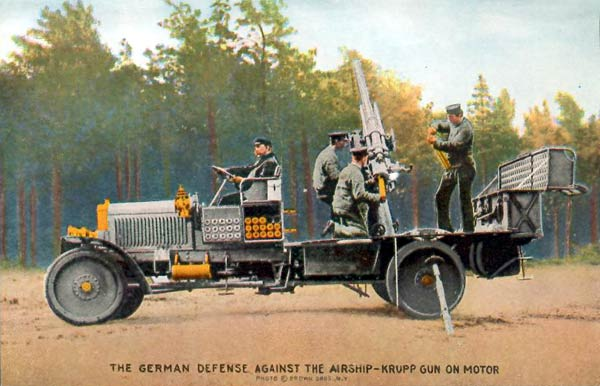
A postcard of a Krupp-Daimler M1914

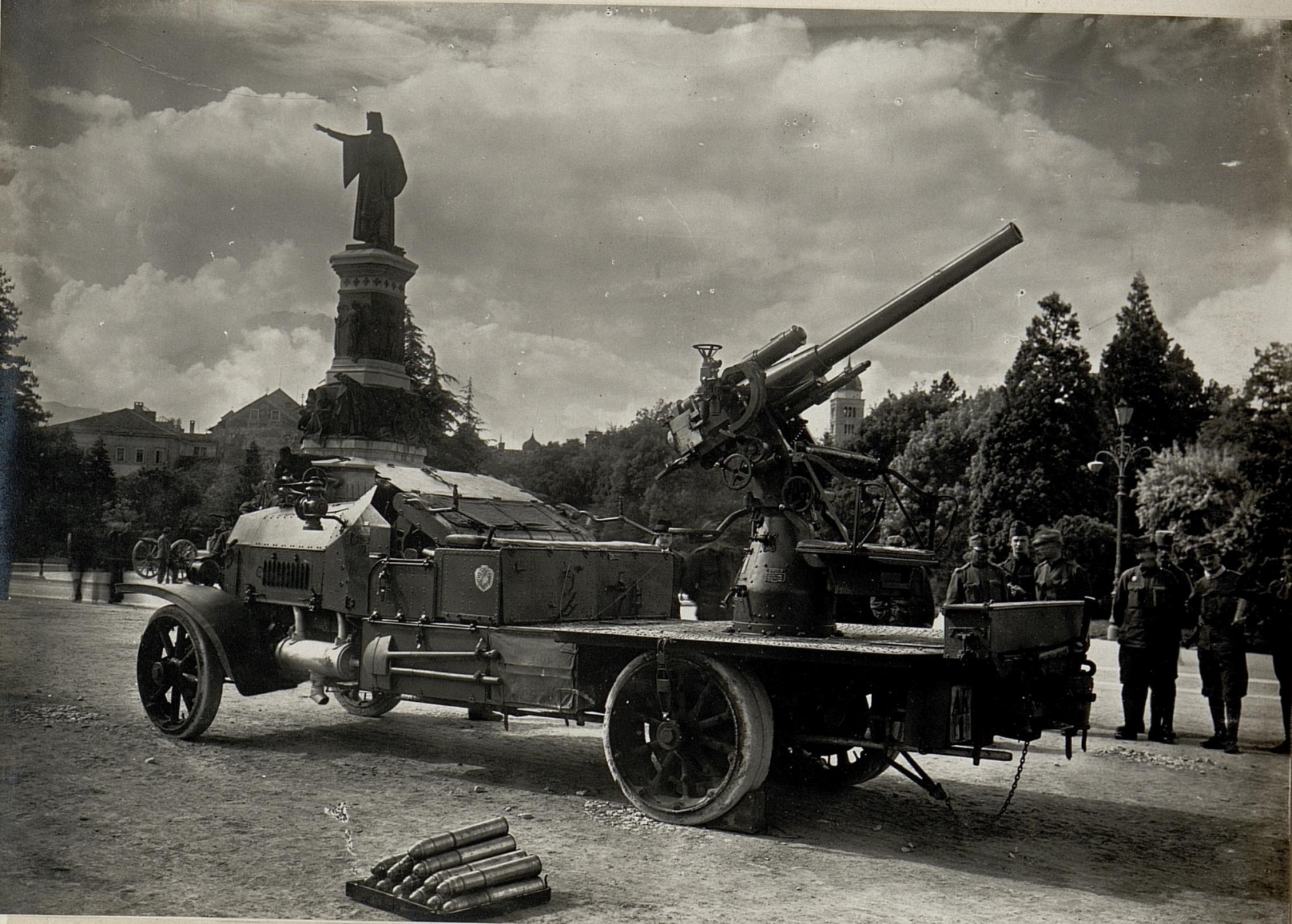
An Ehrhardt-Rheinmetall M1914

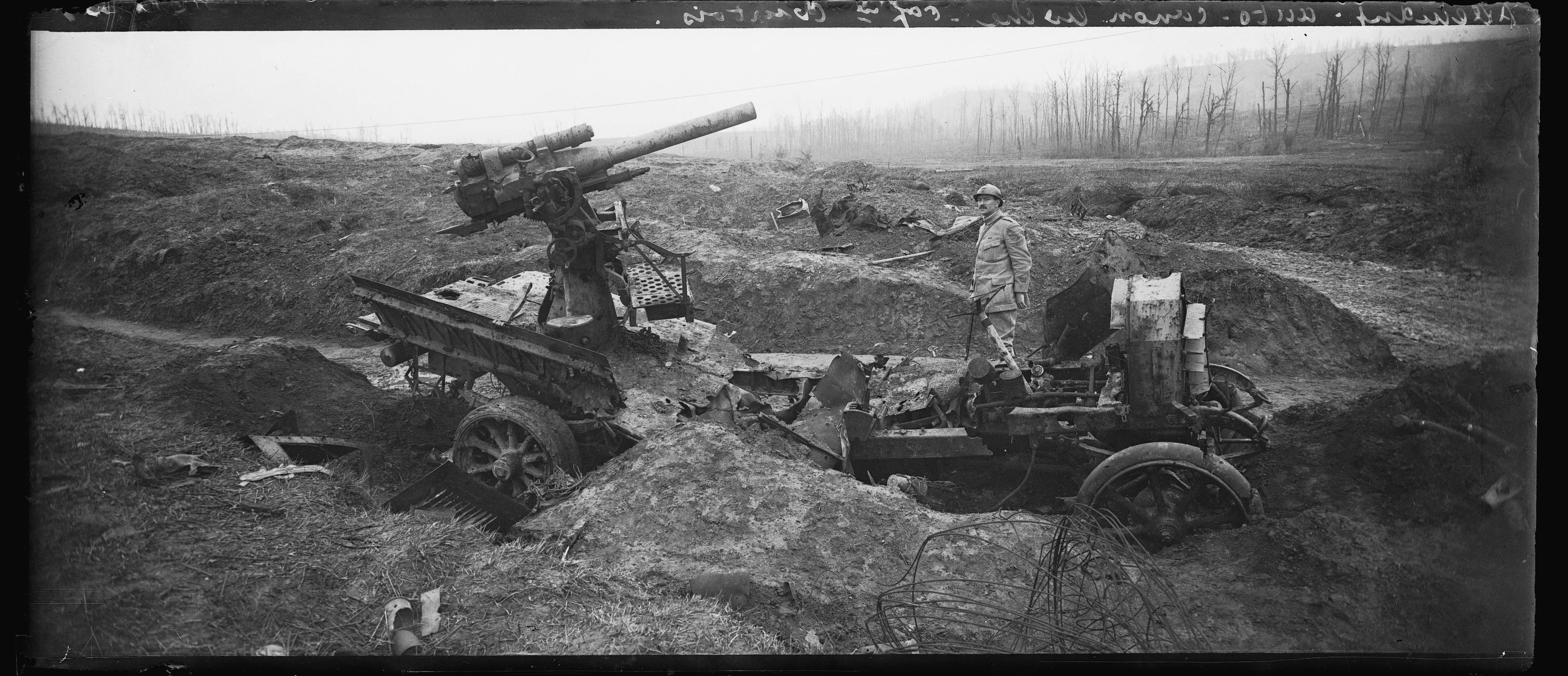
A destroyed Ehrhardt-Rheinmetall M1914
