= Bucharest Army Arsenal =

Main arsenal of the Romanian Army between 1861 and 1943

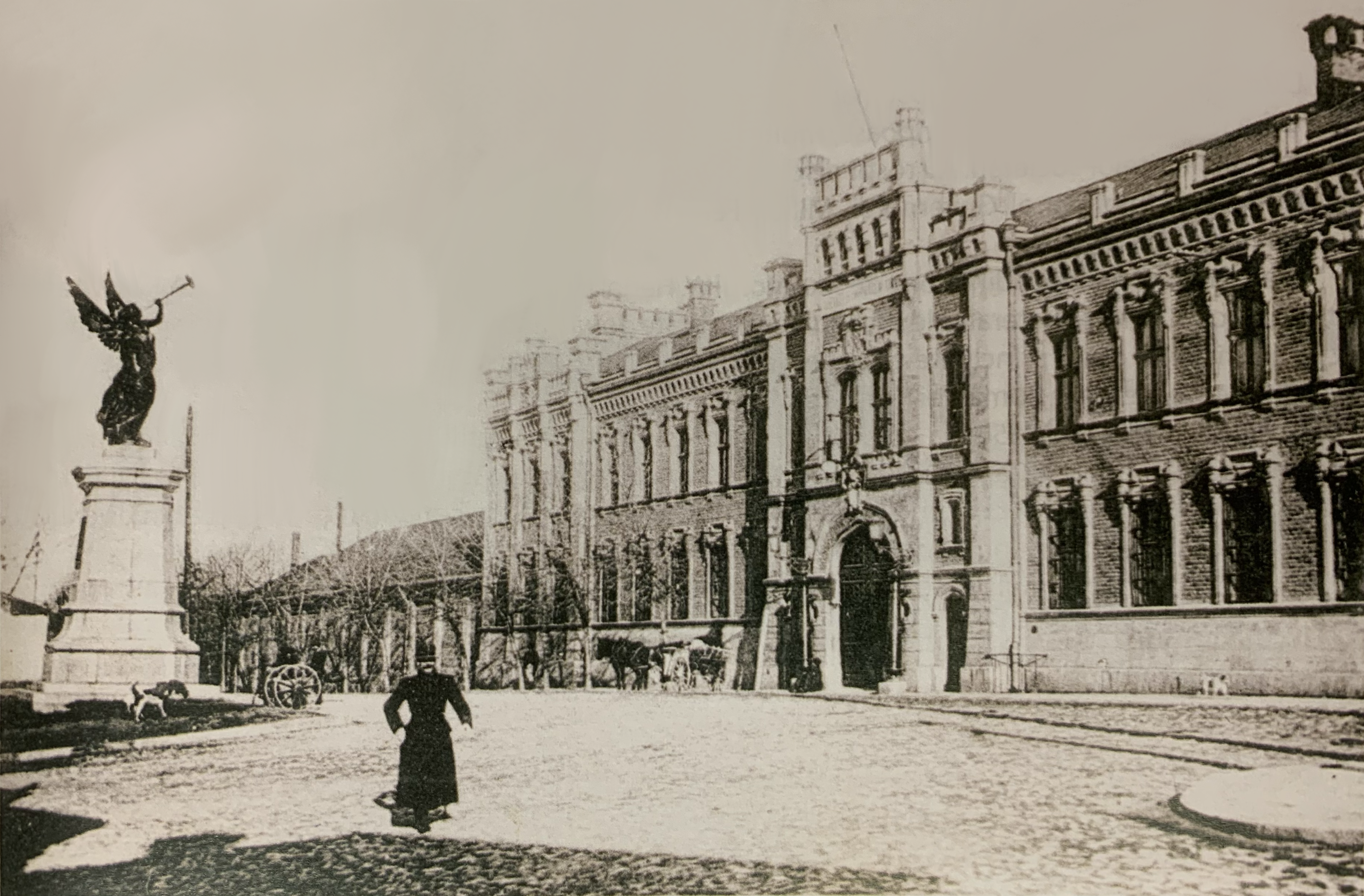
- The Army Arsenal building and the Monument of Firefighters
- Company type: Arsenal
- Founded: 1861; 165 years ago in Bucharest, Romania
- Defunct: 1943
- Fate: Merged with the Târgoviște Army Arsenal
- Key people: Henrich Herkt

The Army Arsenal of Bucharest (Romanian: Arsenalul Armatei din București) was the main arsenal of the Romanian Army, established in 1861 with the task of manufacturing, maintaining, and storing weapons, as well as limbers and caissons for the artillery. The old flags, uniforms, and weapons of the Romanian Army were also stored at the Arsenal until 1919.

== History ==
During the reign of Alexandru Ioan Cuza, the need for a modern Army Arsenal arose. Initially, the Arsenal, together with the Army Pyrotechnics were to be located at Malmaison. Soon however, it was decided to place them on Dealul Spirii, which gave the hill its alternate name of Dealul Arsenalului (Arsenal Hill). Work on the main building and gate of the Arsenal began in 1860, and was completed in 1861. The building was constructed in the neogothic style, and according to some researchers, designed by Luigi Lipizer.

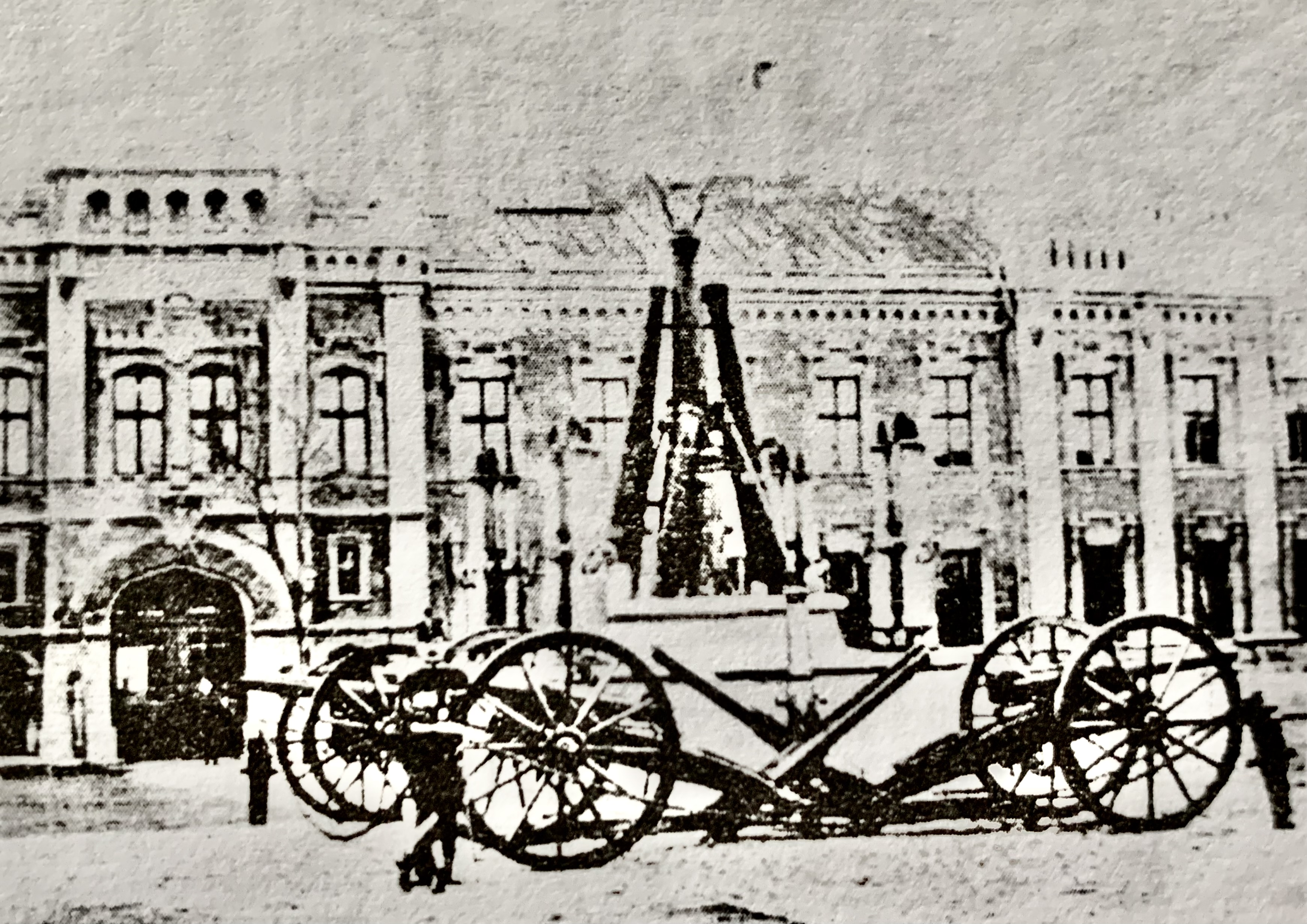
Main building and gate of the Army Arsenal

On 23 November 1861, the Artillery Material Establishments Directorate (Direcția Stabilimentelor de Material de Artilerie) composed of the Army Arsenal, the Army Pyrotechnics, and the Powder Factory which was located in Târgșor near Ploiești, was established. In 1873, the Pyrotechnics was separated from the Arsenal and moved to Cotroceni. Within the Arsenal, construction started on a Weapons Factory (Manufactura de Arme) in July 1863. The machines used in this factory were acquired from Belgium. In 1865, Colonel Henrich Herkt, who helped establish the Arsenal and the Pyrotechnics, presented an "artillery musketoon", and a "spahis rifle" manufactured at the establishments to Domnitor Cuza.

After the proclamation of the Kingdom of Romania in 1881, Carol I ordered that a steel crown from one of the cannons captured during the War of Independence should be manufactured at the Army Arsenal for himself. Designed by Theodor Aman, the Steel Crown of Romania was forged by the students and professional soldiers of the Arsenal from the front part of the barrel of a Krupp 90mm gun captured during the Battle of Plevna. The cannon was kept in the Museum of the Arsenal, then moved to the National Military Museum. With the establishment of the Order of the Crown of Romania, it was specified that the small crown from its center was to be made from the steel of the same gun as the crown.

=== 20th century ===
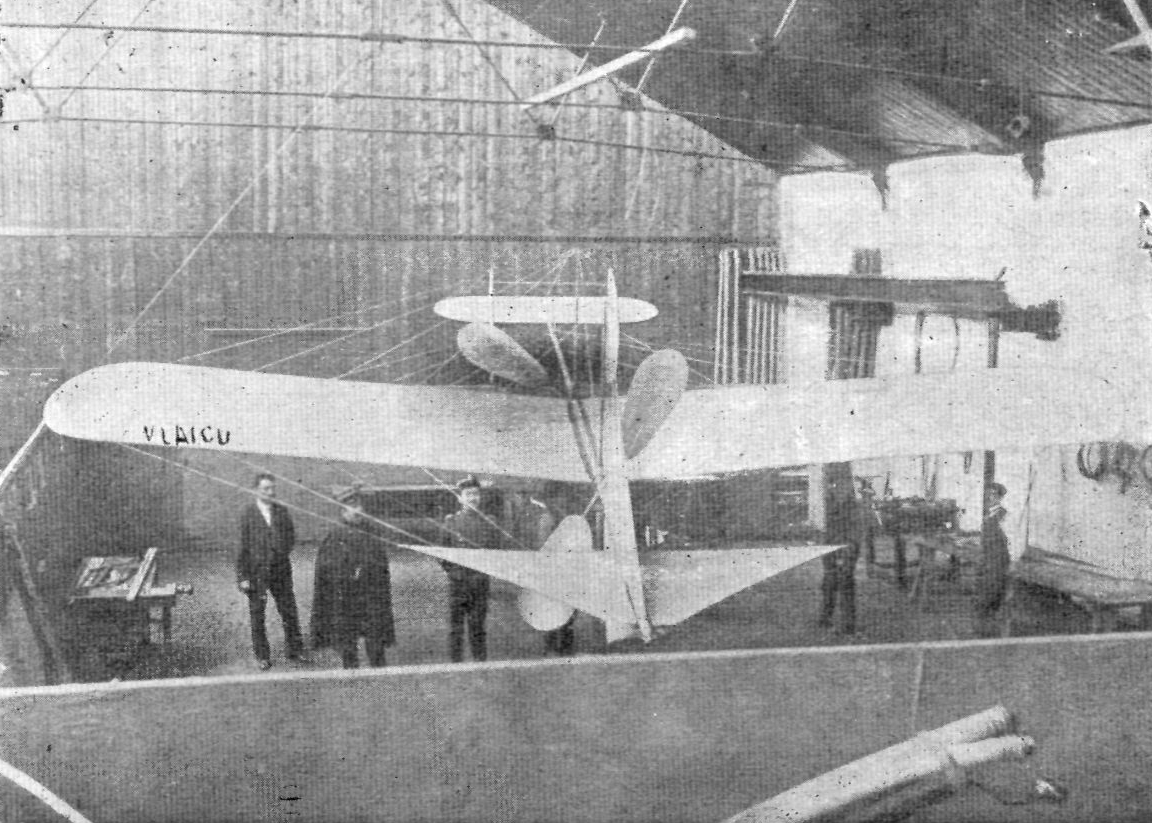
Vlaicu's aircraft at the Arsenal

In 1909, Aurel Vlaicu was commissioned by the Ministry of War to build his aircraft at the Army Arsenal. The A Vlaicu I was assembled at the Arsenal, and once the engine was mounted in 1910, the aircraft was also tested there. Before Vlaicu, Henri Coandă also worked at the Arsenal, constructing a model of a rocket-powered airplane.

During the First World War, in 1916, a number of 45 Model 1880 75 mm Krupp guns were modified for anti-aircraft use at the Arsenal. The Arsenal was also evacuated to Moldavia together the Pyrotechnics, and the Powder Factory.

Between 1928 and 1936, an apprenticeship school functioned at the Arsenal. In 1939, the school was re-established as the "School of Master Armorers and Artificers" (Școala de Maiștri Militari Armurieri și Artificieri) located near the Arsenal. On 1 July 1943, the Bucharest Army Arsenal was evacuated and merged with the Târgoviște Army Arsenal. The buildings of the former Arsenal were demolished to build the People's Palace in the 1980s.

== Artillery Museum ==
The first initiative of forming a military museum happened during Alexandru Ioan Cuza's reign when flags, uniforms, and weapons of the Romanian Army were stored at the Army Arsenal. The Artillery Museum (Muzeul Artileriei) was founded at the Arsenal in 1893. In 1914, it became a part of the National Museum of Antiquities.

In 1919, the Ministry of Agriculture and Domains ceded the Arts Palace and two other nearby buildings from the Carol Park to the Ministry of War. The exhibitions of the future National Military Museum were to be housed there.

== See also ==
- Arsenalul Aeronautic

== Bibliography ==
- Stroea, Adrian; Ghinoiu, Marin (2015). File din istoria artileriei. Fapte, întâmplări și oameni (in Romanian). Bucharest: Editura Centrului Tehnic-Editorial al Armatei. ISBN 9786065241510.
- Stroea, Adrian (2008). 165 ani de existență a artileriei române moderne (PDF) (in Romanian). Bucharest. Archived from the original (PDF) on 26 August 2011.
- Nestorescu, Valerian (1975). File din trecutul artileriei române moderne (in Romanian). Bucharest: Editura Militară. OCLC 20469821.
