= 8 cm L/30 M. 14 R. =

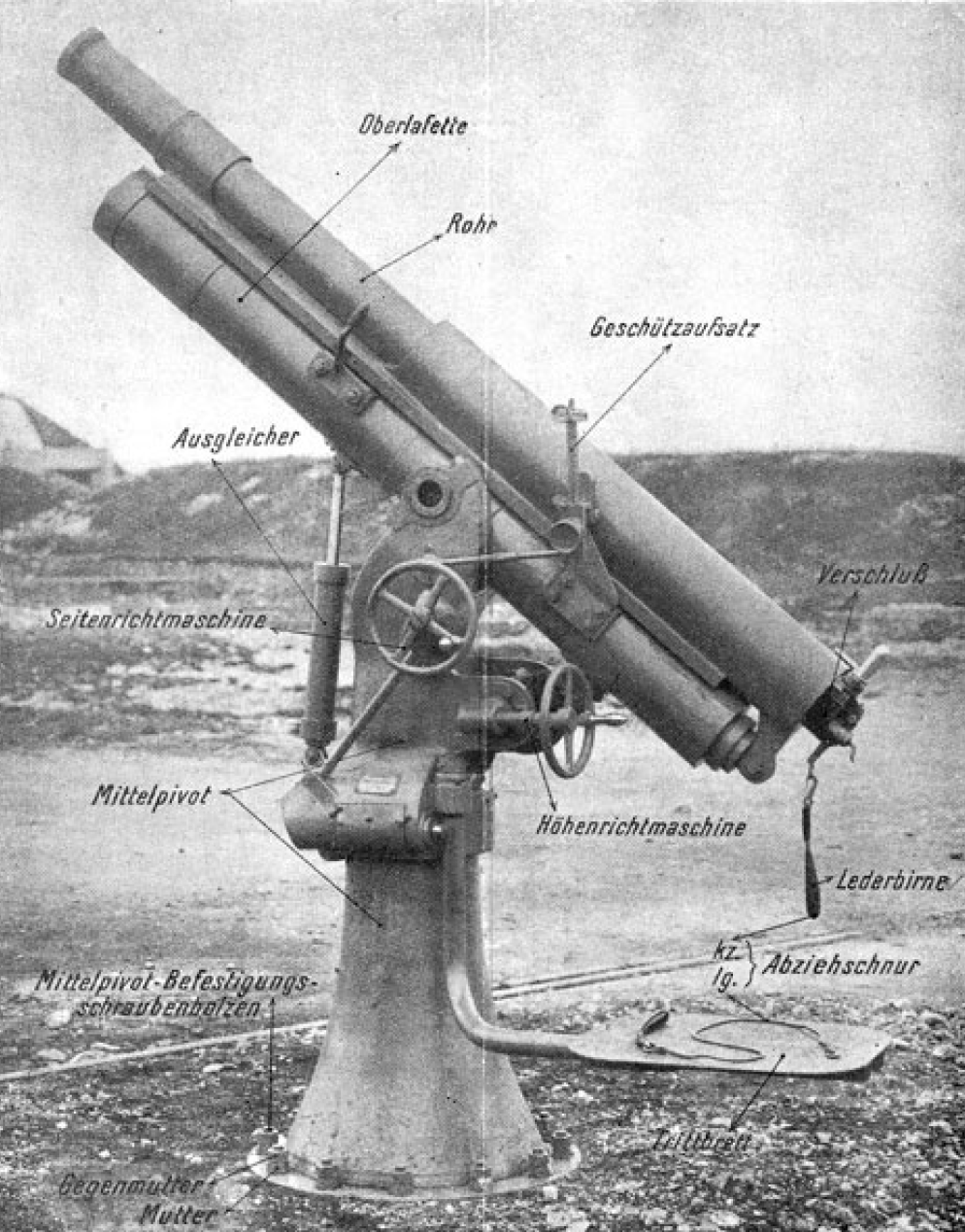
- Type: Anti-aircraft gun
- Place of origin: Russian Empire

Service history
- In service: 1914–1918
- Used by: Austro-Hungarian Empire
- Wars: World War I

Production history
- Designer: Putilov
- Designed: 1902
- Produced: 1914

Specifications
- Mass: 2.71 t
- Barrel length: 2.28 m (7 ft 6 in) L/30
- Shell: Fixed QF 76.2 x 385mm R
- Shell weight: 7.5 kg (16 lb 9 oz)
- Caliber: 76.2 mm (3.00 in)
- Breech: Interrupted screw
- Recoil: Hydro-pneumatic
- Carriage: HA/LA Pedestal Mount
- Elevation: -7° to +75°
- Traverse: 360°
- Rate of fire: 15 rpm
- Muzzle velocity: 580 m/s (1,900 ft/s)
- Effective firing range: Horizontal: 9.4 km (5.8 mi); Vertical: 5,600 m (18,400 ft)

The 8 cm L/30 M. 14 R. (R = Russia), was an Austro-Hungarian 76.2 mm anti-aircraft gun during the First World War.

== History ==
The origins of the 8 cm L/30 M. 14 R. go back to the Russian 76 mm divisional gun M1902 field gun which was captured in large numbers during the first two years of World War I. A combination of factors led to the Austro-Hungarian Army to issue M1902's to their troops as replacements.

These included:

- An underestimation of light field artillery losses during the first two years of the war and an inadequate number of replacement guns being produced.
- An underestimation of ammunition consumption, inadequate production capacity, and resulting shortages.
- The superior ballistic performance of the M1902 compared to Austro-Hungarian designs.

At first, all of the combatants employed field guns on improvised anti-aircraft mounts, which were typically earthen embankments or scaffolds to get the muzzle pointed skyward. Later in the war, specialized anti-aircraft mounts were developed. Once adequate numbers of new field guns such as the 8 cm FK M. 17 were being produced obsolete types such as the 8 cm FK M. 5 and captured guns such as the M1902 were withdrawn from front-line service and issued to anti-aircraft units. The 8 cm FK M. 5 was converted to anti-aircraft use by placing it on a HA/LA Pedestal Mount and redesignated the 8 cm M. 14.

== Design ==
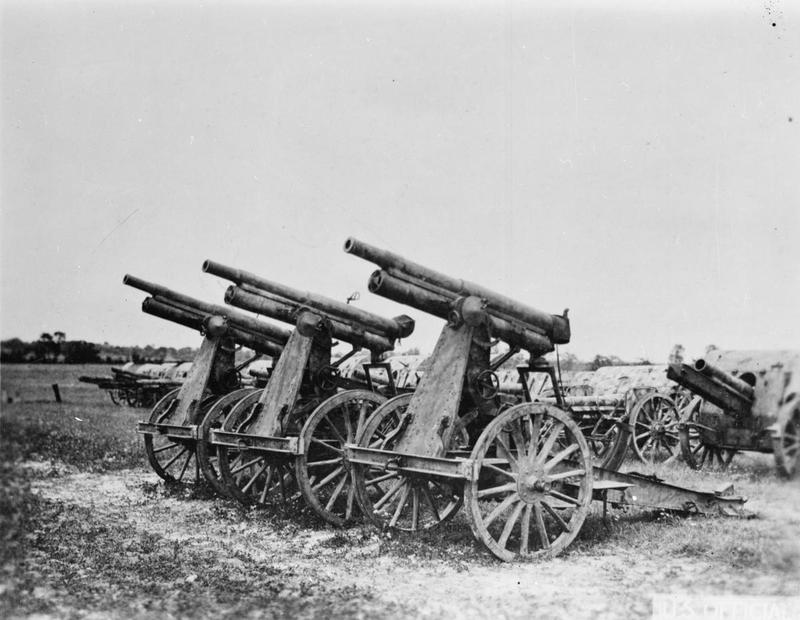
Three captured German 7.62 cm FlaK L30 anti-aircraft guns.

Like the 8 cm FK M. 14 the 8 cm L/30 M. 14 R. was a conversion of captured M1902 barrels and recoil mechanisms that were placed on high-angle pedestal mounts for the anti-aircraft role. Although designated 8 cm the gun was not bored out to use Austro-Hungarian 76.5 mm ammunition and fired captured Russian 76.2 mm ammunition. The 8 cm designation was due to the Austro-Hungarians rounding up to the next highest centimeter for their artillery designations. The reason why the M1902 was not converted was its steel was brittle and didn't take well to reboring.

The 8 cm L/30 M. 14 R. were immobile and the pedestal was bolted to a concrete slab, the elevation range was between −7 and +75 degrees and had 360 degrees of traverse. The sights were rudimentary but later in the war telescopic sights were developed. The 6.6 kg (14 lb 9 oz) projectile had a muzzle velocity of 580 m/s (1,900 ft/s) for a horizontal range of 9.4 km (5.8 mi) and a maximum altitude of 5,600 m (18,400 ft).

The German's also converted captured M1902 barrels and recoil mechanisms into anti-aircraft guns and gave them the designation 7.62 cm FlaK L30.

== Bibliography ==
- German Artillery:1914-1918. Pen & Sword Military. 2015.
- Das Gerät der leichten Artillerie, IV. Teil, Flugabwehrwaffen. Bernard & Graefe. 1929.
- Artillerieunterricht, 8 cm M. 14 R Lfa-Kanone (mit Mittelpivot). 1916.
