= Târgoviște Army Arsenal =

Coordinates: 44°55′27.7″N 25°27′41.9″E

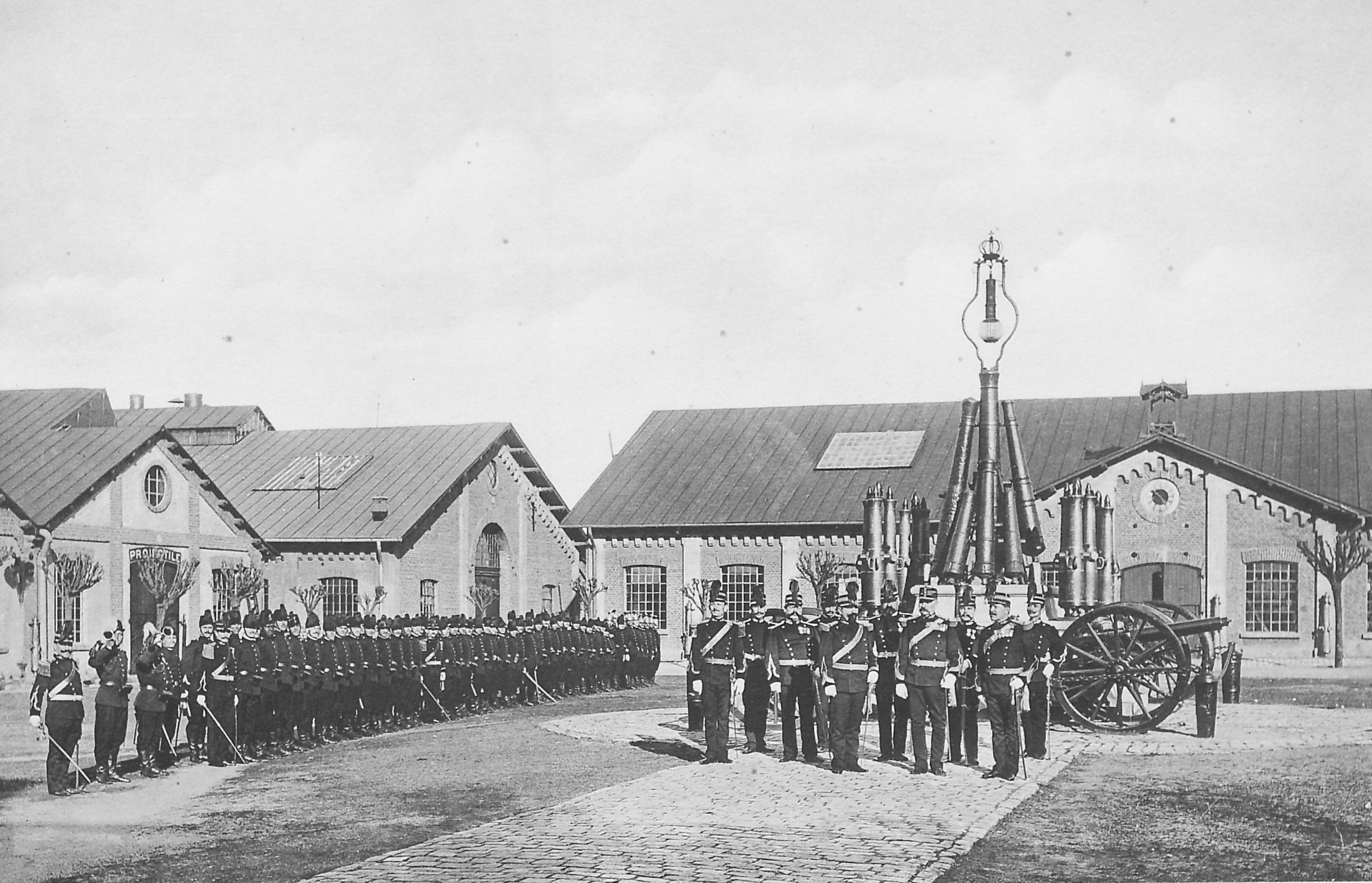
- The Arsenal in 1902
- Company type: Arsenal
- Founded: 1864; 162 years ago in Târgoviște, Romania
- Defunct: 1945
- Successor: UPET

Initially established as the Army Foundry (Romanian: Fonderia Armatei) through a decree issued by Domnitor Alexandru Ioan Cuza in 1864, the Târgoviște Army Arsenal (Arsenalul Armatei din Târgoviște) became an arsenal of the Romanian Army in 1872, being renamed as such in 1876. Between 1876 and 1935, it mainly functioned as a storage arsenal. During the Second World War, various weapons and equipment were repaired here.

== History ==
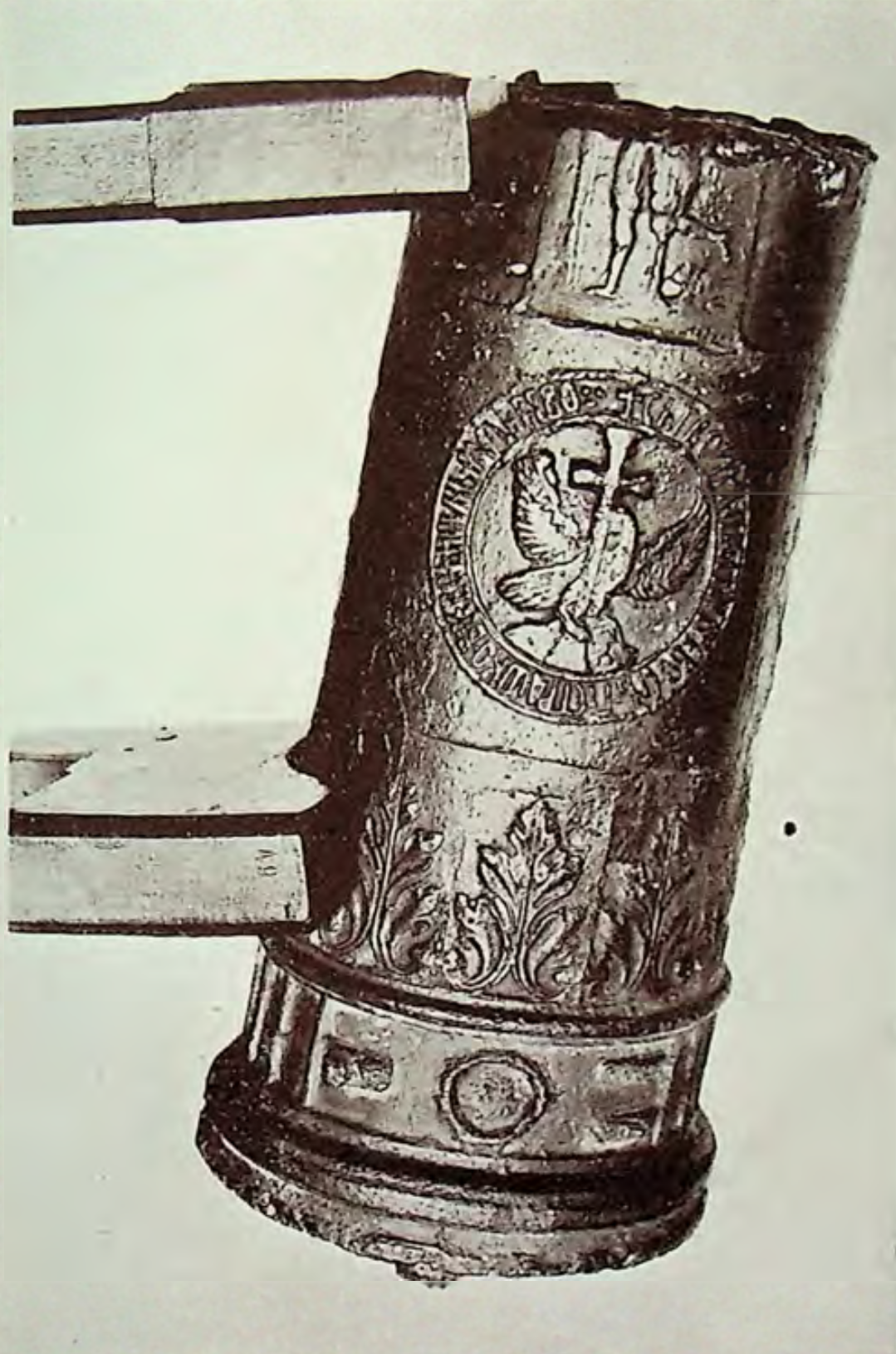
Fragment of a cannon forged at Petru Cercel's foundry

=== Petru Cercel's cannon foundry ===
With the help of Venetian craftsmen, Voivode Petru Cercel established the first bronze cannon and munitions foundry of Wallachia in 1583. It was located at the Princely Court of Târgoviște. The cannons built there featured the coat of arms of Wallachia, around which the following Slavonic inscription was written: "Io Petru Voivode, son of Pătrașcu - Voivode, grandson of Radu - Voivode, made [this cannon]".

These artillery pieces were kept in the palace courtyard. The foundry functioned until the end of Petru Cercel's reign.

=== 19th century ===
On 21 July 1864, the establishment of a cannon foundry was approved by Alexandru Ioan Cuza, and a decree for its construction was issued on 4 August 1864. Initially it was to be placed on the ruins of the Princely Palace, where Petru Cercel established his foundry, and a weapons warehouse was to be founded at the Dealu Monastery as well. Since the place was unsuitable, it was instead decided to build the Foundry in the gardens and the cemetery of the Metropolitan Cathedral of Târgoviște. The foundation stone was placed on 1 July 1865 in the presence of Prefect Dimitrie Florescu, Mayor Gheorghe Ludescu, the councilors, and many citizens of Târgoviște, and in September, a sum of 438,000 lei was allocated for the construction of the Foundry, woodworking workshops, warehouses, and other associated buildings, including a guardhouse.

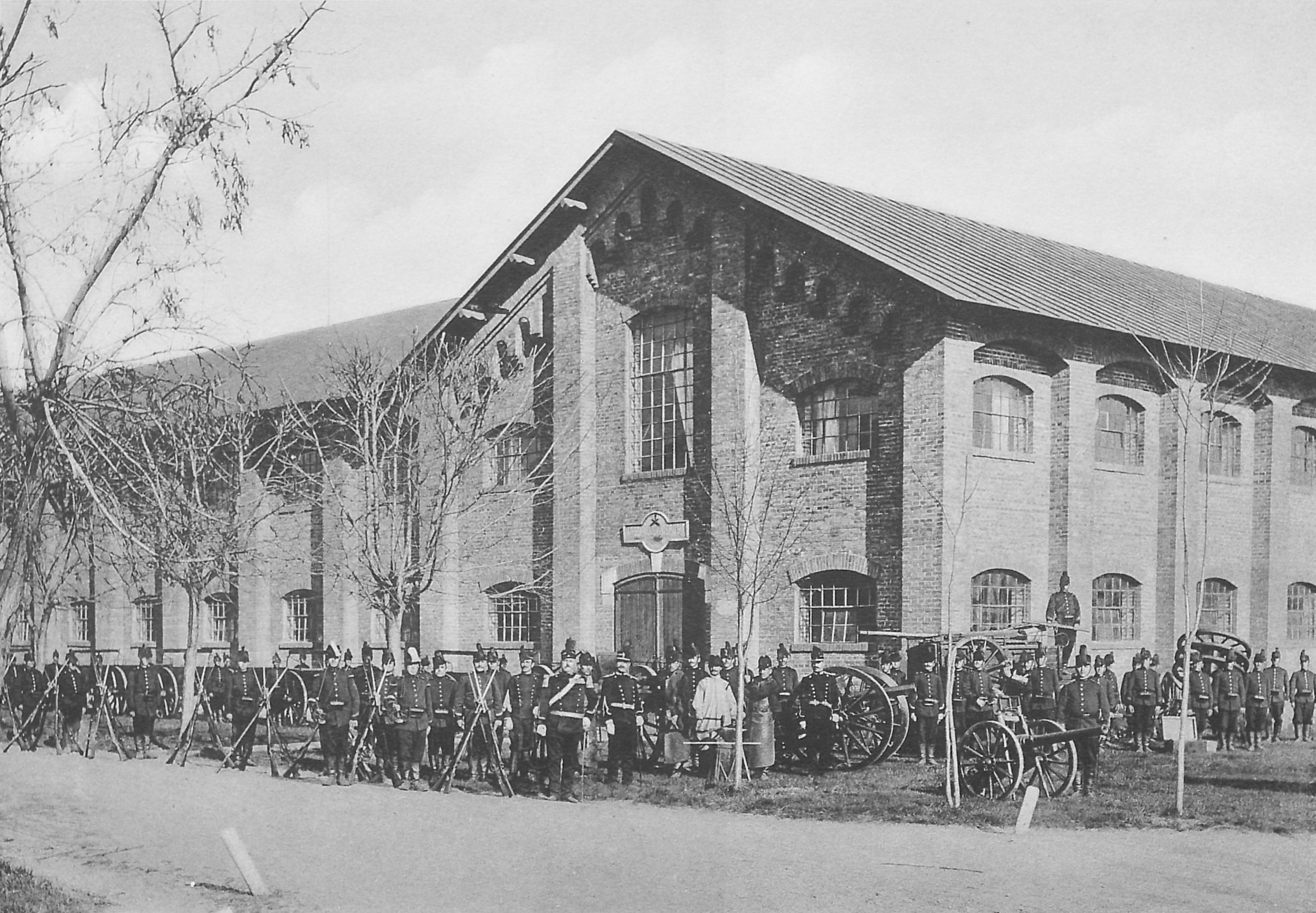
Târgoviște Army Arsenal

After the abdication of Cuza, the works were suspended, being placed under the watch of military guards. Construction works restarted in 1868, with the woodworking shop, an administration building, some warehouses, and the guardhouse being completed in 1869. In March 1872, General Florescu requested funds for finishing the works. The Foundry received the necessary equipment for the production of cannons and gun carriages, and was placed under the command of Major Scarlat Cristodorescu. It was officially inaugurated in September 1872.

In 1875, a military hospital was set up at the Foundry. In December 1876, the Foundry became a storage Arsenal. The machines of the factory were transferred to the main Arsenal in Bucharest, while its armory workshops were to function as a branch of the Bucharest Arsenal. In 1887, it became the Central Artillery Depot Arsenal (Arsenal de Depozit Central de Artilerie), and in 1904 it was linked to the CFR station by a rail line up to the premises of the Arsenal.

=== 20th century ===
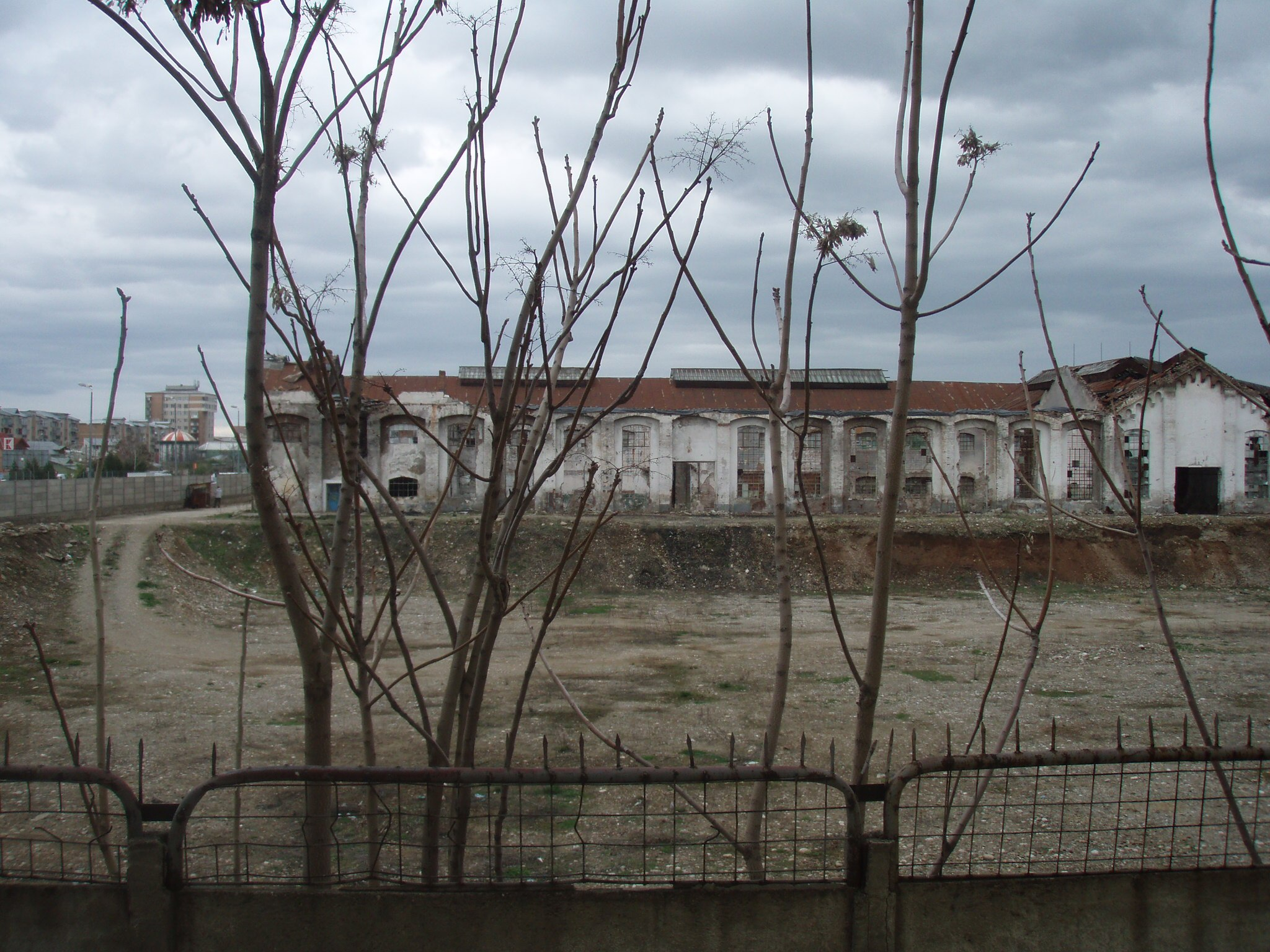
Buildings of the former Arsenal

At the start of the century, the Arsenal had its own firefighter service, which also served the town in return for an annual subsidy. Between 1916 and 1918, during the German occupation, a prisoner-of-war camp functioned at the Arsenal. On 2 November 1918, troops of the German Army set fire to the Arsenal. The fire, however, was quickly put out and the damage was repaired. In 1935, the Arsenal received the name "Front Arsenal" (Arsenal de Front), and its focus was shifted towards manufacturing and repairs, but it was also used as a storage arsenal. Between 1941 and 1942, repair works on various guns, mortars, howitzers, and other equipment were carried out at the Arsenal. In 1943, the Bucharest Arsenal was evacuated to Târgoviște and was merged with the Târgoviște Arsenal, and in 1944, the Roman Arsenal was partially evacuated as well which led to a diversification of the works carried out in Târgoviște. By that the end of the war, 3,000 workers were employed at the Arsenal.

On 8 August 1945, the Arsenal was renamed to the "Gheorghe Gheorghiu-Dej" CFR Workshops and put under the Directorate of CFR workshops. In 1949, it was taken over by the Ministry of Heavy Industry and eventually transformed into the Târgoviște Petroleum Equipment Plant (Uzina de Utilaj Petrolier Târgoviște - UPET). In the 1980s, housing blocks were built on the land of the former Arsenal. After 1989, commercial spaces began appearing on the UPET factory site. In May 2008, the former Arsenal, and some of the historical halls were registered in the list of historical monuments under the DB-II-a-B-17182, and the DB-II-m-B-17182(.01, .02, and .03) LMI codes.

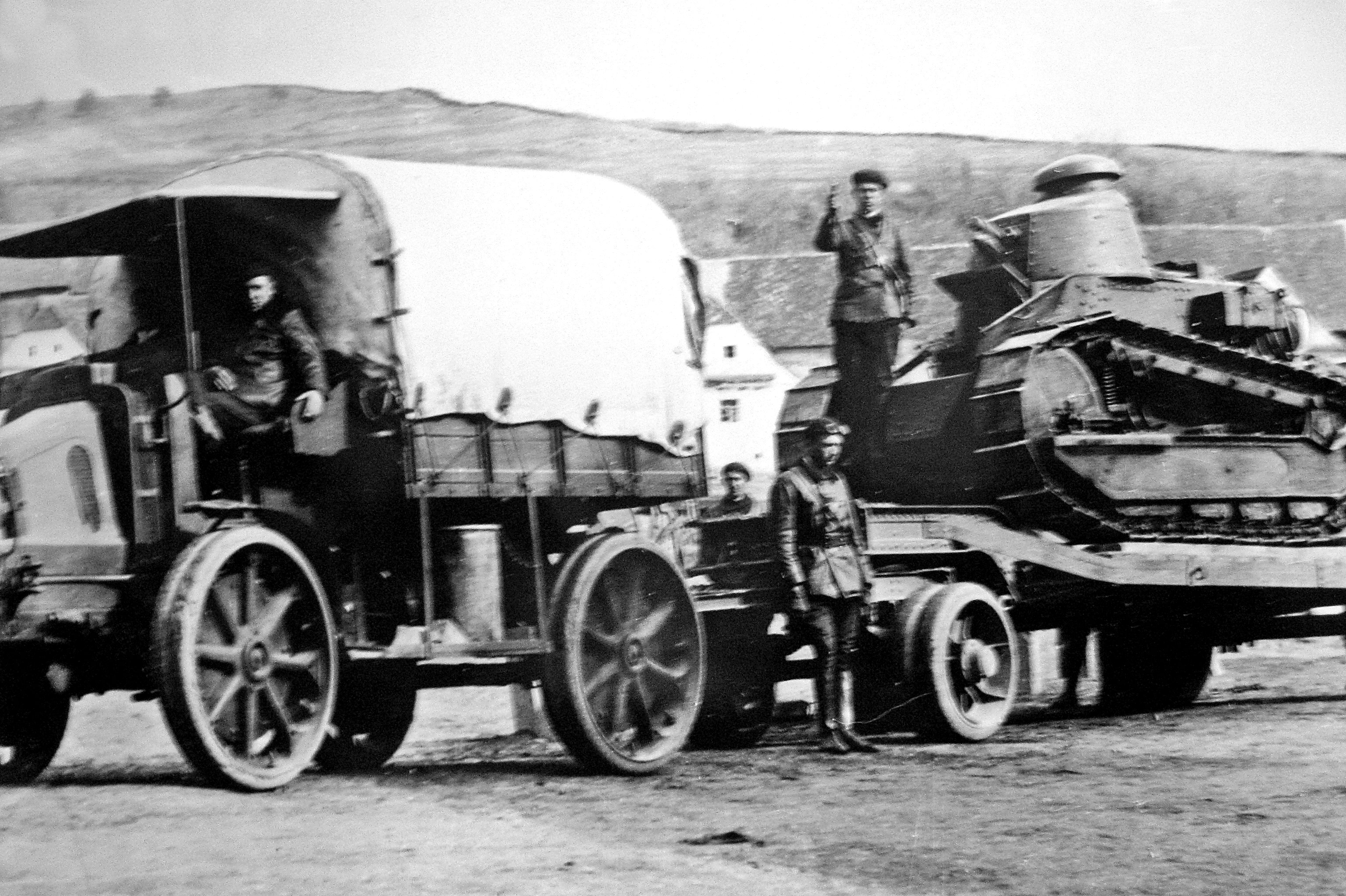
A Renault FT at Târgoviște, towed by a Latil TAR truck

== The tank regiment ==
In 1919, the first Renault FT tanks of the Tank Battalion (Batalionul Carelor de Asalt) were brought to Târgoviște from Mihai Bravu. The tanks were housed at the Army Arsenal. In 1921, the Tank Battalion became the Tank Regiment (Regimentul Carelor de Asalt) and was later moved to a barracks in the Teiș neighborhood. After a reorganization in 1939, the 1st Tank Regiment was headquartered in former buildings of the Arsenal.

== Bibliography ==
- Boriga, Gabriel Florin; Moțoc, Honorius; Stan, Mihai; Coandă, George; Petrescu, Victor; Boriga, Niculae Alexandru (2012). Enciclopedia orașului Târgoviște (PDF). Târgoviște: Bibliotheca. ISBN 9789737126795. Archived from the original (PDF) on 5 April 2023.
- Stroea, Adrian (2008). 165 ani de existență a artileriei române moderne (PDF) (in Romanian). Bucharest. Archived from the original (PDF) on 26 August 2011.
- Denize, Eugen (2002). Italia și italienii in cultura română (in Romanian). Editura Mica Valahie. ISBN 9738511771.
