= 7.62 cm FlaK L/30 =

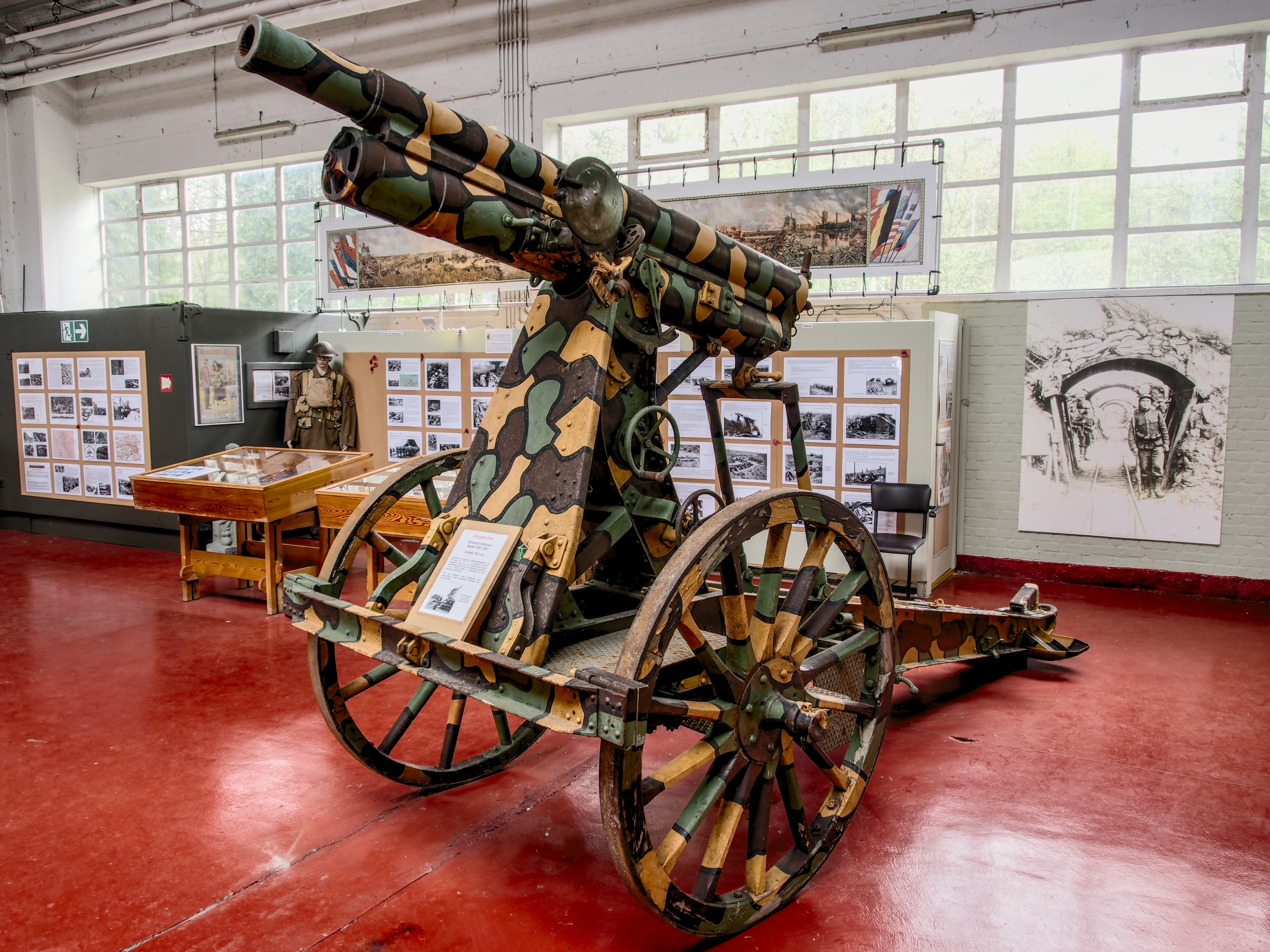
- A Krupp 7.62 cm FlaK L/30 AA gun at the Gunfire Museum Brasschaat.
- Type: Anti-aircraft gun
- Place of origin: Russian Empire

Service history
- In service: 1914–1918
- Used by: German Empire
- Wars: World War I

Production history
- Designer: Putilov
- Designed: 1902
- Manufacturer: Krupp
- Produced: 1914
- No. built: 120

Specifications
- Mass: Travel: 2,440 kg (5,380 lb); Combat: 1,350 kg (2,980 lb)
- Barrel length: 2.28 m (7 ft 6 in) L/30
- Shell: Fixed QF 76.2 x 385mm R
- Shell weight: 7.5 kg (16 lb 9 oz)
- Caliber: 76.2 mm (3.00 in)
- Breech: Interrupted screw
- Recoil: Hydro-pneumatic
- Carriage: Box trail
- Elevation: +12° to +70°
- Traverse: 360°
- Rate of fire: 12 rpm
- Muzzle velocity: 588 m/s (1,930 ft/s)
- Effective firing range: Horizontal: 8.5 km (5.3 mi); Vertical: 5,600 m (18,400 ft)

The 7.62 cm FlaK L/30 was a German 76.2 mm anti-aircraft gun produced by Krupp during the First World War.

== History ==
The origins of the 7.62 cm FlaK L/30 go back to the Russian 76 mm divisional gun M1902 field gun which was captured in large numbers during the first two years of World War I. A combination of factors led the Germans to issue M1902's to their troops as replacements.

These included:

- An underestimation of light field artillery losses during the first two years of the war and an inadequate number of replacement guns being produced.
- An underestimation of ammunition consumption, inadequate production capacity, and resulting shortages.
- The superior ballistic performance of the M1902 compared to German designs.

Once adequate numbers of new field guns such as the 7.7 cm FK 16 were being produced obsolete types such as the 9 cm Kanone C/73 and captured guns such as the M1902 and Canon de 75 modèle 1897 were withdrawn from front-line service and issued to anti-aircraft units. At first, all of the combatants employed field guns on improvised anti-aircraft mounts, which were typically earthen embankments or scaffolds to get the muzzle pointed skyward. Later in the war, specialized anti-aircraft mounts were developed.

== Design ==
The 7.62 cm FlaK L/30 was a conversion of captured M1902's that were placed on high-angle mounts for the anti-aircraft role. Unlike the 7.7 cm FlaK L/35, which was bored out to fire German ammunition the 7.62 cm FlaK L/30 could fire Russian or German made ammunition. The reason why the M1902 was not converted was that the steel it was made from was brittle and didn't take well to reboring. The conversion was mainly focused on modifying the M1902's carriage to accommodate a pedestal mount which allowed up to 70° of elevation and a travel lock on the recoil mechanism. In the field, the guns were anchored to a firing ring to allow 360° of traverse. At least 120 guns were converted by Krupp during World War I.

== Photo Gallery ==
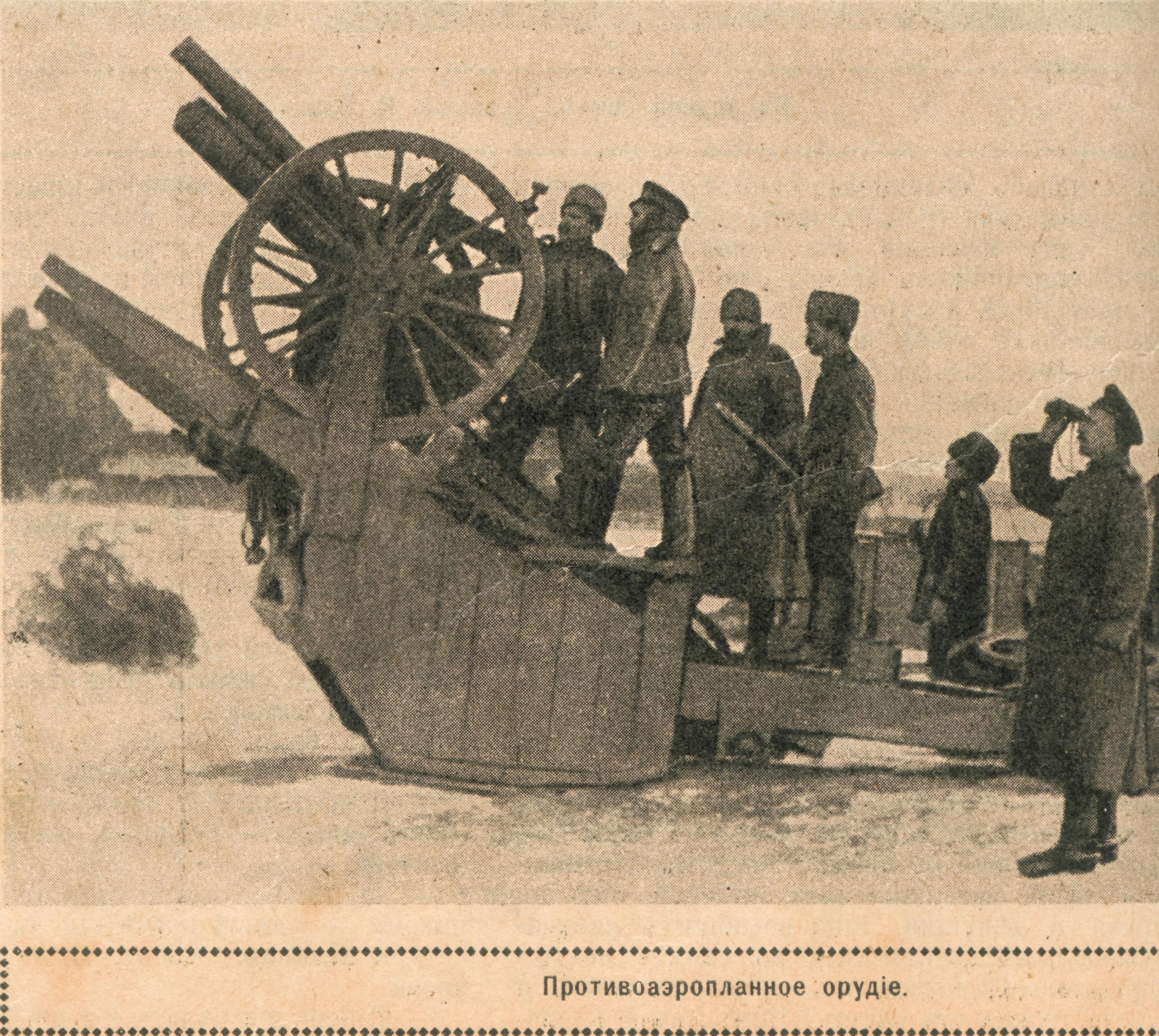
AN M1902 on a Russian flak mounting

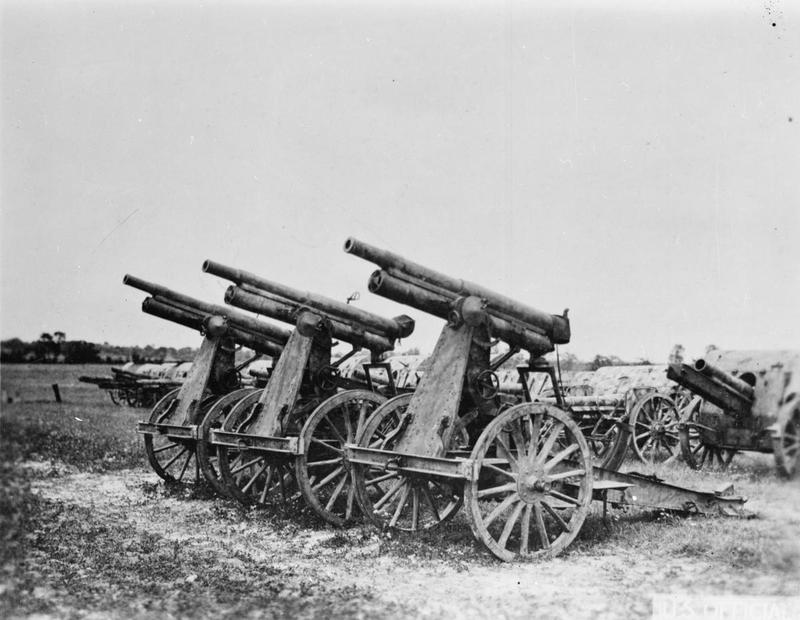
Three FlaK L30s captured at Chateau Thierry by the US 1st Division

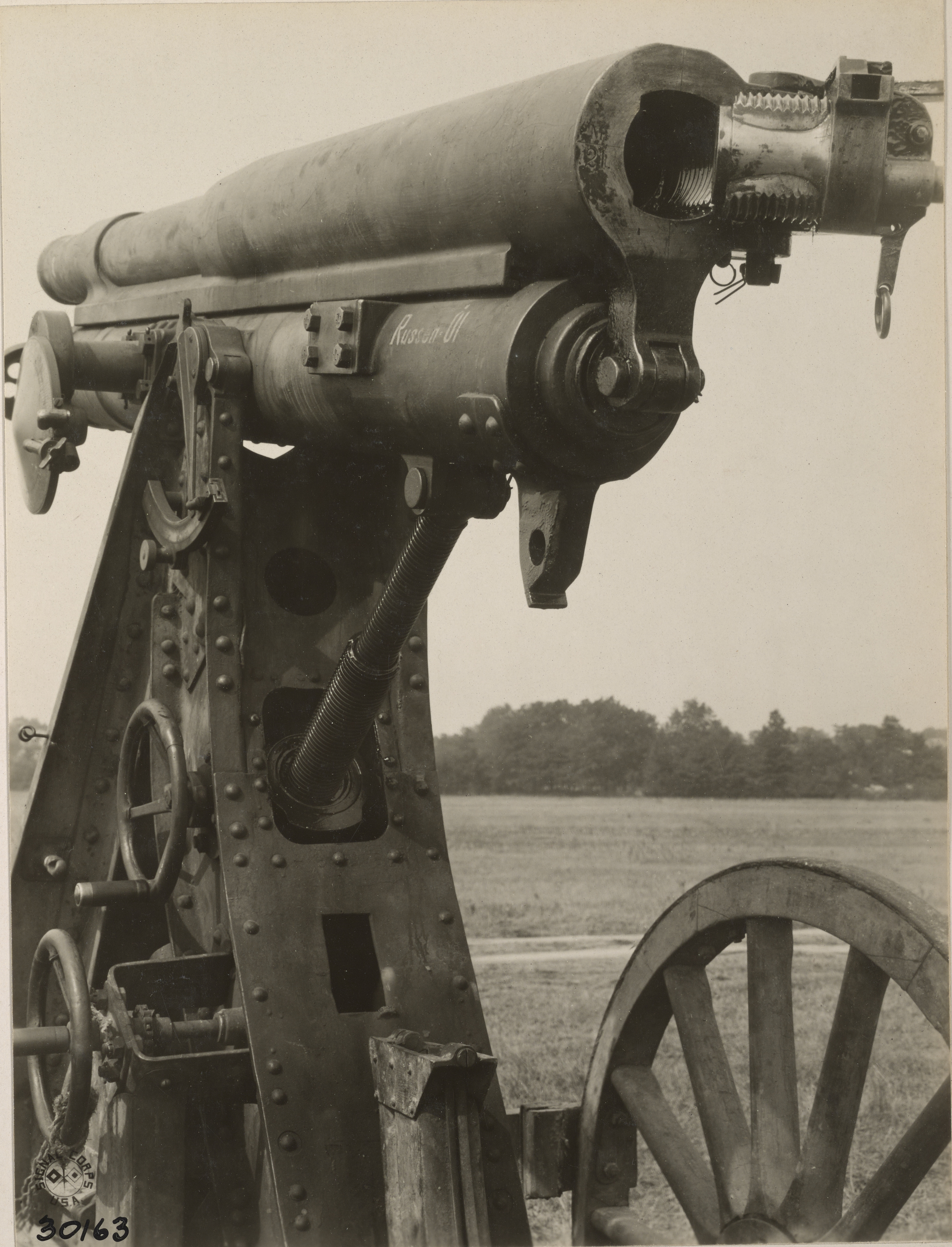
A view of the FlaK L30's unmodified breech

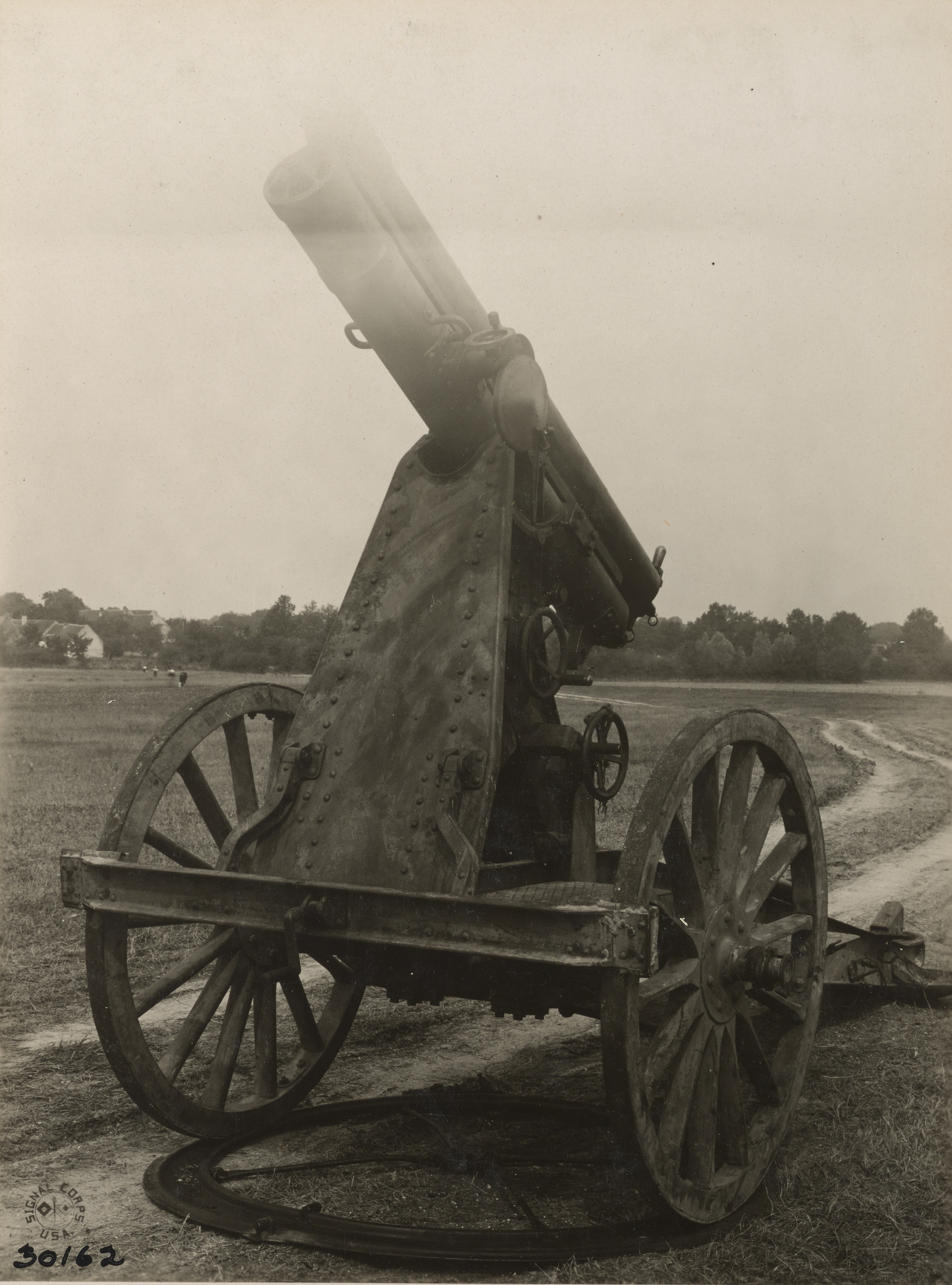
A view of the FlaK L30 on its firing ring
