= 7.7 cm FlaK L/35 =

WW1-era German anti-aircraft gun

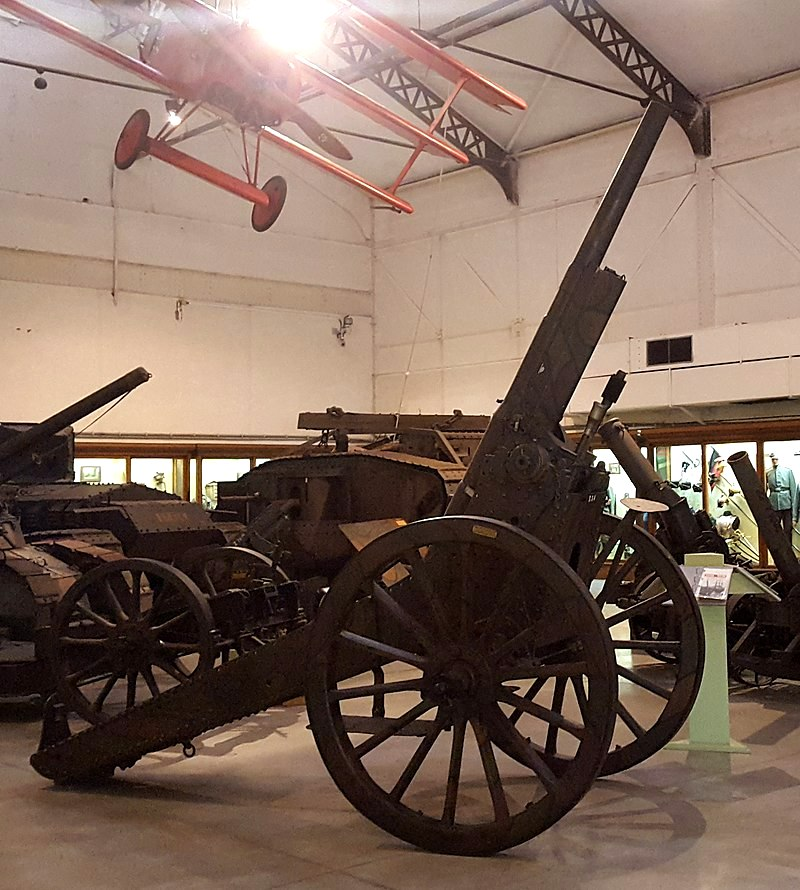
- A Krupp 7.7 cm FlaK L/35 AA gun at the Musée Royal de l'Armée, Brussels.
- Type: Anti-aircraft gun
- Place of origin: German Empire

Service history
- In service: 1914–1918
- Used by: German Empire
- Wars: World War I

Production history
- Designer: Schneider et Cie
- Designed: 1897
- Manufacturer: Krupp
- Produced: 1914
- No. built: 394

Specifications
- Mass: Travel: 2,050 kg (4,520 lb); Combat: 1,250 kg (2,760 lb)
- Barrel length: 2.7 m (8 ft 10 in) L/35
- Shell: Fixed QF
- Shell weight: 6.85 kg (15 lb 2 oz)
- Caliber: 77 mm (3.0 in)
- Breech: Nordenfelt eccentric screw
- Recoil: Hydro-pneumatic
- Carriage: Box trail
- Elevation: +1° to +60°
- Traverse: 360°
- Rate of fire: 12 rpm
- Muzzle velocity: 487 m/s (1,600 ft/s)
- Effective firing range: Horizontal: 7.2 km (4.5 mi); Vertical: 4,000 m (13,000 ft)

The 7.7 cm FlaK L/35 was a German 77 mm anti-aircraft gun produced by Krupp during the First World War.

== History ==
The origins of the 7.7 cm FlaK L/35 go back to the French Canon de 75 modèle 1897 field gun which was captured in large numbers during the first two years of World War I. A combination of factors led the Germans to issue M1897's to their troops as replacements.

These included:

- An underestimation of light field artillery losses during the first two years of the war and an inadequate number of replacement guns being produced.
- An underestimation of ammunition consumption, inadequate production capacity, and resulting shortages.
- The superior ballistic performance of the M1897 compared to German designs.

Once adequate numbers of new field guns such as the 7.7 cm FK 16 were being produced obsolete types such as the 9 cm Kanone C/73 and captured guns such as the M1897 and 76 mm divisional gun M1902 were withdrawn from front-line service and issued to anti-aircraft units. At first, all of the combatants employed field guns on improvised anti-aircraft mounts, which were typically earthen embankments or scaffolds to get the muzzle pointed skyward. Later in the war, specialized anti-aircraft mounts were developed.

== Design ==
The 7.7 cm Flak L/35 was a conversion of captured M1897's that were bored out to fire German 7.7 cm ammunition and placed on high angle mounts for the anti-aircraft role. When the barrels became worn out they were replaced with German made ones of the same length without the distinctive muzzle roller guides of the French gun. The first of these conversions were from Krupp. It consisted of mounting bored out barrels on modified de Bange 120 or 155 carriages to allow up to 60° of elevation. In the field, the guns were anchored to a firing ring to allow 360° of traverse. By Spring of 1916, every division had a two gun platoon for AA defense and 394 guns were converted.

== Photo Gallery ==
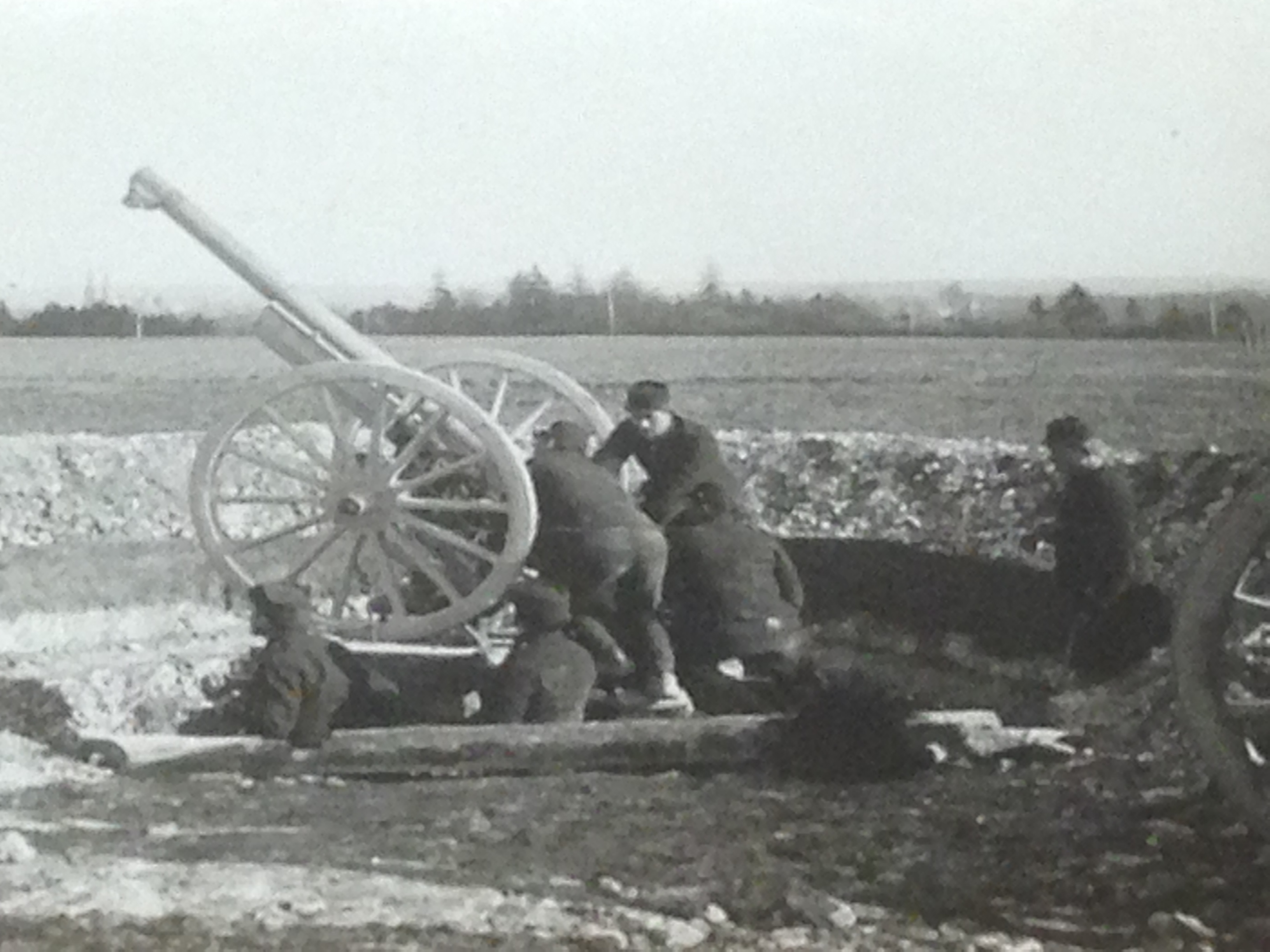
An improvised anti-aircraft mount with a mle 1897.

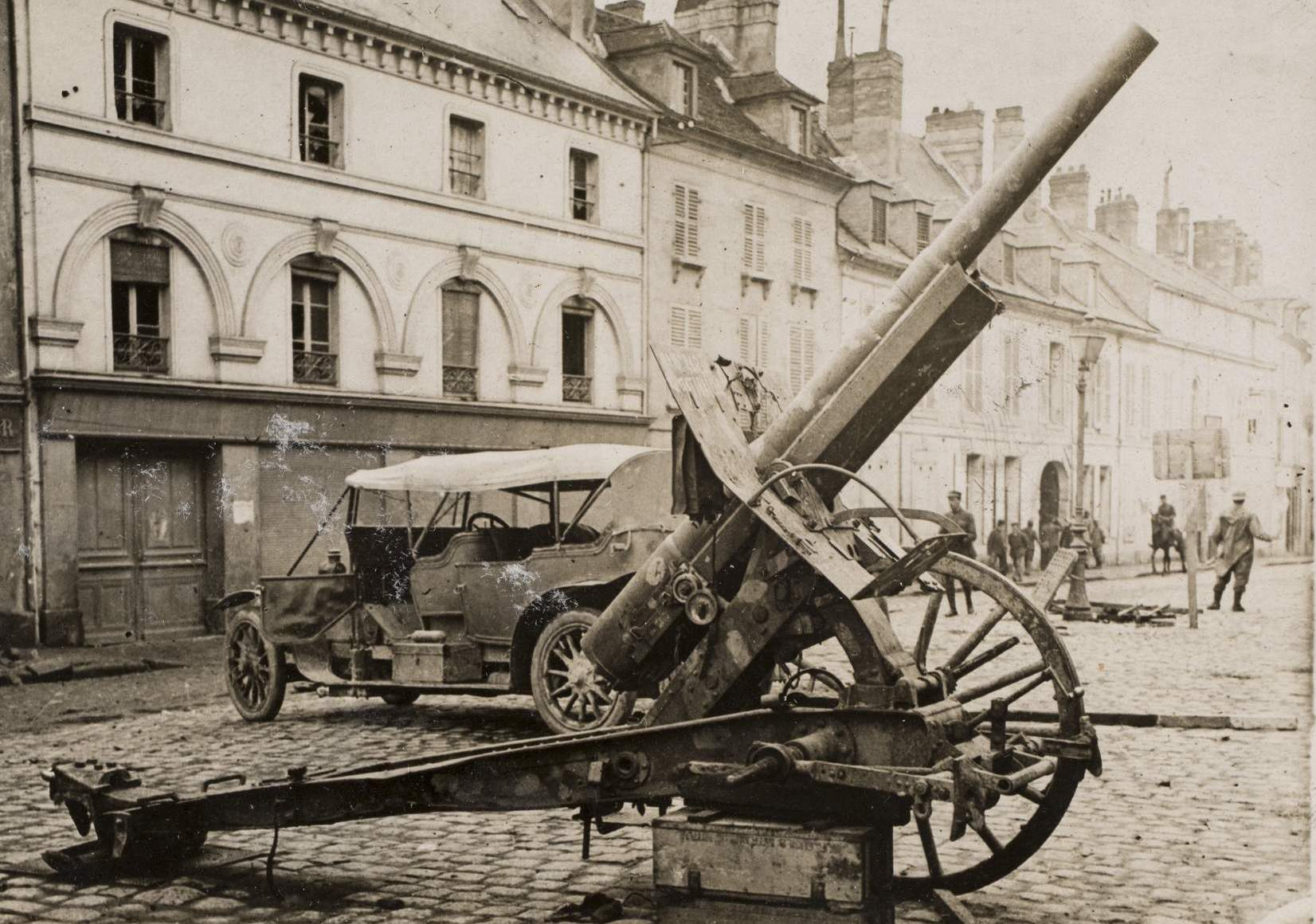
A damaged FlaK L/35 with replacement barrel captured by the allies on display.

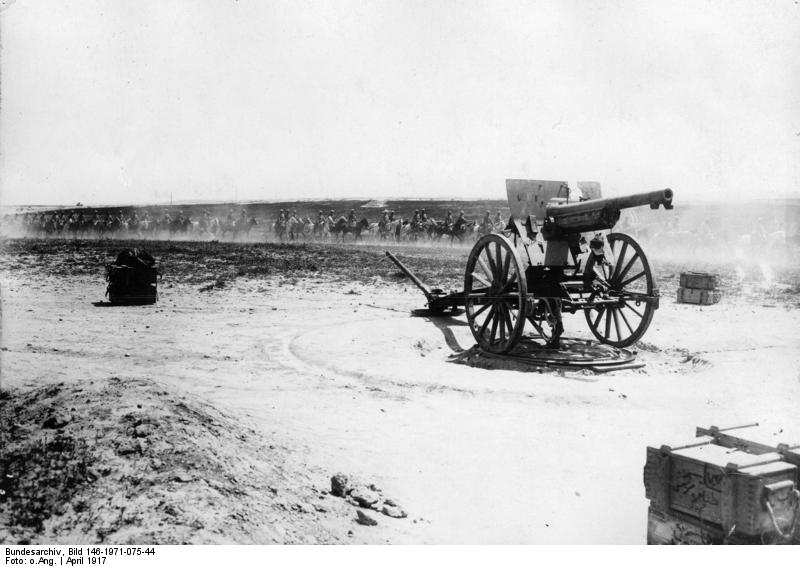
A FlaK L/35 with original barrel on its firing ring.

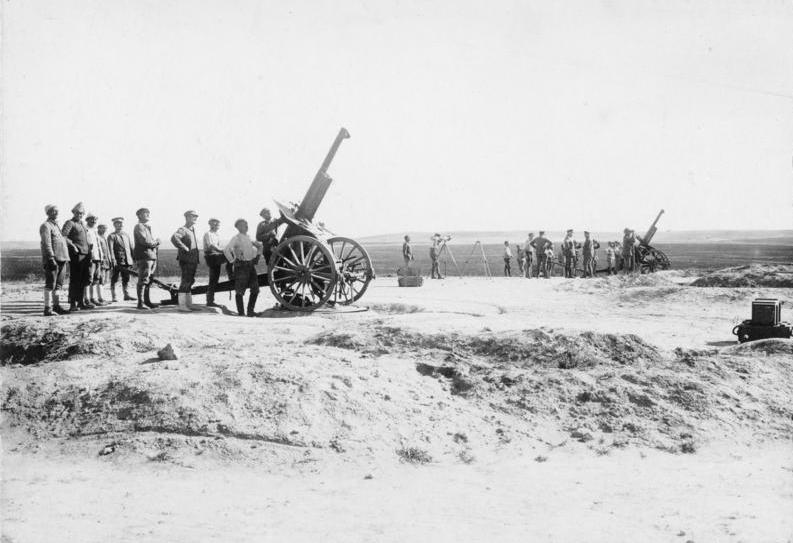
A FlaK L/35 battery in Palestine.
