= 9 cm Kanone C/73 =

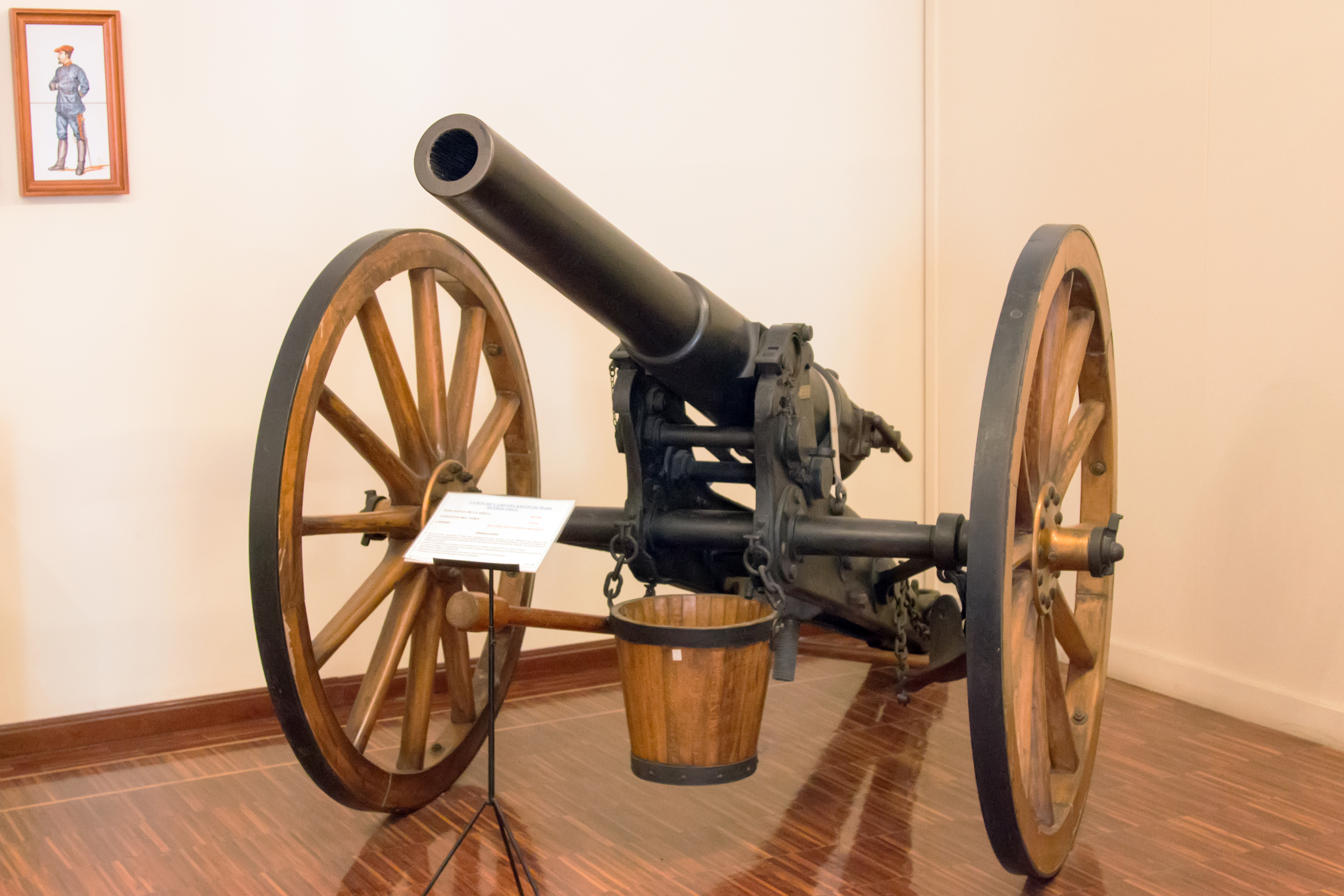
- A 9 cm Kanone C/73 at the Museo Histórico Militar de Valencia.
- Type: Field gun
- Place of origin: German Empire

Service history
- In service: 1873−1922
- Used by: See users
- Wars: See wars

Production history
- Designer: Krupp
- Designed: 1873
- Manufacturer: Krupp
- Produced: 1873−1891
- Variants: 9 cm K C/79 (bronze barrel); 9 cm K C/73-88 (light barrel); 9 cm K C/73-91 (nickel-steel)

Specifications
- Mass: Travel: 2,515 kg (5,545 lb); Combat: 1,210 kg (2,670 lb)
- Barrel length: 2.1 m (6 ft 11 in) L/24
- Shell: Separate-loading, bagged charges and projectiles
- Shell weight: HE: 7.2 kg (15 lb 14 oz); Shrapnel: 8.1 kg (17 lb 14 oz)
- Caliber: 88 mm (3.5 in)
- Breech: Horizontal sliding-block
- Recoil: None
- Carriage: Box trail
- Elevation: -15° to +16°
- Traverse: None
- Rate of fire: 10 rpm
- Muzzle velocity: 464–442 m/s (1,520–1,450 ft/s)
- Effective firing range: 6.5 km (4 mi)
- Maximum firing range: 7.1 km (4.4 mi)

The 9 cm Kanone C/73 was a field gun developed after the Franco-Prussian War and used by Germany before and during World War I.

== History ==
After the Franco-Prussian War, the German Army began to study replacements for its existing C/61 steel breech-loaded cannons. Although the C/61 had outclassed its bronze muzzle-loaded French rivals during the war, its Wahrendorff breech was unpopular with gun crews. The new gun, designated the “C/73”, retained the same 88 mm (3.5 in) ammunition as the C/61 and was assigned to the field artillery regiments of the Army. The German and Austro-Hungarian Army during that period rounded up to the nearest centimeter.

In addition to the German Army, C/73s also armed the Ottoman Empire and a number of the Balkan states. The Balkan states either bought them from Germany, built them under license or inherited Ottoman guns after they left the region. Although largely replaced by the German Army before the First World War, a combination of higher than expected losses and insufficient ammunition production led to the C/73 being brought out of reserve and issued as replacements to field artillery regiments. Some C/73s are believed to have been used by Turkey as late as 1922.

Once adequate numbers of new field guns such as the 7.7 cm FK 16 were being produced, obsolete types such as the 9 cm Kanone C/73 and captured guns such as the 76 mm divisional gun M1902 and Canon de 75 modèle 1897 were withdrawn from front-line service and issued to anti-aircraft units. At first, all of the combatants employed field guns on improvised anti-aircraft mounts, which were typically earthen embankments or scaffolds to get the muzzle pointed skyward. Later in the war, specialized anti-aircraft mounts were developed. In 1918, it was estimated that there were still 614 C/73s and C79s deployed in that role.

== Design ==
Although made of steel like its predecessor, the C/73 was of built-up construction with a central rifled tube, a reinforcing hoop from the trunnions to the breech and a larger propellant chamber for higher muzzle velocities and greater range. The C/73 featured a new breech, known as a cylindro-prismatic breech, which was a predecessor of Krupp's horizontal sliding-block, and the gun used separate-loading, bagged charges and projectiles.

The C/73 had a box trail carriage built from bolted steel plates instead of wood. The C/73 did not have a recoil mechanism or a gun shield. For transport, the gun was attached to a limber for towing by a six-horse team. The limber also had seats for crew members plus ammunition and supplies. There were also seats attached to the axle of the gun carriage for the crew.

In addition to the original steel barrel, a hardened bronze barrel was introduced in 1879 and that gun was designated as the 9 cm Kanone C/79. A change from black powder to smokeless powder propellant was addressed during 1888 by adopting a new barrel with the designation C/73-88. Later, a new nickel-steel barrel was introduced in 1891 to address premature barrel explosions by shells filled with picric acid. These were given the designation C/73-91.

== Users ==
- German Empire
- Albania
- Kingdom of Bulgaria
- Chile
- Kingdom of Greece
- Korean Empire
- Kingdom of Montenegro
- Ottoman Empire
- Kingdom of Romania
- Kingdom of Serbia
- Spain

== Wars ==
- Russo-Turkish War
- First Boer War
- War of the Pacific
- Greco-Turkish War (1897)
- Second Boer War
- Boxer Rebellion
- Herero Wars
- Italo-Turkish War
- Balkan Wars
- World War I
- Greco-Turkish War (1919–1922)

== Photo Gallery ==
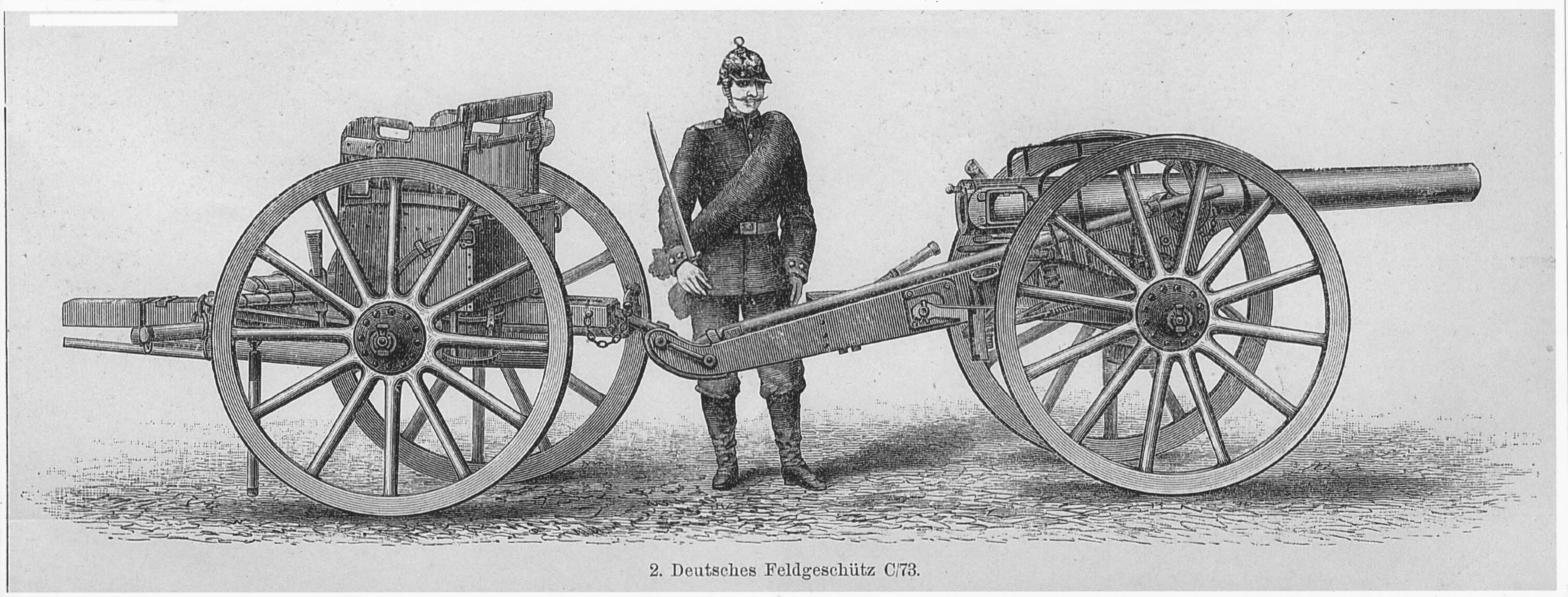
A C/73 with limber.

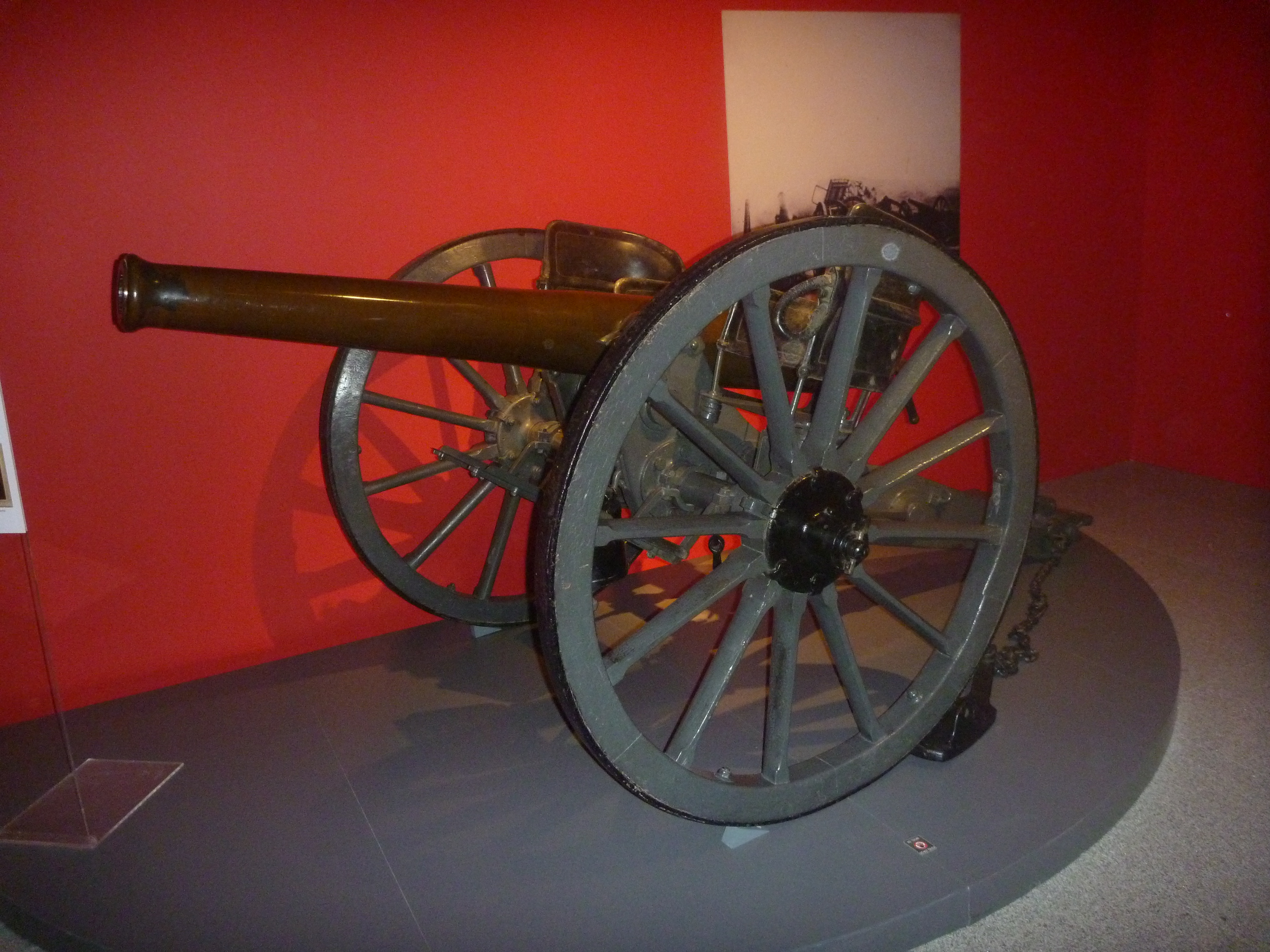
A Spanish built bronze barrelled Modelo 1878.

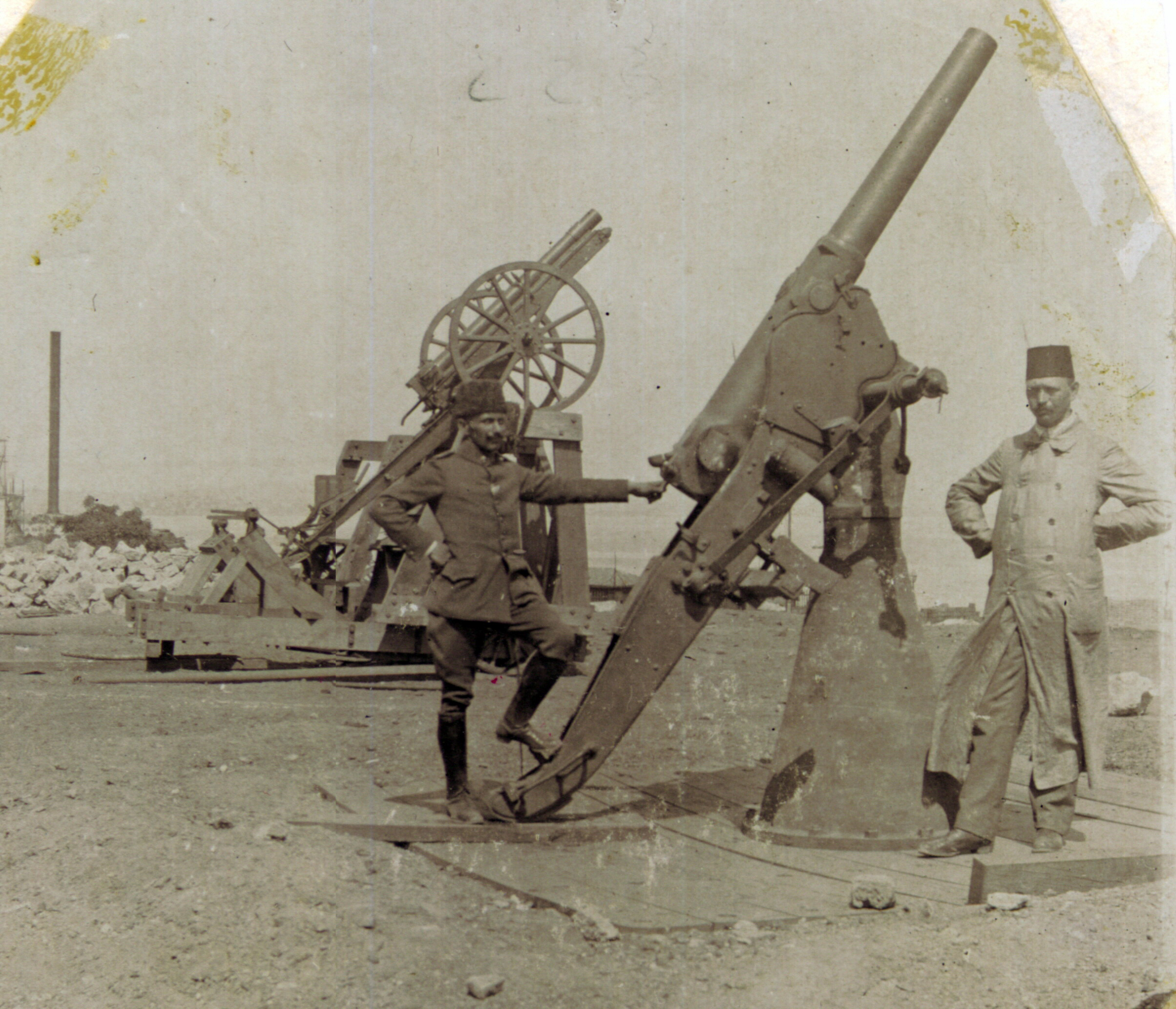
A Turkish gun converted to anti-aircraft use.

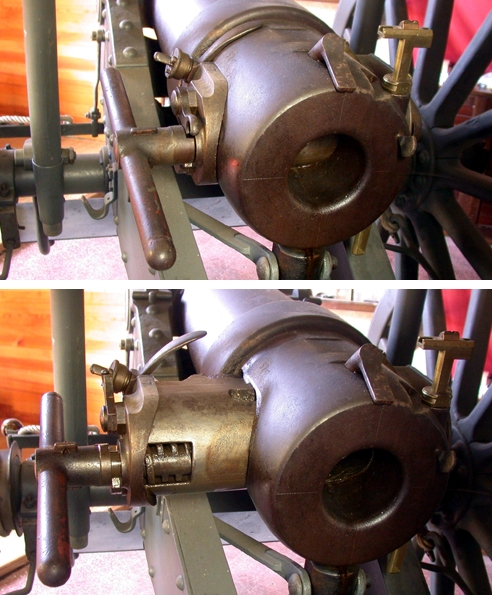
The breech of an early Krupp gun.
