= 76 mm divisional gun M1902 =

Imperial Russian field gun

76-mm divisional gun model 1902
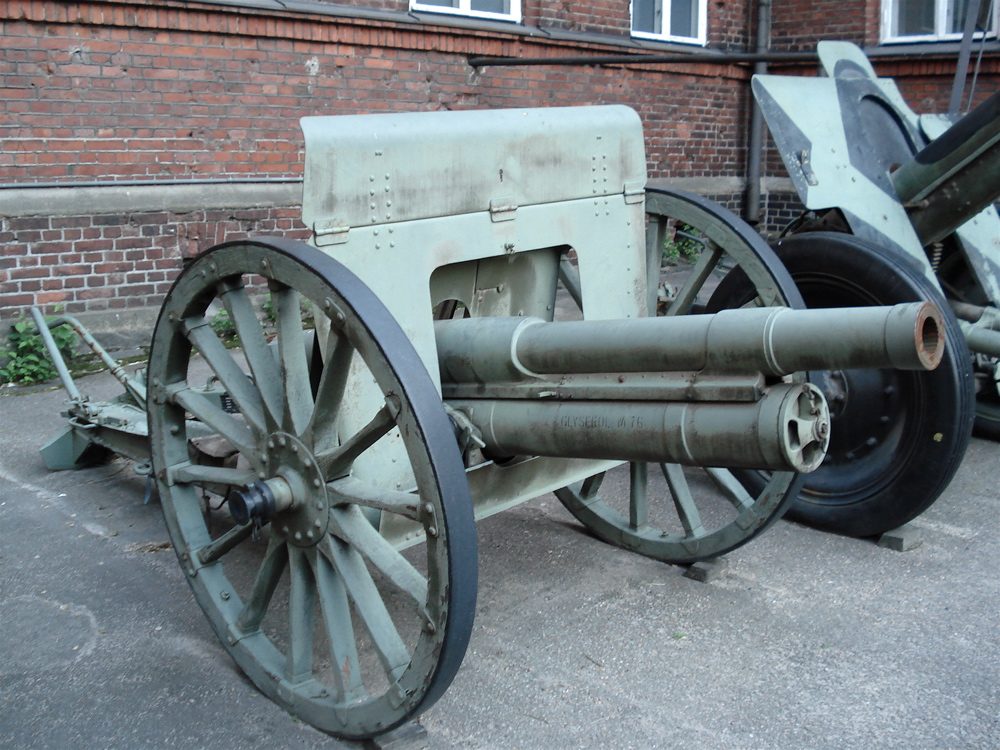
- 76-mm divisional gun model 1902 in the Finnish Military Museum, Helsinki, Finland.
- Type: Field gun
- Place of origin: Russian Empire

Production history
- Produced: 1903–1931

Specifications
- Mass: combat: 1,092 kg (2,407 lbs) travel: 2,380 kg (5,247 lbs)
- Barrel length: 2.28 m (7 ft 6 in) 30 calibers
- Shell: Fixed QF 76.2 x 385mm R
- Shell weight: 7.5 kg (17 lb)
- Caliber: 76.2 mm (3 in)
- Breech: Interrupted screw
- Carriage: Pole trail
- Elevation: −3° to 17°
- Traverse: 5°
- Rate of fire: 10–12 rpm
- Muzzle velocity: 589 m/s (1,930 ft/s)
- Maximum firing range: 8.5 km (5.28 mi)

The 76.2 mm divisional gun model 1902 (Russian: 76-мм дивизионная пушка образца 1902 года) was a Russian light field gun used in the Russo-Japanese War, World War I, the Russian Civil War, and a number of interwar armed conflicts with participants from the former Russian Empire (the Soviet Union, Poland, Finland, Estonia, etc.). Modernized versions of this gun were employed in the early stages of World War II.

== History ==
This gun, known as the "three-incher", (трёхдюймовка) was developed by Putilovski Works in Saint-Petersburg in 1902. The lead designers were L. A. Bishlyak, K. M. Sokolovskiy, and K. I. Lipnitskiy. It incorporated many new features for that time: a carriage with recoil devices, traverse and elevation tracking mechanisms, a precision sight for direct and indirect firing, a manual interrupted screw breech, and single-piece ammunition loading.

To simplify the mass production process, the designers used cheap types of carbonized steel in the gun's construction, without or with minimal use of rare and expensive nickel-, manganese- or chromium-added types of steel. Early versions had two seats for the crew, one on each sides of the barrel; from 1906, the seats were replaced with an armoured shield. The shield had a specific design: an outer shield with a large rectangular opening and a smaller, inner shield behind it. The upper and lower portion of the outer shield were folded during transport.

The gun had fragmentation, shrapnel and canister ammunition. More specialized types of projectiles included smoke, incendiary, and chemical rounds. Many ammunition pieces were French originated. Limbers could carry 40 or 44 rounds in a light artillery and 28 rounds in a mounted artillery, while caissons carried 48 rounds in both cases.

== Employment ==
=== Russo-Japanese War ===
M1902 divisional guns were the mainstay of the Russian Empire’s artillery and were well received by the army. Their characteristics were on par with comparable 75 mm French and German guns. The gun first saw action during the Russo-Japanese War at the Battle of Telissu, but it proved ineffective due to a lack of crew training and outdated concepts held by senior artillery officers.

=== World War I ===
The M1902 was also used during World War I. After the collapse of the Russian Empire in 1917, M1902 guns were employed by different factions: the Red Army, the monarchist or counter-revolutionary White Guard, nationalist forces in Russian-minority areas, the national armies of Poland and Finland, and even anarchists and bandits throughout the vast territories of the former Russian Empire. In some episodes the gun saw its first anti-tank usage. The White Guard and intervening Allied forces used a small number of tanks, primarily French Renault FTs and British Mk Vs or Whippets. The M1902 gun with its high muzzle velocity was an effective weapon against such targets with only anti-bullet armour protection. In the 1920 Polish-Soviet War M1902 guns were again used against Polish FTs.

=== Austro-Hungarian use ===
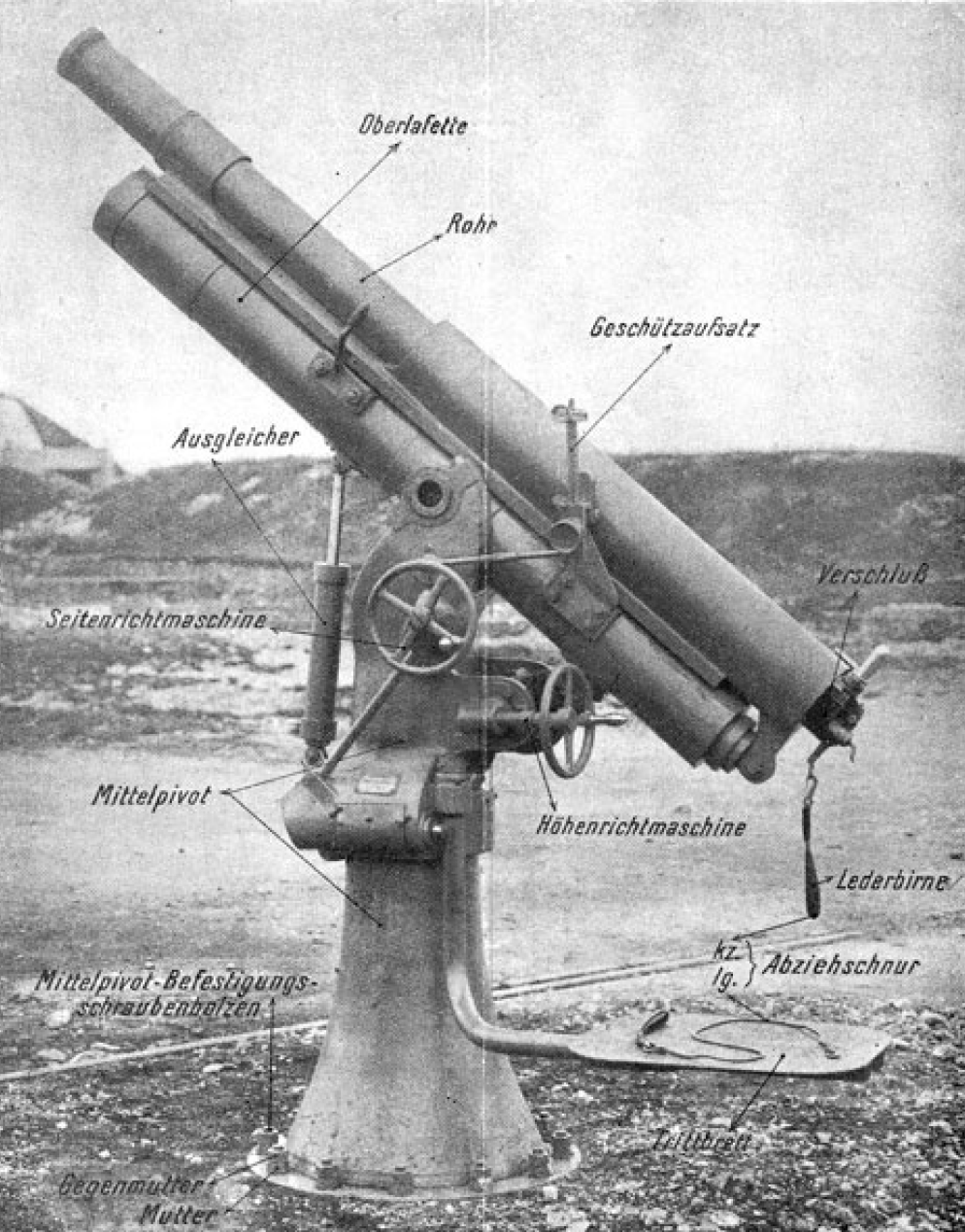
A M1902 barrel and recoil mechanism converted to anti-aircraft use by Austria-Hungary.

Due to a string of Russian defeats during the first two years of World War I large numbers of M1902's and their ammunition ended up in Austro-Hungarian hands. Due to a shortage of anti-aircraft guns some M1902's were converted to anti-aircraft guns by fitting the barrel and recoil mechanism to a fixed high-angle/low-angle pedestal mount. The converted guns were given the Austro-Hungarian designation 8 cm L/30 M. 14 R. Although designated 8 cm the gun was not bored out to use Austro-Hungarian 76.5 mm ammunition and fired captured Russian 76.2 mm ammunition. The 8 cm designation was due to the Austro-Hungarians rounding up to the next highest centimeter in their artillery designations.

=== German use ===
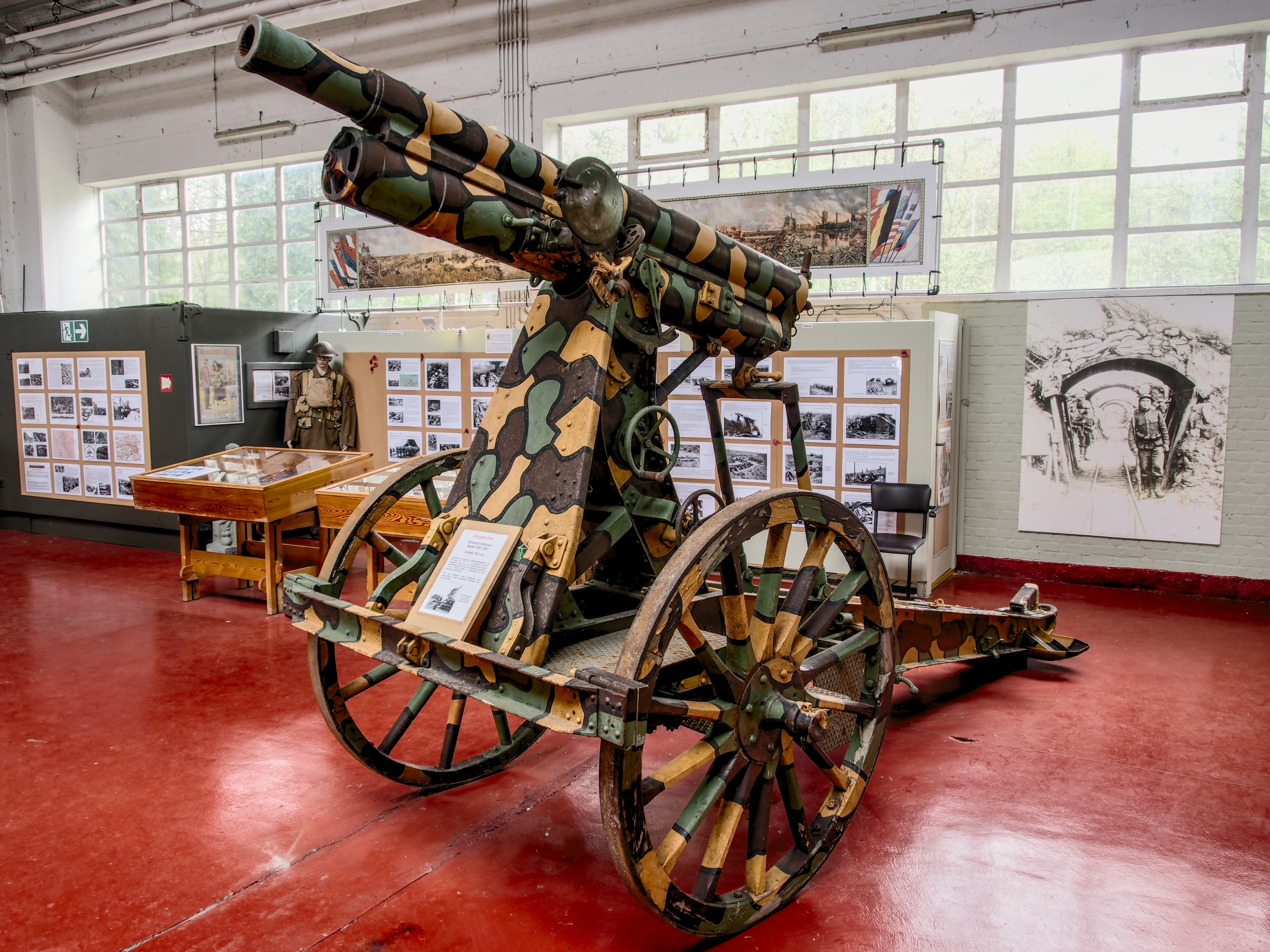
A 7.62 cm FlaK L/30 anti-aircraft gun at the gunfire museum Brasschaat.

Due to a string of Russian defeats during the first two years of World War I large numbers of M1902's and their ammunition ended up in German hands. A combination of factors led the Germans to issue M1902's to their troops as replacements.

These factors included:

- An underestimation of light field artillery losses during the first two years of the war and an inadequate number of replacement guns being produced.
- An underestimation of ammunition consumption, inadequate production and resulting shortages.
- The superior ballistic performance of the M1902 compared to German designs.

Once production of German guns and ammunition caught up during the last two years of the war the M1902's were converted to anti-aircraft guns on a number of different high-angle mounts and these continued in German service until the end of the war with German ammunition.

=== Romanian service ===
Romania had a considerable number of World War I guns of 75 mm and 76.2 mm. Some models were modernized at Resita works in 1935 including M1902. The upgrade was made with removable barrels. Several types of guns of close caliber were barreled to use the best ammunition available for 75 mm caliber which was explosive projectile model 1917 "Schneider". The new barrel was made of steel alloy with chrome and nickel with excellent mechanical resistance to pressure which allowed, after modifying the firing brake, the recovery arch and the sighting devices an increase of the range from 8.5 km to 11.2 km and a rate of fire of 20 rounds/minute. During World War 2 these guns also used Costinescu 75 mm anti-tank round. These upgraded field guns were used in all infantry divisions in World War II.

=== Polish use ===
Poland captured large numbers of M1902 guns in the course of the Polish-Soviet War and pressed them into service as a standard piece of the mounted artillery, designated 76,2 mm armata wz.1902. In 1923, there were 568 guns wz.1902 in inventory. Most were converted to wz.02/26 guns in 1926-1930 (see below), however, Poland also retained some of the guns in the original 76 mm caliber to use existing stocks of ammunition. There were 89 of original guns available at the outbreak of World War II, among others, a single gun was used during the Battle of Westerplatte on 1 September 1939.

== Interwar development ==
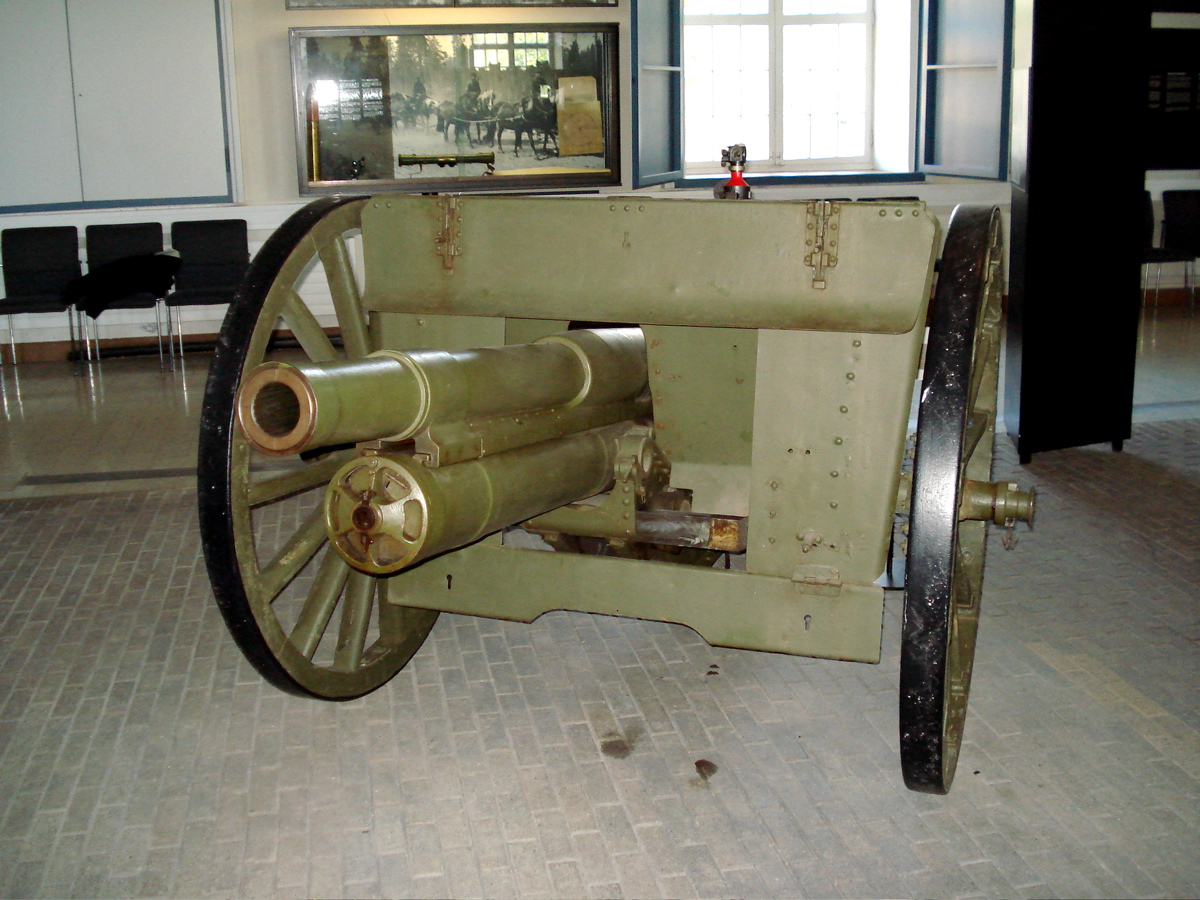

Poland and Soviet Union modernized their M1902 guns after the end of World War I. Polish designers made their minor enhancements in 1926, resulting in the Armata 75 mm wz.02/26 gun, which was rechambered for firing 75 mm shells used by the most numerous Polish field gun, the Canon de 75 modèle 1897. The USSR continued mass production of M1902 gun until 1931 when it was replaced by its enhanced M1902/30 variant. For Soviet modernization see 76 mm divisional gun M1902/30. Both variants were utilized in the early stages of World War II. There were still 2066 guns of M1902 model available in 1941. The Soviet stockpiles of 76 mm ammunition for this gun were so large that the Soviet army decided to retain the 76 mm caliber ammunition for their modern field guns designed in the 1930s (F-22, USV and ZiS-3), even as other armies changed to larger calibers for their basic field gun.

=== Estonian use ===
Estonia used 16 M1902s on eight railway artillery platforms from 1920 to 1934, when the platforms were transferred to the Estonian Armored Train Regiment, in which they served from 1934 to 1941.

== See also ==
=== Weapons of comparable role, performance and era ===
- 7.7 cm FK 96 n.A. German equivalent
- Canon de 75 modèle 1897 French equivalent
- Ordnance BLC 15-pounder British equivalent
- 3-inch M1902 field gun U.S. equivalent
- 10 cm M. 14 Feldhaubitze Austrian equivalent

== Bibliography ==
- Shunkov V. N. - The Weapons of the Red Army, Mn. Harvest, 1999 (Шунков В. Н. - Оружие Красной Армии. - Мн.: Харвест, 1999.) ISBN 985-433-469-4
- Russian Putilov 76.2mm m/02 Field Gun at Landships II
- 76 K/02 at FlamesOfWar
