= Canon de 75 mle GP III =

Canon de 75 Mle GP III
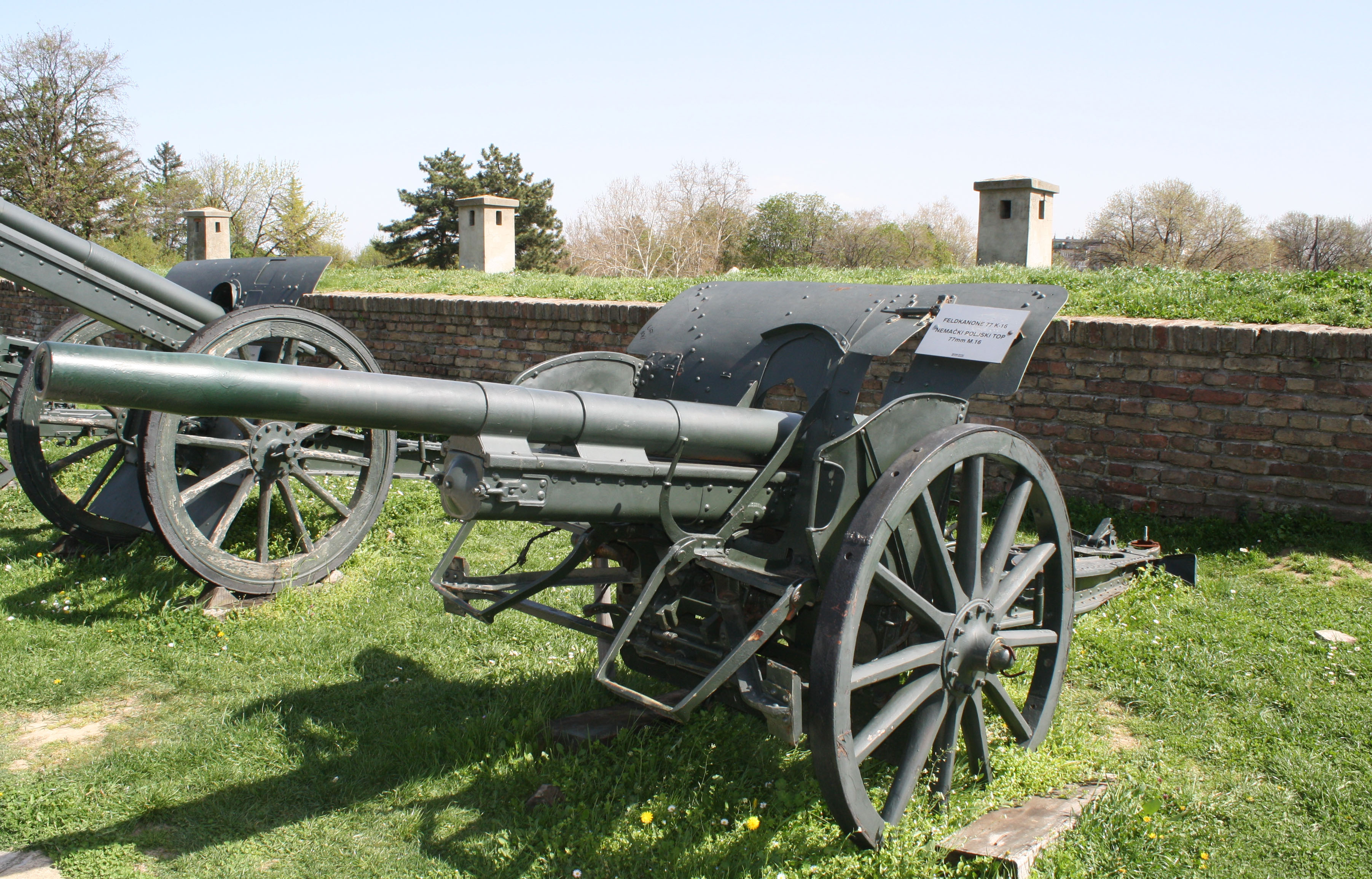
- In Belgrade military museum
- Type: field gun
- Place of origin: Belgium

Service history
- In service: 1919?-1945
- Used by: Belgium; Nazi Germany
- Wars: World War II

Production history
- Designer: Cockerill
- Manufacturer: Cockerill

Specifications
- Mass: 2,337 kg (5,152 lb) (travel); 1,390 kg (3,060 lb) (combat)
- Barrel length: 2.8 metres (9 ft 2 in) L/37.3
- Shell: Fixed QF 75 x 150mm R
- Shell weight: 6.125 kilograms (13.50 lb)
- Caliber: 75 mm (2.95 in)
- Carriage: Box trail
- Elevation: -8° to +35°
- Traverse: 8°
- Muzzle velocity: 579 m/s (1,899 ft/s)
- Maximum firing range: 11 kilometres (6.8 mi)

The Canon de 75 mle GPIII was a field gun used by Belgium during World War II. Cockerill mounted a sleeve in the barrels of ex-German 7.7 cm FK 16 guns received as reparations after World War I to convert them to the standard Belgian 75mm ammunition. After 1940, the Wehrmacht designated captured guns as the 7.5 cm FK 236(b). This gun was nearly the equivalent of the German 7.5 cm FK 16 nA and apparently saw wider service than the other captured Belgian guns.
