= C64 (disambiguation) =

The Commodore 64, commonly known as just C64, is a home computer introduced by Commodore International.

C64 or C-64 may also refer to:

- C64 (field gun), a late 19th-century field gun by Krupp
- C-64 (Michigan county highway), a road in the United States
- C-64 Norseman, an aircraft
- Ruy Lopez's chess opening number in the Encyclopedia of Chess Openings
- Renal cell carcinoma's code in the International Classification of Diseases 10th edition
