= 7.7 cm FK 96 =

Imperial German field gun

7.7 cm Feldkanone 96
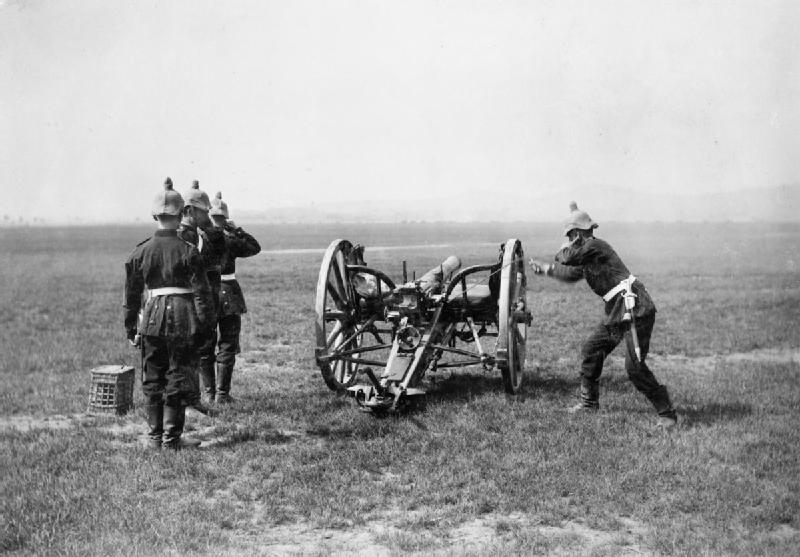
- A FK 96 a.A. during manoeuvres in 1902.
- Type: Field gun
- Place of origin: German Empire

Service history
- In service: 1896
- Used by: German Empire
- Wars: Second Boer War; Herero Wars; World War I

Production history
- Designer: Krupp
- Manufacturer: Krupp
- Variants: 7.7 cm FK 96 n.A.

Specifications
- Mass: 919 kilograms (2,026 lb)
- Barrel length: 2.15 metres (7 ft 1 in)
- Diameter: 77 mm
- Shell: separate-loading, cased charge
- Caliber: 77 mm (3 in)
- Breech: horizontal sliding-block
- Carriage: fixed trail
- Rate of fire: 8 rpm
- Muzzle velocity: 465 m/s (1,525 ft/s)
- Filling: picric acid

The 7.7 cm Feldkanone 96 (7.7 cm FK 96) was a field gun used by Germany before World War I.

== History ==
It was a thoroughly conventional gun, being a modernized version of Krupp's FK 73 gun, but failed to incorporate any recoil system other than a partially effective spade brake, and fired a 12-pound projectile. Thus it was rendered obsolete when the French introduced their Canon de 75 modèle 1897 the following year. Most guns were rebuilt to modern standards (only the barrel was retained) in 1904 as the 7.7 cm FK 96 n.A. (neuer Art) [new model] which served throughout World War I as one of Germany's main light field guns. The remaining unmodified guns were then known as the 7.7 cm FK 96 a.A. (alte Art or old model).

A number of 7.5 cm Krupp L/24 quick firing guns, similar to the 7.7 cm Feldkanone C/96 (FK 96 a/A) guns, were sold to the Boer republic of Transvaal. These guns were used with good effect against the British in the Second Boer War between 1899 and 1902. A number of 7.7 cm FK 96 a/A guns were also used by Schutztruppen batteries during the 1904 Herero Wars and during the South African invasion of German South West Africa, 1914–1915.

== See also ==
- C64 (field gun), roughly its predecessor in the Franco-Prussian and Second Schleswig War.
- 7.7 cm FK 96 n.A. : modernised version

=== Weapons of comparable role, performance and era ===
- Ordnance BL 15 pounder, British equivalent
