= 7.7 cm FK 16 =

WW1 German field gun

7.7 cm Feldkanone 16
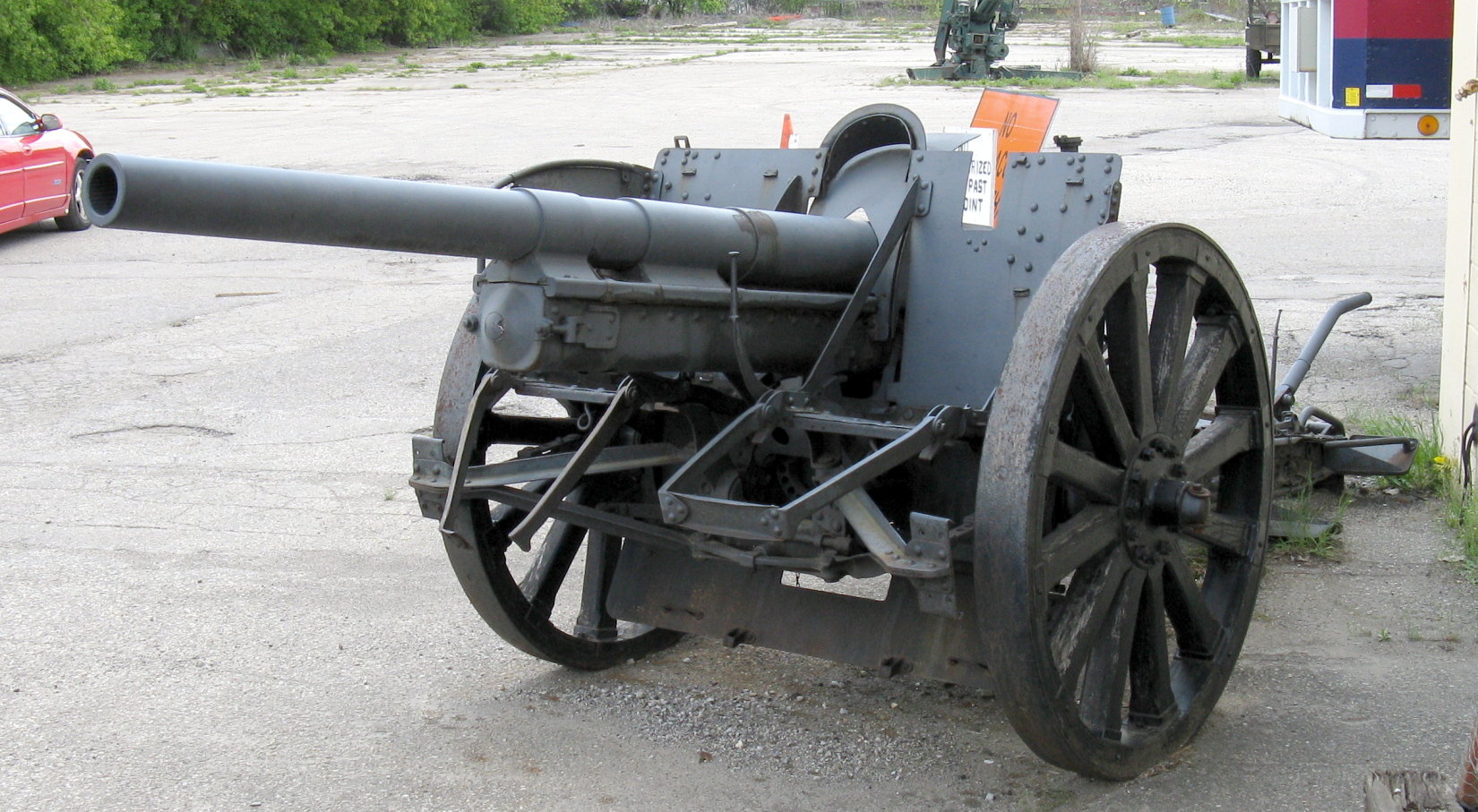
- Type: Field gun
- Place of origin: German Empire

Service history
- In service: 1916–1945
- Used by: German Empire; Bulgaria; China; Finland
- Wars: World War I Spanish Civil War; World War II

Production history
- Designer: Krupp
- Manufacturer: Krupp
- Produced: 1916–1918
- No. built: 3,020+

Specifications
- Mass: 1,318 kg (2,906 lb)
- Barrel length: 2.695 m (8 ft 10 in) L/35
- Shell: Separate loading, cased charge and projectile 77 x 230mm R
- Caliber: 77 millimetres (3.0 in)
- Breech: horizontal sliding-block
- Recoil: hydro-spring
- Carriage: box trail
- Elevation: -10° to +40°
- Traverse: 4°
- Muzzle velocity: 545 m/s (1,790 ft/s)
- Effective firing range: 9,100 m (10,000 yd); 7.2 kg (16 lb)(HE shell)
- Maximum firing range: 10,700 m (11,700 yd) (gas shell)

The 7.7 cm Feldkanone 16 (7.7 cm FK 16) was a field gun used by Germany in World War I. Most surviving examples in German service were rebarreled after the war as the 7.5 cm FK 16 nA (neuer Art, meaning "new model"). A total of 298 guns of the old type were still in German army service in 1939, making it the oldest field artillery piece in German inventory at the beginning of the Second World War.

== History ==
The older 7.7 cm FK 96 n.A. field gun was very mobile, but, once the war settled into trench warfare, its lack of range became a serious disadvantage. The FK 16 was intended to remedy this problem. The barrel was lengthened and it was given a box carriage to allow for greater elevation, which increased the range. It was also given separate-loading ammunition to reduce powder consumption and barrel wear at short ranges, although this had the drawback of reducing the rate of fire compared to the older gun.

It was prematurely rushed into production in 1916 and early guns suffered from a number of defects, mainly stemming from the German use of substitute materials to reduce consumption of strategic metals. It also suffered from a large number of premature detonations of its shells during 1916. These were traced to poor quality control of its shells, which were sometimes too large in diameter, and problems with the picric acid used as high explosive filler in lieu of TNT. The picric acid would form very sensitive picric salts within days of filling the shells and would often detonate from the shock of firing. Lacquering the insides of the shells and spraying them with a turpentine/starch solution neutralized the picric acid and prevented it from forming picric salts.

The barrel of this gun was mounted on the carriage of the 10.5 cm Feldhaubitze 98/09 as the 7.7 cm Kanone in Haubitzelafette (i.e. "cannon on howitzer carriage") to allow it greater elevation and range.

Belgium modified the guns it received as post-war reparations as the Canon de 75 mle GP II and the Canon de 75 mle GP III. After the war, some guns were retained by Germany, re-barreled into 75mm caliber, and used in World War II as the 7.5 cm FK 16 nA.

== Publications ==
- Hogg, Ian. Twentieth-Century Artillery. New York: Barnes & Noble Books, 2000 ISBN 0-7607-1994-2
- Jäger, Herbert. German Artillery of World War One. Ramsbury, Marlborough, Wiltshire: Crowood Press, 2001 ISBN 1-86126-403-8
