= 7.62 cm Infanteriegeschütz L/16.5 =

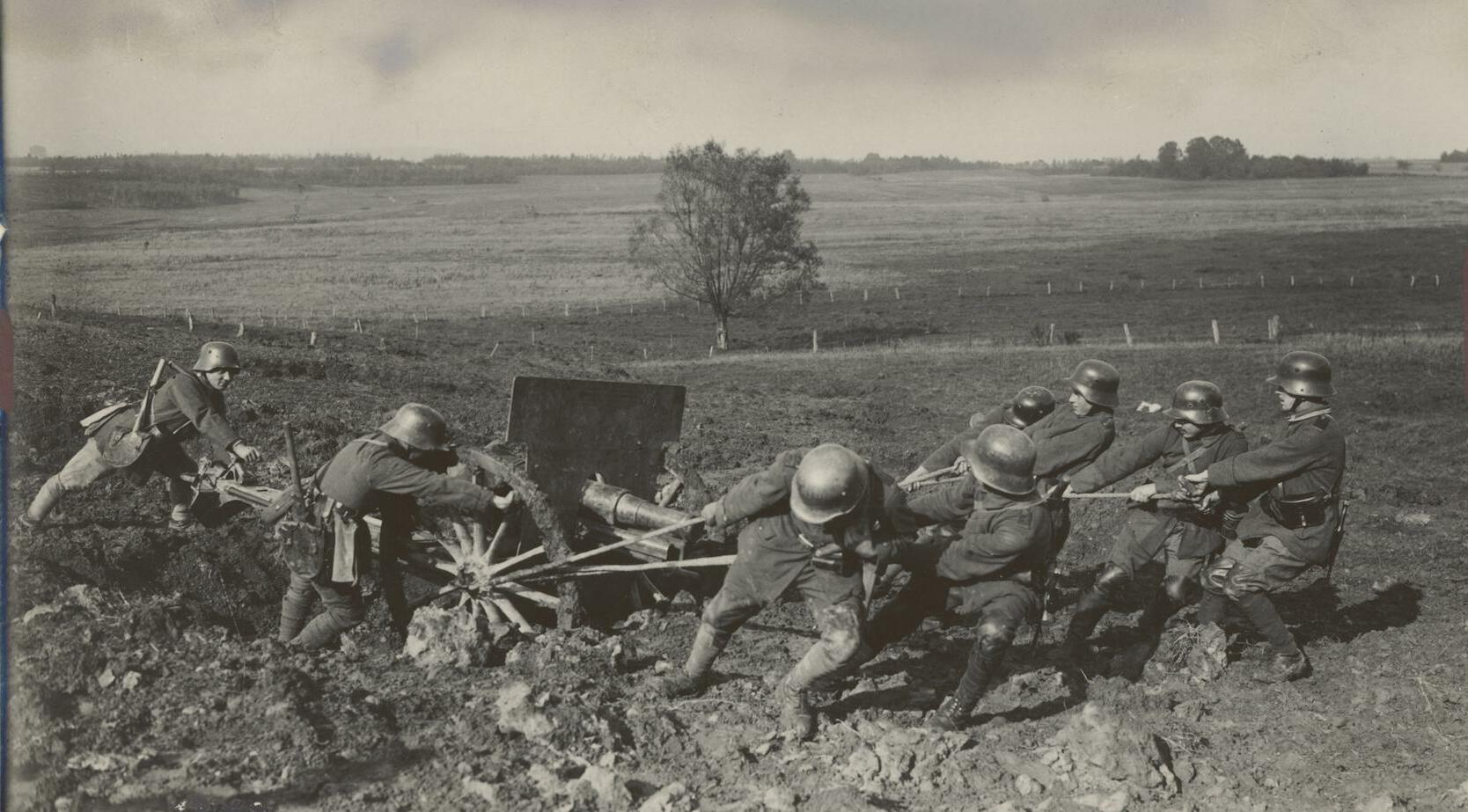
- A 7.62 cm Infanteriegeschütz L/16.5 stuck in the mud.
- Type: Infantry gun
- Place of origin: German Empire

Service history
- In service: 1916–1918
- Used by: German Empire
- Wars: World War I

Production history
- Designer: Krupp
- Manufacturer: Krupp

Specifications
- Mass: 608 kg (1,340 lb)
- Length: 2.31 m (7 ft 7 in)
- Barrel length: 1.257 m (4.1 ft) L/16.5
- Width: 1.15 m (3 ft 9 in)
- Height: 94 cm (3 ft 1 in)
- Shell: 6 kg (13 lb 4 oz)
- Caliber: 76.2 mm (3 in)
- Breech: Interrupted screw
- Carriage: Box trail
- Elevation: -18.6° to +11.5°
- Traverse: 9.5°
- Muzzle velocity: 295 m/s (968 ft/s)
- Effective firing range: 600 m (660 yd) (Canister)
- Maximum firing range: 4,000 m (4,400 yd) (HE shell)

The 7.62 cm Infanteriegeschütz L/16.5 was an infantry gun used by Germany in World War I.

German field guns had proven too heavy to accompany the infantry in the assault and the Germans resorted to a variety of solutions in an effort to find something that could help the infantry deal with bunkers and other obstacles. Enormous numbers of Russian 7.62 cm Model 1910 Putilov fortress guns had been captured early in the war and Krupp was told to adapt them for use as infantry guns. They mounted the barrel and breech of the Russian guns on a new solid box-trail carriage with two narrow seats behind the gun shield, facing to the rear. The gun retained its extraordinary depression of -18.6°, which was a legacy of its original purpose to fire down into fortress ditches, although its limited elevation prevented it from ranging past 2.7 kilometres (3,000 yd) without digging in the trail. It used captured Russian canister ammunition for short-range engagements, but Rheinmetall manufactured its HE shell.

It proved to be popular with its crews, who appreciated its light weight, accuracy and good effect of the shell. However, the gun wore out quickly due to the poor-quality steel used by the Russians, and this degraded its accuracy significantly. In his desire to save weight, Krupp had lightened the carriage a bit too much and it proved to be rather fragile in normal use. The 7.7 cm Infanteriegeschütz L/20 was intended to rectify its shortcomings, but it remained in use for the remainder of the war.

== Gallery ==
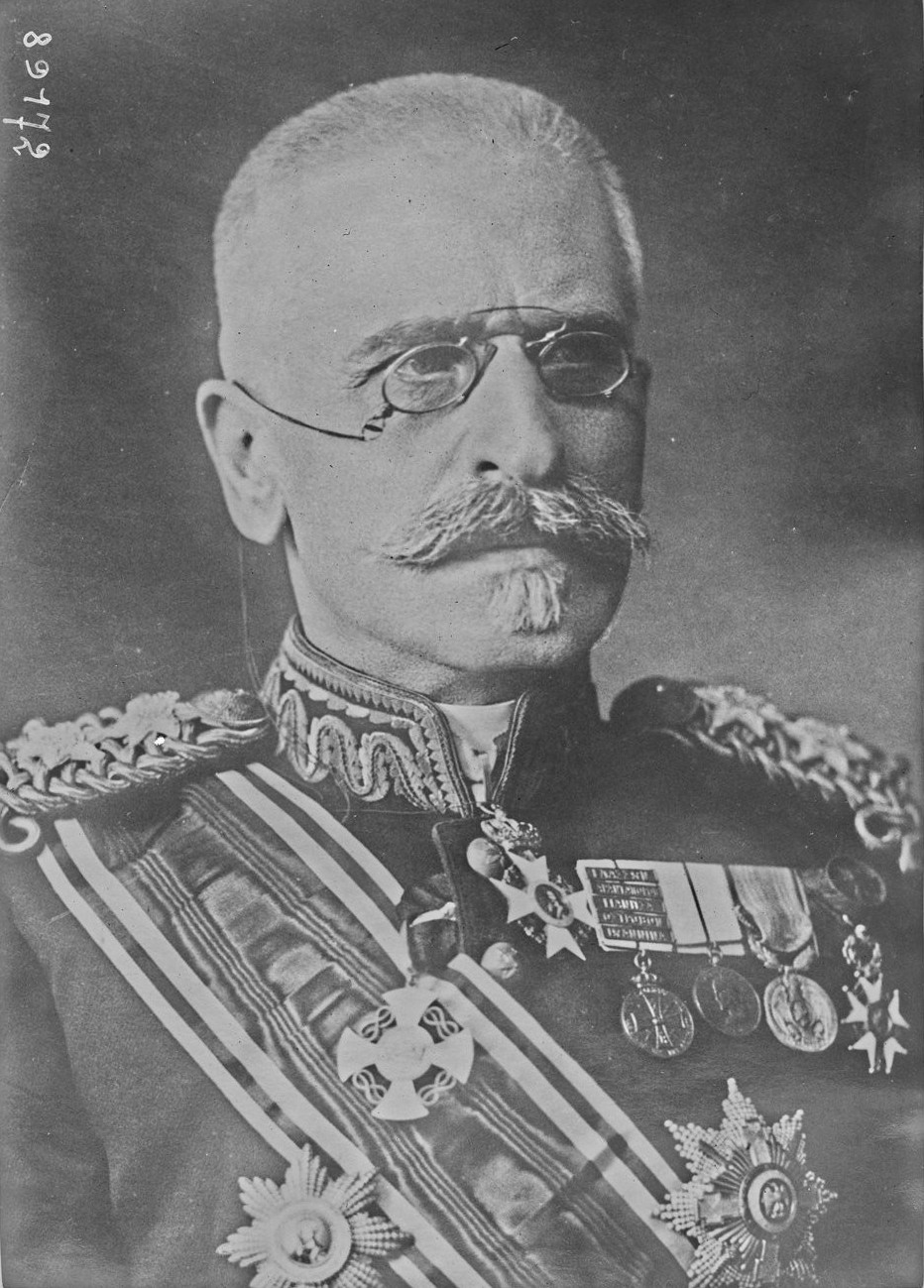
Greek general and politician Panagiotis Danglis designer of the M1909 mountain gun the predecessor of the M1910 fortress gun

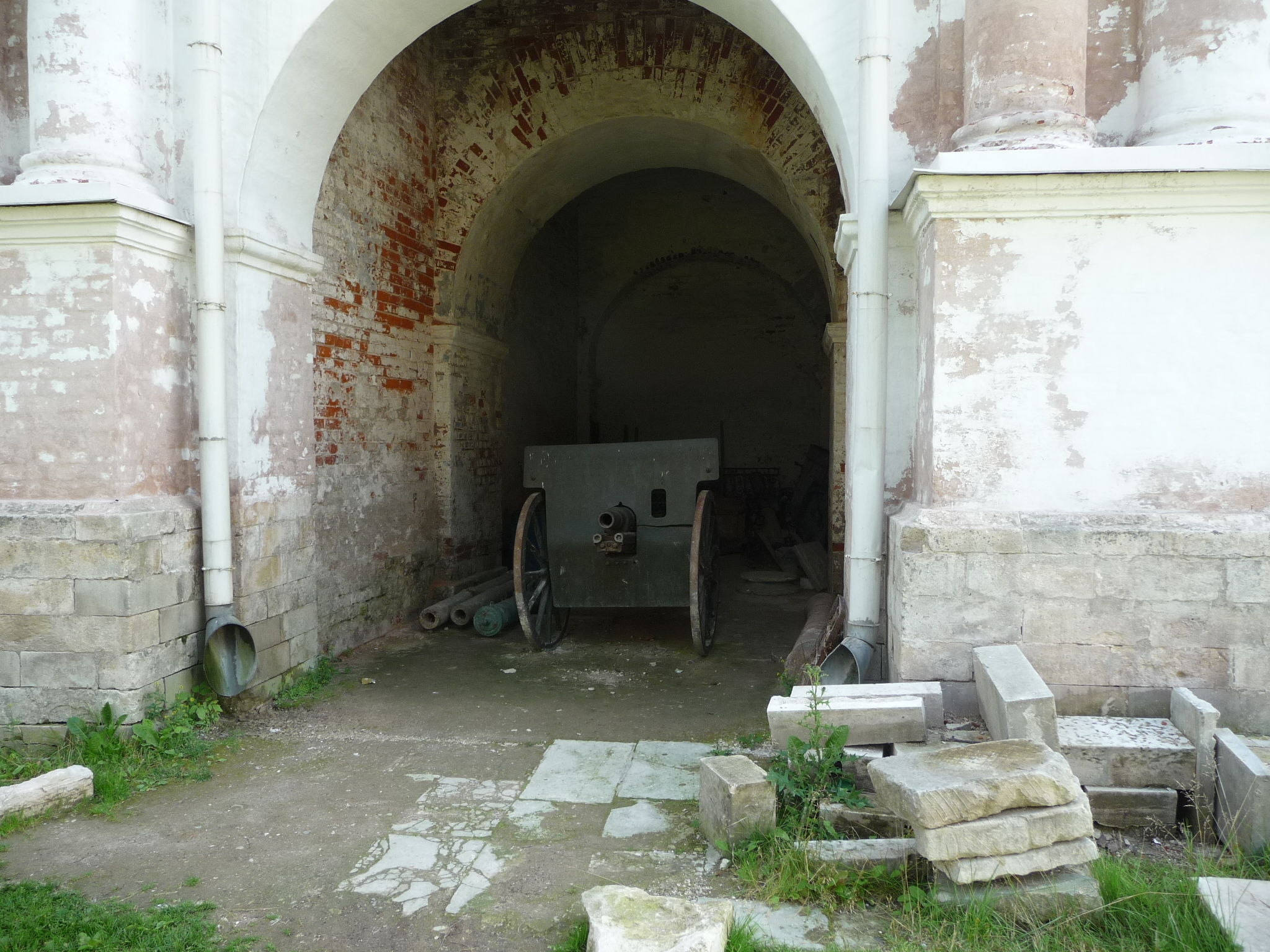
A 76 mm counter-assault gun M1910 at the Novodevichy Convent in Moscow Russia

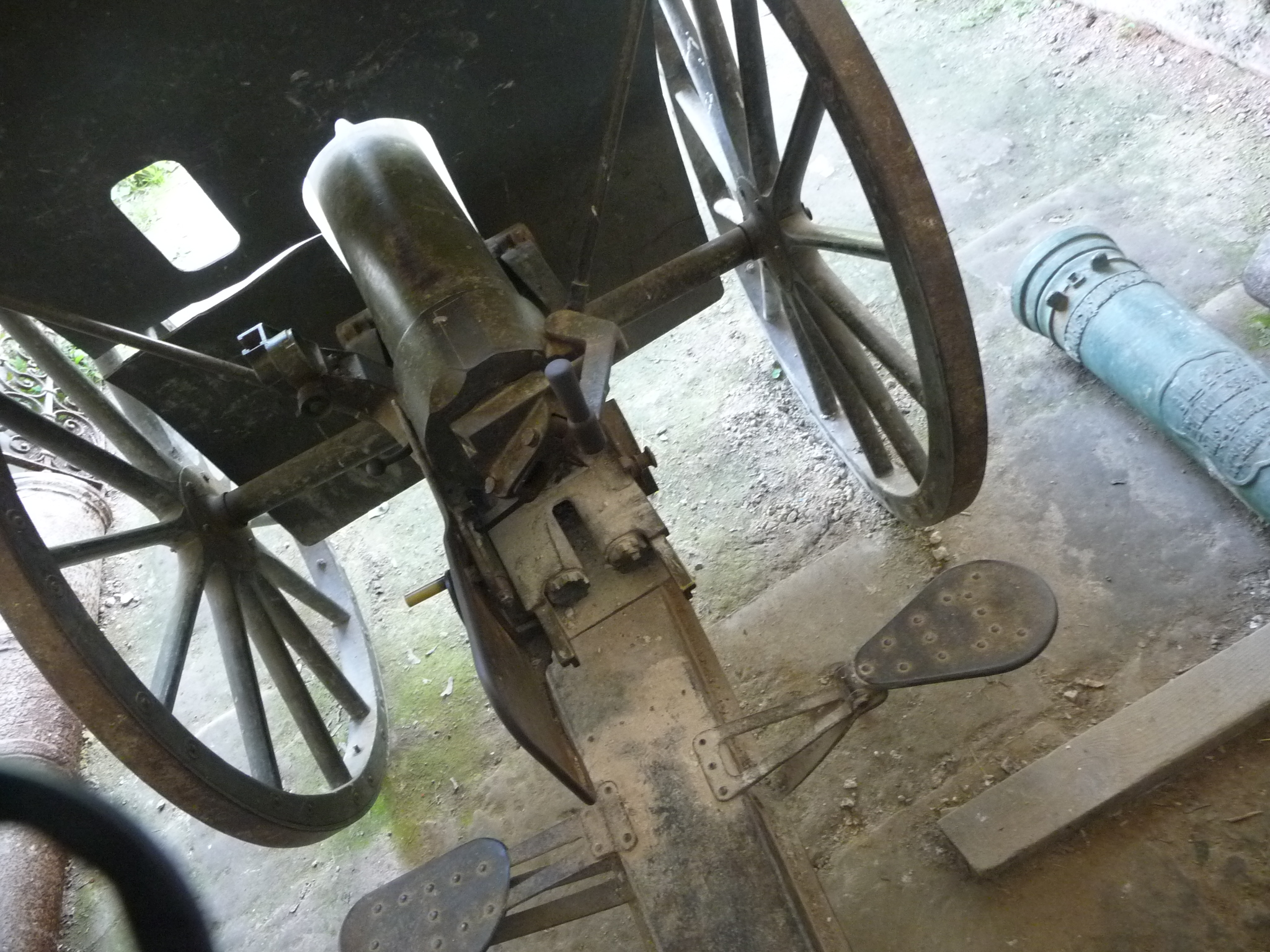
A 76 mm counter-assault gun M1910 with lightly built carriage

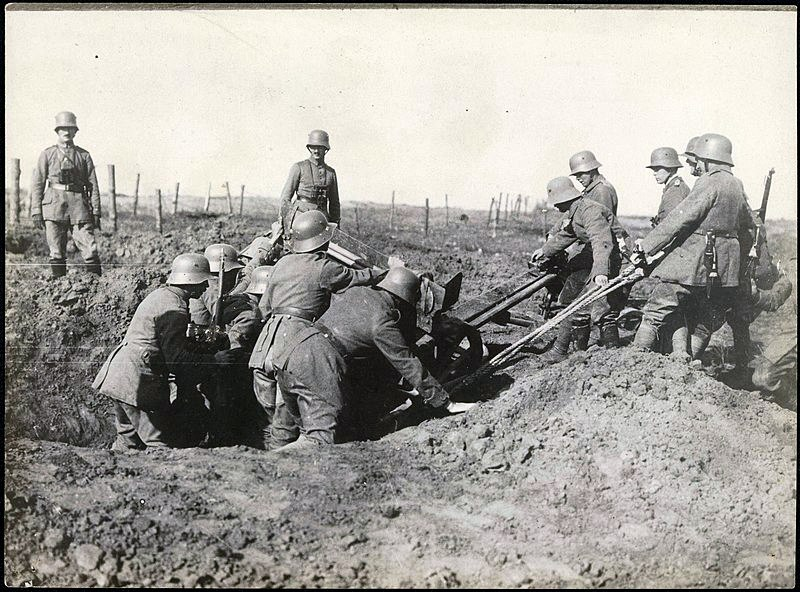
A 7.62 cm Infanteriegeschütz L/16.5 in German service.
