= 7.7 cm Infanteriegeschütz L/27 =

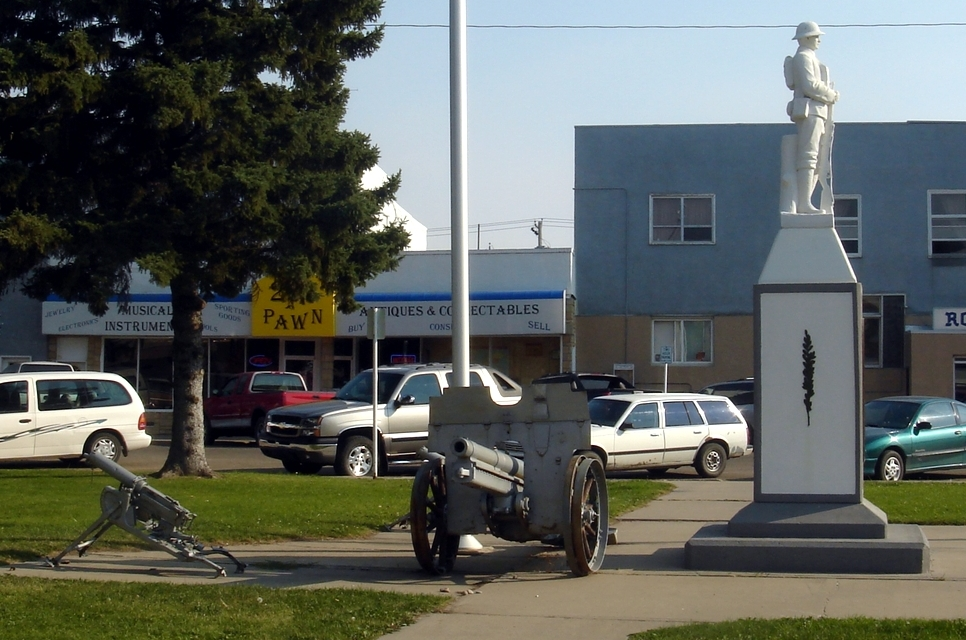
- A 7.7 cm Infanteriegeschütze L/27 at the Taber Alberta War Memorial. Notice the lack of seats, small diameter wheels, no lower shield, and shield extended over the wheels.
- Type: Infantry gun
- Place of origin: German Empire

Service history
- In service: 1917–1918
- Used by: German Empire
- Wars: World War I

Production history
- Designer: Krupp
- Manufacturer: Krupp

Specifications
- Mass: 845 kg (1,863 lb)
- Barrel length: 2.08 m (6 ft 10 in) L/27
- Shell: 6.85 kg (15 lb 2 oz)
- Caliber: 77 mm (3.03 in)
- Breech: Horizontal sliding-wedge
- Carriage: Box trail
- Elevation: -15° to +12°
- Traverse: 6°
- Muzzle velocity: approx 400 m/s (1,312 ft/s)
- Effective firing range: 4,600 m (5,000 yd)
- Maximum firing range: 7,800 m (8,500 yd) (trail dug in)

The 7.7 cm Infanteriegeschütz L/27 was an infantry gun used by Germany in World War I. It was intended to replace the 7.7 cm Infanteriegeschütz L/20, but only saw limited service.

It was another variant of the 7.7 cm FK 96 n.A. using the tube, breech and carriage of the older gun. The carriage was modified with smaller diameter and narrower wheels set closer together, lacking the axle mounted crew seats and lower part of the shield. In other design departures from the standard gun, the shield was detachable and the axle was set further to the rear, altering the balance of the gun for easier manual handling. A removeable drum shaped counterweight was placed in a cradle over the trail spade to compensate for this change in balance for firing. Unlike the standard gun, the barrel could be quickly removed from the recoil cradle without having to unscrew and remove the recoil buffer and springs. On difficult terrain that may be expected in the front lines, it could be transported in two loads if required. Some surviving examples feature bolted-on wide steel tires to reduce the wheel pressure on soft ground.

Only enough guns for eighteen batteries had been ordered and delivered in the Spring of 1917 as the Germans continued their search for the ideal infantry gun by ordering the Austrian Skoda 7.5 cm Gebirgskanone 15.

There are six known surviving examples - two in Canada, two in the USA, one in Australia and one in New Zealand.

== Gallery ==
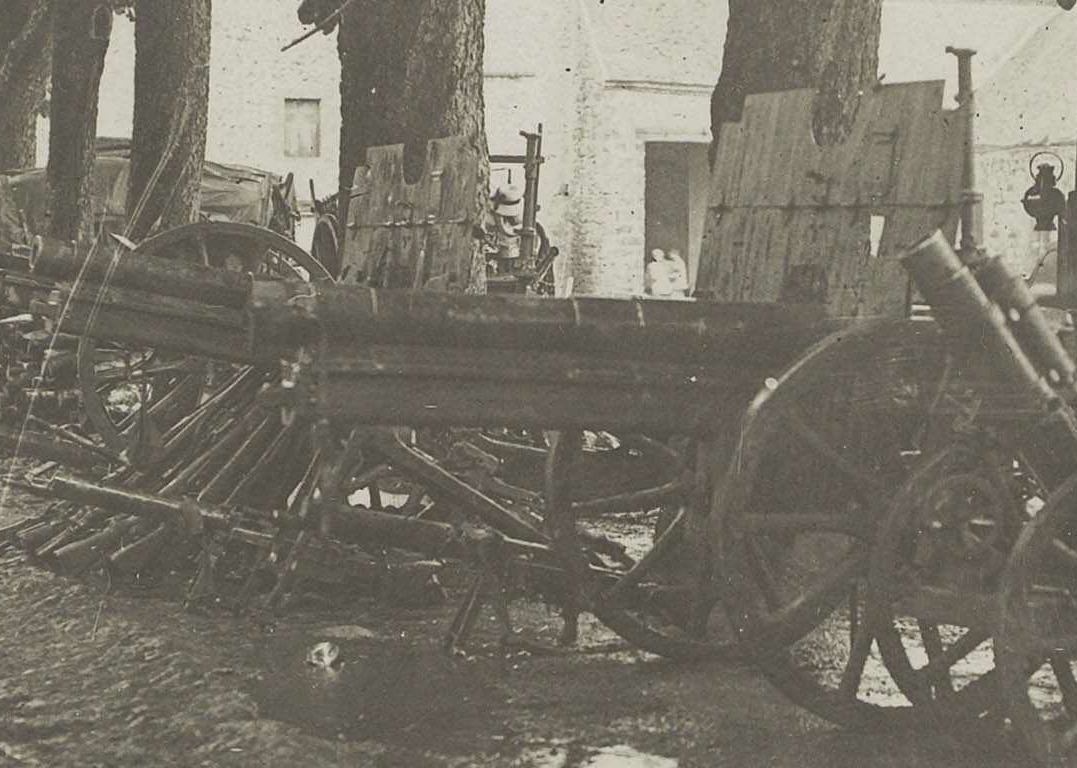
Two guns captured near the Marne in 1918

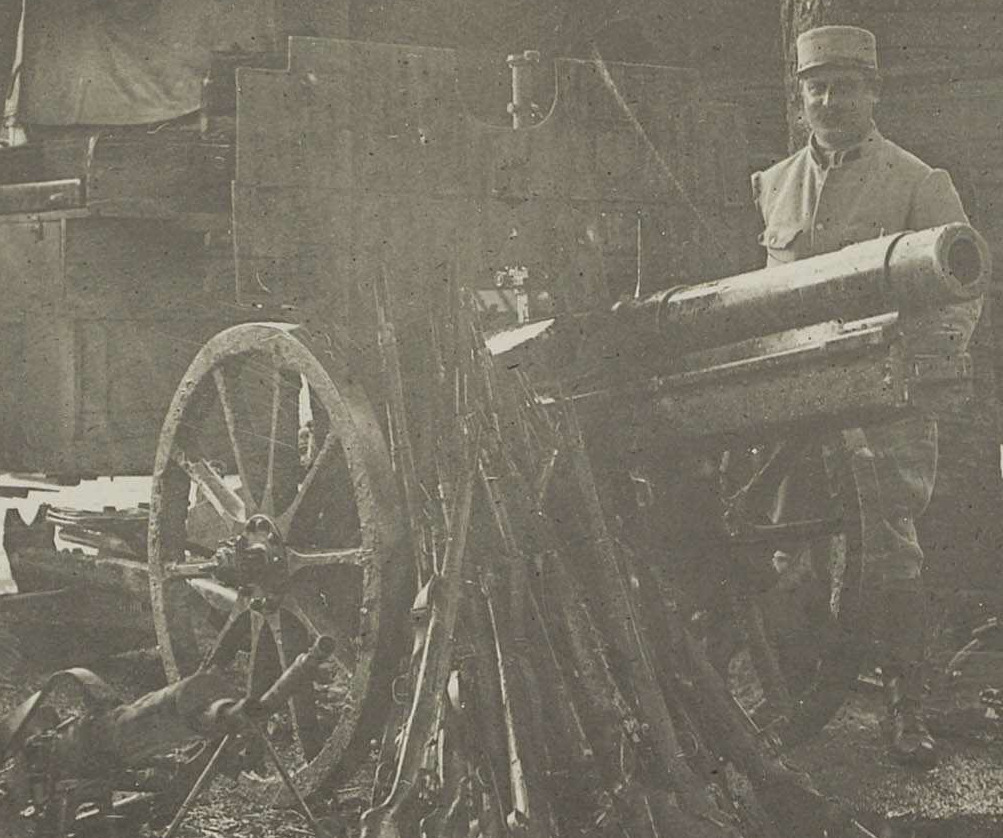
A captured gun
