= 7.7 cm Kanone in Haubitzelafette =

7.7 cm Kanone in Haubitzlafette
- Type: Field gun
- Place of origin: German Empire

Service history
- Used by: German Empire
- Wars: World War I

Production history
- Designer: Rheinmetall
- Manufacturer: Rheinmetall
- Produced: 1915

Specifications
- Mass: Travel: 2,250 kg (4,960 lb); Combat: 1,300 kg (2,900 lb)
- Barrel length: 2.080 m (6 ft 10 in) L/27
- Shell: Separate loading, cased charges and projectile
- Shell weight: 7.2 kg (15 lb 14 oz)
- Caliber: 77 mm (3 in)
- Breech: Horizontal sliding-block
- Recoil: Hydro-spring
- Carriage: Box trail
- Elevation: -10° to +40°
- Rate of fire: 10 rpm
- Muzzle velocity: Charge 1: 420 m/s (1,400 ft/s); Charge 2: 545 m/s (1,790 ft/s)
- Maximum firing range: 10.7 km (6.6 mi)

The 7.7 cm Kanone in Haubitzlafette (7.7 cm gun on howitzer carriage) was a field gun used by Germany in World War I. It consisted of the barrel of the 7.7 cm FK 96 n.A. mounted on the carriage of the 10.5 cm Feldhaubitze 98/09 in an attempt to get more elevation and range than the old 7.7 cm FK 96 n.A.. The Allies captured one example on 17 April 1916, but it is uncertain just how many were made or if they remained in service once the 7.7 cm FK 16 was introduced. The problem of range was addressed in the 7.7 cm FK 16 by adopting a longer barrel, increasing the size of the propellant chamber, changing the rifling pattern and increasing the elevation of the carriage.
