= 7.7 cm Infanteriegeschütz L/20 =

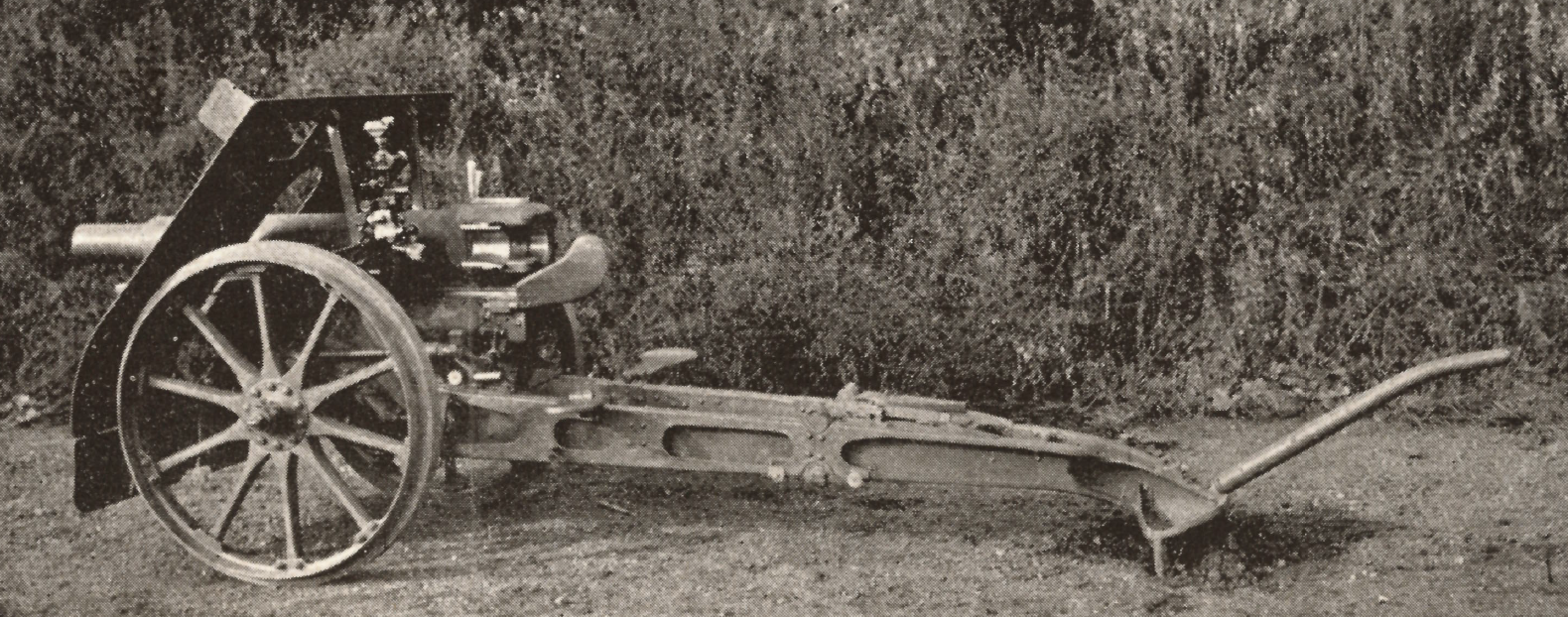
- Type: Infantry gun
- Place of origin: German Empire

Service history
- In service: 1916–1918
- Used by: German Empire
- Wars: World War I

Production history
- Designer: Krupp
- Manufacturer: Krupp

Specifications
- Mass: 815 kg (1,797 lb)
- Barrel length: 1.54 m (5 ft 1 in) L/20
- Shell: 6.85 kg (15 lb 2 oz)
- Caliber: 77 mm (3.03 in)
- Breech: Horizontal sliding-wedge
- Recoil: Hydro-pneumatic
- Carriage: Box trail
- Elevation: -7° to +30°
- Traverse: 5.5°
- Muzzle velocity: approx. 400 m/s (1,312 ft/s)
- Maximum firing range: 5,000 m (5,500 yd) (HE shell)

The 7.7 cm Infanteriegeschütz L/20 was an infantry gun used by Germany in World War I. It was designed by Krupp to rectify the shortcomings of the 7.62 cm Infanteriegeschütz L/16.5.

Krupp mounted a shortened 7.7 cm Feldkanone 96 n.A on one of their mountain howitzer carriages. The German Army required a gun that could be towed cross-country by its crew or broken down into as few as two or as many as eight loads. It fired the full range of ammunition of the FK 96 n.A., but generally only with a reduced charge, although it retained the capacity to fire the old full-power charges that gave a maximum muzzle velocity of 435 m/s (1427 ft/s). It also used a new full-power anti-tank round.

While generally liked by the troops, it was thought to be too heavy and slow to break down and reassemble limiting its usefulness in a war of movement. The German search for a better infantry gun that maximized the use of existing components continued with Krupp's 7.7 cm Infanteriegeschütz L/27.
