= 7.7 cm FK 96 n.A. =

WW1 German field gun

7.7 cm Feldkanone 96 neuer Art
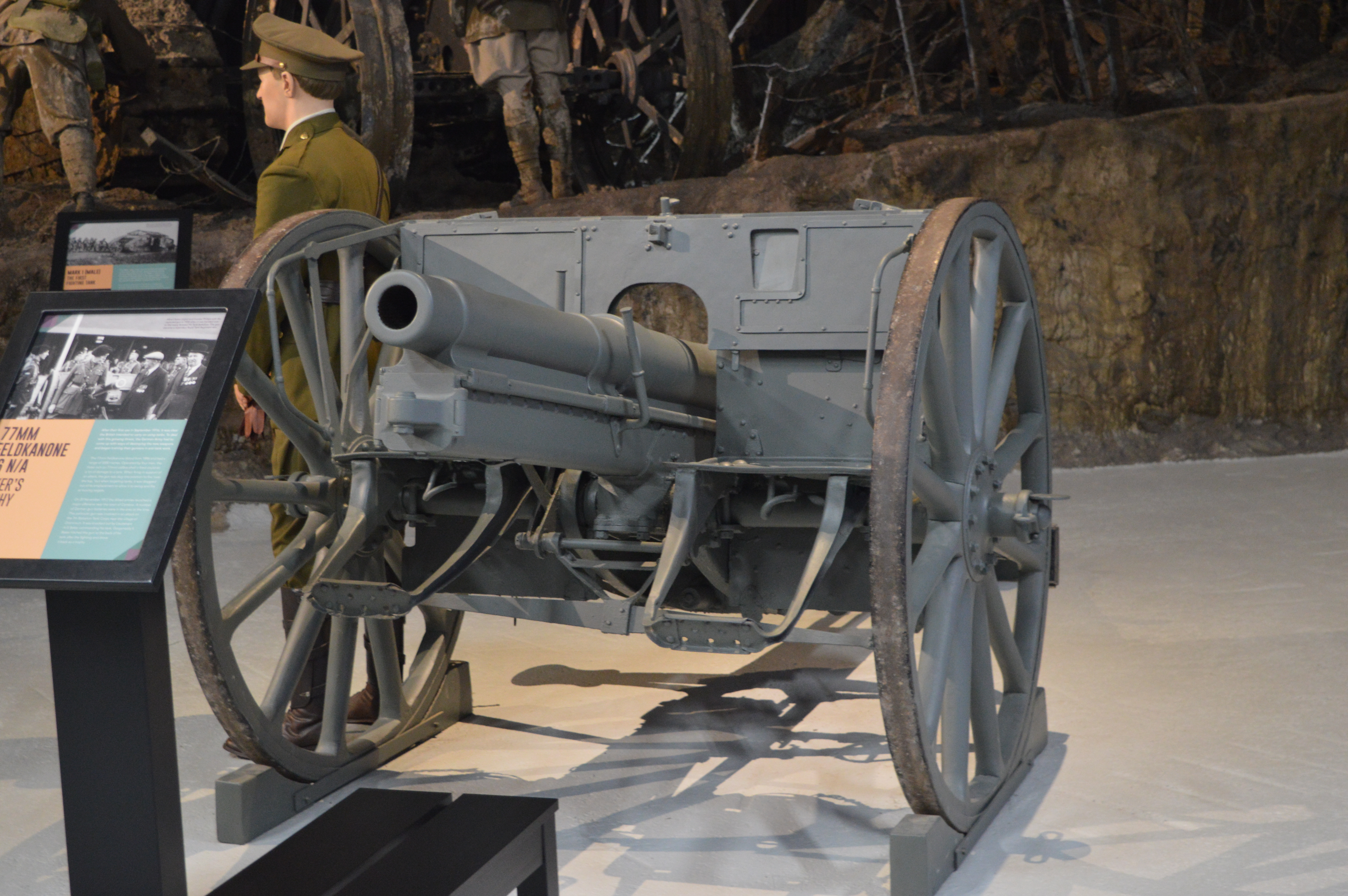
- 7.7 cm FK 96 n.A. at The Tank Museum Bovington
- Type: Field gun
- Place of origin: German Empire

Service history
- In service: 1905
- Used by: See users
- Wars: World War I

Production history
- Designed: 1904
- Produced: 1905
- No. built: 5,086

Specifications
- Mass: 1,020 kg (2,250 lb)
- Barrel length: 2.080 m (6 ft 10 in) L/27
- Width: 1.53 m (5 ft)
- Crew: 5
- Shell: 77 x 234 mm R or 77 x 227 mm R
- Shell weight: 6.8 kilograms (15 lb)
- Caliber: 77 mm (3 in)
- Breech: horizontal sliding-wedge
- Recoil: hydro-spring
- Carriage: Pole trail
- Elevation: -12° 56' to +15° 8'
- Traverse: 7° 15'
- Rate of fire: 10 rpm
- Muzzle velocity: 465 m/s (1,530 ft/s)
- Effective firing range: 5,500 m (6,000 yd)
- Maximum firing range: 8,400 m (9,200 yd) with trail dug in

The 7.7 cm Feldkanone 96 neuer Art (7.7 cm FK 96 n.A.) was a field gun used by Germany in World War I.

== Description ==
The gun combined the barrel of the earlier 7.7 cm FK 96 with a recoil system, a new breech and a new carriage. Existing FK 96s were upgraded over time. The FK 96 n.A. was shorter-ranged, but lighter than the French Canon de 75 modèle 1897 or the British Ordnance QF 18 pounder gun; the Germans placed a premium on mobility, which served them well during the early stages of World War I. However, once the front had become static, the greater rate of fire of the French gun and the heavier shells fired by the British gun put the Germans at a disadvantage. The Germans remedied this by developing the longer-ranged, but heavier 7.7 cm FK 16.

As with most guns of its era, the FK 96 n.A. had seats for two crewmen mounted on its splinter shield. Guns taken into service by Finland, Poland, Lithuania, Estonia and Latvia upon independence in 1919 served until replaced during the 1930s.

== Variants ==
- 7.7 cm Kanone in Haubitzenlafette (KiH) - or Cannon in Howitzer Carriage in English. Mounted the barrel of the FK 96 n.A. on the carriage of the 10.5 cm Feldhaubitze 98/09 in an attempt to get more elevation and range.
- 7.7 cm Nahkampfkanone - or Close Support Cannon in English. Was a FK 96 n.A. with smaller diameter wheels, no bottom shield, and no footrests for the crew seats on the front of the shield. It was an attempt to make a lighter and lower profile gun for close support.
- 7.7 cm Infanteriegeschütze L/20 - or Infantry Gun L/20 in English. Was a shortened FK 96 n.A. barrel mounted on a mountain gun carriage to create a light close support gun that could be disassembled for transport.
- 7.7 cm Infanteriegeschütze L/27 - or Infantry Gun L/27 in English. Was a FK 96 n.A. with smaller diameter wheels, and no crew seats. It had a new shield that extended over the wheels of the carriage. It was an attempt to make a lighter and lower profile gun for close support.
- QF 77 mm Mk I - was the British designation for a converted FK 96 n.A. barrel and recoil mechanism mounted on a HA/LA mount to arm merchant ships, Q ships, and small warships.

== Ammunition ==
- Feldgranate 96: a 6.8 kilogram (15 lb) high-explosive shell filled with .19 kg (0.45 lbs) of TNT.
- FeldkanoneGeschoss 11: A 6.85 kilogram (15.1 lb) shell combining high explosive and shrapnel functions. It contained 294 10 gram lead bullets and .25 kilograms (0.55 lb) of TNT.
- A 6.8 kilogram (15 lb) pure shrapnel shell filled with 300 lead bullets.
- An anti-tank shell
- A smoke shell
- A star shell
- A gas shell

It mainly used the K.Z. 11 time fuse or the later L.K.Z. 16 contact fuse. Because they exploded without delay, shells with contact fuses were called "whizzbangs".

== Users ==
- Kingdom of Bulgaria
- Estonia
- Finland
- German Empire
- Latvia
- Lithuania
- Poland
- Ottoman Empire

== Gallery ==
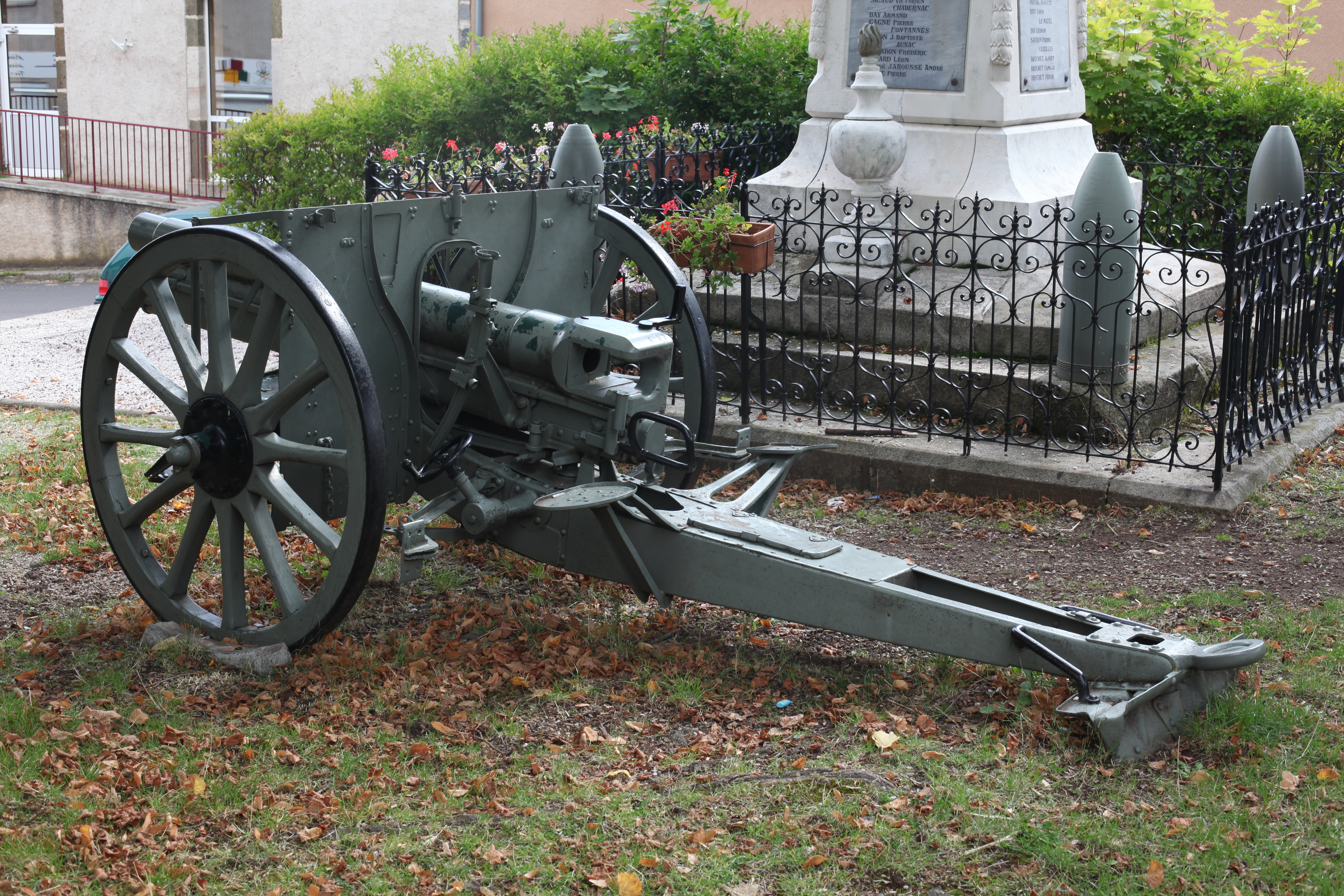
The rear of a 7.7 cm FK 96 n.A.

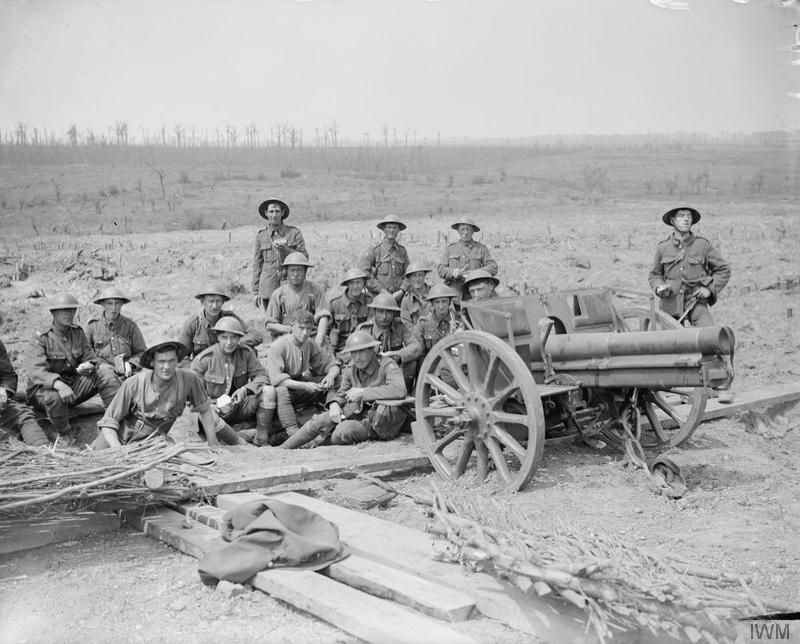
A 7.7 cm Nahkampfkanone captured during the Battle of Messines.

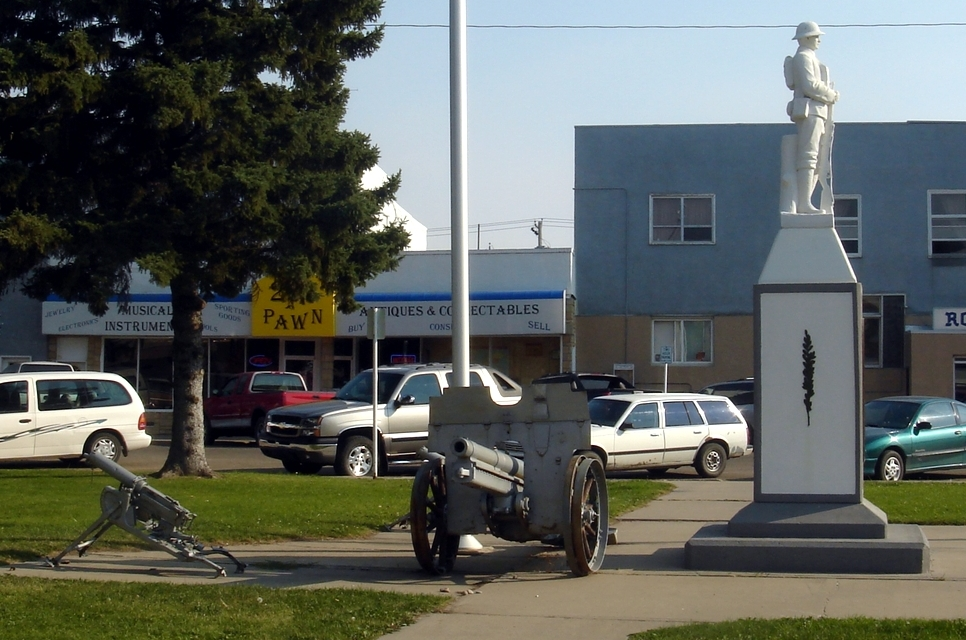
A 7.7 cm Infanteriegeschütze L/27 at the Taber Alberta War Memorial.

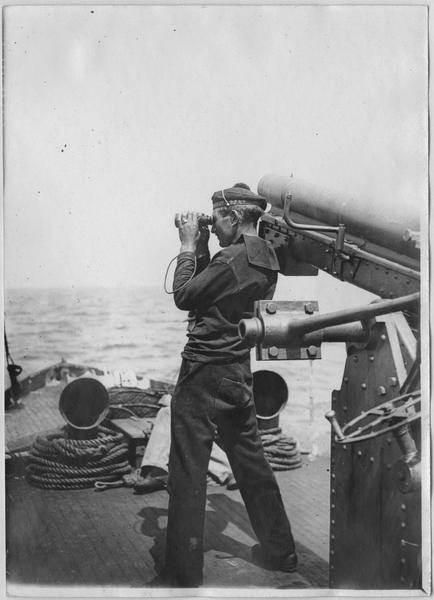
A QF 77 mm Mk I on board a Torpedo boat.

A FK 96 n.A. used as a makeshift anti-aircraft gun.

== Surviving example ==
A restored example of a FK 96 n.A. captured at the Battle of Hamel by Australian forces has been restored and is on display at the Australian Armour & Artillery Museum. India A cannon in front of Hotel Ananda - In the Himalayas, Narendra Nagar, Uttarakhand WTK20150913-IMG 2660.jpg

An additional example is on display in Queens Park, Brisbane, Australia

== See also ==
- 7.7 cm FK 96 : predecessor forming basis of this weapon

=== Weapons of comparable role, performance and era ===
- Ordnance BLC 15 pounder : British equivalent : similar upgrade of an older gun
- 3-inch M1902 field gun : US equivalent
- 10 cm M. 14 Feldhaubitze: Austrian equivalent
