= C64 (field gun) =

Prussian field gun

4-Pfünder-Feldkanone C/64 8 cm Stahlkanone C/64
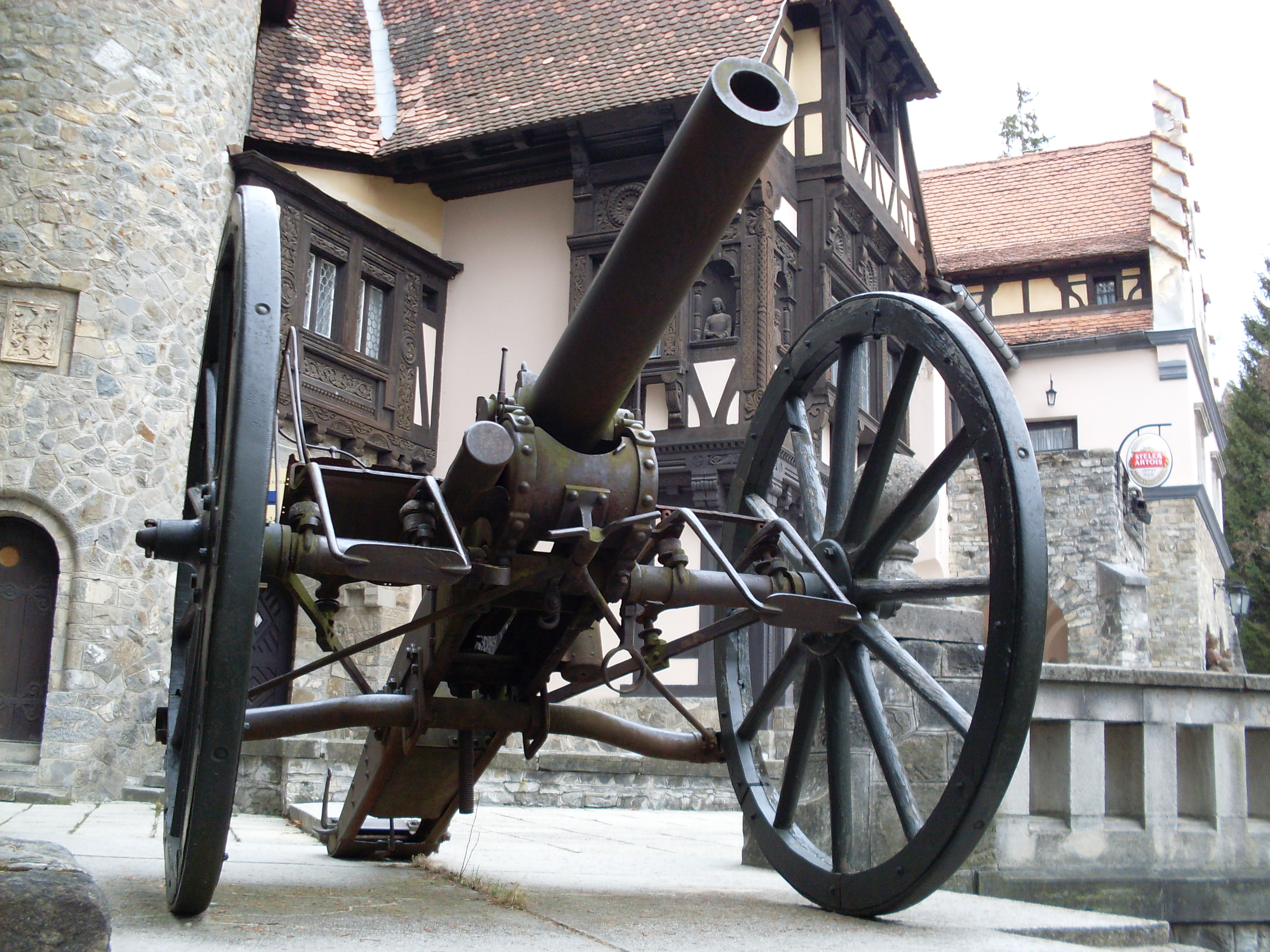
- A C/64 gun on display at Peleș Castle
- Type: Field gun
- Place of origin: Prussia

Service history
- In service: Austro-Prussian War; Franco-Prussian War; Russo-Turkish War (1877–1878); World War I
- Used by: See users

Production history
- Designer: Krupp
- Manufacturer: Krupp
- Variants: C/64/67 (Prussian); Model 1868, model 1871 (Romanian)

Specifications
- Mass: Firing: 650 kg (1,430 lb)–750 kg (1,650 lb); Travel: 1,960 kg (4,320 lb)
- Barrel length: 1.93 m (6 ft 4 in)
- Shell: Shell, shrapnel, canister
- Shell weight: 4.342 kg (9.57 lb) (shell); 4.6 kg (10 lb) (shrapnel); 3.5 kg (7.7 lb) (canister)
- Caliber: 78.5 mm (3 in) L/25
- Breech: Double wedge lock
- Elevation: -8° to +13°
- Muzzle velocity: 357 m/s (1,170 ft/s)
- Maximum firing range: 3.5 km (2.2 mi)

The Krupp C64 (sometimes C/64) steel, breech loaded field gun was one of the main artillery pieces of the Prussians in the 1870–1871 war with France. It was superior to the French counterparts in every way: accuracy, rate of fire, range and reliability of the fuse. The guns were, however, unpopular with artillery specialists of the day as the difficulty in cooling the steel barrel during the casting process could cause flaws which would lead to the barrel shattering when the weapon was fired.

The obturation, a big problem in earlier Krupp rifled breech loaders, was ensured by Broadwell ring design borrowed from American engineer Lewis Wells Broadwell.

== Development ==
With the introduction of the 6-pounder C/61 in 1859, it was examined if a 4-pounder cannon should be developed. In 1860, the Artillery Testing Commission (Artillerieprüfungskommission) decided to apply for the production of a rifled 4-pounder. Although no agreement was reached on the design of the cannon, two test barrels were ordered from the Krupp company in Essen. These were produced in the workshops from Spandau and were delivered in March 1861, with tests beginning in May. The first experimental gun was presented on 1 September 1861.

== Service history ==
=== Service with Prussia ===
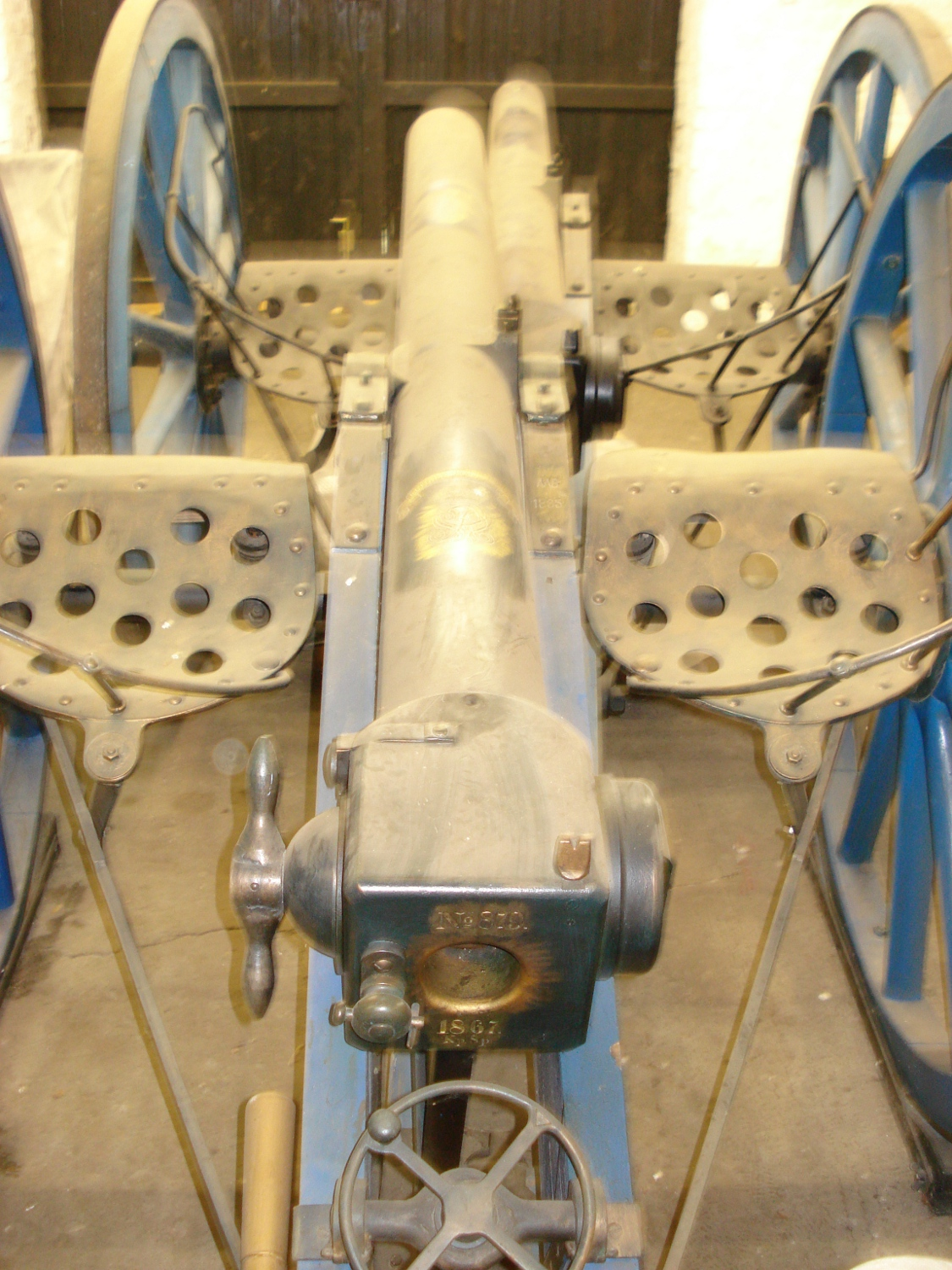
View of the breech of a C/64/67 gun

Based on the reports received from the tests, the Prussian Ministry of War issued a directive in January 1862 that four cannons should be sent for further testing with each artillery regiment. The tests began in July 1862, and by 1863 it was decided to produce the rifled 4-pounder cannon for inspection by the King on 1 April 1864. Meanwhile, a battery of eight experimental guns was formed and successfully participated in the German-Danish War. With the favorable reports and the approval from the King, the C64 gun began introduction to the troops in 1865.

In the Austro-Prussian War, it was noticed that some C64 guns failed without any detectable material defect. Due to this mistrust of the cast steel barrels, the General Inspectorate of Artillery decided to order the production of bronze cannon barrels instead, while an investigation was ongoing. Regardless, it was decided to replace the smoothbore 12-pounders of the horse artillery sections with the C64 steel guns as well, and by 1867, the conversion was completed. After the investigation was finished, it was discovered that the problem was not with the steel construction, but with the design of the breech. After redesigning, the problem was fixed and the new guns were adopted as the C/67, or C/64/67.

During the Franco-Prussian War, there were 11 Prussian artillery regiments, each with one horse, one reserve and three foot units. Each horse artillery unit comprised three batteries, each battery was equipped with six C64 guns, for a total of eighteen guns per unit. The foot artillery units had an equal mixture of 6-pounder Krupp guns and the lighter 4-pounders.

=== Service with Romania ===
With the establishment of the 2nd Artillery Regiment, the Romanian Army purchased 48 cannons in 1867. These were adopted as the Krupp Model 1868 guns and were the first breechloading cannons of Romania. Similarly to the Prussian guns, they were fitted with the Kreiner type double wedge breech mechanism with copper obturation, however, as the steel construction did not show much confidence, these first cannons were ordered to be made out of bronze. In 1871, another 48 cannons made out of steel and equipped with a cylindrical-prismatic wedge mechanism were purchased and adopted as the Krupp Model 1871 guns which became the first steel cannons of Romania. Unlike the Turkish carriage which was metallic, the Romanian guns had wooden carriages made out of elm or oak wood.

The C64 cannons were nicknamed Tunuri de 8 ("cannons of 8"), referring to their caliber. During the Romanian War of Independence, both types were used with the Model 1868 guns equipping the 1st and 2nd Artillery Regiments, and the Model 1871 guns equipping the 3rd and 4th Artillery Regiments. The cannons were retired in 1880 and moved to the reserve. A number of 48 pieces along with 35,455 projectiles were still registered on 15 August 1916.

=== Service with Turkey and Bulgaria ===
Between 1864 and 1874, the Ottoman Empire purchased 653 C64 guns. These were almost identical to the Prussian guns, except they were fitted with a cylindrical-prismatic wedge breech mechanism. Some of these Turkish guns were captured by the Russians during the Russo-Turkish War of 1877–1878 and later given to the Bulgarian Army.

== Users ==
- Bulgaria
- Ottoman Empire
- Prussia
- Romania

== Gallery ==
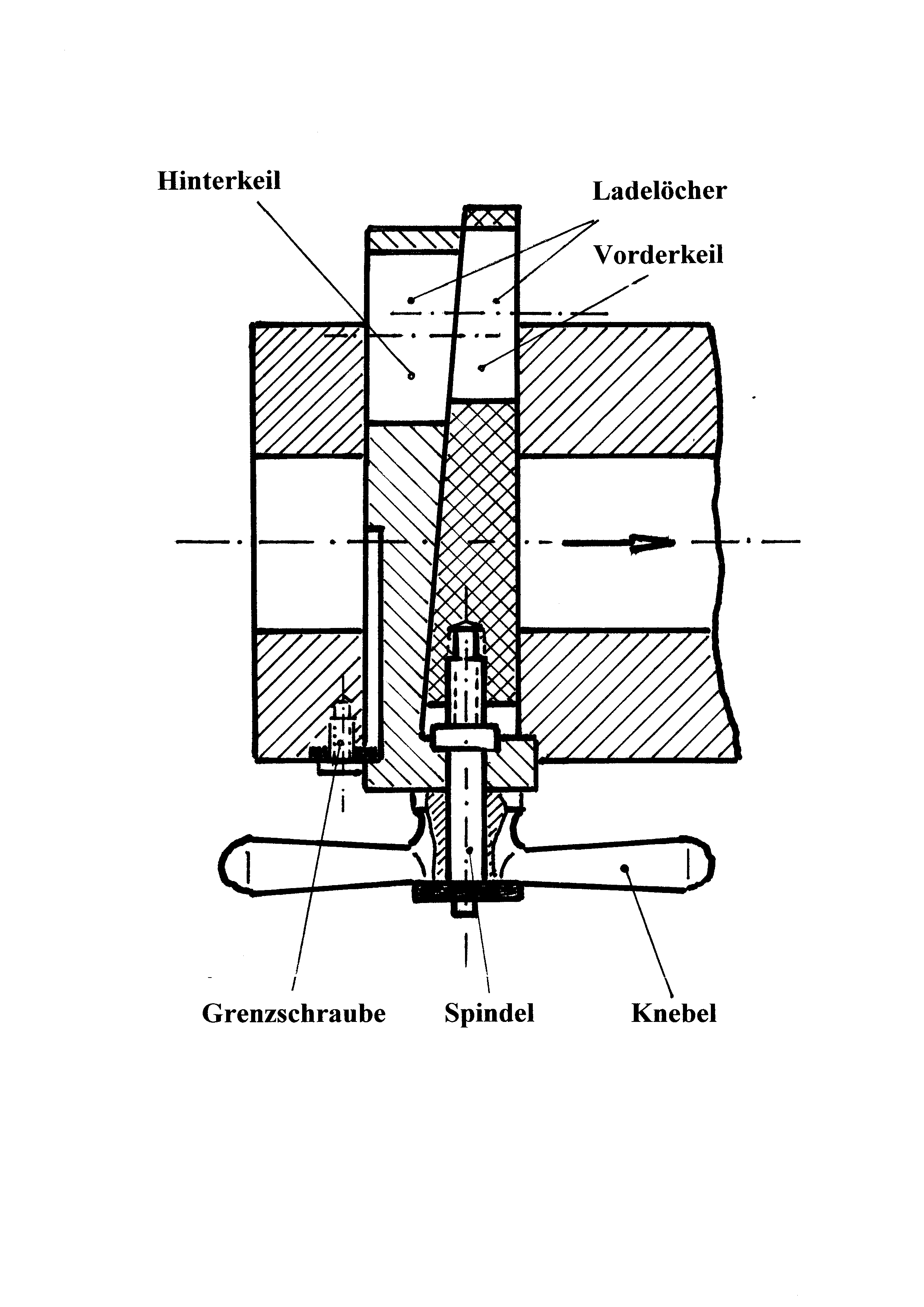
Illustration of the wedge lock of a C64.

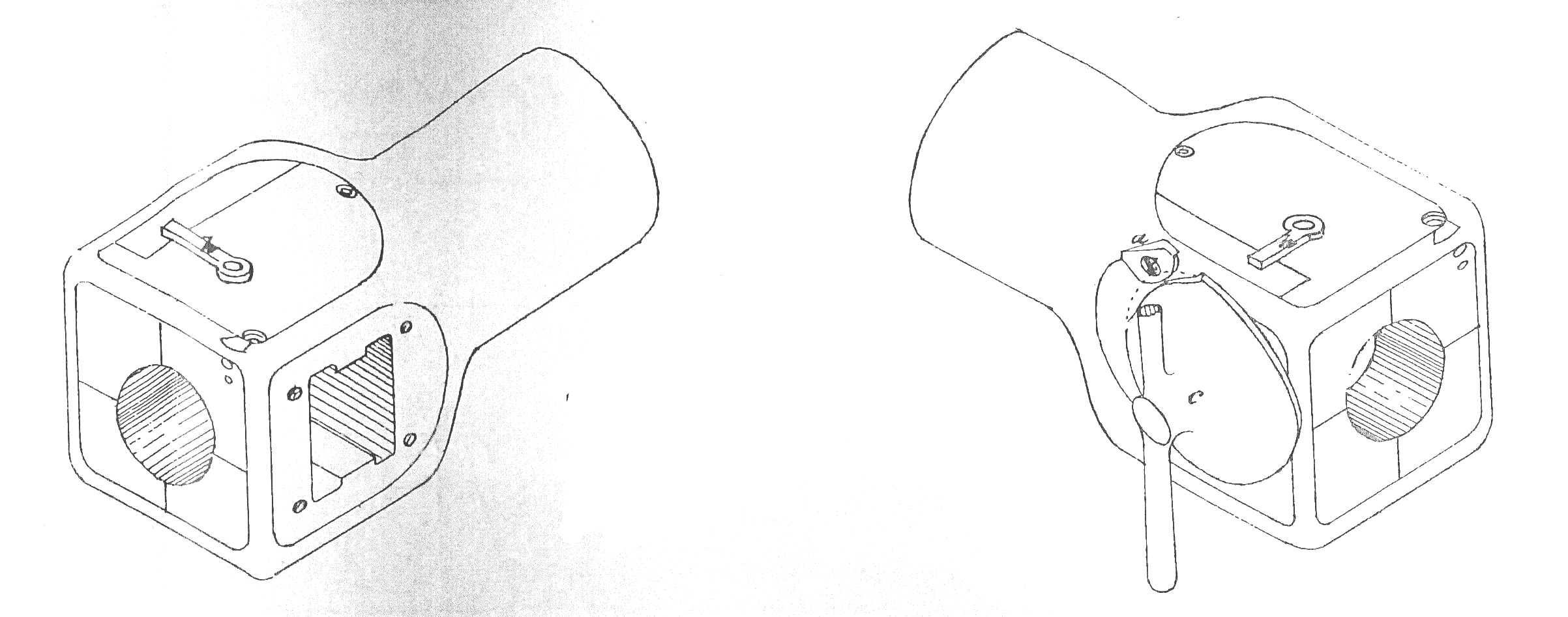
Side view of the closure of a C64

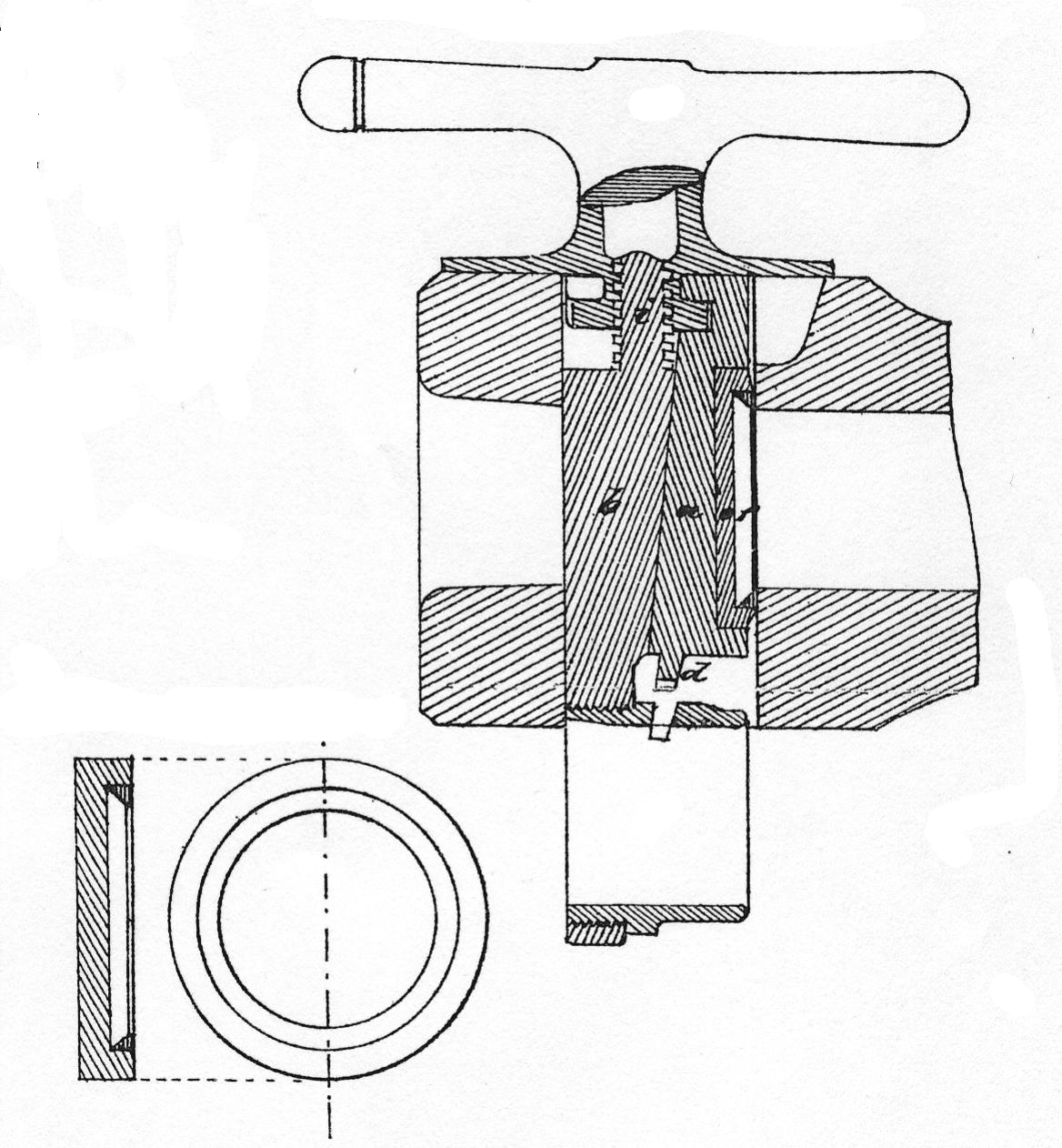
Section through the closure of a double wedge C64

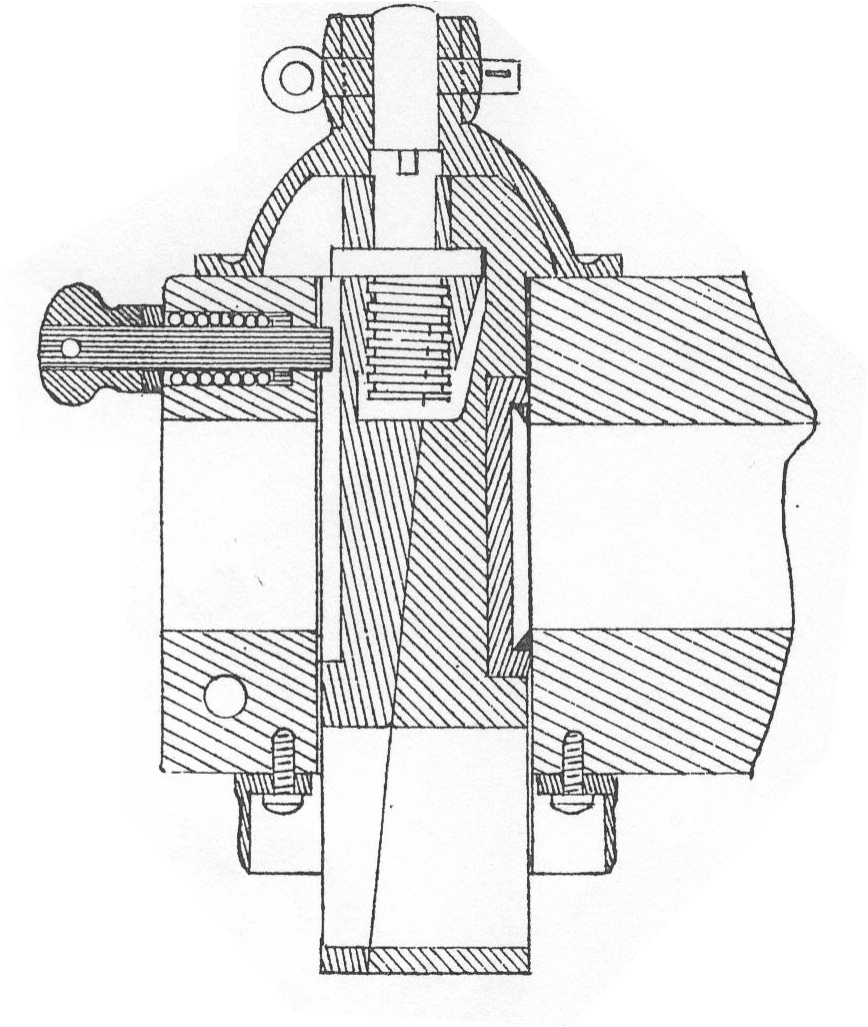
Section through the closure of a double wedge C64/67

== See also ==
- 7.7 cm FK 96

== Bibliography ==
- Stroea, Adrian; Băjenaru, Gheorghe (2010). Artileria Romana in date si Imagini (PDF) (in Romanian). Editura Centrului Tehnic-Editorial.
