= 7.5 cm FK 16 nA =

WW2 German field gun

7.5 cm Feldkanone 16 neuer Art
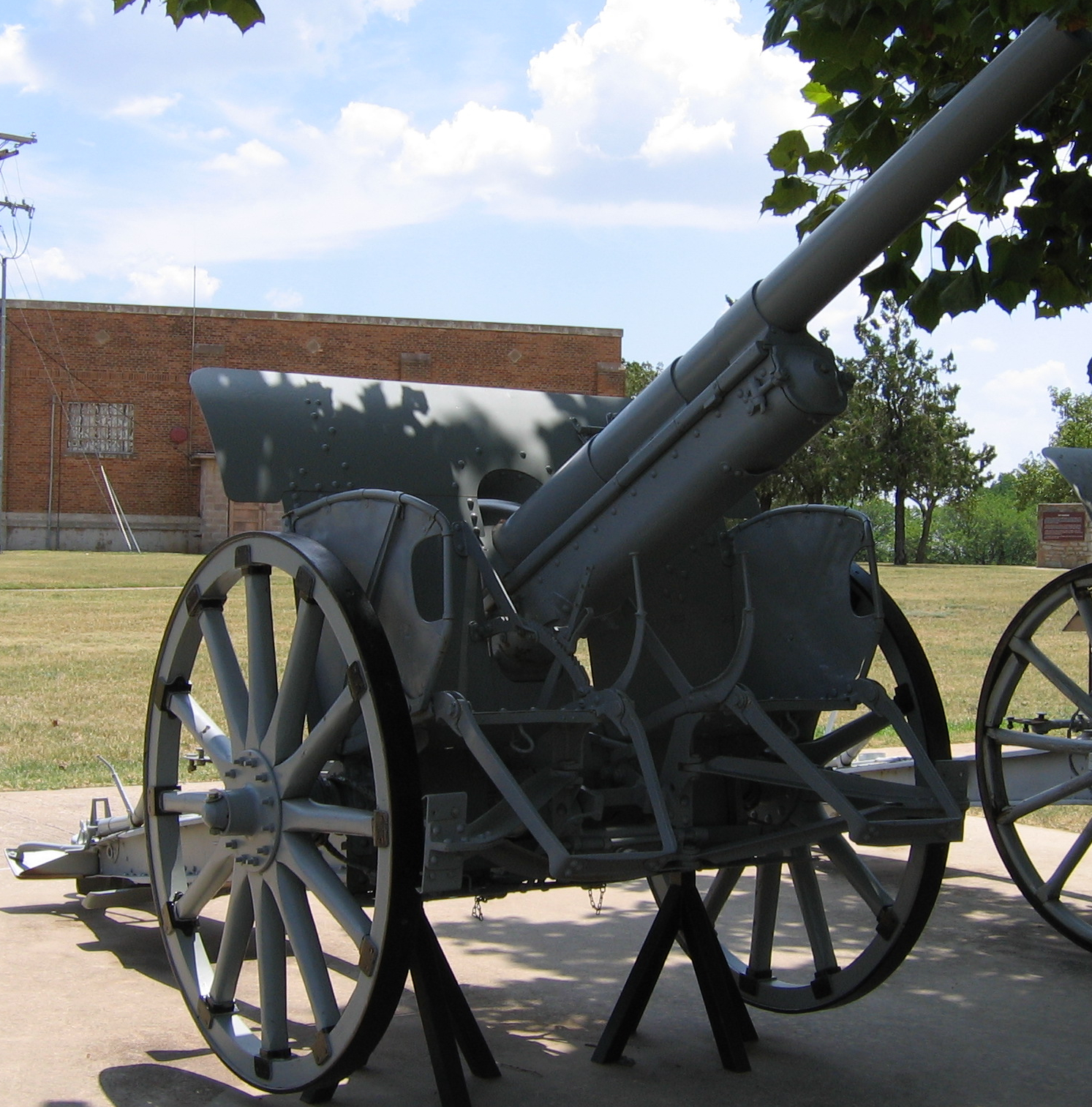
- FK 16 nA at U.S. Army Field Artillery Museum, Ft. Sill, OK
- Type: Field gun
- Place of origin: Nazi Germany

Service history
- In service: 1939–1945
- Used by: Nazi Germany, Brazil
- Wars: World War II

Production history
- Manufacturer: Rheinmetall
- Produced: 1930s

Specifications
- Mass: 1,524 kg (3,360 lbs)
- Barrel length: 2.7 m (9 ft) L/36
- Shell: 75 × 200 mm. R
- Shell weight: 5.83 kilograms (12.9 lb) (HE); 6.8 kilograms (15 lb) (AP)
- Caliber: 75 mm (2.95 in)
- Breech: horizontal sliding-block
- Recoil: Hydro-pneumatic
- Carriage: box trail
- Elevation: -9° to +44°
- Traverse: 4°
- Muzzle velocity: 662 m/s (2,172 ft/s)
- Effective firing range: 12,300 m (13,450 yds)
- Filling: TNT or amatol
- Filling weight: 0.52 kilograms (1.1 lb)

The 7.5 cm Feldkanone 16 neuer Art (7.5 cm FK 16 nA) was a field gun used by Germany in World War II. Originally built as the World War I-era 7.7 cm FK 16, surviving guns in German service were re-barrelled during the early 1930s in the new standard 7.5 cm calibre. It was not modernized for motor towing and retained its original wooden spoked wheels and two crew seats on the face of the gun shield.

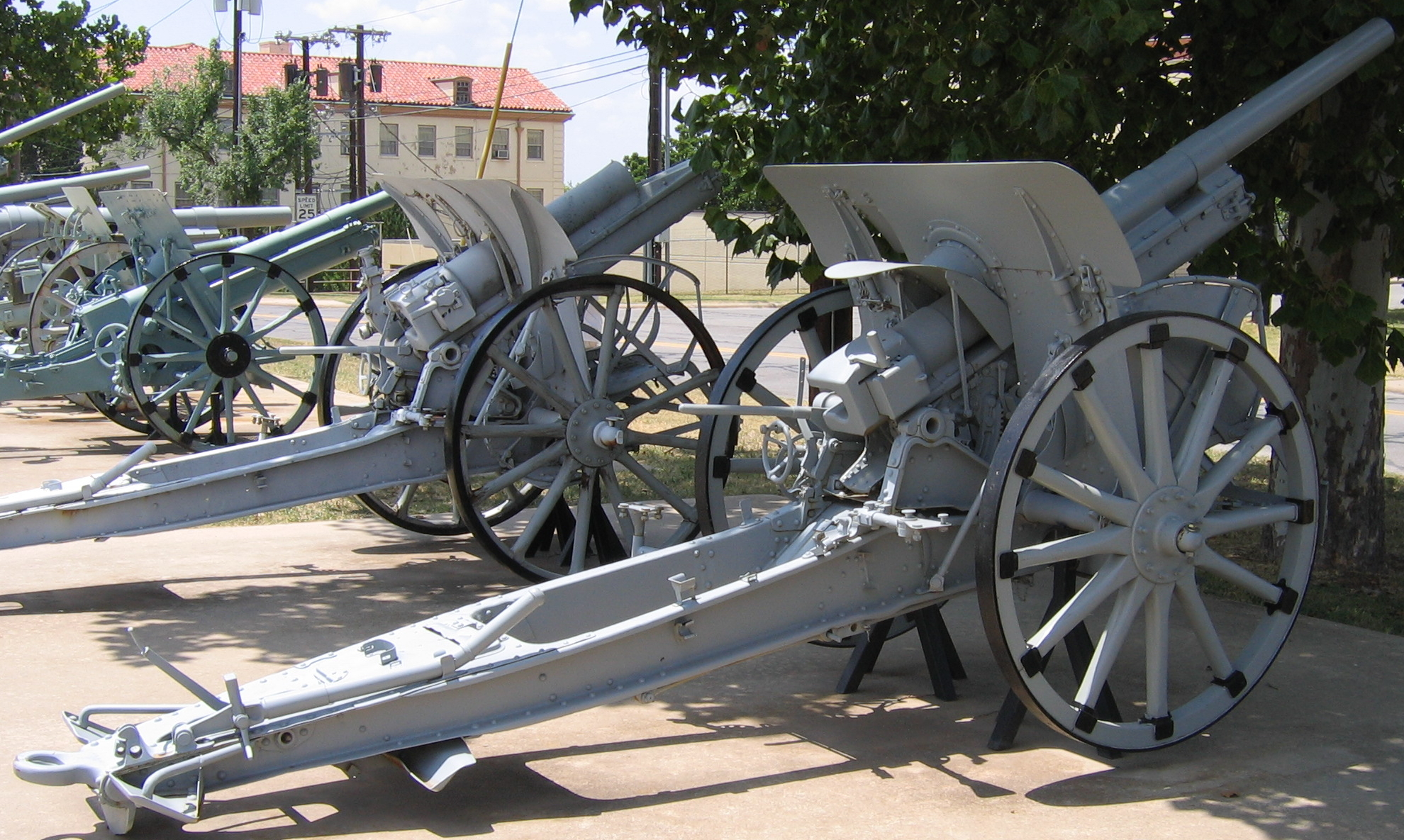
Right side of FK 16 nA on display at U.S. Army Field Artillery Museum, Ft. Sill, OK.

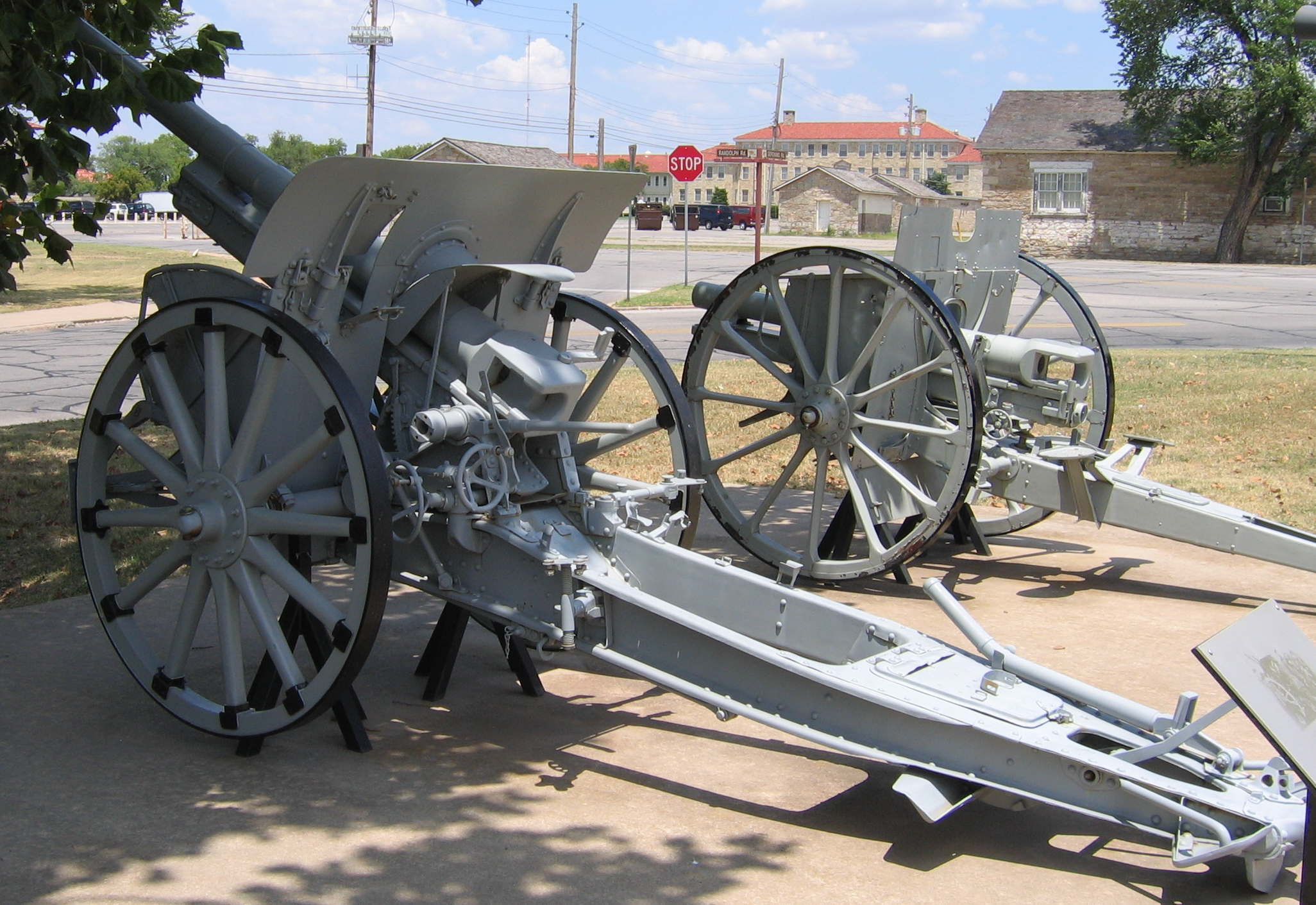
Left side of FK 16 Na at U.S. Army Field Artillery Museum, Ft. Sill, OK.

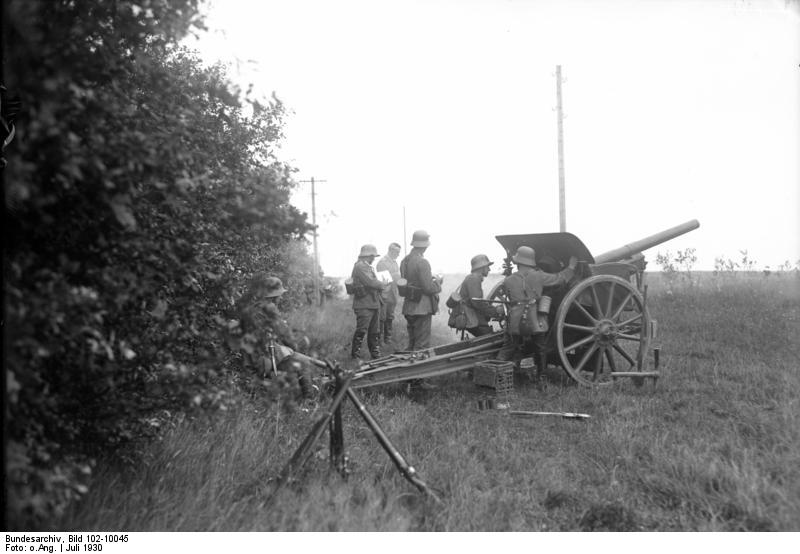
More distanced view of FK16 nA.

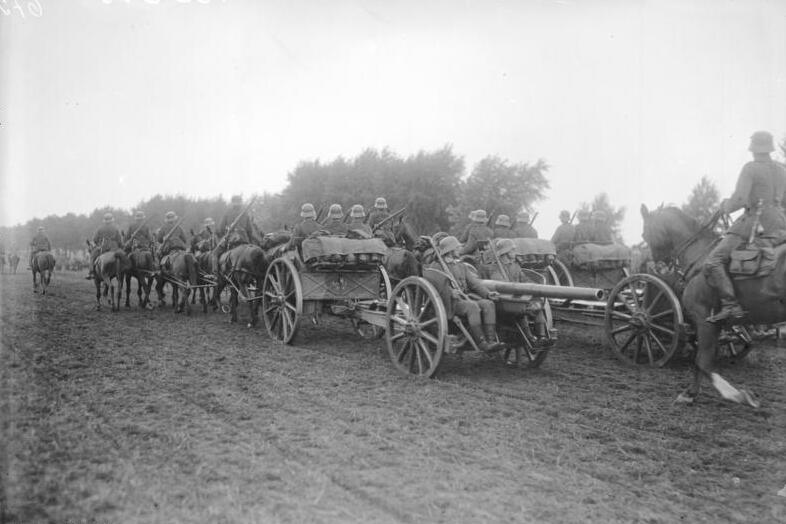
FK 16 nA in transport.

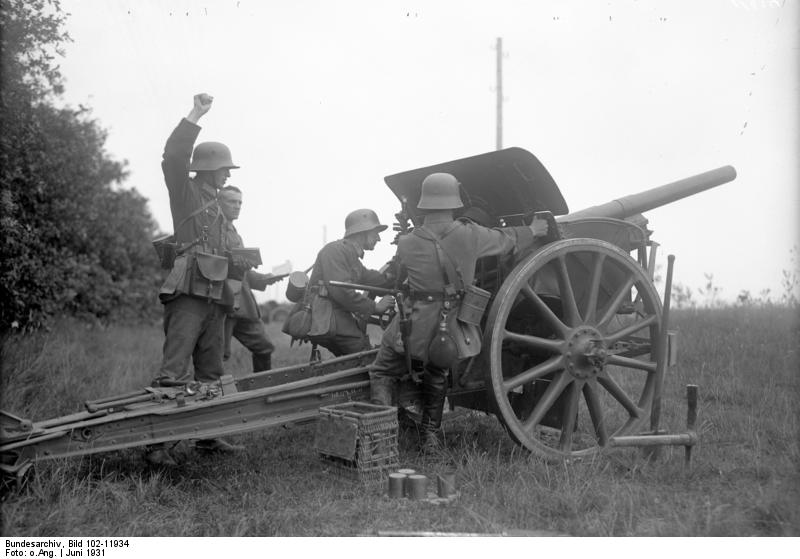
Closer view of FK 16 nA in action

== History ==
Over 3,000 FK 16 guns were made in 1916-1918 and they remained in use in the Interwar period's Reichswehr. In the 1930s its 7.7cm barrel was redesigned to become the standardised calibre of 7.5cm and the modified guns were named the '7.5cm FK nA' with 'nA' standing for 'neuer Art' or 'new pattern'. It was originally meant to be a horse-drawn cavalry support gun but it was later used with any type of formation in need of a light gun. One of these guns where tested in the Hillersleben test range in 1941 where it managed to achieve a maximum range of over , 30% more than its designed maximum.
