= List of artillery by country =

This list contains all artillery systems organized primarily by their country of origin. In cases where multiple countries collaborated on a project, a system could be listed under each of the major participants. Also, in outstanding cases where a system was adopted fully by another country, the system may be listed there also. This list is not an attempt to list every artillery system ever used by each country.

Jump to a specific country in the table below.

Albania; Argentina; Australia; Austria; Belgium; Brazil; Canada; China; Croatia; Czech Republic/Slovakia/Czechoslovakia; Finland; France; (Georgia (country)) Georgia; Germany; Greece	Hungary; India; Indonesia; Iran; Israel; Italy; Japan; Mexico; Myanmar; Netherlands; New Zealand; Norway; Pakistan; Philippines; Portugal; Poland	Romania; Serbia; Singapore; South Africa; Soviet Union; Russia; Spain; Sri Lanka; Sweden; Switzerland; Syria; (Taiwan) Republic of China; Thailand; Turkey; United Kingdom; United States; Vietnam; (Socialist Federal Republic of Yugoslavia) Yugoslavia

== Albania ==
Mortars

- Hirtenberger M6
- Hirtenberger M8
- PM43
- Type 67

== Argentina ==
Field artillery

- Model 1968 105 mm model 1968 recoilless gun
- CITEFA Model 77 Cold War/modern 155 mm gun/howitzer, based on the French 155 mm gun mounted on AMX Mk F3 SP gun
- CALA 30 155 mm L45 long range gun

Self-propelled field artillery

- VCA 155 self-propelled 155 mm howitzer, based on a TAM chassis with a Palmaria turret

Rocket artillery

- SLAM Pampero 105 mm multiple rocket launcher
- SAC SAPBA 127 mm multiple rocket launcher
- CP-30 127 mm multiple rocket launcher
- VCLC 160 mm or 350 mm multiple rocket launcher
- EDESA Yarará 70 mm multiple rocket launcher

== Australia ==
- Ordnance QF 25-pounder Short World War II pack howitzer based on British 25 pounder gun-howitzer
- BL 5.5-inch medium gun mid-1940s to 1980s
- L16 81mm mortar
- M101 105 mm towed howitzer (M2A2)
- L119 105 mm towed gun
- M198 155 mm howitzer – 1980s to 2000s
- M777 155 mm medium howitzer – 2000s

=== Self-propelled artillery ===
- K-9 self-propelled howitzer artillery – possibly 2022 to future

=== Multiple launching rocket systems/rocket artillery ===
- M142 HIMARS MLRS rocket artillery – 2023 to future

== Austria ==
Mortars

- M6 mortar

Self-propelled field artillery

- M109 – 155 mm self-propelled howitzer

== Belgium ==
Mortars

- RT F1 120 mm heavy mortar

Field artillery

- GIAT LG1 105 mm towed howitzer

== Brazil ==
Self-propelled field artillery

- M109 howitzer 155 mm self-propelled
- M108 howitzer 105 mm self-propelled

Field artillery

- M114 155 mm howitzer – 155 mm towed
- L119 – 105 mm towed howitzer
- M101 howitzer – 105 mm towed
- M56 – 105 mm towed howitzer
- 120mm M2 raiado – 120 mm towed mortar
- M936 AGR – 81 mm towed mortar
- M949 AGR – 60 mm light mortar

Multiple rocket launchers

- Astros II MLRS – multiple rocket launcher
- AV-SS 12/36 – light multiple rocket launcher to assist infantry troops

== Canada ==
Field artillery

- GC-45 howitzer 155 mm
- C1 105 mm howitzer
- C3 105 mm howitzer
- L5 105 mm pack howitzer
- LG-1 105 mm howitzer
- M109 self-propelled 155 mm howitzer
- M777 155 mm medium howitzer

Anti-aircraft guns

- Oerlikon 20 mm cannon

== China ==
Anti-aircraft gun

- Type 90 PG99 35 mm anti-aircraft twin-gun
- Type 87 - Chinese 25mm variant of ZU-23-2

Self-propelled anti-aircraft gun

- Type 63 anti-aircraft gun
- Type-80: Chinese version of the ZSU-57-2
- Type 09 (Type 09)
- Type 95
- SWS2 anti-aircraft gun/surface-to-air missile

Towed field artillery

- Type 60 towed 122 mm howitzer
- Type 83 towed 122 mm howitzer
- Type 66 152 mm towed gun-howitzer
- Type 59-1 130 mm towed field gun
- Type 89 155 mm howitzer
- Norinco AH4 155mm howitzer

Self-propelled field artillery

- Type 54-1 self-propelled 122 mm gun
- Type 83 self-propelled 152 mm gun
- PCL-181
- PLZ-07
- PLZ-89
- PLZ-05 self-propelled 155 mm howitzer
- PLZ-45 self-propelled 155 mm howitzer
- Type 83 SPH
- PLZ-08

Recoilless rifles

- Type 65
- Type 65-1

Mortars

- Type 67 mortar

Mortar carriers

- PLL-05
- PLL-08
- WMA029

Multiple rocket launchers

- Huo Che
- Kung Feng multiple launch rocket system
- WM-80 MRL
- A-100 MRL
- WS-1B multiple rocket launcher
- WS-2D multiple rocket launcher
- Type 63 multiple rocket launcher
- Type 70
- Type 81 (rocket launcher)
- Type 82 artillery
- PHL-96
- PHL-03
- SR-5 – Chinese export 122/220mm MLRS
- Norinco AR3

== Croatia ==
Rocket artillery

- LRSV-122 M-96 "Tajfun"

== Czech Republic and Slovakia ==
Anti-aircraft guns

- Škoda 76.5 mm L/50

Anti-tank guns

- 85 mm vz. 52
- 100 mm vz. 53

Self-propelled anti-aircraft guns

- M53/59 self-propelled twin 30 mm cannon
- BRAMS

Self-propelled artillery

- 155 mm TMG EVA 155 mm self-propelled gun howitzer
- 155 mm SpGH Zuzana 155 mm self-propelled gun howitzer
- 152 mm SpGH DANA self-propelled 152 mm howitzer

Towed siege howitzer

- Skoda 220 mm howitzer

Light howitzer

- Škoda 7.5 cm d/29 Model 1911
- Škoda 10 cm vz. 38 howitzer

Self-propelled multiple rocket launcher

- RM-51
- RM-70 multiple rocket launcher

== Finland ==
Anti-aircraft guns

- 20 ITK 40 VKT – 20 mm twin AA gun
- ZU-23-2 – 23 mm twin AA gun
- Oerlikon GDF – 35 mm twin AA gun
- Bofors 40 Mk.3
- Bofors 57 Mk.3

Towed field artillery

- 105 K 34 – 105 mm towed gun
- 152 H 88-31 – 152 mm towed howitzer
- 122 K 60 – 122 mm towed gun
- 130 K 54 – 130 mm towed gun
- 130 K 90-60 – 130 mm towed gun
- 152 H 88-40 – 152 mm towed howitzer
- 152 H 55 – 152 mm towed howitzer
- 152 H 88 – 152 mm towed gun
- 152 H 88-37 – 152 mm towed howitzer
- 155 K 98 – 155 mm towed gun
- 155 K 83 – 155 mm towed gun
- 122 H 63 – 122 mm towed howitzer
- 152 K 89 – 152 mm towed gun

Self-propelled artillery

- AMOS – 120 mm twin barreled mortar
- K9FIN Moukari – 155 mm self-propelled howitzer
- 122 PSH 74 – 122 mm self-propelled howitzer
- 152 TELAK 91 – 152 mm self-propelled gun

Rocket artillery

- 122 RAKH 76
- 122 RAKH 91
- 227 RAKH 07

Coastal artillery

- 57 55 J
- 100 56 TK
- 130 53 TK

== France ==
Mortars

- Lance Grenades de 50 mm modèle 37
- 240 mm trench mortar
- 9.45-inch heavy mortar
- Brandt Mle 27/31 used in World War II
- LLR 81mm designed in 1961, current French infantry mortar
- Brandt Mle CM60A1, breech-loading for use in armoured vehicles
- Brandt 60 mm LR gun-mortar, breech-loading for use in armoured vehicles
- RT F1 120 mm towed heavy mortar

Self-propelled anti-aircraft guns

- M3 VDA self-propelled twin 20 mm cannon

Field artillery

- Canon d'Infanterie de 37 modèle 1916 TRP, a rapid firing infantry support gun
- Canon de 65 M (montagne) modele 1906, a mountain gun that could be carried by four mules
- Canon de 75 M(montagne) modele 1919 Schneider, replacement for the mle 1906
- Canon de 75 M(montagne) modele 1928
- Canon de 75 modèle 1897, 75 mm gun, one of the most famous guns of World War I
- Canon de 75 modèle 1912 Schneider, for use by horse artillery
- Canon de 75 modèle 1914 Schneider. longer range version of the modèle 1912 gun
- Reffye 75mm cannon modèle 1873
- De Bange 80 mm cannon modèle 1877
- Reffye 85mm cannon modèle 1870, an early breech-loading gun
- De Bange 90 mm cannon modèle 1877, still in service in World War I
- Lahitolle 95 mm cannon modèle 1875, still in service in World War I
- Canon Court de 105 M(montagne) modele 1909 Schneider
- Canon Court de 105 M(montagne) modèle 1919 Schneider, replacement for the mle 1909
- Canon de 105 L mle 1936 Schneider field gun used in WWII
- Canon de 105 court mle 1934 Schneider howitzer
- Canon de 105 court mle 1935 B howitzer
- Canon de 105 mle 1913 Schneider used in both World Wars
- Obusier de 105 modèle 1950
- Obusier de 120 mm mle 15TR
- GIAT LG1
- Canon de 145 L modele 1916 Saint-Chamond conversion of a naval gun to field gun
- 152 mm howitzer M1910 Russian gun designed by Schneider
- Canon de 155 C modèle 1915 St. Chamond howitzer
- Canon de 155 C modèle 1917 Schneider howitzer
- Canon de 155 L Modele 1917 Schneider
- Canon de 155 L modele 1916 Saint-Chamond rebored Canon de 145 L modele 1916 Saint-Chamond
- Canon de 155 L modèle 1877/14 Schneider
- Canon de 155 L modèle 1918 Schneider
- Canon de 155mm GPF modèle 1917, the standard French heavy gun into WWII
- De Bange 155 mm cannon the French artillery piece that debuted the 155 mm caliber in widespread use today, still in service in WWI
- Obusier de 155 mm Modèle 50 post-war howitzer
- Rimailho Model 1904TR quick-firing howitzer used in WWI
- TRF1 155 mm howitzer introduced in 1990
- Canon de 19 C modèle 1870/93 coastal artillery
- Canon de 19 C modèle 1875 coastal artillery
- Mortier de 220 mm TR mle 1915/1916
- Canon de 220 L mle 1917
- Mortier de 280 modèle 1914 Schneider heavy siege howitzer

Self-propelled artillery

- Mk 61 105 mm self-propelled howitzer
- Mk F3 155mm self-propelled gun/howitzer in service 1962-1977
- GCT 155mm designed in 1976 to replace the Mk F3
- CAESAR self-propelled 155 mm gun
- Canon de 194 mle GPF, the first French self-propelled gun, used in WWI
- Mortier 280 mm TR de Schneider sur affût-chenilles St Chamond

Naval artillery

- Paixhans guns nineteenth-century naval guns
- Canon de 305 mm Modèle 1887

Railroad artillery

- Canon de 19 modèle 1870/93 TAZ
- Canon de 164 modèle 1893/96 TAZ
- 24 cm Canon G modèle 1916
- Canon de 274 modèle 93/96 Berceau
- Canon de 274 modèle 87/93 Glissement
- Canon de 305 modèle 93/96 TAZ
- Canon de 32 modèle 1870/93
- Obusier de 370 modèle 1915
- Canon de 370 modèle 75/79 Glissement
- Obusier de 400 Modèle 1915/1916
- Obusier de 520 modèle 1916

== Georgia ==
Rocket artillery

- ZCRS-122 multiple rocket launcher firing 122 mm rockets. It was developed in 2011

== Germany ==
=== 1870 to 1919 ===
Batteries (Naval artillery)

- Batterie Pommern World War I 380 mm gun

Siege artillery

- Big Bertha 420 mm howitzer
- Paris Gun World War I 210 mm gun

Mortars

- 25 cm schwerer Minenwerfer

Field Artillery

- 10.5 cm Feldhaubitze 98/09 WWI era 105 mm howitzer
- 10.5 cm leFH 16 WWI era 105 mm howitzer

=== 1920 to 1945 ===
Infantry guns

- 7.5 cm leichtes Infanteriegeschütz 18
- 15 cm sIG 33

Artillery

- 10.5 cm leFH 18
- 10.5 cm sK 18/40
- 15 cm sFH 02
- 15 cm sFH 18
- 17 cm Kanone 18
- 21 cm Kanone 38
- 21 cm Mörser 16
- 21 cm Mörser 18
- 28 cm Haubitze L/12
- 42 cm Gamma Mörser
- 35.5 cm Haubitze M1
- Schwerer Gustav

Anti-aircraft guns

- 2 cm Flakvierling 38 quadruple anti-aircraft gun
- 2 cm FlaK 30 anti-aircraft gun
- 2 cm Fliegerabwehrkanone 30 anti-aircraft gun
- 2 cm Fliegerabwehrkanone 38 anti-aircraft gun
- 20 mm C/30 World War II naval anti-aircraft gun
- 3.7 cm SK C/30
- 3.7 cm FlaK 43 anti-aircraft gun
- 8.8 cm Flak 18/36/37/41 anti-aircraft gun
- 10.5 cm FlaK 38 anti-aircraft gun
- 12.8 cm Flak 40 anti-aircraft gun

Anti-tank guns

- 3.7 cm Pak 36
- 5 cm Pak 38
- 7.5 cm Pak 40
- 8.8 cm Pak 43
- 8 cm PAW 600

Dual-use gun

- 88 mm gun-a popular calibre for a series of anti-aircraft and anti-tank guns

Railway artillery

- 21 cm K 12 (E)
- 28 cm schwere Bruno Kanone (E)
- Schwerer Gustav

Rocket artillery

- 8 cm Raketen-Vielfachwerfer

Mortars

- 5 cm Granatwerfer 36
- 8 cm Granatwerfer 34
- Kz 8 cm GrW 42
- 10 cm Nebelwerfer 35
- 10 cm Nebelwerfer 40
- 12 cm Granatwerfer 42
- 20 cm leichter Ladungswerfer
- 21 cm Granatwerfer 69
- 38 cm schwerer Ladungswerfer

Mortar carriers

- Karl-Gerät
- Reihenwerfer

See also

- German designations of foreign artillery in World War II

=== 1946 to present ===
Anti-aircraft guns

- Rheinmetall 20 mm Twin Anti-Aircraft Cannon

Self-propelled anti-aircraft guns

- Gepard twin 35 mm self-propelled anti-aircraft gun system

Field artillery

- FH-70 155 mm howitzer in service with the Bundeswehr 1978 til 31-01-2002

Self-propelled artillery

- M-109 155 mm self-propelled howitzer of US origin
- Panzerhaubitze 2000 155 mm self-propelled howitzer

Tank guns

- LTA2 105 mm tank gun
- Rheinmetall 120 mm gun smoothbore tank gun

== Greece ==
Anti-aircraft guns

- Artemis 30 2x30mm anti-aircraft gun

== Hungary ==
Howitzers

- 105 mm MÁVAG 40/43M

== India ==
Mortars

- OFB E1 51 mm mortar
- L16 81mm mortar
- Ordnance ML 4.2 inch mortar
- 120 mm E1 light mortar
- 81 mm mortars for infantry
- 160 mm mortars in reserve

Howitzers

- 105/37 mm Indian field gun
- 155/39mm Haubits FH77
- 155/45mm Dhanush howitzer
- 155/39mm M777 howitzer
- 155/52mm Advanced towed artillery gun system
- 122 mm howitzer 2A18 (D-30)
- 155/45mm Bharat 45
- 155/52mm Bharat 52
- 155/39mm MARG-T/S
- 155/52mm ULH ER
- 155/45mm Sharang

Mortar carrier

- Carrier Mortar Tracked

Coastal defence

- Middle Ground Coastal Battery (Historical)

Heavy gun

- 180 mm gun S-23

Recoilless rifle

- Carl Gustaf 8.4 cm recoilless rifle (RCL MK 2 & RCL MK 3)
- M40 recoilless rifle

Anti-tank gun

- 85 mm anti-tank gun D-48

Field gun

- BL 5.5-inch medium gun (reserve)
- 100 mm field gun M1944 (BS-3)
- Indian field gun MK 1/2/3
- 130 mm towed field gun M1954 (M-46)
- Indian field gun

Anti-aircraft guns

- ZU-23-2
- AZP S-60
- KPV heavy machine gun
- All weather air defence gun system (AWADGS)
- 40 mm Bofors L/70 anti-aircraft gun (upgraded variant)
- 40 mm Bofors L/60 anti-aircraft gun (upgraded variant)

Self-propelled anti-aircraft gun

- ZSU Shilka
- 2K22 Tunguska

Mountain guns

- 2.75 inch (70 mm) mountain gun (World War I)
- 75 mm/24 Pounder Indian mountain gun
- 76 mm mountain gun
- 88 mm mountain gun
- 94 mm 3.7-inch mountain howitzer (Reserved)

Self-propelled artillery

- 155/52mm Bhim self-propelled howitzer
- 155/52mm K9 Thunder (Vajra)
- 155/52mm Bharat 52 (155 mm Truck Mounted SPH)
- 155/52mm Tata mounted gun system (MGS)
- OFB 105mm SPG (tracked)
- 122mm M-46 Catapult (tracked)
- 2S1 Gvozdika
- FV433 Abbot SPG
- 155/52mm OFB mounted gun system
- 155/39mm Marg-S mounted gun system
- 105/37mm Garuda V2
- 105/37mm IFB mounted gun system

Rocket artillery

- BM-21 Grad
- Pinaka multi-barrel rocket launcher
- BM-30 Smerch

=== Missile artillery ===
- BrahMos missile system
- Agni missile system
- Prithvi missile system
- Prahaar missile
- Pralay missile
- Shaurya missile

== Indonesia ==
Anti-aircraft guns

- DShK 12.7mm heavy anti-aircraft machine gun
- Rheinmetall 20 mm twin anti-aircraft cannon
- Zastava M55 A2 20mm Triple-barreled automatic anti-aircraft gun
- ZUR-23-2 kg-I twin 23mm anti-aircraft Cannon
- Norinco Type 85 Giant Bow II 23mm Twin Anti-aircraft Cannon
- Norinco Type 85 Shengong Air Defense System
- Type 90 twin 35 mm anti-aircraft gun
- Oerlikon Skyshield 35mm air defense system
- M1939 61-K 37 mm automatic anti-aircraft gun
- Bofors L/70 40 mm anti-aircraft gun
- AZP S-60 57 mm anti-aircraft gun
- CNPMIEC TD-2000B air defense system

Mortars

- Pindad 40 mm silent mortar
- Pindad Mo-1 60 mm mortar
- Pindad Mo-2 60 mm mortar
- Pindad Mo-3 81 mm mortar
- Norinco Type W87 81 mm mortar
- M1938 120 mm mortar

Self-propelled mortar

- Anoa mortar carrier 81 mm self-propelled mortar

Towed artillery

- M48 76 mm mountain gun
- GIAT LG1 mk.II 105 mm light howitzer
- M2A1 105 mm towed howitzer
- KH178 105 mm towed howitzer
- M1938 (M-30) 122 mm towed howitzer
- FH-2000 155 mm towed howitzer
- KH179 155 mm towed howitzer
- Pindad ME-105 Towed Artillery

Self-propelled artillery

- AMX Mk61 105 mm self-propelled howitzer
- CAESAR 155 mm self-propelled howitzer
- M109A4-BE 155 mm self-propelled howitzer

Rocket artillery

- NDL-40 70 mm multiple rocket towed launcher
- R-Han 122 122 mm multiple rocket launcher
- RM-70 122 mm multiple rocket launcher
- RM-70 Vampir 122 mm multiple rocket launcher
- Type 90B 122 mm multiple rocket launcher
- M-51 140 mm multiple rocket launcher
- Astros II Mk.6 300 mm multiple rocket launcher

== Iran ==
Anti-aircraft guns

- ZU-23 twin 23 mm anti-aircraft cannon
- Mesbah 1
- Samavat 35 mm twin anti-aircraft cannon
- Sa'ir 100 mm air defense gun KS-19

Field artillery

- 122 mm howitzer 2A18 (D-30)
- Howitzer 155 mm HM-41

Self-propelled artillery

- Raad-1
- Raad-2
- Koksan

Anti-tank guns

- 2A45 Sprut-B 125 mm anti-tank gun.

Rocket artillery

- Samid
- Falaq-1
- Falaq-2
- Fajr-1
- Fajr-2
- Fajr-3
- Fajr-5
- HM 20
- Tondar-69
- Shahin-II
- Arash
- Oghab
- Naze'at
- Zelzal-1
- Zelzal-2
- Zelzal-3

Mortars

- 37mm marsh mortar
- 60 mm HM 12
- 60 mm HM 13
- 60 mm HM 14
- 81 mm HM 15
- 120 mm HM 16

== Israel ==
Field artillery

- Soltam M-68
- Soltam M-71
- L-33 155 mm howitzer

Self-propelled artillery

- Rascal 155 mm howitzer
- Doher Improved M109AL 155 mm howitzer
- ATMOS 2000 155 mm howitzer

Rocket artillery

- LAR-160 160 mm x 36 tubes rocket launcher
- MAR-240 240 mm x 36 rails rocket launcher
- MAR-290 290 mm x 4 rails rocket launcher

Mortars

- Soltam K5
- Soltam K6

== Italy ==
Anti-aircraft guns

- Breda 35 20 mm automatic cannon
- Breda L/70 40 mm anti-aircraft gun
- SIDAM 25 self-propelled quad 25 mm cannon
- SIDAM 35 self-propelled twin 35 mm cannon
- Draco 76-mm self-propelled anti-aircraft gun

Mountain artillery

- 65 mm mountain gun
- Cannone da 70/15
- Cannone da 75/27 modello 11

Field artillery

- Cannone da 75/27 modello 06
- Model 56 (simplified name for the OTO Melara Mod 56)
- Obice da 75/18 modello 34 75 mm howitzer
- FH-70 155 mm howitzer
- Obice da 149/12
- Obice da 210/22 210 mm howitzer
- Mortaio da 260/9 Modello 16
- Obice da 305/17 305 mm coastal defense and siege howitzer
- Siege gun model 1877 149 mm gun

Self-propelled artillery

- Palmaria self-propelled 155 mm howitzer
- PzH 2000 155 mm self-propelled howitzer

== Japan ==
Anti-aircraft guns

- Type 99 88 mm AA gun

Self-propelled anti-aircraft guns

- Type 87 self-propelled anti-aircraft gun (35 mm cannon)

Infantry guns

- Type 11 37 mm infantry gun
- Type 92 battalion gun (70 mm)

Field artillery

- Type 35 gun 75 mm, WW2 and before
- Type 91 10 cm howitzer

Self-propelled artillery

- Type 60 self-propelled 106 mm recoilless gun (1956)
- Type 74 105 mm self-propelled howitzer (1974)
- Type 75 155 mm self-propelled howitzer (1975)
- Type 99 155 mm self-propelled howitzer (1985)
- Type 19 155 mm wheeled self-propelled howitzer

Rocket systems

- Type 67 Model 30 rocket artillery 307 mm
- Type 75 130 mm multiple rocket launcher being replaced by
- M270 multiple launch rocket system

== Mexico ==
- M101 105 mm towed howitzer
- OTO Melara Mod 56 105 mm towed howitzer
- Bofors 40mm gun 40 mm anti-aircraft autocannon

== Myanmar ==
=== Self-propelled artillery ===
- MAM-01 :122 mm multiple launch rocket system
- MAM-02 :240 mm multiple launch rocket system
- MAM-03 :300 mm multiple launch rocket system

== Netherlands ==
Field guns

- 7-veld & Siderius M 02/04

Mortars

- RT F1 120 mm mortar

Self-propelled artillery

- M109 howitzer
- PzH 2000 NL

== New Zealand ==
- 60mm M6 mortar
- 81 mm mortar, serving in Royal New Zealand Artillery
- L118 light gun 105 mm towed, phased out December 2000
- L119 105 mm towed gun, serving in Royal New Zealand Artillery

== Norway ==
Self-propelled artillery

- M 109 A3GN self-propelled howitzer, Norwegian version of M 109, in use: 1969-present
- Archer truck-mounted 155mm FH77 Swedish howitzer, test unit ordered in 2008
- K9 VIDAR self-propelled howitzer, Norwegion version of the K9A1. 24 ordered in 2017 (+4 in 2022) 28 total.

Rocket artillery

- M270 multiple launch rocket system (temporarily taken out of service, future status under evaluation in 2009 )

== Pakistan ==
- FATAH-1 300mm Guided Multiple Launch Rocket System
- KRL-122

== Philippines ==
- OTO Melara Mod 56 light howitzer
- M101 howitzer, some upgraded by GIAT
- M102 105 mm howitzer
- M114 155 mm howitzer
- Soltam M71 155mm howitzer

== Palestine/Hamas ==
Rocket artillery

- Al Quds 3

== Poland ==
- Nkm wz.38 FK – 20 mm anti-tank autocannon
- Bofors 37 mm – an antitank gun used by Poles in the "37 mm pattern 36" or "37mm wz.36"
- 75 mm armata wz.36 – 75 mm anti-aircraft gun
- Armata 75 mm wz.02/26 – 75 mm field gun
- 105 mm Armata wz. 29 – 105 mm field gun
- 120 mm Armata wz. 78/09/31 – 120 mm field gun
- WR-40 Langusta – 122 mm rocket system
- AHS Krab – 155 mm self-propelled howitzer
- 2S1 Gvozdika Goździk – 122 mm self-propelled howitzer
- M-98 mortar – 98 mm
- PZA Loara – 2x35 mm self-propelled AA gun
- ZSU-23-4 Shilka – 4x23 mm self-propelled AA gun
- ZU-23-2 – 2x23 mm AA gun
- ZSU-23-4MP Biała

== Portugal ==
Field artillery

- OTO Melara Mod 56 105 mm towed gun
- M101 105 mm towed gun
- L118 105 mm towed gun
- M114 155 mm towed gun
- Obusier de 15 cm TR Schneider-Canet-du-Bocage

Self-propelled artillery

- M109 A5 self-propelled howitzer

== Romania ==
- Model 1977 towed 100 mm anti-tank gun T-12
- Model 1989 122 mm howitzer–self-propelled 2S1 Gvozdika
- ATROM 155 mm gun–self-propelled ATMOS 2000
- Model 1981 152 mm towed howitzer 152 mm towed gun-howitzer M1955 (D-20)
- Model 1985 152 mm towed gun-howitzer 152 mm howitzer 2A65
- Model 1982 120 mm towed mortar 120-PM-43 mortar
- Model 1981 130 mm towed gun 130 mm towed field gun M1954 (M-46)
- Model 1977 82 mm towed mortar 82-PM-41
- Model 1982 76 mm towed gun 76 mm regimental gun M1943
- Model 1938 122 mm towed howitzer 122 mm howitzer M1938 (M-30)
- AG-9 73 mm SPG-9
- 85 mm anti-tank gun D-48
- 76 mm divisional gun M1939 (USV)
- 76 mm divisional gun M1942 (ZiS-3)
- LAROM rocket artillery 122mm*40 and 160mm*26
- HIMARS rocket artillery 227mm*6

== Republic of Korea (South Korea) ==
Self-propelled mortar

- K281A1 81mm Self-Propelled Mortar
- K242A1 107mm Self-Propelled Mortar
- Hanwha 120mm Self-propelled mortar

Towed artillery

- KH178 105 mm towed artillery
- KH179 155 mm towed artillery

Self-propelled artillery

- K105A1 105 mm self-propelled artillery
- K55 155 mm self-propelled artillery
- K9 Thunder 155 mm self-propelled artillery

Multiple rocket launcher

- K136 130 mm multiple rocket launcher
- K239
- M270 multiple launch rocket system (MLRS)

== People's Democratic Republic of Korea (North Korea) ==
Self-propelled artillery

- M-1978 Koksan

Rocket artillery

- KN-09 (MRL)

== Serbia ==
Recoilless gun

- M60 recoilless gun

Field artillery

- M-56 howitzer
- M-46 The 130 mm towed field gun M1954
- Field gun-howitzer M84 NORA The 152 mm and 155mm field gun-howitzer

Self-propelled artillery

- 2S1 Gvozdika self-propelled howitzer
- Nora B-52 self-propelled rocket artillery
- M-77 Oganj rocket artillery
- M-87 Orkan rocket artillery
- LRSVM Morava rocket artillery

== Singapore ==
Self-propelled mortars

- M106 – a 120 mm mortar equipped variant of the M113 armored personnel carrier
- Bronco ATTC Mortar tracked carrier – 120 mm mortar equipped variant of the Bronco ATTC

Field artillery

- FH-88 – 155 mm/39-cal field howitzer
- FH-2000 – 155 mm/52-cal field howitzer

Self-propelled artillery

- SSPH-1 Primus – 155 mm/39-cal self-propelled howitzer
- SLWH Pegasus – 155 mm/39-cal heli-portable lightweight self-propelled howitzer

== South Africa ==
Mortars

- M10 60 mm mortar

Field artillery

- G5 155 mm howitzer
- G7 105 mm howitzer

Self-propelled mortars

- Ratel 81 self-propelled 81 mm mortar

Self-propelled artillery

- G6 self-propelled 155 mm howitzer
- T6 self-propelled 155 mm howitzer

Truck mounted artillery

- T5-52 155 mm self-propelled howitzer

Rocket artillery

- Valkiri self-propelled multiple rocket launcher

== Soviet Union ==
Anti-aircraft guns

- 76 mm air defense gun M1931
- 76 mm air defense gun M1938
- 85 mm air defense gun M1939 (52-K)
- 37 mm automatic air defense gun M1939 (61-K)
- 25 mm automatic air defense gun M1940 (72-K)
- 45 mm anti-aircraft gun (21-K)
- 100 mm air defense gun KS-19
- 130 mm air defense gun KS-30
- AZP S-60 57 mm anti-aircraft gun
- ZPU dual or quad 14.5 mm anti-aircraft machine gun
- ZU-23-2 twin 23 mm anti-aircraft cannon

Self-propelled anti-aircraft guns

- ZSU-37
- ZSU-57-2 self-propelled twin 57 mm cannon
- ZSU-23-4 Shilka self-propelled quad 23 mm cannon
- ZSU-37-2 Yenisei self-propelled dual 37 mm cannons, main competitor of Shilka
- 2K22 Tunguska self-propelled twin 30 mm cannon

Anti-tank guns

- 37 mm anti-tank gun M1930 (1-K)
- 45 mm anti-tank gun M1932 (19-K)
- 45 mm anti-tank gun M1937 (53-K)
- 76 mm tank gun M1940 F-34
- 76 mm tank gun M1941 (ZiS-5)
- 45 mm anti-tank gun M1942 (M-42)
- 57 mm anti-tank gun M1943 (ZiS-2)
- ZiS-30
- 100 mm field gun M1944 (BS-3)
- SU-85
- D-10 tank gun
- 85 mm anti-tank gun D-48
- 100 mm anti-tank gun T-12
- Sprut anti-tank gun

Assault guns

- ASU-57 57 mm self-propelled gun
- ASU-85 85 mm self-propelled gun

Recoilless rifles

- RPG-2
- B-10 recoilless rifle
- B-11 recoilless rifle
- SPG-9

Mortars

- RM-38
- 152 mm mortar M1931 (NM)
- 107mm M1938 mortar
- M1938 mortar
- 160mm Mortar M1943
- M31, M68 82 mm mortar
- 82-BM-37
- 37mm spade mortar
- 82-PM-41
- 120-PM-43 mortar
- 240 mm mortar M240
- 2B11
- 2S12 Sani
- 2B14 Podnos

Mortar carriers

- 2S23 Nona-SVK – 120 mm
- 2S4 Tyulpan – 240 mm heavy self-propelled mortar

Assault guns

- SU-122
- SU-152
- ISU-152
- ISU-122
- SU-122-54

Field artillery

- 95 mm howitzer M1753 secret howitzer
- 6-inch siege gun M1877
- 76 mm divisional gun M1902
- 76 mm divisional gun M1902/30
- 6-inch siege gun M1904
- 37 mm trench gun M1915
- 305 mm howitzer M1915
- 76 mm divisional gun M1936 (F-22)
- 76 mm divisional gun M1939 (USV)
- 76 mm divisional gun M1942 (ZiS-3)
- 100 mm field gun M1944 (BS-3)
- 107 mm gun M1910
- 107 mm gun M1910/30
- 107 mm divisional gun M1940 (M-60)
- 122 mm howitzer M1909
- 122 mm howitzer M1910
- 122 mm howitzer M1910/30
- 122 mm howitzer M1909/37
- 122 mm gun M1931 (A-19)
- 122 mm gun M1931/37 (A-19)
- 122 mm howitzer M1938 (M-30)
- 152 mm howitzer M1909
- 152 mm howitzer M1909/30
- 152 mm siege gun M1910
- 152 mm gun M1910/30
- 152 mm gun M1910/34
- 152 mm howitzer M1910/37
- 152 mm gun M1935 (Br-2)
- 152 mm howitzer-gun M1937 (ML-20)
- 152 mm howitzer M1938 (M-10)
- 152 mm howitzer M1943 (D-1)
- 152 mm L/27 howitzer D-22 (2A33)
- D-74 122 mm field gun
- 152 mm towed gun-howitzer M1955 (D-20)
- 122 mm howitzer 2A18 (D-30)
- D-74 122 mm field gun
- M1938 M-30 122 mm howitzer
- M1954 M-46 130 mm gun
- 152 mm howitzer-gun M1937 (ML-20)
- 130 mm towed field gun M1954 (M-46)
- M1955 D-20 152 mm gun/howitzer
- M-389 155 mm gun
- 203 mm howitzer M1931 (B-4)
- S-23 180–203 mm gun
- 210 mm gun M1939 (Br-17)
- 305 mm howitzer M1939 (Br-18)
- 152 mm howitzer 2A65
- 2B16 Nona-K
- 2B9 Vasilek 82 mm gun-mortar
- 76 mm divisional gun M1933

Self-propelled artillery

- 2S7 Pion
- 2A36 Giatsint-B
- 2S3 Akatsiya
- 2A3 Kondensator 2P
- 2B1 Oka
- 130 mm coastal defense gun A-222

Rocket artillery

- Katyusha rocket launcher (BM-8, BM-13, BM-31)
- BM-14
- BM-21 Grad
- BM-24
- 2K6 Luna
- 9K52 Luna-M
- 9K57 Uragan 220 mm multiple rocket launcher
- 9K58 Smerch 300 mm multiple rocket launcher
- 9K59 Prima 122 mm multiple rocket launcher
- TOS-1 220mm multiple rocket launcher

== Russian Empire and Russian Federation ==
=== Russian Empire ===
- 37 mm McClean Automatic Cannon Mk. III
- 152 mm 45 caliber Pattern 1892

=== Post-Soviet Russian Federation ===
Anti-aircraft guns

- AZP S-60
- Derivatsiya-PVO 57mm anti-aircraft artillery system

Anti-tank guns

- 100 mm anti-tank gun T-12 2A19, 2A29 MT-12 Rapira
- 2S9 Nona 2B16
- Sprut anti-tank gun 2A45 Sprut-B 125 mm
- 2S25 Sprut-SD

Mortars

- 2B14-1 Podnos 82 mm mortar
- 2B16 Nona-K 120 mm gun/mortar
- 2B24
- 2B25
- 2K32

Mortar carriers

- 2S4 Tyulpan
- 2S31 Vena
- 2S42 Lotus
- Phlox 120mm self-propelled artillery
- Zauralets-D

Field artillery

- 2A6 152 mm howitzer
- 152 mm towed gun-howitzer M1955 (D-20)
- 2A18 D-30 122 mm howitzer
- 2A36 Giatsint-B 152 mm gun
- 2A65 MSTA-B 152 mm howitzer
- 2B16 Nona-K

Self-propelled artillery

- 2S1 Gvozdika/M1974 122 mm amphibious howitzer
- 2S3 Akatsiya/M1973: 152 mm self-propelled howitzer
- 2S4 Tyulpan 240 mm self-propelled mortar
- 2S5 Giatsint-S 152 mm self-propelled gun
- 2S7 Pion 203 mm self-propelled gun
- 2S7M Malka 203 mm self-propelled gun
- 2S9 Nona-S 120 mm self-propelled gun/mortar
- 2S12 Sani 120 mm mortar
- 2S19 MSTA-S 152 mm self-propelled howitzer
- 2S23 Nona-SVK 120 mm gun self-propelled gun/mortar
- 2S31 Vena 120 mm self-propelled gun
- 2S34 Hosta 120 mm
- Phlox 120mm self-propelled artillery
- Zauralets-D
- 2S35 Koalitsiya-SV 152.4mm

Rocket artillery

- 9K51 Grad 122 mm multiple rocket launcher
- 9K52 Luna-M
- 9K57 Uragan 220 mm multiple rocket launcher
- 9K58 Smerch 300 mm multiple rocket launcher
- TOS-1 220mm multiple rocket launcher
- 9A52-4 Tornado

== Spain ==
- S88-1 howitzer 155 mm
- M109 howitzer self-propelled 155 mm
- M110 howitzer self-propelled 203 mm
- L118 light gun 105 mm
- OTO Melara Mod 56 105 mm lightweight howitzer
- APU SBT 155 mm towed howitzer
- Teruel MRL

== Sri Lanka ==
Anti-aircraft guns

- QF 3.7 inch AA gun (Decommissioned)
- L40
- ZSU-23-2
- TCM-20

Mountain guns

- 76 mm mountain gun M48 – (ceremonial colour gun)

Mortars

- Type 84 (W84) 82 mm mortar
- Type 86 (W86) 120 mm mortar

Field artillery

- BL 12-pounder 6 cwt gun (Decommissioned)
- QF 25 pounder howitzer – (ceremonial gun battery)
- 122 mm Type 60 howitzer
- 130 mm Type 59 field gun
- 152 mm Type 66 gun-howitzer

Rocket artillery

- RM-70 multiple rocket launcher

Coastal artillery

- BL 6 inch Mk VII naval gun (decommissioned)
- BL 9.2-inch naval gun (decommissioned)

== Sweden ==
- M/40 Automatic cannon World War II 20 mm anti-aircraft and antitank gun
- Automatkanon m/45 World War II 20 mm aircraft gun
- Bofors 25 mm M/32 World War II 25 mm anti-aircraft gun
- Pansarvärnskanon m/34 Inter-war 37 mm antitank gun
- Pansarvärnskanon m/38 Inter-war 37 mm antitank gun
- Pansarvärnskanon m/39 m/40 World War II 37 mm antitank gun
- Bofors 40 mm automatic gun L/60 World War II 40 mm anti-aircraft gun primarily used outside Sweden
- Luftvärnsautomatkanon m/36 World War II 40 mm anti-aircraft gun
- Luftvärnsautomatkanon m/48 World War II 40 mm anti-aircraft gun
- Automatkanon m/47 World War II 57 mm aircraft gun
- Luftvärnsautomatkanon m/54 Cold War 57 mm anti-aircraft gun
- Pansarvärnskanon m/43 World War II 57 mm antitank gun
- Kanon m/05 Pre–World War I 75 mm naval gun
- Kanon m/40 World War II 75 mm gun
- Bergskanon L-20 Inter-war 75 mm pack gun
- Luftvärnskanon m/30 Inter-war 75 mm anti-aircraft gun
- Luftvärnskanon m/36 Inter-war 75 mm anti-aircraft gun
- Luftvärnskanon m/37 Inter-war 75 mm anti-aircraft gun
- Tornpjäs m/57 Cold War 75 mm fixed coastal artillery gun
- Haubits m/10 Pre–World War I 105 mm howitzer
- Bergshaubits m/10-24 Inter-war 105 mm pack howitzer
- Kanon m/27 Inter-war 105 mm gun
- Kanon m/34 Inter-war 105 mm gun
- Haubits m/39 World War II 105 mm howitzer
- Haubits m/40 World War II 105 mm howitzer
- Läderkanon 17th century experimental gun
- Luftvärnskanon m/42 World War II 105 mm anti-aircraft gun
- Haubits 4140 Cold War 105 mm howitzer
- Tornautomatpjäs m/50 Cold War 105 mm fixed coastal artillery gun
- Luftvärnsautomatkanon 4501 Cold War 120 mm anti-aircraft gun
- Fästningshaubits m/06 Pre–World War I 150 mm turret-mounted fortress howitzer
- Positionshaubits m/06 Pre–World War I 150 mm howitzer
- Haubits m/19 Inter-war 150 mm howitzer
- Haubits m/38 World War II 150 mm howitzer
- Kanon m/98B Pre–World War I 152 mm coast artillery gun
- Kustartilleripjäs m/37 World War II 152 mm coast artillery gun
- Kanon m/03 Pre–World War I 152 mm fortress artillery/coast artillery gun
- Kanon m/12 Pre–World War I 152 mm fortress artillery/coast artillery gun
- Kustartilleripjäs M/51 Cold War 152 mm coast artillery gun
- Tornautomatpjäs 12/70 Cold War 120 mm Fixed coast artillery gun
- Kustartilleripjäs 12/80 Cold War 120 mm mobile coast artillery gun
- Haubits F Cold War 155 mm howitzer
- Bandkanon 1 Cold War Self-propelled 155 mm gun
- Haubits FH77/A Cold War 155 mm howitzer
- Haubits FH77/B Cold War 155 mm howitzer
- Archer self-propelled 155 mm howitzer
- 21 cm kanon m/42 World War II mobile coast artillery gun
- Kanon m/92 Pre–World War I 240 mm coast defense gun
- Haubits m/94 Pre–World War I 240 mm coast defense howitzer
- Haubits m/16 World War I 305 mm (12 inch) coast artillery howitzer
- Regementskanon 17th century 3-pound cannon
- AT4
- Carl Gustaf 8.4 cm recoilless rifle
- Bofors 57 mm gun

== Switzerland ==
- 20 mm Oerlikon light AA gun
- Oerlikon GAI-BO1 light AA gun
- Skyshield 35 mm portable anti-aircraft gun and missile system.
- M109 155 mm self-propelled howitzer (PzHb 79/95 and PzHb 88/95 KAWEST).
- Mw 74 120 mm mortar.
- Mw 87 120 mm mortar.
- Oerlikon GDF

== Syria ==
Rocket artillery

- Khaibar-1
- Golan-1000

== Republic of China ==
Multiple rocket launcher

- Kung Feng VI – 117 mm tracked MLRS
- Thunderbolt-2000 – Wheeled MLRS

Field artillery

- M101 howitzer – 105 mm towed howitzer
- 155 mm Long Tom – 155 mm towed howitzer
- M114 howitzer – 155 mm towed howitzer
- M115 howitzer – 203 mm towed howitzer
- 240 mm howitzer M1 – 240mm Fixed/Towed howitzer

Self-propelled artillery

- M108 howitzer – 105 mm self-propelled howitzer
- M109 howitzer – 155 mm self-propelled howitzer
- M110 howitzer – 203 mm self-propelled howitzer

== Thailand ==
Mortars

- M121A1/A2 mortar 60 mm mortar
- M121A3 Commando mortar 60 mm mortar
- M221A2 mortar 81 mm mortar
- M132A1 mortar 120 mm mortar
- M361 ATMM 120mm Mortar

Field artillery

- Type 63 field gun 75 mm
- M618A2 105 mm towed howitzer
- GIAT LG1 (LG1 Mk.3) 105 mm towed howitzer
- M101 Mod 105 mm towed howitzer
- L119 105 mm howitzer
- M198 155 mm howitzer
- GHN-45 155 mm howitzer

Self-propelled field artillery

- M425 SPG 105 mm self-propelled howitzer
- M-71 Soltam SPG 155 mm self-propelled howitzer
- M109A5 155 mm self-propelled howitzer
- CAESAR 155 mm self-propelled howitzer
- ATMOS 2000 (M758 ATMG) 155mm

Multiple rocket launchers

- D11A Multi-Purpose multiple rocket launcher
- DTI-1 302 mm multiple rocket launcher
- DTI-1G 302 mm multiple rocket launcher
- DTI-2 122 mm multiple rocket launcher
- SR-4 122 mm multiple rocket launcher

== Turkey ==
Field artillery

- M101A1 : 830
- M114A1 : 535
- M115 203mm howitzer : 162
- M116
- M102
- Panter (howitzer) : 225

Self-propelled field artillery

- M52A1 : 362
- M44 self-propelled howitzer : 164
- M107 : 36
- M55 self-propelled howitzer : 159
- T-155 Fırtına : 240

Multiple rocket launchers

- M270 : 12
- T-300 Kasırga : 80
- RA 7040 : 24
- T-122 Sakarya : 130+
- T-107 MBRL : 100+
- TOROS 230
- TOROS 260

== United Kingdom ==
- QF 1-pounder pom-pom
- QF 3.7-inch AA gun
- 120 mm BAT recoilless rifle
- 1.59-inch breech-loading Vickers Q.F. gun, Mk II, commonly called the "Vickers-Crayford rocket gun," light field gun designed for infantry use in World War I, later adapted for use as an aircraft gun
- Ordnance QF 2 pounder early World War II anti-tank gun
- Ordnance QF 6 pounder World War II anti-tank gun
- Ordnance BL 12-pounder 7 cwt a turn of the century field gun, and basis for the development of the BL 15-pounder gun
- BL 12-pounder 6 cwt gun a variant of the BL 12-pounder 7 cw adapted for cordite propellant
- Ordnance QF 13 pounder World War I horse artillery & later anti-aircraft gun
- BL 15-pounder gun turn of the century field gun
- Ordnance BLC 15 pounder early World War I field gun (the BL 15-pounder gun adapted with a recoil buffer and recuperator similar to the 13-pounder)
- Ordnance QF 17 pounder World War II anti-tank & tank gun
- Ordnance QF 18 pounder World War I field gun
- Ordnance QF 25 pounder World War II gun/howitzer
- BL 4.5-inch medium field gun early World War II
- BL 5.5-inch medium gun
- BL 6-inch 30 cwt howitzer
- BL 6-inch 26 cwt howitzer
- QF 4.5-inch howitzer World War I field gun
- QF 4.7-inch Mk I – IV naval gun converted to use as field gun in Second Boer Wa, early WWI
- BL 5-inch howitzer early World War I field gun
- BL 60-pounder gun World War I, medium
- BL 5.5-inch medium gun World War II
- BL 6-inch Mk VII naval gun on traveling carriage, World War I
- BL 6-inch gun Mk XIX World War I, long range
- BL 6-inch 30 cwt howitzer World War I, medium
- BL 6-inch 26 cwt howitzer World Wars I & II, medium
- BL 7.2-inch howitzer early World War II, heavy
- BL 8-inch howitzer Mk I – V World War I, heavy using bored-out 6 inch naval gun barrel
- BL 8-inch howitzer Mk VI – VIII World Wars I & II, heavy
- BL 9.2-inch Mk I – VII naval gun family of black powder naval and coast defence, in service from 1881 to the end of World War I
- BL 9.2-inch Mk VIII naval gun designed for newer cordite propellants, first British wire-wound gun of this calibre
- BL 9.2-inch Mk IX – X naval gun rifled, used in successive marks from the 1880s for naval, railway, and coastal artillery; coastal served until 1956
- BL 9.2 inch Mk XI naval gun gun introduced in 1908 increased bore length of Mk X to increase velocity further, but was unsuccessful in service and phased out by 1920
- BL 9.2 inch howitzer World War I siege howitzer
- BL 12 inch howitzer World War I siege howitzer
- BL 15 inch howitzer World War I siege howitzer
- RML 6.3 inch howitzer Second Boer War howitzer
- FH-70 155 mm gun
- M777 155 mm howitzer
- L118 light gun 105 mm
- M119

Self-propelled artillery

- Bishop (artillery) self-propelled 25pdr
- M7 Priest self-propelled 105 mm gun
- Deacon (artillery) self-propelled 6pdr
- Sexton (artillery) self-propelled 25pdr
- FV433 Abbot SPG self-propelled 105 mm gun
- AS-90 155 mm self-propelled gun

Mortars

- Ordnance ML 4.2 inch mortar
- Stokes mortar

== United States ==
Anti-aircraft guns

- 37 mm Gun M1
- 3-inch Gun M1918
- 90 mm Gun M1/M2/M3
- 120 mm M1 gun
- 5"/25 caliber gun
- 5"/38 caliber gun
- M51 Skysweeper
- M167 VADS

Self-propelled anti-aircraft guns

- M19 multiple gun motor carriage
- M42 Duster
- T249 Vigilante
- M163 VADS

Anti-tank guns

- 37 mm Gun M3
- M50 Ontos

Tank destroyers

- M10 tank destroyer
- M18 Hellcat
- M36 tank destroyer

Mortars

- M1 mortar
- M2 mortar
- M2 4.2 inch mortar
- M29 mortar
- M30 mortar
- M120 120 mm mortar
- M224-60 mm mortar, in current US Army and Marine Corps service
- Dragon Fire 120 mm automated mortar

Mortar carriers

- M84 mortar carrier
- M106-self-propelled 107 mm mortar
- M1064 mortar carrier
- M1129 mortar carrier

Artillery

- Parrott rifle
- Rodman gun
- Dahlgren gun
- 75 mm gun M2–M6 M2, M3, M6
- M1841 mountain howitzer
- M3 howitzer lightweight 105 mm howitzer for airborne troops
- 3.2-inch gun M1897 pre-WWI field gun
- 3-inch M1902 field gun pre-WWI field gun
- 4.7 inch Gun M1906 pre-WWI field gun
- 6-inch howitzer M1908 pre-WWI howitzer
- 75 mm gun M1897A4, WWI-WWII era field gun, US-made version of French Canon de 75 modèle 1897
- 75 mm howitzer M1/M116, 1920s-Vietnam era pack howitzer
- 155 mm howitzer M1917 WWI-WWII era howitzer, a French Canon de 155 C modèle 1917 Schneider in US service
- 155 mm howitzer M1918 WWI-WWII era howitzer, US-made version of French Canon de 155 C modèle 1917 Schneider
- 155 mm gun M1918 WWI-WWII era field gun, US-made version of French Canon de 155mm GPF
- 8-inch howitzer M1917, WWI-era US-made versions of British BL 8-inch howitzer Mk VI – VIII
- 4.5-inch gun M1 WWII US field gun
- 105 mm M2A1 (M101A1) howitzer WWII US standard light field gun
- 105 mm M102 howitzer
- 155 mm gun M1, M2, M59 a WWII and Korea era field gun widely known as the Long Tom
- 8 inch howitzer M1 (M115) a towed, used by United States Army
- 8-inch gun M1 a WWII era 203 mm towed heavy gun
- M1918 240 mm howitzer WWI-WWII era siege gun derived from French Mortier de 280 modèle 1914 Schneider
- 240 mm howitzer M1 WWII era towed howitzer
- 155 mm M114/howitzer M1 a WWII–1980s-era towed howitzer used by the United States Army
- M198 155 mm howitzer
- M119 howitzer a lightweight British 105 mm howitzer also used by the United States Army
- M777 155 mm medium howitzer

Self-propelled artillery

- T92 howitzer motor carriage experimental self-propelled 240 mm howitzer
- howitzer motor carriage M8 self-propelled 75 mm pack howitzer
- M12 gun motor carriage self-propelled 155 mm M1918 gun
- M40 gun motor carriage self-propelled 155 mm M2 gun
- M42 Duster self-propelled twin 40 mm anti-aircraft cannon
- M44 self-propelled howitzer 155 mm
- M52 self propelled howitzer 105 mm
- M55 self propelled howitzer 155 mm
- M107 self-propelled gun 175 mm (6.9")
- M108 howitzer self-propelled 105 mm
- M109 howitzer self-propelled 155 mm
- XM2001 Crusader self-propelled 155 mm howitzer, proposed then cancelled
- M1299 self-propelled 155 mm howitzer prototype based on M109
- M55 howitzer self-propelled 203 mm (8") T108
- M110 howitzer self-propelled 203 mm
- M125 self-propelled 81 mm
- M163 Vulcan self-propelled 20 mm Vulcan Gatling cannon

Nuclear artillery

- M65 atomic cannon 280 mm

Recoilless rifles

- M18 recoilless rifle
- M20 recoilless rifle
- M27 recoilless rifle
- M40 recoilless rifle
- M67 recoilless rifle
- Davy Crockett (nuclear device)

Rocket artillery

- M16 (rocket)
- M270 multiple launch rocket system self-propelled loader/launcher
- M1064 mortar carrier self-propelled 120 mm
- XM70E2 towed 115mm multiple rocket launcher
- MGR-1 Honest John nuclear-capable rocket
- HIMARS self-propelled Multiple Launch Rocket System (MLRS)
- Long Range Precision Fires (LRPF).

Coastal artillery

- 3-inch gun M1903
- 5-inch gun M1897
- 6-inch gun M1897
- 8-inch M1888
- 8-inch Mk. VI railway gun
- 10-inch gun M1895
- 12-inch coast defense mortar
- 12-inch gun M1895
- 14-inch gun M1907
- 14-inch M1920 railway gun
- 16-inch gun M1895
- 16-inch gun M1919
- 16-inch howitzer M1920
- 16"/50 caliber Mark 2 gun

== United Arab Emirates ==
Rocket artillery

- Jobaria Defense Systems Multiple Cradle Launcher

Mortar carriers

- RG-31 Agrab; mortar carrier version of RG-31 Nyala with SRAMS (Super Rapid Advanced Mortar System).

== Vietnam ==
Howitzer

- PTH85D44-VN18
- PTH105-VN15 M3

Self-propelled artillery

- PTH 130-K255B

== Yugoslavia – passed to successor states ==
- UB M-52 120 mm mortar
- M-63 Plamen
- RAK-12
- M-71 Partizan rocket launcher single-tube 128 mm
- M-77 Oganj self-propelled 32 tube 128 mm
- M-87 Orkan 12-tube 262 mm self-propelled multiple rocket launcher

== See also ==
- List of artillery
- List of artillery by name
- List of artillery by type
- List of the largest cannon by caliber
- List of medieval and early modern gunpowder artillery
- List of siege artillery
