= M50 Ontos =

American tank destroyer/self propelled gun(s)

Rifle, Multiple 106 mm, Self-propelled, M50 "Ontos"
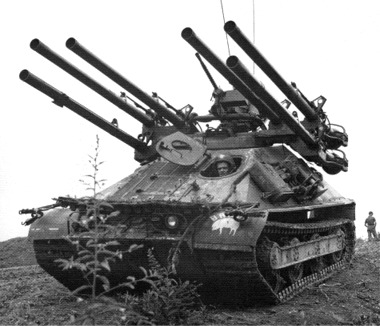
- Ontos M50A1. The 50-cal spotting rifles can be seen on the upper guns
- Type: Tank destroyer
- Place of origin: United States

Service history
- In service: 1956–69
- Used by: United States
- Wars: 1958 Lebanon Crisis; Dominican Civil War; Vietnam War

Production history
- Designer: Allis-Chalmers
- Designed: 1952
- Manufacturer: Allis-Chalmers
- Produced: 1955–57
- No. built: 297
- Variants: See variants

Specifications
- Mass: 8,600 kg (19,000 lb)
- Length: 3.83 m (12 ft 7 in)
- Width: 2.59 m (8 ft 6 in)
- Height: 2.13 m (7 ft 0 in)
- Crew: 3 (driver, gunner and loader)
- Sights: x6 .50 Single-Shot Spotting Rifles
- Main armament: 6 × M40A1C recoilless rifles
- Secondary armament: 1 × .30 (7.62 mm) M1919 Browning machine gun
- Engine: GM 6-cylinder inline 302 cu in (4.95 L) gasoline engine 145 hp (108 kW)
- Operational range: 185 km (115 mi)
- Maximum speed: 48 km/h (30 mph)

Ontos, officially the Rifle, Multiple 106 mm, Self-propelled, M50, was an American light armored tracked anti-tank vehicle developed in the 1950s.

It mounted six 106 mm manually loaded M40 recoilless rifles as its main armament, which could be fired in rapid succession against single targets to increase the probability of a kill. Although the actual caliber of the main guns was 105 mm, it was designated 106 mm to prevent confusion with the ammunition for the 105 mm M27 recoilless rifle, which the M40 replaced.

It was produced in limited numbers for the United States Marine Corps after the United States Army cancelled the project. The Marines consistently reported excellent results when they used the Ontos for direct fire support against infantry in numerous battles and operations during the Vietnam War. The American stock of Ontos was largely expended towards the end of the conflict and the Ontos was removed from service in 1969.

== Development ==
The Ontos (Greek for "thing") project was created to be an air transportable tank destroyer capable of being lifted by the cargo aircraft of the 1950s. This limited the vehicle to a weight between 10 and 20 metric tons. The Ontos also had to use the six-cylinder engine then widely used in the Army's GMC trucks. After a number of design and engineering meetings from March through October 1951, manufacturer Allis-Chalmers was awarded an initial contract to produce 14 pilot vehicles, encompassing 6 variants.

Allis-Chalmers' first vehicle, completed in 1952, was based on the running gear of the M56 Scorpion light anti-tank vehicle. The vehicle mounted a cast steel turret with two arms holding three rifles each. This early model could traverse the turret only about 15 degrees. A second prototype used a new suspension system, new tracks, and a newer turret with about 40 degrees traverse. The vehicle could carry only eighteen rounds for the main guns inside the vehicle due to limited space. Its most prominent armament was its six M40 recoilless rifles. Four of the recoilless rifles also had .50 BAT (12.7x77mm) M8C spotting rifles attached, each of which fired a tracer round with the same trajectory as the 105 mm round, and which gave off a flash and puff of white smoke on impact. The spotting rifles were used to line up the 105 mm recoilless rifles with the target. The Ontos also carried a single .30 caliber (7.62 mm) M1919A4 machine gun for anti-infantry use.

The vehicle was taken to the Aberdeen Proving Ground where single rifles had been tested earlier. When all six weapons were fired at once, the back blast from the firing knocked bricks out of a nearby building and knocked the rear windows out of several cars. The prototype and testing stage was completed by 1955, at which point the Army canceled its order.

As an anti-tank vehicle the Ontos had several problems, including a small ammunition load, a very high profile for such a small vehicle, and the need for the crew to exit the vehicle in order to reload the guns, exposing them to enemy fire. Although the Army had canceled its order, the Marine Corps was desperate for any anti-tank vehicles it could get, and ordered 297. Production ran from 1955 through 1957. The Marine Corps accepted its first vehicle on 31 October 1956.

== Variants ==
- T164 − Prototype armed with four rifles
- T165 − Prototype armed with six rifles. In January 1955, an improved version was officially designated as the T165E2, which would be further refined into the Ontos
- T166 − Prototype armed with a single rifle
- T167 − Prototype armed with eight rifles
- M50 "Ontos" − First production variant powered by a General Motors Model 302 145 hp (108 kW) engine. 297 were built in total
- M50A1 − Improved variant powered by Chrysler Model 75-M2 180 hp (130 kW) engine later designated as the HT-361. Other modifications included the addition of vent grills on the lower hull front. 294 vehicles were converted in total

During development, the feasibility of troop carriers using the Ontos chassis was examined. A mockup was built of an Ontos chassis with a Maxson M45 quadmount .50 BMG antiaircraft mount. There were also some projects to modernize the M50 with anti-tank missiles.

== Service ==
While the M50 was designed as a tank destroyer, during the Vietnam War most M50s did not engage enemy armor as the North Vietnamese Army deployed few tanks. The Ontos was therefore more widely used by the US Marines for direct fire support for the infantry in combat, a role that was never emphasized in training or doctrine. Its light armor was effective against small arms but vulnerable to mines and rocket-propelled grenades. Consequently, many Ontos were deployed in static defense positions.

The relatively light weight of the M50 made it exceptionally mobile for the amount of firepower it carried. In one operation, the Ontos was the only tracked vehicle light enough to cross a pontoon bridge. In the Battle of Huế, Colonel Stanley S. Hughes felt the Ontos was the most effective of all Marine supporting arms. At ranges of 300 to 500 yards (270 to 460 m), its recoilless rifles could knock holes in or completely knock down walls. The appearance of an Ontos was sometimes enough to make the enemy break and run, and anecdotal accounts describe the enemy fleeing occupied buildings when an Ontos's spotting round entered a window. In Operation Desoto, the introduction of the large CH-53 Sea Stallion helicopter made possible moving a platoon 25 miles (40 km) south of Quảng Ngãi City carrying Ontos in slings underneath the aircraft.

The Ontos was taken out of frontline service in 1969, and by 1970 were removed entirely from service. Some of the vehicles were handed over to an Army light infantry brigade. They used them until they ran out of spare parts, and then removed the turrets and used them as fixed fortifications. Both these and the rest of the vehicles returned from Vietnam in 1970 and were cut up for scrap, with some of the chassis being sold off to be converted into construction vehicles. Some of the Ontos that were sold to construction companies were later acquired by collectors for restoration.

The Ontos did see use as an anti-tank weapon during the American involvement in the Dominican Civil War: on 29 April 1965 an M50 Ontos and an M48 Patton of the 6th MEU engaged and destroyed two rebel L/60L light tanks, each destroying one. In another instance, an Ontos destroyed an AMX-13.

== Preserved vehicles on display ==
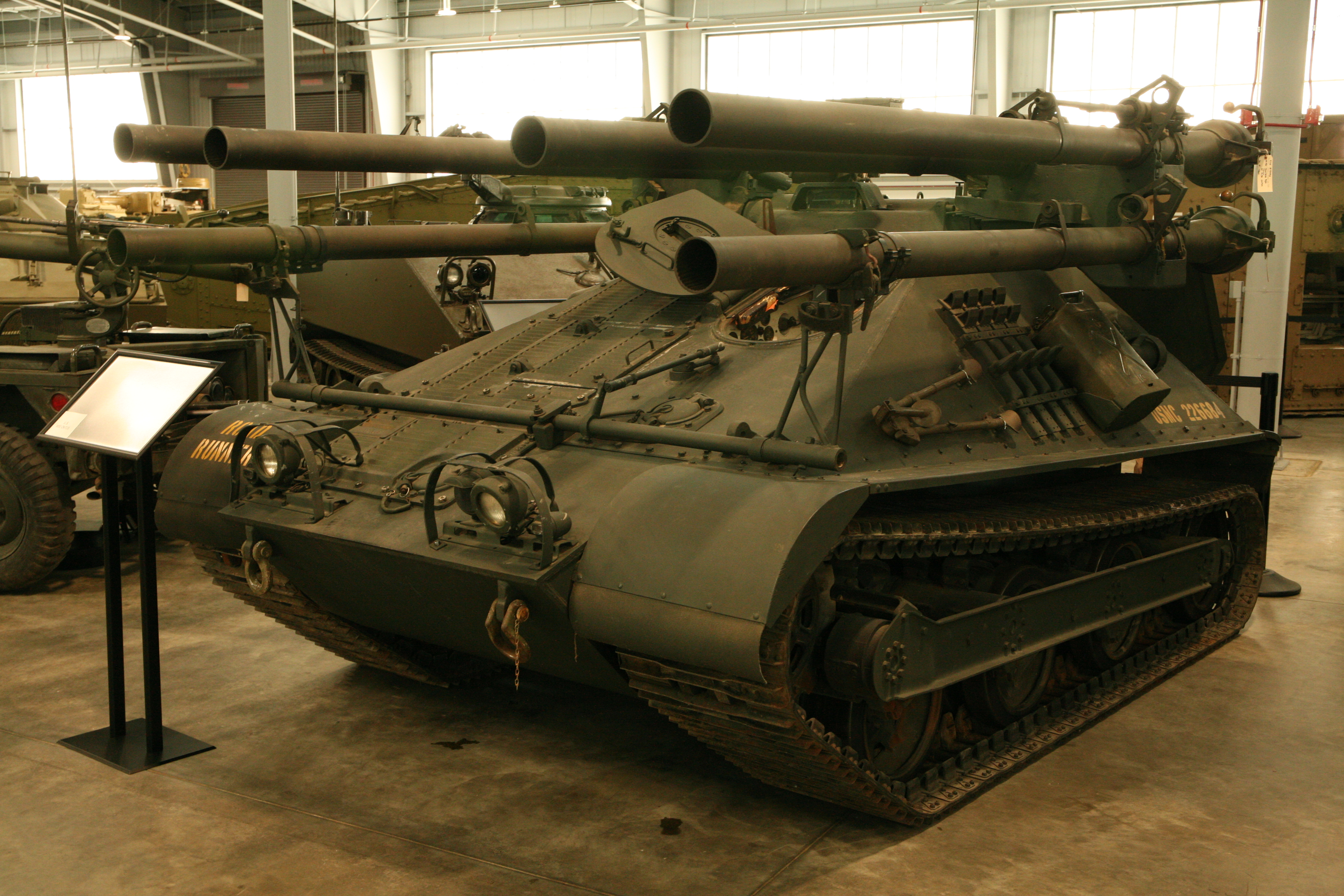
M50 Ontos at the U.S. Army Armor & Cavalry Collection, Fort Benning (now Fort Moore), Georgia, in 2023

Of the 297 built, only 14 remain, many of which are the M50A1 model.

There are Ontos on display at the following US locations:

- The Patton Museum of Cavalry & Armor in Fort Knox, Kentucky (no longer on display, may have moved with the Armor school to Fort Benning).
- The Rock Island Arsenal Museum in Rock Island, Illinois.
- Camp Atterbury, Edinburgh, Indiana.
- The American Military Museum, in El Monte, California has an M50 that is missing its six recoilless rifles.
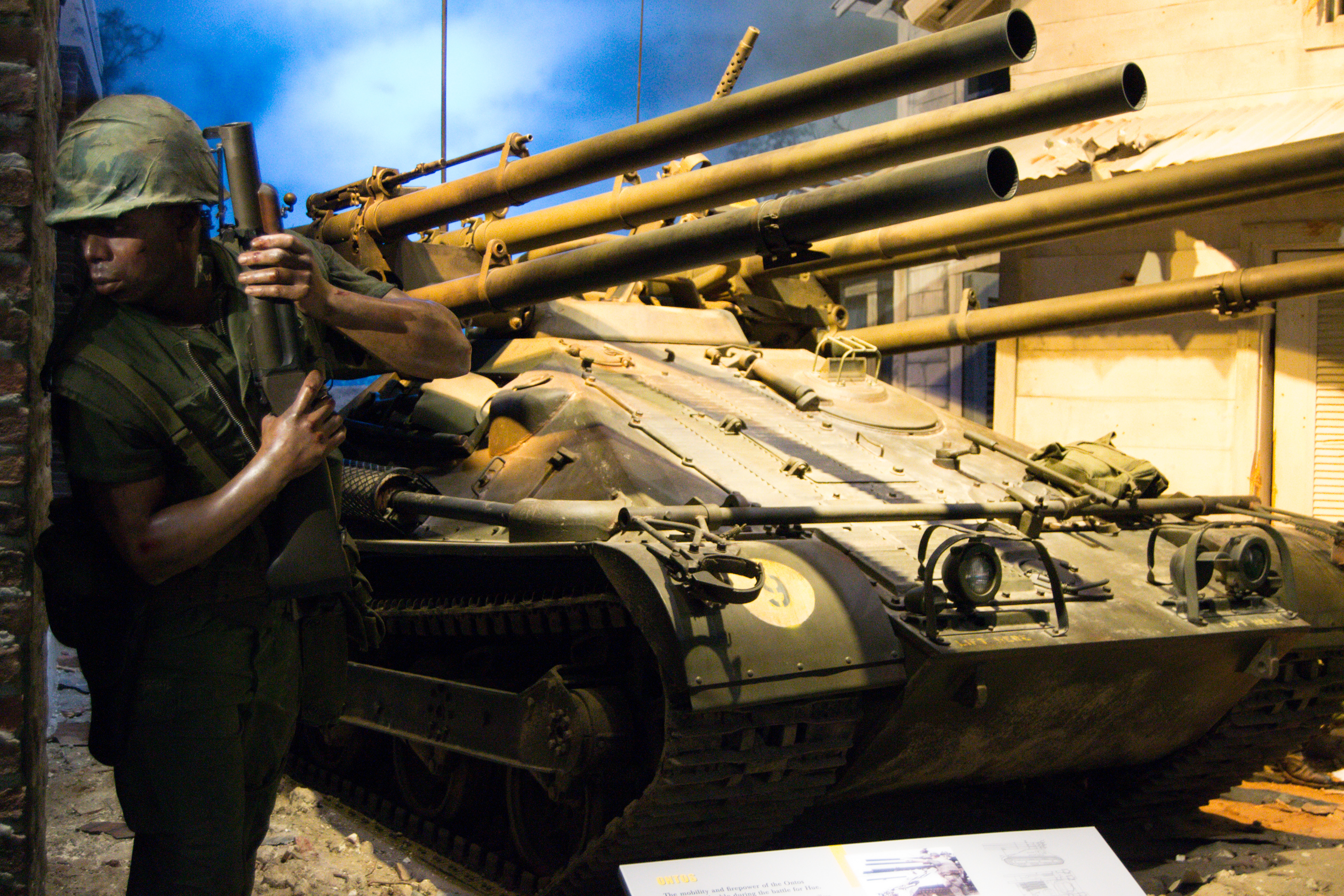
  * An M50A1 Ontos on display at the National Museum of the United States Marine Corps in Quantico, Virginia.
- The Aberdeen Proving Ground's Museum in Aberdeen, Maryland has a T165E2, the 19th prototype, though it is not currently on display. The vehicle is currently undergoing a cosmetic restoration.
- Fred Ropkey, owner of the Ropkey Armor Museum in Crawfordsville, Indiana owns the first prototype T165, a later model Ontos, and a parts machine.
- The National Museum of the Marine Corps in Quantico, Virginia has M50A1 registration number 226837 on exhibit.
- The Museum of The Marine in Jacksonville, North Carolina has an operational M50A1 Ontos which is not on public display.
- There is an M50A1 Ontos on outside display at the Navy Facility at China Lake, California.
- The Marine Corps Air Ground Combat Center Twentynine Palms, California has M50A1 Ontos r/n 226806 on outdoor display.
- The Military Vehicle Technology Foundation in Portola Valley, California has a T165E1 prototype with the original GM 302ci engine which is currently undergoing a complete operational restoration, and a second prototype T165E2 Ontos.
- The Marine Corps Mechanized Museum, Camp Pendleton, displays a M50A1 Ontos that took part in the Battle of Hue.
- There is an M50 Ontos on display inside of the National Museum of Military Vehicles in the Vietnam exhibit, near Dubois, Wyoming
- Russell Military Museum in Zion, Illinois.
- The Museum of the American GI in College Station, Texas has one undergoing restoration.
- Indiana Military Museum, Vincennes, Indiana.

== See also ==
- List of artillery
- List of self-propelled anti-tank guns
- List of artillery of the United States
- G-numbers (SNL G288)

Similar vehicles

- Type 60 self-propelled 106 mm recoilless rifle

== Sources ==
- Estes, Kenneth W (2016). M50 Ontos and M56 Scorpion 1956–70: US Tank Destroyers of the Vietnam War. New Vanguard 240. Osprey Publishing. ISBN 9781472814739.
- Kutta, Timothy J., "ONTOS: The USMC's Most Famous Anti-Tank Weapon", Modern War magazine, no. #14 November/December 2014, Bakersfield, California: Strategy & Tactics Press (Decision Games), pp. 72–75
- McNab, Chris (2003). Military Vehicles. Hoo, Kent, UK: Grange Books. p. 56. ISBN 1-84013-539-5.
- "FMFM 9-3 - Antimechanized Operations (United States Marine Corps)" (PDF), Defense Technical Information Center, pp. 228–229, 13 July 1965
- Crismon, Fred (1992). U.S. Military Tracked Vehicles
- Zaloga, Steven J. (2024). US Battle Tanks 1946–2025. Bloomsbury Publishing. ISBN 978-1-4728-6569-4."
