= Type 83 =

Type 83 may refer to:

- Type 83 destroyer, a planned class of destroyers for the Royal Navy
- Type 83 SPH, a Chinese 152mm self-propelled howitzer
- Type 83 122 mm howitzer, a Chinese 122mm towed howitzer
- Type 83 rifle, a rifle issued in Thailand in the 1940s
