= Rheinmetall LTA2 =

German 105 mm tank gun

The Rheinmetall LTA2 is a 105 mm tank gun produced by the German defense firm Rheinmetall. At one point it was the primary armament of the Argentinian Tanque Argentino Mediano (TAM) medium tank.

== See also ==
- List of artillery
- Germany
