= List of artillery by type =

This list of artillery catalogues types of weapons found in batteries of national armed forces' artillery units.

Some weapons used by the infantry units, known as infantry support weapons, are often misidentified as artillery weapons because of their use and performance characteristics, sometimes known colloquially as the "infantryman's artillery" which has been particularly applied to mortars.

This list does not differentiate between guns and cannons, although some designations use one word or the other. The word "cannon" is of Latin origin, borrowed into the English language from the French, while "gun" appears to be of German language origin and is found in earlier use in England. There is almost universal use of gunner in the English language to refer to artillery personnel, and not the French term cannonier. Some English speaking armies do use the originally French term bombardier as a rank in artillery units.

== Vehicle guns ==
=== Aircraft artillery ===
Aircraft artillery has been used since the first world war.

=== Naval artillery ===
Naval guns are manufactured based on the same principles as the land based artillery ordnance, but differ significantly in system design and use. Never referred to as "artillery" it is however often called upon to provide naval artillery fire support to the land forces operation in the coastal region within their range.

=== Railway artillery ===
Railway artillery involved large guns and howitzers mounted and transported on specially-constructed railway cars.

== Mortars ==
=== Heavy mortars ===
Heavy mortars are large-caliber mortars designed to fire a relatively heavy shell on a high angle trajectory. Such weapons have a relatively short range, but are usually less complex than similar caliber field artillery.

This category includes the "Trench Mortars" of World War I which were all too heavy and cumbersome, and hence lacked the mobility, to be classed as infantry mortars.

== Field artillery ==
=== Self-propelled infantry guns ===
Infantry guns are designed to provide direct organic support for infantry forces. They fire a range of shells, primarily in a direct-fire mode. Most are lightweight and capable of being manhandled for limited mobility to accompany infantry.

=== Mountain artillery ===
Mountain artillery, which includes pack howitzers, mountain howitzers and mountain guns, is designed to accompany mountain infantry forces. Usually lightweight and designed to be broken down to be portable by pack animals or even soldiers, they often are in limited calibers with low muzzle energy. Correspondingly, range and anti-armor capabilities are limited. However, they can deliver useful firepower in locations that may be inaccessible to heavier support forces.

=== Self-propelled field guns ===
Field guns are one of two primary types of field artillery. Guns fire a heavy shell on a relatively level trajectory from a longer barrel, allowing for very high muzzle velocity and good range performance. Guns are most adequate for providing long range fire support and counter-battery fire.

=== Self-propelled howitzers ===
Howitzers are one of two primary types of field artillery. Howitzers fire a heavy shell in a high trajectory from a relatively short barrel. Range is limited but howitzers are slightly more mobile than similarly sized field guns.

==== Wheeled self-propelled howitzer ====
It is a sub-category of self-propelled howitzers, where the artillery gun is mounted on a wheeled vehicle, usually a 8×8 or 10×10 APC, or 6×6, 8×8, 10×10 trucks.

==== Tracked self-propelled howitzer ====
It is a sub-category of self-propelled howitzers, where the artillery gun is mounted on a tracked vehicle.

=== Siege artillery ===
Siege artillery are heavy guns and other bombardment devices designed to bombard fortifications, cities, and other fixed targets. They are capable of firing heavy shells but require enormous transport and logistical support to operate. They lack mobility and thus are rarely useful in more mobile warfare situations.

== See also ==
- List of artillery by country
- List of artillery by name
- List of World War II artillery
- List of naval guns
- List of weapons
- List of tank main guns
- List of Grenade Launchers
- List of recoilless rifles
- Glossary of British ordnance terms
