= Type 87 mortar =

Type 87
- Type: Mortar
- Place of origin: China

Service history
- Used by: See users

Production history
- Designer: Norinco
- Designed: 1987
- Manufacturer: Norinco

Specifications
- Mass: 27kg (without sight)
- Length: 1400mm
- Caliber: 82 mm
- Elevation: +45 to +85°
- Traverse: 4° left and right
- Rate of fire: 20 rounds/min
- Effective firing range: 120 m to 5.6 km (standard rounds), 6 km (special rounds)
- References: "W87". WEAPONSYSTEMS.NET. WEAPONSYSTEMS.NET. "Light Mortar Model W87". CHINA JING AN IMPORT & EXPORT CORP. CHINA JING AN IMPORT & EXPORT CORP.

The Type 87 82mm Mortar is a Chinese infantry mortar developed by Norinco in 1987. It is a replacement for the older Type 67 82mm mortar used at the battalion level. An 81 mm version called the W87 was also developed for export markets.

== Variants ==
- Type 87: basic model 82 mm.
- W87: 81mm caliber model for export.
- The Type 87 mortar is also used on the YW304 variant of the Type 85 AFV

== Operators ==
- Bangladesh
- China
- Sri Lanka
- Vietnam
