= Type 66 howitzer =

Type 66
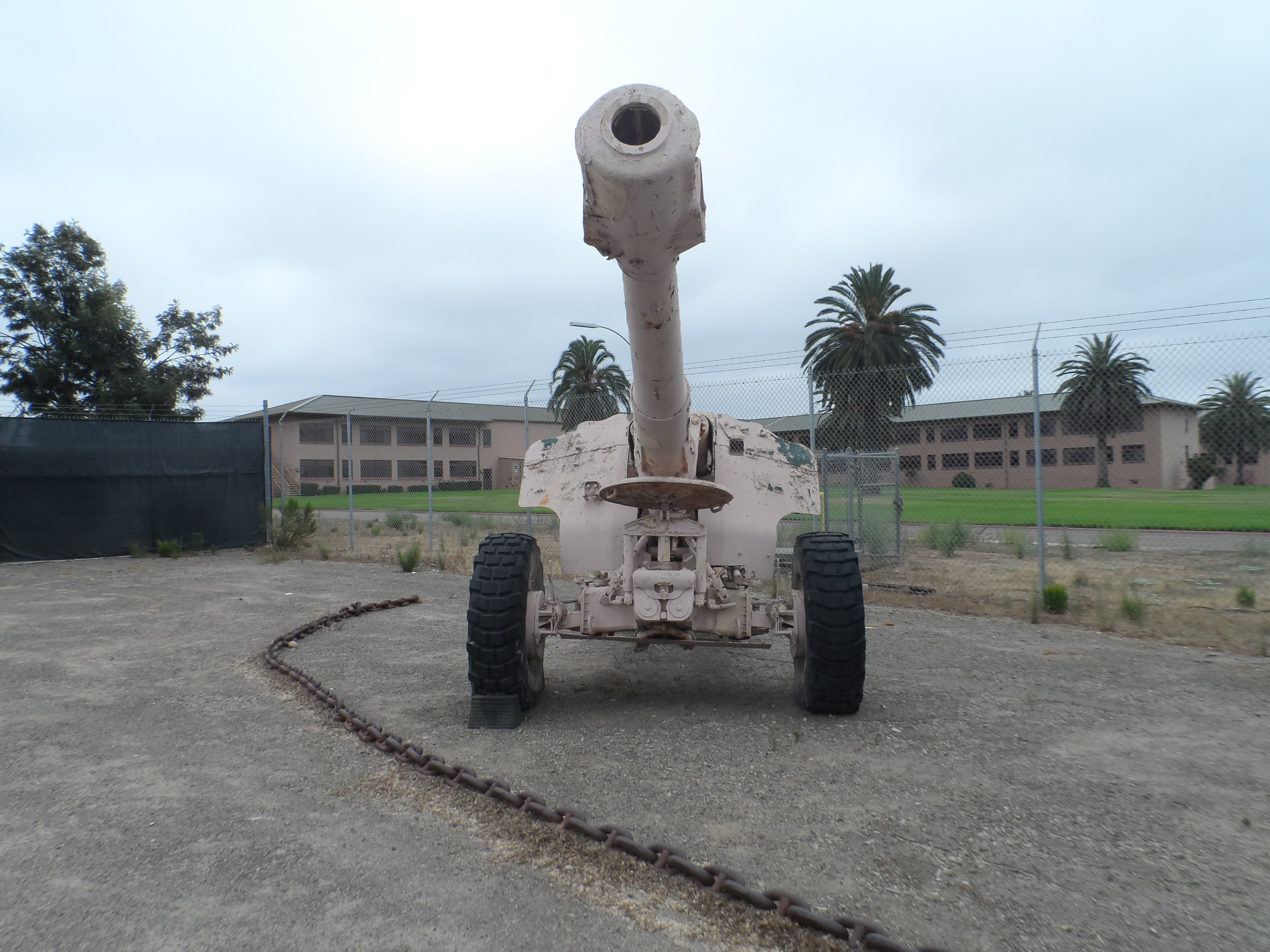
- On display at the Flying Leatherneck Aviation Museum
- Type: Gun-howitzer
- Place of origin: China

Service history
- In service: Sino-Vietnamese War; Sino-Vietnamese conflicts (1979–1991); Sri Lankan Civil War; Gulf War
- Used by: See operators

Production history
- Manufacturer: Norinco

Specifications
- Mass: 5,720 kg (12,610 lb)
- Length: 8.69 m (28.5 ft)
- Width: 2.42 m (7 ft 11 in)
- Height: 2.52 m (8 ft 3 in)
- Crew: 12
- Caliber: 152.4 mm (6.00 in)
- Action: Vertical sliding block
- Carriage: Split trail
- Elevation: +45°/-5°
- Traverse: 58°
- Rate of fire: 8 rpm
- Maximum firing range: 17,230 m (18,840 yd)
- Sights: Panoramic, telescopic

The Type 66 is a 152 mm towed howitzer used by the People's Liberation Army of China. The gun system is developed from the Soviet D-20 towed artillery. In addition to conventional shells the gun is capable of firing Type MP-152 rocket-assisted projectiles. In some cases a gun-shield is fitted but this is not universal.

== Design ==
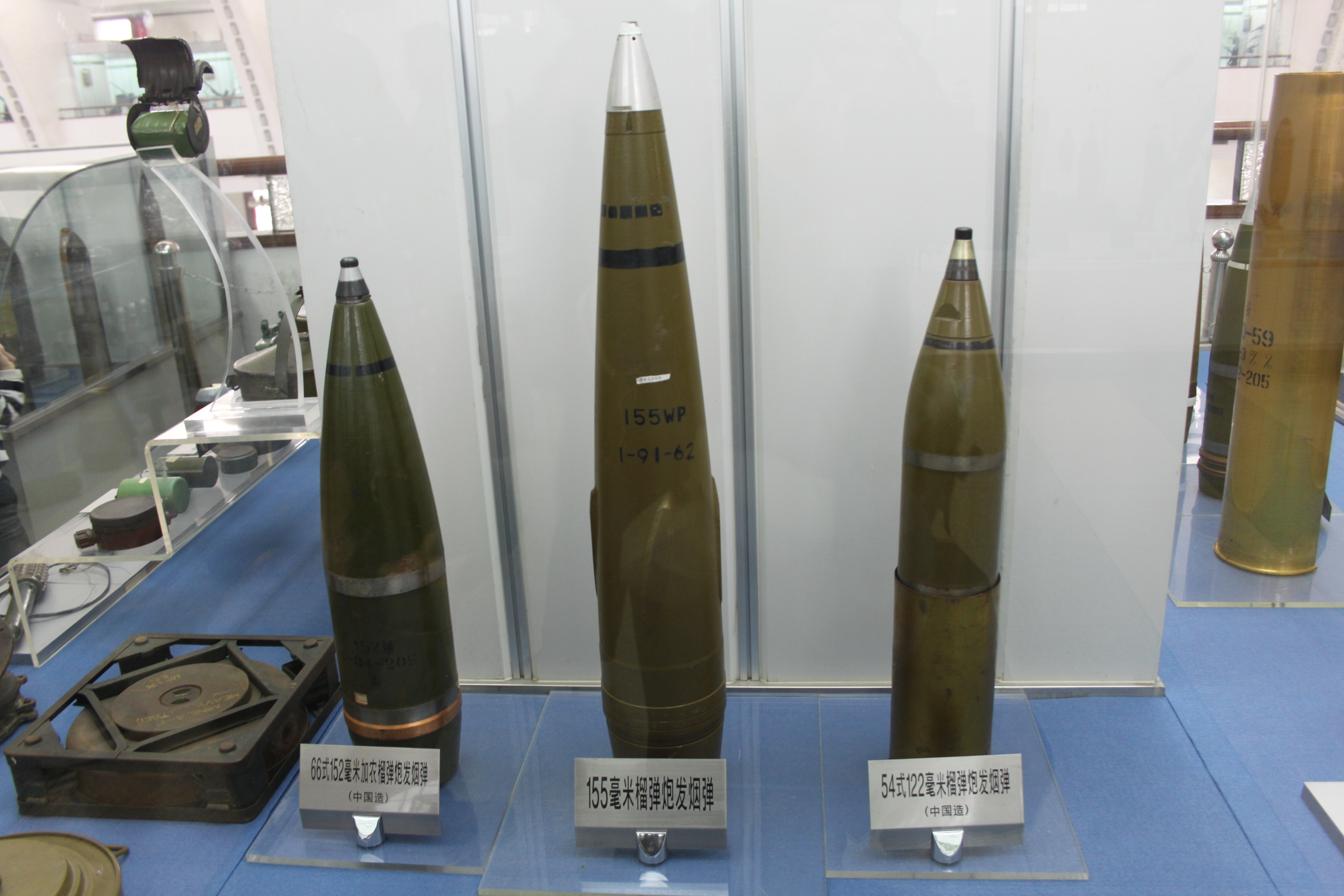
152mm smoke round used on the Type 66 (left), in comparison to the 155mm smoke round (middle) and the 122mm smoke round (right)

The Type 66 152 mm (6.0 in) gun-howitzer is a Chinese copy of the Soviet D-20 gun-howitzer built by Norinco, with a few minor differences in appearance. It has a distinctive thick, stocky barrel with a large muzzle brake.

The Type 66 is usually towed by a 6×6 truck at speeds at up to 60 km/h (37 mph). The split trail carriage features a Type 58 panoramic sight with a ×3.7 magnification power and a 10° field of view, a Type 58 collimator, and a Type 66 telescopic sight with a magnification power of ×5.5 and an 11° field of view. The carriage also have a castor wheel mounted on each trail to help the crew deploy the gun. When in firing position, these castor wheels rest on top of each trail, while a circular firing jack and two spades (one on each trail leg) provide support for the gun.

The Type 66 can fire High-explosive (HE), Smoke, and Illuminating shells using a variable six-charge bag propellant system. It can also fire the Type MP-152 rocket-assisted projectile (RAP) shell to provide extended range. The Chinese claim that the RAP round accuracy is the same of conventional projectiles. It can also fire precision-guided munitions, though their availability is limited.

While the Type 66 is somewhat obsolete compared to modern artillery, it is a simple and robust system capable of operating under severe conditions with minimal maintenance support, and when "employed competently and in mass, it can still deliver decisive firepower", according to the United States Army sources.

== Versions ==
- Type 83 SPH − Tracked self-propelled gun-howitzer based on the Type 66. According to US Army sources, it's a Type 66 mated to a generic Soviet armoured fighting vehicle chassis.

== Operators ==
=== Current ===
- China − 500 in service with the PLA as of 2024
- Sri Lanka − 46 in service as of 2024

=== Former ===
- Albania − 18 in service in 2011
- Bolivia − 18 delivered in 1992
- Iraq − Used during the Gulf War
- Liberation Tigers of Tamil Eelam − 9

== Gallery ==
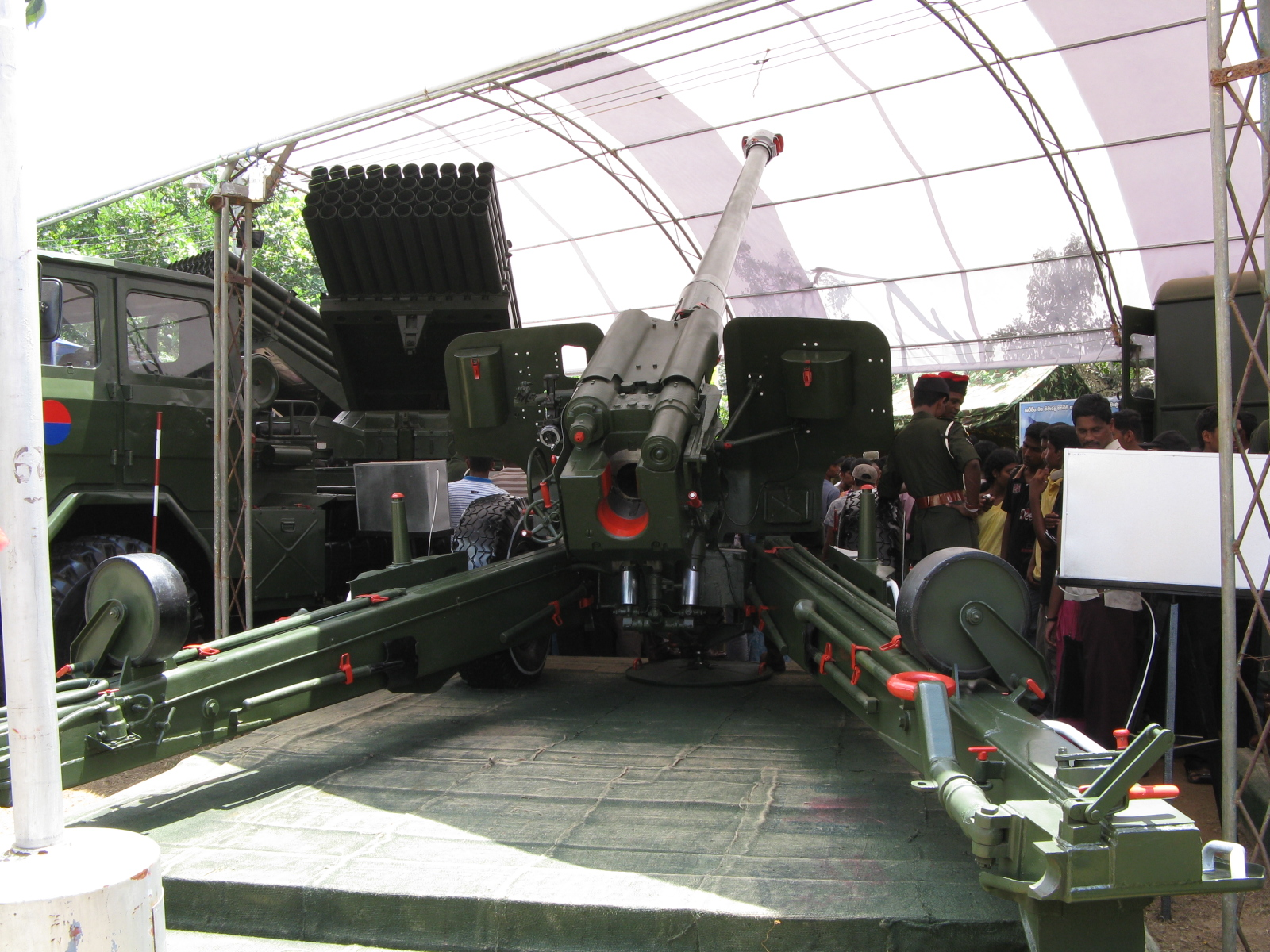
In Sri Lanka military service.

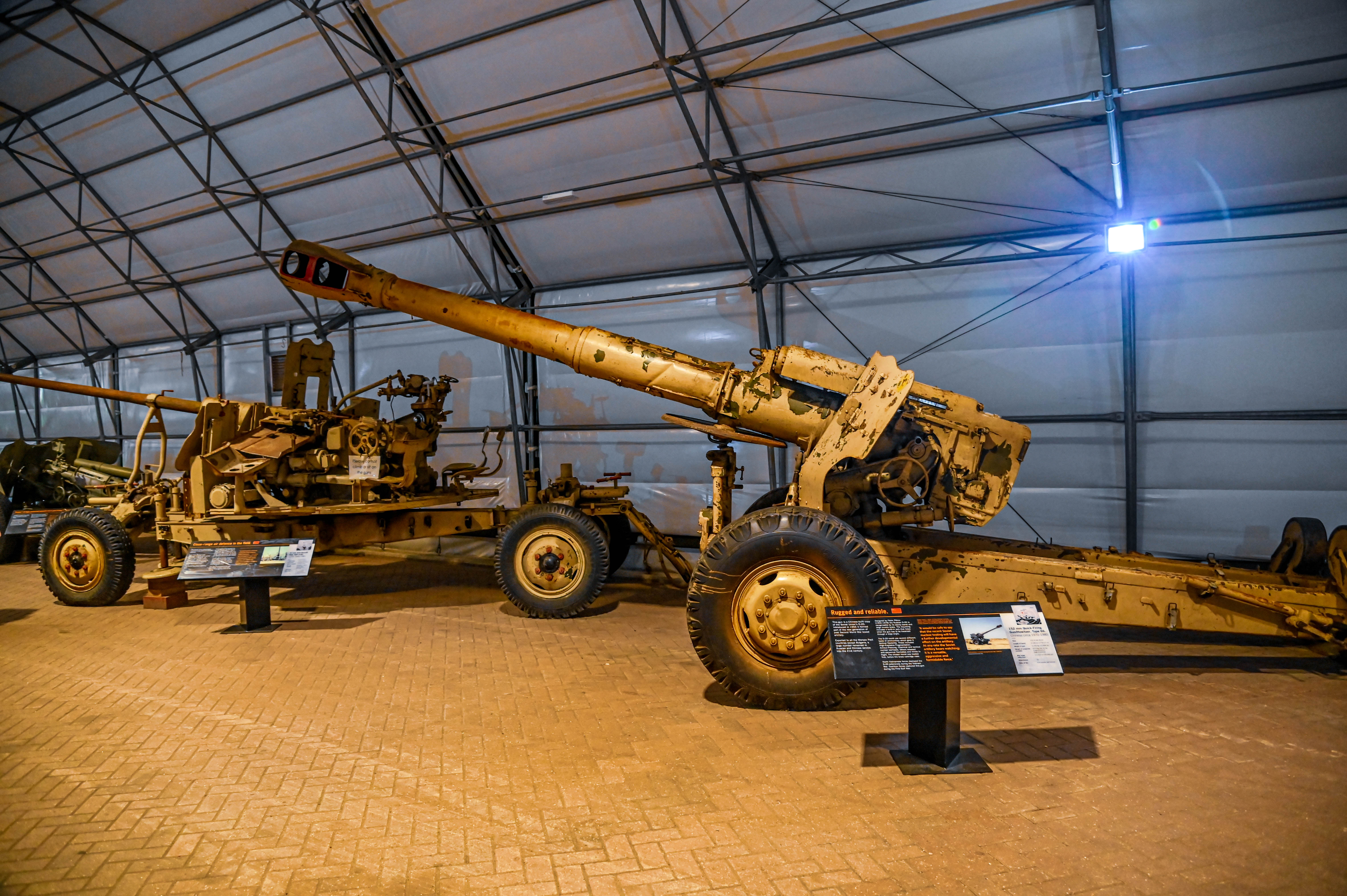
An ex-Iraqi gun captured during the Gulf War on display at the Royal Armouries.
