= Type 60 122 mm field gun =

Type 60
- Type: Field gun
- Place of origin: China

Service history
- Used by: See Users
- Wars: Vietnam War; Cambodian Civil War; Sino-Soviet border conflict Indo-Pakistani War of 1965; Six-Day War; Sino-Indian War; Sino-Vietnamese War; Yom Kippur War; Sri Lankan civil war

Specifications
- Mass: 5,620 kg (12,390 lb)
- Length: N/A
- Crew: 7–9
- Caliber: 122 mm (4.8 in)
- Breech: Horizontal sliding-wedge
- Carriage: Type 60
- Elevation: +45/−5 degree
- Traverse: +/−29 degree
- Rate of fire: Intense 8–10 rounds/min
- Muzzle velocity: 885 m/s (2,900 ft/s)
- Effective firing range: 23.9 km (14.9 mi) (indirect); 1,080 m (1,180 yd) (direct)
- Maximum firing range: 24 km (15 mi)

The Type 60 122mm towed gun is the Soviet D-74 122mm gun produced by the Chinese under licence. Developed in the late 1950s, it provided direct fire and indirect fire for the People's Liberation Army (PLA). It remains in service with reserve units in gun battalions attached to motorized infantry and armoured divisions. It is in active service with the Sri Lankan Army, introduced in the early 1990s to replace the Ordnance QF 25 pounder field gun. It has seen action in the Sri Lankan civil war.

== Wars ==
- Sino-Vietnamese War
- Vietnam War
- Cambodian Civil War
- Cambodian–Vietnamese War
- Sino-Soviet border conflict
- Indo-Pakistani War of 1965
- Six-Day War
- Sino-Indian War
- Yom Kippur War
- Sri Lankan civil war

== Users ==
- Cambodia
- China – in reserve
- Democratic Republic of the Congo
- Egypt
- Iran
- Sri Lanka
- Sudan
- Zimbabwe

=== Former users ===
- Liberation Tigers of Tamil Eelam: 2
