= Type 60 self-propelled 106 mm recoilless rifle =

Japanese anti-tank vehicle

Type-60 self-propelled 106 mm recoilless rifle
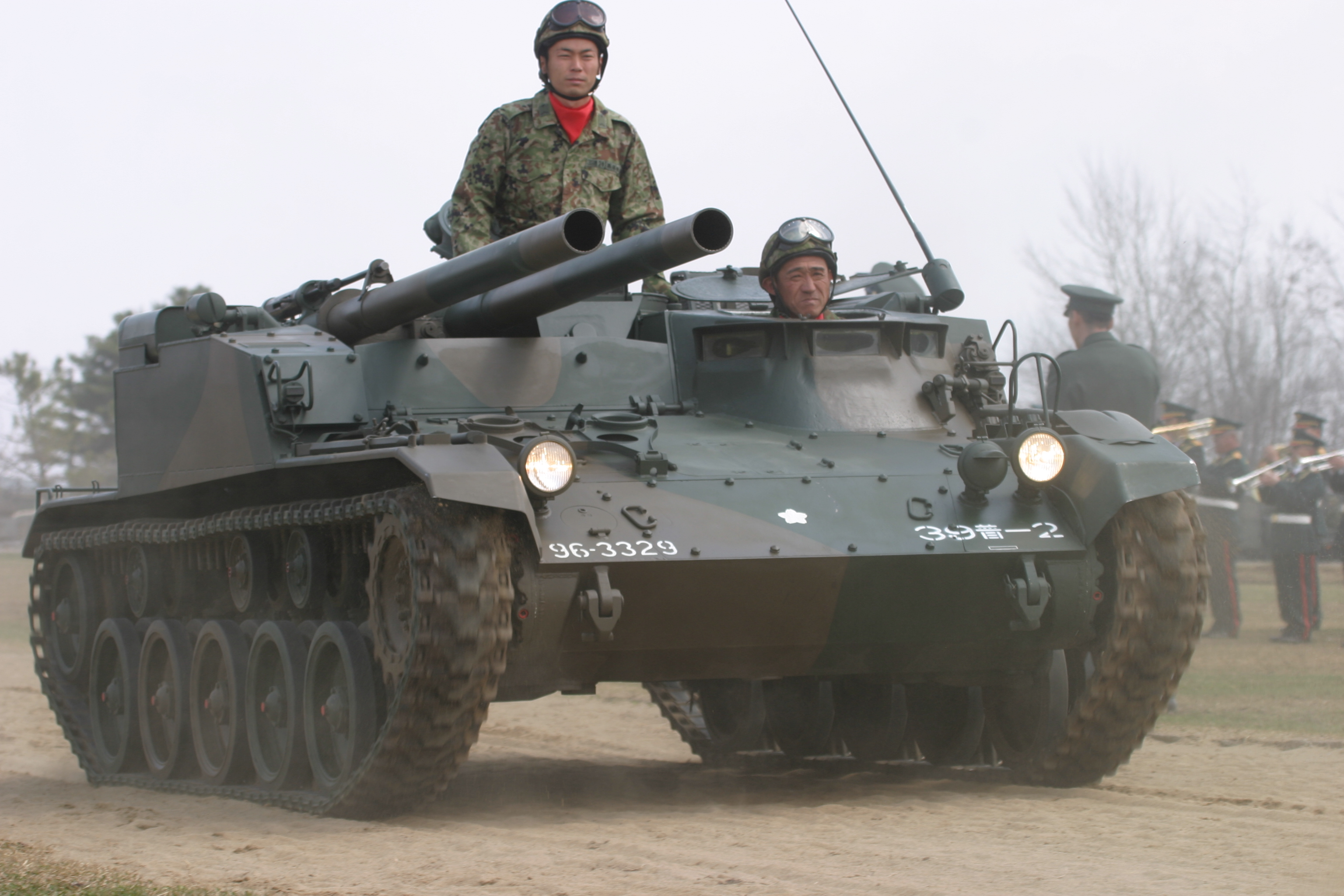
- Komatsu Type-60 recoilless gun during winter exercises
- Type: Tank destroyer
- Place of origin: Japan

Service history
- In service: 1960-2008
- Used by: Japan

Production history
- Designer: Komatsu
- Designed: 1956-1960
- Manufacturer: Komatsu
- Produced: 1960–77
- No. built: 252

Specifications
- Mass: 8,000 kilograms (18,000 lb)
- Length: 4.3 m (14 ft 1 in)
- Width: 2.23 m (7 ft 4 in)
- Height: 1.38 m (4 ft 6 in)
- Crew: 3
- Caliber: 105 mm (4.1 in)
- Elevation: -20° to +15°
- Traverse: 60°
- Muzzle velocity: 500 m/s
- Effective firing range: 2,750 m (3,010 yd)
- Maximum firing range: 7,700 m (8,400 yd)
- Armor: 12 mm (0.5 in) steel
- Main armament: 2 × M40 recoilless rifles
- Secondary armament: 1 × .50 caliber spotting rifle
- Engine: Komatsu 6T 120-2 air-cooled, 6-cylinder diesel 150 hp (110 kW)
- Power/weight: 15 hp/tonne
- Transmission: manual (4 forward and 1 reverse gears)
- Suspension: torsion bar
- Ground clearance: 0.35 m (14 in)
- Fuel capacity: 140 L (37 U.S. gal)
- Operational range: 250 km (160 mi) (road)
- Maximum speed: 55 km/h (34 mph)

The Type-60 self-propelled 106 mm recoilless gun (or rifle) (60式自走無反動砲, roku-maru-shiki-jisou-muhandou-hou) is a light anti-tank vehicle developed by Japan in the late 1950s. It mounts two M40 106 mm recoilless rifles as its main armament.

== Development ==
In 1954, the Japan Ground Self-Defense Force contracted for one prototype each from Mitsubishi Heavy Industries (SS1) and Komatsu (SS2). powered by a 105 hp six-cylinder and a 110 hp six-cylinder diesel engine and fitted with two 105-millimeter (4.1 in) recoilless rifles. They were delivered in 1956. A second series of prototypes was built with 4 recoilless rifles, but adoption of the 105mm American M40 recoilless rifle forced the reversion to two weapons. The Type 60 was designed for ambush attacks against enemy tanks, and mounting four weapons gave the vehicle a rather high profile. A third series of three heavier prototypes was built by Komatsu as SS4, with a more powerful engine, a new transmission and clutch and a two-speed auxiliary transmission. They were accepted into service in September 1960.

Starting in 1974, a 150 hp Komatsu SA4D105 air-cooled, 4-cylinder diesel engine was fitted.

== Operation ==
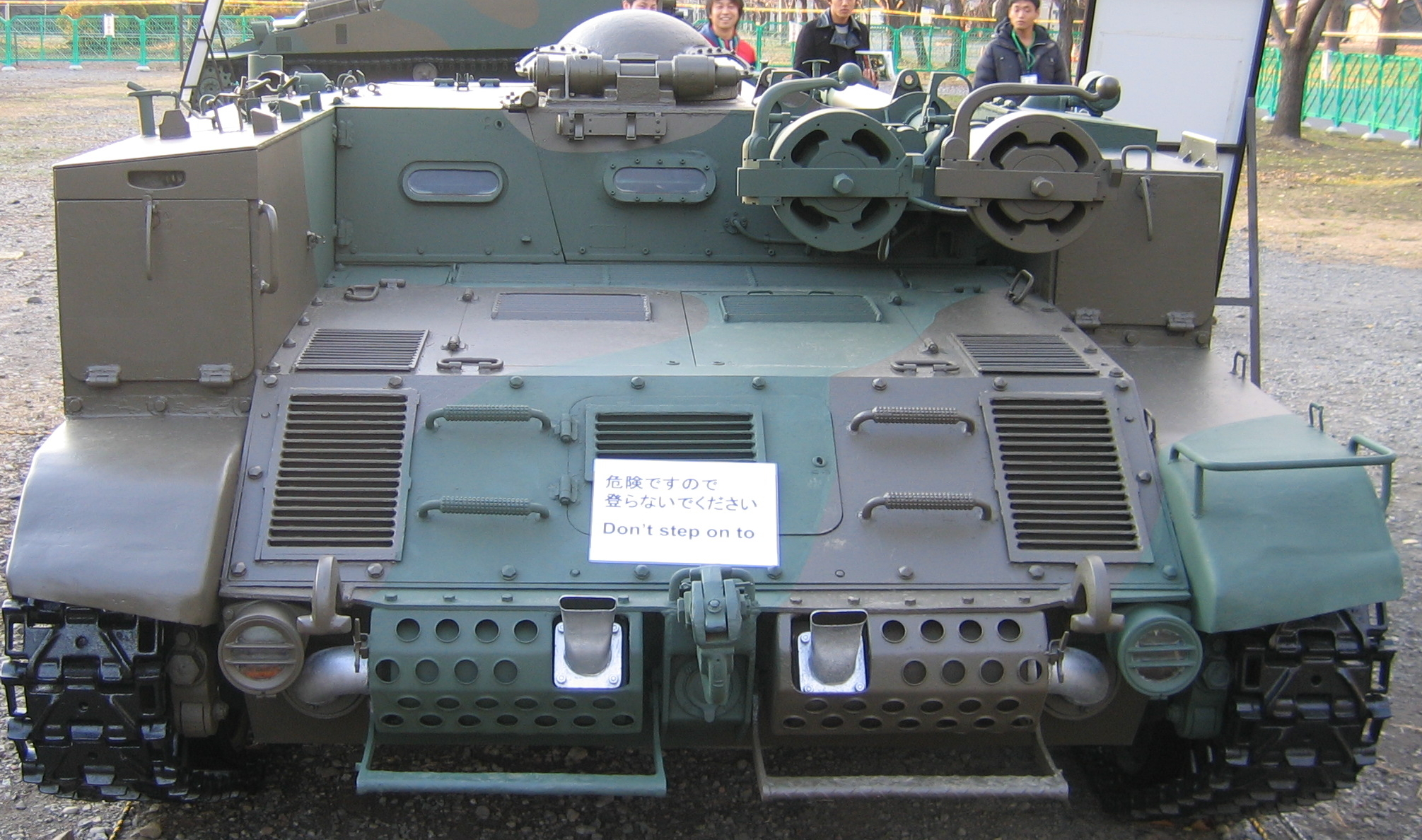
Rear view of a Type 60 at the Sinbudai Old Weapon Museum, Camp Asaka, Japan

The commander is seated to the left of the two weapons and his position is attached to their mounting so that he remains at the same height when they are elevated for firing. The M40s can be fired from the lowered position, but their traverse is limited to 20°, elevation to +10° and depression to -5°. The elevation mechanism is manually operated and allows the weapons to traverse 30° to each side. The loader is seated to the left of the commander and must exit through his rear-opening hatch to reload the recoilless rifles while on top of the engine deck or behind the vehicle.

Eight rounds of ammunition are stowed on board, and two outside.

In 2001, Japan reported to the United Nations Office for Disarmament Affairs that 140 Type 60s were in service.

== Similar vehicles ==
- M50 Ontos
