= Lists of artillery =

Artillery has been one of primary weapons of war since before the Napoleonic Era. Several countries have developed and built artillery systems, while artillery itself has been continually improved and redesigned to meet the evolving needs of the battlefield. This has led to a multitude of different types and designs which have played a role in the history of warfare and continue to be a significant factor in modern combat.

For the most part, the following lists of artillery cover guns, howitzers, mortars, and other large projectile weapons. Small arms and missiles are not generally included, though rockets and other bombardment weapons may be. For a more complete listing of various weapons, see list of weapons.

== By type ==
=== Field artillery === : Field guns; Self-propelled artillery; Self-propelled field guns; Howitzers; Self-propelled howitzers; Gun-howitzers; Gun-mortars; Quick-firing guns; Infantry support guns; Self-propelled infantry guns; Mountain artillery; Muzzle-loading guns; Siege artillery	=== Specialized guns === : Anti-aircraft guns; Anti-tank guns; Assault guns; Autocannons; Coastal artillery; Nuclear artillery; Recoilless rifles; Self-propelled anti-aircraft guns; Self-propelled anti-tank guns; Large-calibre artillery; Coilgun; Railgun	=== Mortars === : Heavy mortars; Infantry mortars; Self-propelled mortars; === Rockets === : Rocket artillery; === Transport-built-in artillery === : Airborne guns; Naval guns; Railway guns; Tank guns; Self-propelled gun; Self-propelled anti-aircraft weapon

== By country ==
Argentina; Australia; Austria; Belgium; Brazil; Canada; China; Croatia; Czech Republic/Czechoslovakia; Finland; France; (Georgia (country)) Georgia; Germany; Greece	Hungary; India; Indonesia; Iran; Israel; Italy; Japan; Mexico; Nepal; Netherlands; New Zealand; Norway; Pakistan; Philippines; Portugal; Poland	Romania; Serbia; Singapore; South Africa; Soviet Union and Russia; Spain; Sweden; Switzerland; Syria; Taiwan; Thailand; Turkey; United Kingdom; United States; (Socialist Federal Republic of Yugoslavia) Yugoslavia
