= 76 mm divisional gun M1933 =

76-mm divisional gun M1933
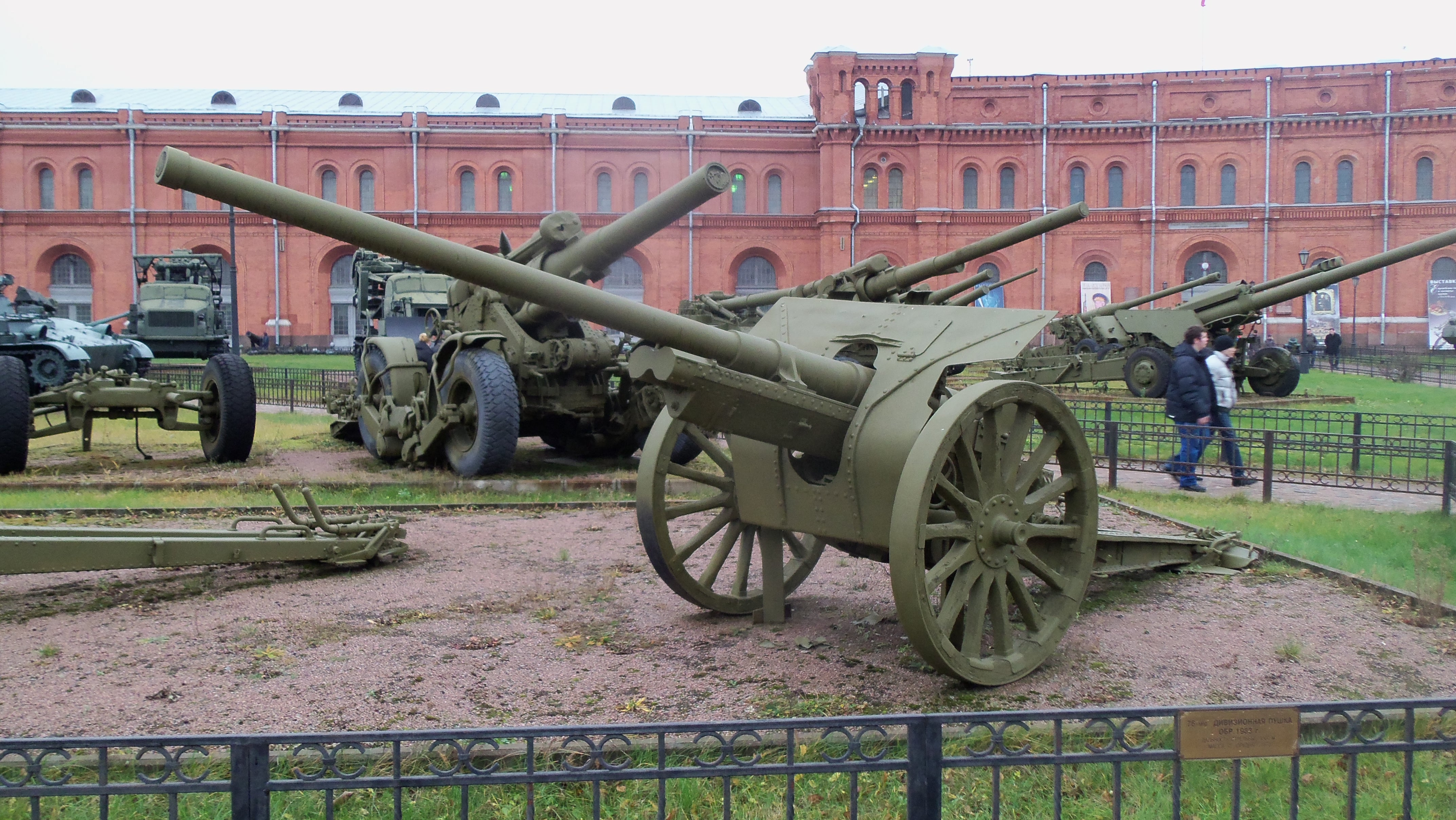
- 76-mm divisional gun M1933 at the Military-historical Museum of Artillery, Engineer and Signal Corps.
- Type: Field gun
- Place of origin: Soviet Union

Service history
- In service: 1933–1945
- Used by: Red Army
- Wars: Winter War; World War II

Production history
- Produced: 1933

Specifications
- Mass: Travel: 2,350 kg (5,180 lb); Combat: 1,600 kg (3,500 lb)
- Barrel length: 3.8 m (12 ft 6 in) L/50
- Crew: 6
- Shell: Fixed QF 76.2 × 385mm R
- Shell weight: 6.4 kg (14 lb)
- Caliber: 76.2 mm (3 in)
- Recoil: hydro-pneumatic
- Carriage: box trail
- Elevation: -3° to 43°
- Traverse: 4°
- Rate of fire: 15 rounds per minute
- Muzzle velocity: 715 m/s (2,350 ft/s)
- Maximum firing range: 13.2 km (8.2 mi)

The 76-mm divisional gun M1933 was a Soviet divisional field gun, which was adopted in limited numbers by the Red Army in 1933.

== Description ==
The M1933 was a transitional type between the modernized 76 mm divisional gun M1902/30 and the 76 mm divisional gun M1936 (F-22). It followed an established pattern of mating a new gun barrel with an existing carriage from the 122 mm howitzer M1910/30. The gun was equipped with a box trail, unsprung spoked wheels, gun shield, hydro-pneumatic recoil system and was chambered in the standard 76.2 × 385mm R. Despite being considered a stopgap until the adoption of the M1936, some were still on hand during the opening phases of World War II. The German designation for the gun was 7.62 cm FK 298(r), but it is not known if the Germans used the type.

== Photo Gallery ==
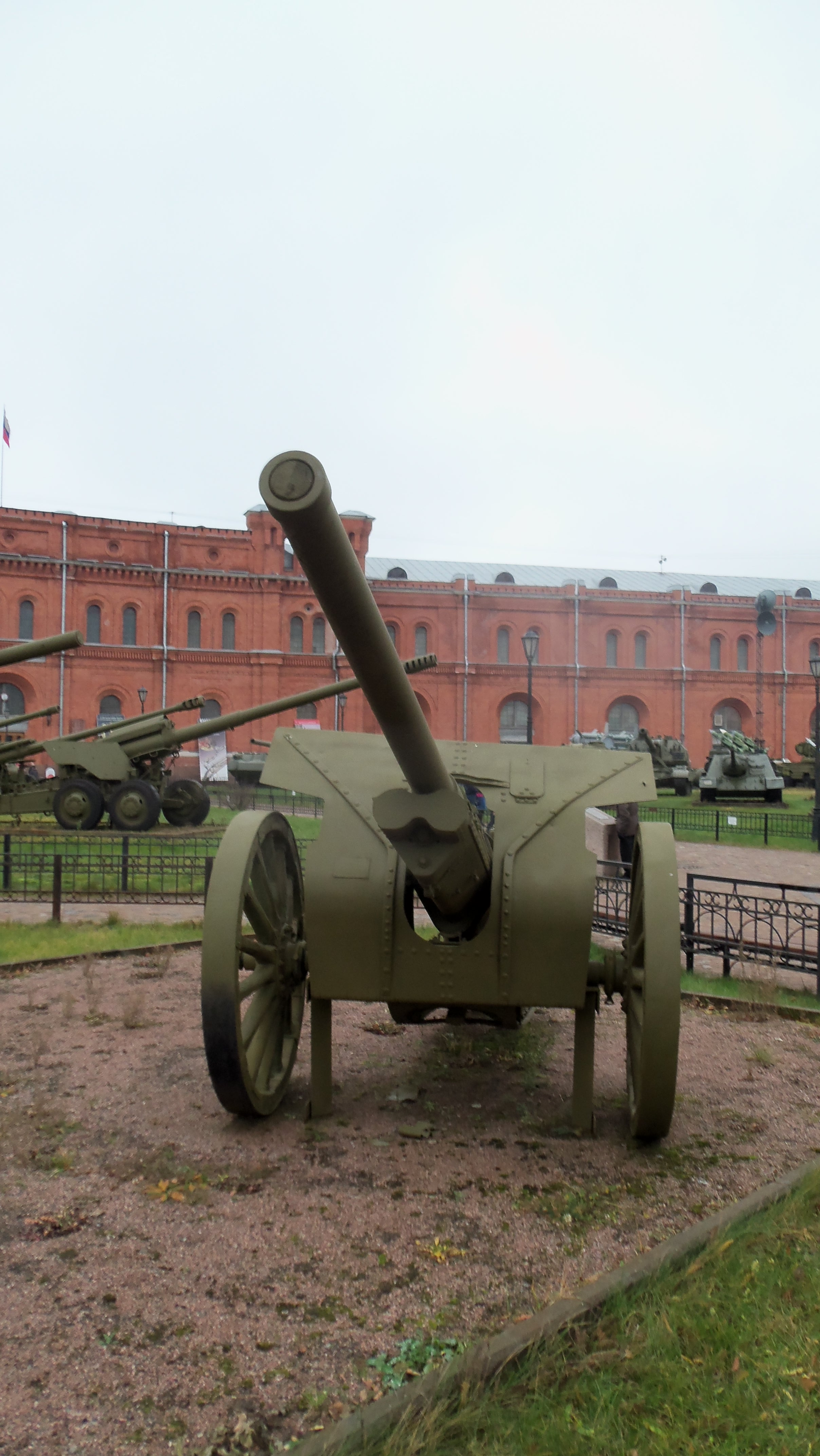

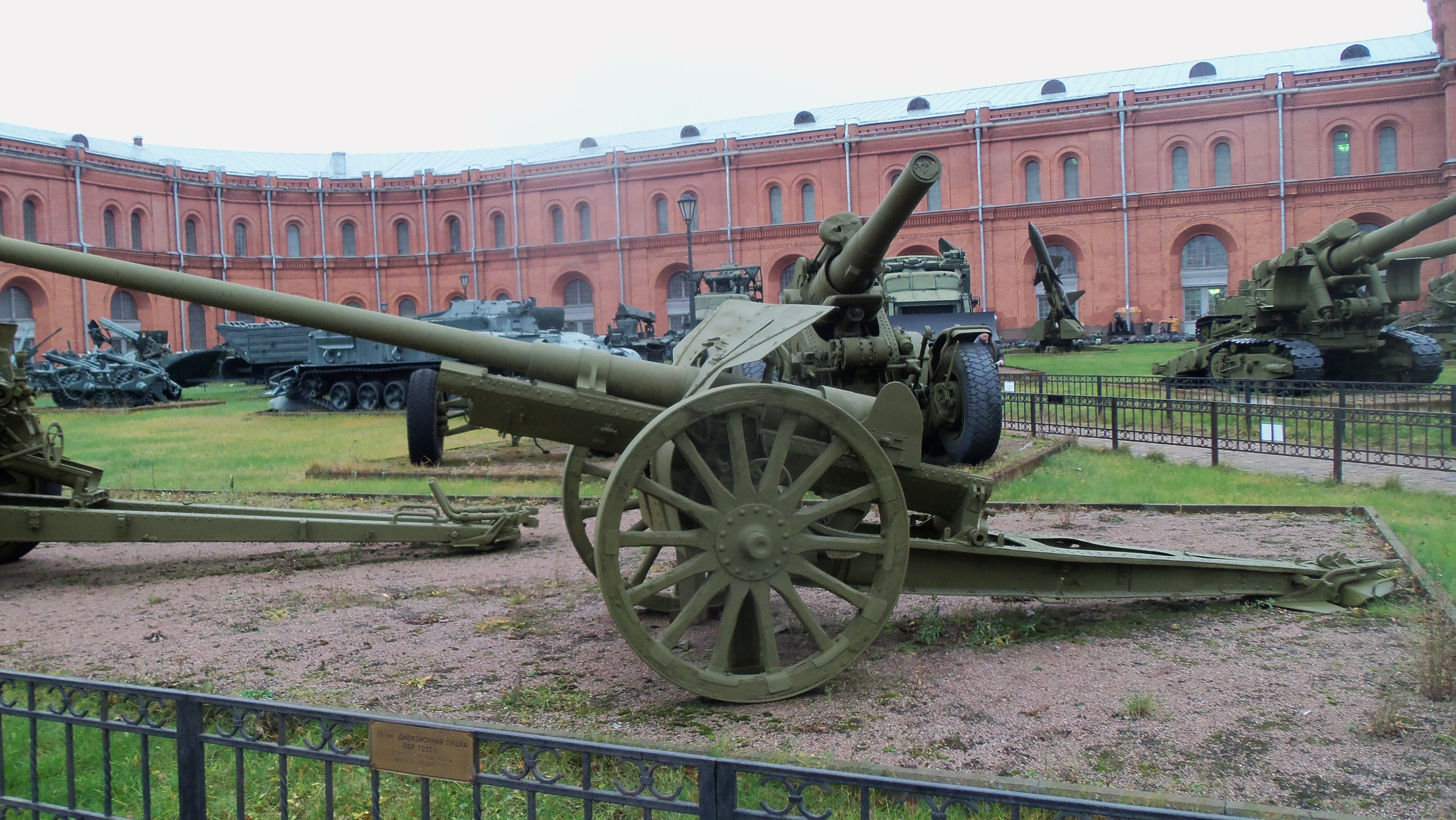

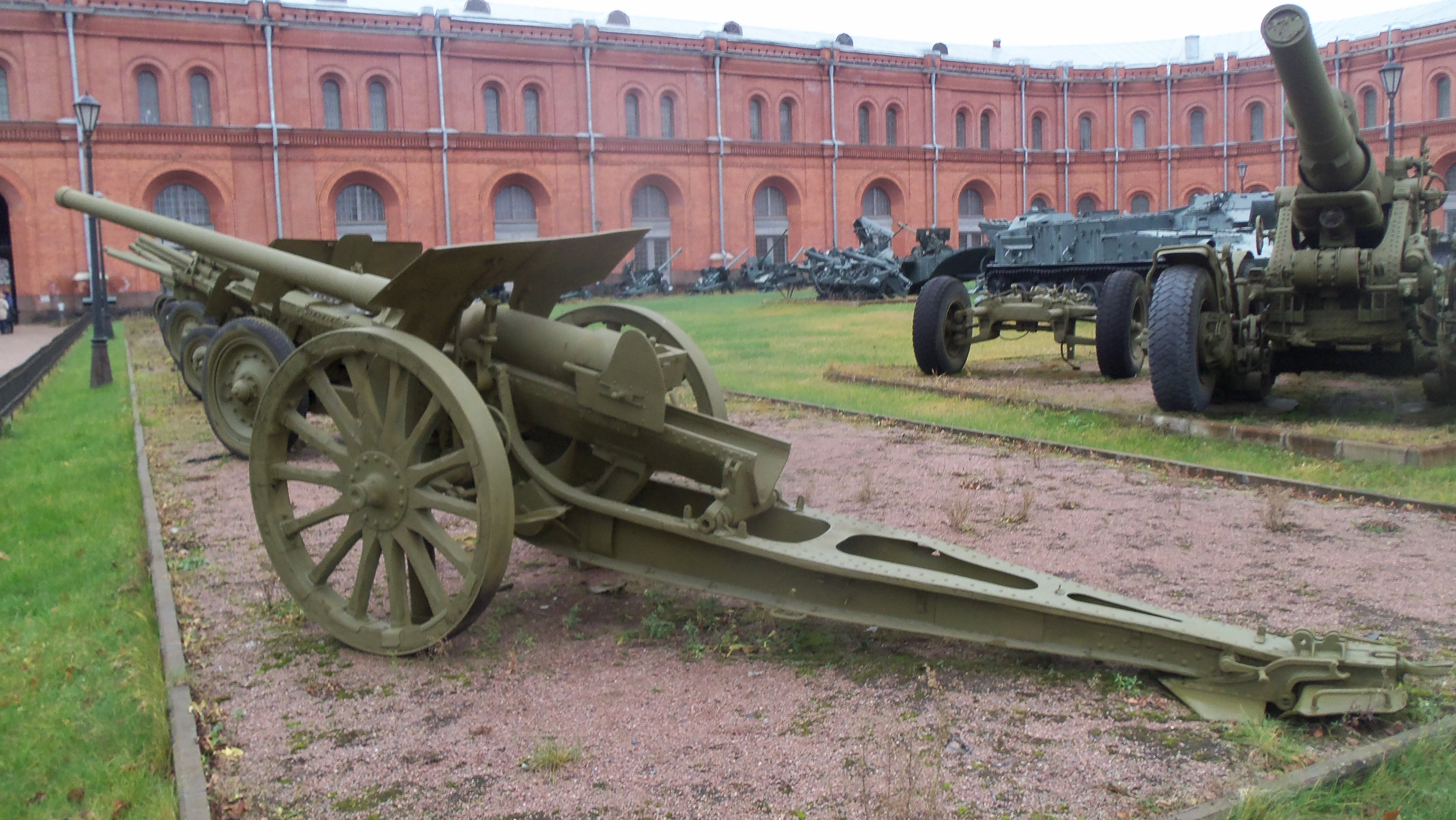

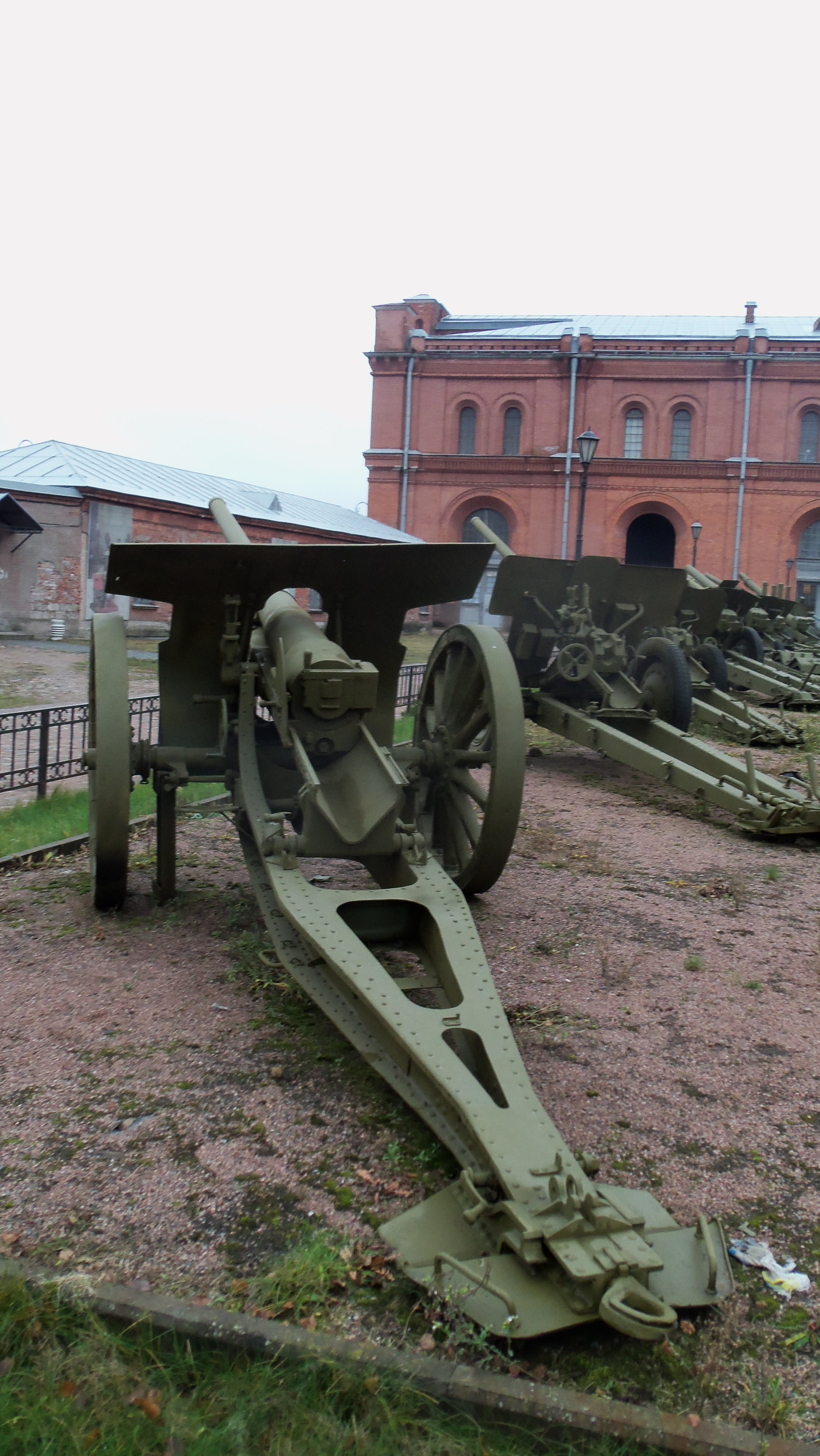
