= List of naval guns =

== See also ==
- List of artillery
- List of the largest cannon by caliber
- Glossary of British ordnance terms
- Naval artillery
