= D-74 122 mm field gun =

Soviet post-WW2 122mm field gun

D-74 field gun
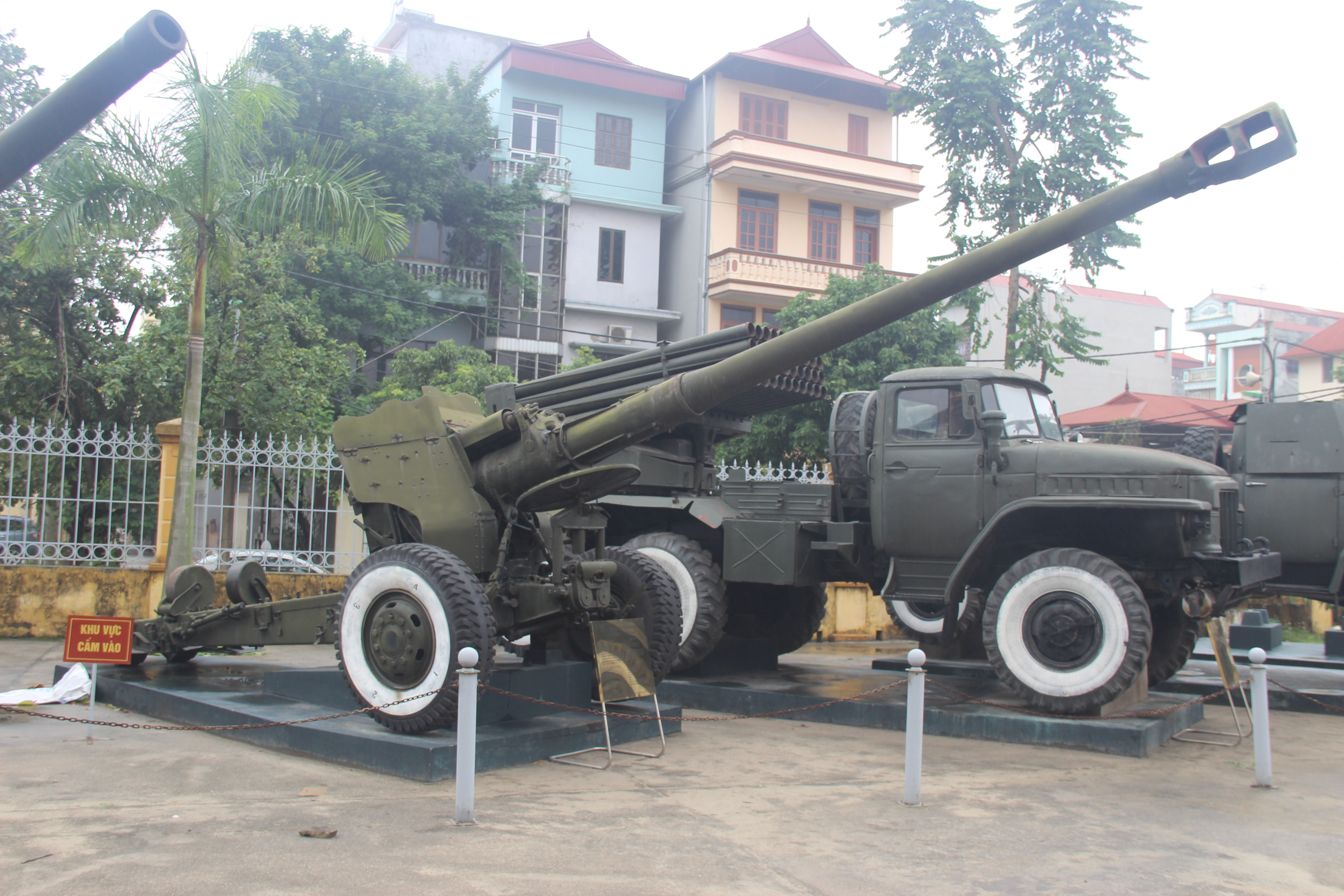
- 122mm D-74 in Vietnam Military History Museum, Vietnam
- Type: Field gun
- Place of origin: Soviet Union

Service history
- Used by: Various
- Wars: Vietnam War; Sino-Vietnamese War; Sino-Soviet border conflict; Indo-Pakistani War of 1965; Sino-Indian War; Yom Kippur War; Iran–Iraq War; Lebanese Civil War; South African Border War; Russo-Ukrainian War

Production history
- Designed: 1944
- Produced: 1955

Specifications
- Mass: 5,620 kg (12,390 lbs)
- Length: 9.875 m (30 ft)
- Barrel length: 6.45 m (21 ft 2 in) 52.9 caliber
- Width: 2.35 m (7 ft 9 in)
- Height: 2.7 m (8 ft 10 in)
- Crew: 7~9
- Shell: Separate loading charge and projectile
- Caliber: 122 mm (4.8 in)
- Breech: Semi-automatic vertical sliding-wedge
- Recoil: Hydro-pneumatic
- Carriage: Split-trail
- Elevation: +45/−5 degree
- Traverse: 45 degree
- Rate of fire: Maximum: 8–10 rpm
- Muzzle velocity: 885 m/s (2,907 ft/s)
- Effective firing range: Indirect: 23.9 km (15 mi); Direct: 1.08 km (.67 mi)
- Maximum firing range: 24 km (15 mi)

The 122mm D-74 towed gun is a Soviet field gun. Developed in the late 1940s, it served with the Soviet Army and was widely exported. A number were produced under license in the People's Republic of China as the Type 60.

== History ==
The 122 mm (originally 48 lines) calibre has been in Russian service since the early 20th century. After World War II the Soviet Union developed two new long range guns to replace existing 122 mm and 152 mm guns such as 122 mm gun M1931 (A-19), 122 mm gun M1931/37 (A-19), 152 mm gun M1910/30 and 152 mm gun M1935 (Br-2). The two new guns were the 122 mm D-74 and the 130 mm M-46.

The D-74 design was probably initiated in the late 1940s and it was first seen in public in 1955. It was designed by the well established design bureau at Artillery Plant No. 9 in Sverdlovsk (now Motovilikha Plants in Yekaterinburg), led by the eminent artillery designer Fëdor Fëdorovich Petrov who was also responsible for several World War II and later artillery designs. The design team also developed the 152 mm gun howitzer D-20 at much the same time, and both D-74 and D-20 use the same carriage.

Both the 122 mm D-74 and 130 mm M-46 entered Soviet service, but the heavier shell and greater range of the M-46 meant that it outlasted the D-74.

== Description ==
The D-74 has a 52 calibre barrel, with a double baffle muzzle brake and a semi-automatic vertical sliding-block breach, with a tied jaw and the block moving down to open. The barrel is mounted in a long ring cradle with the trunnions just forward of the breach. The recoil system (buffer and recuperator) is mounted on the cradle above the barrel. Compression balancing gear is attached behind the saddle support, passing through the complex shaped saddle to connect to the cradle just forward of the trunnions. This can be manually re-pressured by a pump below the breach. The breach has a projectile retaining catch to prevent the shell sliding out at higher elevations before it is rammed with a manual rammer.

Top traverse totals 60° and the vertical elevation range in −5° to 50°.

Box girder section split trail legs are hinged to the cradle support, with bolts to lock them into either the open or closed position. The cradle support also has a bolt for locking the barrel in centre for traverse before towing the gun. There are small spades at the end of each trail leg, and fittings for large spades that are carried on the side of each trail leg. The large spades are used on soft ground and are fitted to the trail ends via have a pintle in the same way as the similar spades on M-46. These spades are the main difference from the D-20 carriage.

To assist with all-round carriage traverse, there is a pivot jack mounted at the front of the cradle support. The pivot jack is not a sole plate and the gun fires with its foam filled rubber tyred wheels supporting the gun on the ground. When the gun is brought into action the pivot jack is folded down and adjusted to be on the ground. If the requires large traverse, small jacks on each trail leg are rotated downwards, and the trails jacked up until the main wheels are lifted clear of the ground and the bogey wheels mounted on each trail leg swung downwards and the trail jacks raised, the carriage is then traversed, and the trail jacks re-used to lift the bogey wheels and then place the piece back on its main wheels.

The pivot jack is also used to secure the barrel against vertical movement when the gun is being towed. The barrel is locked in centre for traverse with a bolt on the cradle support. The jack is folded upwards, lugs on the ring cradle engage the jack base and two tensioners fixed to the saddle support are hooked to the cradle, these are tightened to lock the cradle onto the jack base.

As was normal for the period the gun has a shield, including a folding piece below the cradle support. The centre section of the upper shield both slides up and down and folds to accommodate the barrel at higher elevation angles of fire. The shield may offer some protection against muzzle blast to the sights and layer, although it is usually shown being fired with a long lanyard, but is probably mostly for defence against machine gun fire.

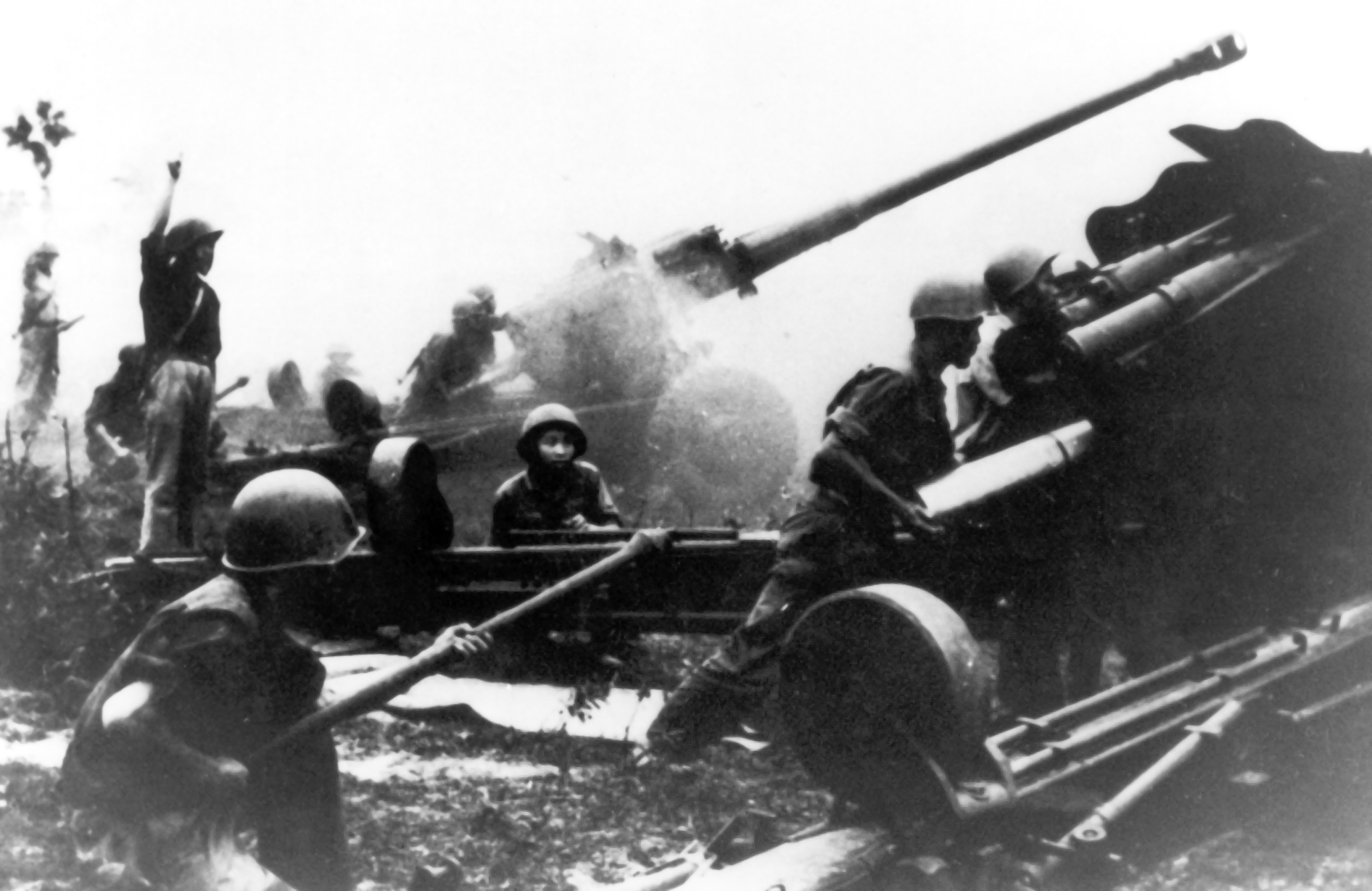
D-74 122mm field guns in use with PAVN during the Vietnam War

The non-reciprocating sights are designed for one-person laying. Included are a direct fire anti-tank telescope (OP4M), a panoramic periscopic indirect-fire sight, a dial sight, (PG1M), an angle of sight scale, and a range drum for the single charge engraved with the range (distance) scale, coupled to an elevation levelling bubble mounted on dial sight mount. The range drum enables the standard Soviet technique of semi-direct fire when the piece is laid visually on the target and the range set on the range drum.

The gun fires separate ammunition using a metal cartridge case that also provides obturation. The ammunition is different to that used with 122 mm howitzers. There is a single charge without increments. The shell weight is 25 kg with a muzzle velocity of 900 m/s although the slightly lighter APHE shell has a higher muzzle velocity.

Maximum rate of fire is usually stated as six rounds per minute.

The detachment was either eight or nine men, probably differing between armies and period. In Soviet service the 5,600 kg gun was usually towed by a URAL-375 6×6 truck, AT-S or AT-L medium tractor in some regions.

== Operators ==
D-74 122 mm field gun firing.

- Algeria
- Chad
- China — Most/all Type 60.
- Laos — In service as of January 2019.
- Mauritania
- Nigeria
- North Korea
- Russia — In service as of October 2024.
- Sudan
- Syria
- Vietnam — Some/all Type 60.
- Zimbabwe — Some/all Type 60.

=== Former operators ===
- Democratic Republic of Afghanistan: 62 in service in the 1980s.
- Burkina Faso
- Cambodia
- Cuba
- Egypt
- Islamic State
- Pakistan
- Soviet Union
