= 10.5 cm schwere Kanone 18/40 =

- Type: Field gun
- Place of origin: Germany

Service history
- Used by: Nazi Germany, Bulgaria
- Wars: World War II

Production history
- Produced: 1943-45

Specifications
- Mass: 5,680 kg (12,520 lb)
- Barrel length: 6.3 m (21 ft) L/60
- Shell: separate-loading, cased charge and projectile
- Shell weight: 15.14 kg (33.4 lb)
- Caliber: 105 mm (4.1 in)
- Breech: horizontal sliding block
- Carriage: Split trail
- Elevation: 0° to +45°
- Traverse: 56°
- Rate of fire: 6 rpm
- Muzzle velocity: 910 m/s (3,000 ft/s)
- Effective firing range: 21 km (13 mi)

The 10.5 cm schwere Kanone 18/40 was a field gun used by Germany in World War II. The 18/40 arose from an O.K.H request to produce a variant of the 10.5 cm schwere Kanone 18 with greater range. Both Krupp and Rheinmetal produced similar, but competing designs. Production was proposed in 1941, but delayed until 1943 because it was felt its introduction would disrupt existing production schedules. When it did go into production it was designated as the 10.5 cm schwere Kanone 18/42. The main difference between the schwere Kanone 18 and schwere Kanone 18/42 were a longer barrel and the same carriage as the 15 cm sFH 18/40.
