= Type 67 mortar =

1967 Chinese infantry support weapon

The Type 67 82mm Mortar is Chinese infantry support weapon developed in 1967. It is a modernization of the older Type 53 82mm mortar, which is the Chinese copy of Soviet PM-41 82mm mortar.

The mortar was widely used in the Vietnam War by the People's Army of Vietnam (NVA). This mortar can be used in nearly horizontal direction, which means it can be used to destroy pillboxes and obstructions.

The Type 67 82mm mortar can use different types of shells. The shrapnel of this mortar weights 3.32 kg, with a 0.4 kg TNT, and the lethal radius of this shrapnel is 26m.

== Users ==
- Central African Republic
- Iraq
- Myanmar:100+
- Vietnam
