= Type 83 122 mm howitzer =

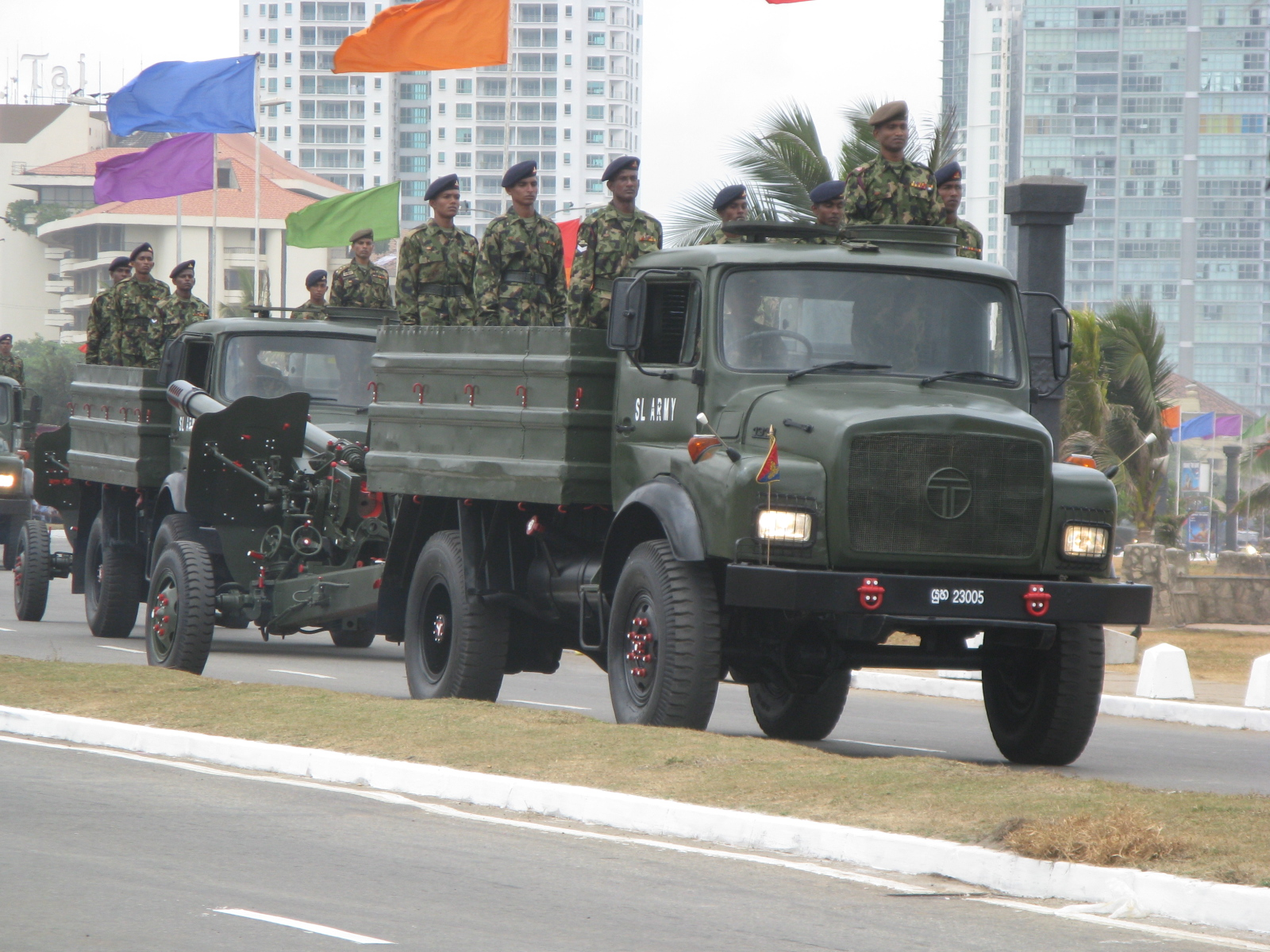
- A Type 83 in Sri Lankan military service
- Type: Towed howitzer
- Place of origin: China

Service history
- Used by: China; Bangladesh; Sri Lanka
- Wars: Sri Lankan Civil War

Specifications
- Shell: Separate loading charge and projectile
- Caliber: 122 mm (4.8 in)
- Breech: Vertical semi-automatic sliding-wedge
- Recoil: Hydraulic buffer and hydro-pneumatic recuperator
- Carriage: Split trail

The Type 83 122 mm howitzer is a towed howitzer used by the People's Liberation Army of China. The gun system is developed from the earlier Chinese Type 54 howitzer which was in turn developed from the Soviet 122 mm howitzer M1938 (M-30).

== Specification ==
Parameter	Value
Diameter	122mm
Maximum muzzle velocity	of 618 m / s, (Type 83 anti-burst grenade)
projectile weight	21.76 kg,
maximum rate of fire	7-8 rounds / min,
maximum range	15,600 meters (grenade), 19,000 m (remote bomb),
Minimum range	3750m
Direct distance	f 1000m
Deviation	0.5%
Maximum chamber pressure	264.8MPa
Chamber volume	5.769dm3
Rifling	36, D gradually speed,
wrapping angle	4 ° 59'14 "~ 9 ° 4'23"
Barrel length	3634mm(30caliber)
Recoil length	920 ~ 1050mm
Recoil resistance	141.4kN
Direction of fire	54 °
level of fire	-3 ° ~ +65 °
March weight	2700kg
combat weight	2.627 tons
march Length	7862mm
March width	2157mm
march Height	2088mm
FireWire high	1137mm
March conversion time	1 ~ 1.5 min fighting
crew size	8 people

== Design ==
The basic design of the type 83 is similar to the earlier M-30. However, the Type 83 has a split-shield which is similar to that used by the 152 mm towed gun-howitzer M1955 (D-20) and has a multi-baffle muzzle brake.
