= List of coastal artillery =

Caliber (mm)	Weapon name	Country of origin	Period
57	QF 6 pounder 10 cwt gun	United Kingdom	World War II
57	57 55 J	Finland	1950 - 1965
75	7.5 cm tornpjäs m/57	Sweden	1962 - 2000
75	75mm 50 caliber Pattern 1892	Russian Empire	World War I - World War II
76.2	QF 12 pounder 12 cwt	United Kingdom	World War I - World War II
76.2	Type 41 8 cm naval gun	Japan	World War II
76.2	3-inch gun M1898, M1902, M1903	United States	1899 - 1945
90	90 mm Gun M1/M2/M3	United States	World War II
100	100 56 TK	Finland	1969 – 2012
100	Canon de 100 mm Modèle 1891	France	World War I - World War II
105	10.5 cm tornautomatpjäs m/50	Sweden	Cold War
120	Canon de 120mm L mle 1931	Belgium	World War II
120	4.7 inch gun	United Kingdom	World War I - World War II
120	12 cm tornautomatpjäs m/70	Sweden	Cold War
120	12 cm mobile coastal artillery gun m/80	Sweden	Cold War
120	120mm 45 caliber Pattern 1892	Russian Empire	World War I - World War II
120	120 mm 50 caliber Pattern 1905	Russian Empire	World War I - World War II
120	12 cm/45 3rd Year Type naval gun	Japan	World War II
120	12 cm 11th Year Type naval gun	Japan	World War II
120	Type 41 12 cm naval gun	Japan	World War II
127	5-inch gun M1897	United States	World War I
127	12.7 cm SK C/34 naval gun	Nazi Germany	1934 - 2003
127	5"/51 caliber gun	United States	World War I - World War II
130	130 mm/50 B13 Pattern 1936	Soviet Union	World War II - Cold War
130	130 53 TK	Finland	Cold War Modern
140	14 cm/50 3rd Year Type naval gun	Japan	World War II
145	Canon de 145 L modele 1916 Saint-Chamond	France	World War I - World War II
149.1	15 cm SK L/45	German Empire	World War II
149.1	15 cm SK C/28	Nazi Germany	World War II
152	BL 6 inch Mk III, IV, VI	United Kingdom	1880 - 1905
152	BL 6 inch gun Mk V Elswick export gun	United Kingdom	1884 - 1945
152	BL 6 inch Mk VII naval gun	United Kingdom	World War I - World War II
152	6-inch gun M1897	United States	1897 — 1945
152	6"/50 caliber gun	United States	World War II
152	6-inch siege gun M1877	Russian Empire	World War I - World War II
152	6 inch 35 caliber naval gun 1877	Russian Empire	1885 - 1917
152	152 mm 45 caliber Pattern 1892	Russian Empire	World War I - World War II
152.4	Cannone da 152/45	Italy	World War I - World War II
152	Type 41 15 cm/40 naval gun	Japan	World War II
152	15 cm/45 41st Year Type	Japan	World War II
152	15 cm/50 41st Year Type	Japan	World War II
155	Canon de 155 L modele 1916 Saint-Chamond	France	World War I - World War II
155	155 mm gun M1918MI	United States	1920 - 1945
155	155 mm gun M1/M2	United States	World War II
177.8	RBL 7 inch Armstrong gun	United Kingdom	1861 - ?
177.8	RML 7 inch gun	United Kingdom	1865 - ?
180	180mm Pattern 1931-1933	Soviet Union	World War II
194	Canon de 19 C modèle 1870/93	France	World War I - World War II
194	Canon de 19 C modèle 1875	France	World War I
203	8-inch converted rifle	United States	1864 - 1905
203	8-inch mortar M1877	Russian Empire	World War I
203	203mm 45 caliber Pattern 1892	Russian Empire	World War I
203	203 mm 50 caliber Pattern 1905	Russian Empire	World War I
203	BL 8 inch Mk VII naval gun disappearing gun	United Kingdom	1885 - 1900
203	8-inch gun M1888	United States	1895 - 1945
203	8-inch Navy gun MkVIM3A2	United States	1941 - 1946
203	20.3 cm/45 Type 41 naval gun	Japan	World War II
210	21 cm SK L/40	Nazi Germany	World War II
210	21 cm SK L/45	Nazi Germany	World War II
229	RML 9 inch Mk VI	United Kingdom	1865 - 1922
229	9-inch mortar M1877	Russian Empire	World War I
234	BL 9.2 inch Mk IX & X	United Kingdom	1899 - 1956
240	24 cm SK L/40	German Empire	World War I - World War II
240	Canon de 24 C modèle 1876	France	World War I
240	Canon de 240 modèle 93/96 TAZ	France	World War I - World War II
254	BL 10 inch Mk I	United Kingdom	1885 - 1913
254	10-inch gun M1895	United States	1895 - 1945
254	254mm 45 caliber Pattern 1891	Russian Empire	1897 - 1930
270	Mortier de 270 mm modèle 1889	France	World War I - World War II
280	Obice da 280	Kingdom of Italy	World War I - World War II
280	28 cm howitzer L/10	Japan	Russo-Japanese War / World War I / World War II
280	28 cm Küstenhaubitze	German Empire	1890 - 1945
280	11-inch mortar M1877	Russian Empire	World War I
280	11-inch gun M1877	Russian Empire	World War I
280	28 cm MRK L/35	German Empire	1892 - 1945
280	28 cm SK L/45 gun	German Empire	World War II
280	28 cm SK C/34 naval gun	Nazi Germany	World War II - Cold War
305	Russian 12 inch 40 caliber naval gun	Russian Empire	1896 - 1916
305	Obukhovskii 12"/52 Pattern 1907 gun	Russian Empire	1914 - 1999
305	BL 12 inch naval gun Mk I – VII	United Kingdom	1882 - 1920
305	Type 7 30 cm Howitzer	Japan	1918 - 1945
305	12-inch Mk VIII guns	United Kingdom	1921 - 1926
305	Obice da 305/17 howitzer	Italy	1914 - 1959
305	12-inch coast defense mortar	United States	1895 - 1945
305	12-inch gun M1895	United States	1895 - 1945
305	30.5 cm SK L/50 gun	Nazi Germany	1909 - 1945
340	340mm/45 Modèle 1912 gun	France	World War II
343	BL 13.5 inch naval gun Mk III disappearing gun	United Kingdom	World War I - World War II
343	BL 13.5-inch Mk V railway gun	United Kingdom	World War II
356	BL 14 inch Mk VII naval gun	United Kingdom	World War II
356	14-inch gun M1907	United States	World War I - World War II
356	14-inch M1920 railway gun	United States	1925 - 1946
380	380 mm/45 Modèle 1935 gun	France	World War II
380	38 cm SK L/45 "Max" naval gun	German Empire	World War I
380	38 cm SK C/34 naval gun	Nazi Germany	World War II
381	15-inch Rodman gun	United States	1861 - 1905
381	Cannone navale da 381/40	Italy	World War I - World War II
381	38.1 cm/45 Model 1926	Spain	1926 - 2008
381	BL 15 inch Mk I naval gun	United Kingdom	1915 - 1959
406	RML 16 inch 80 ton gun	United Kingdom	1880 - 1902
406	16-inch gun M1895	United States	World War I - World War II
406	16-inch gun M1919	United States	1920 - 1945
406	16-inch howitzer M1920	United States	1922 - 1945
406	16"/50 caliber Mark 2 gun	United States	1920 - 1945
406	40.6 cm / SKC 34 Naval gun "Adolf Gun"	Nazi Germany	World War II - Cold War
410	41 cm/45 3rd Year Type naval gun	Japan	1920 - 1945
450	RML 17.72 inch gun	United Kingdom	1877 - 1906

== See also ==
- List of the largest cannon by caliber
