= Canon de 305 modèle 93/96 TAZ =

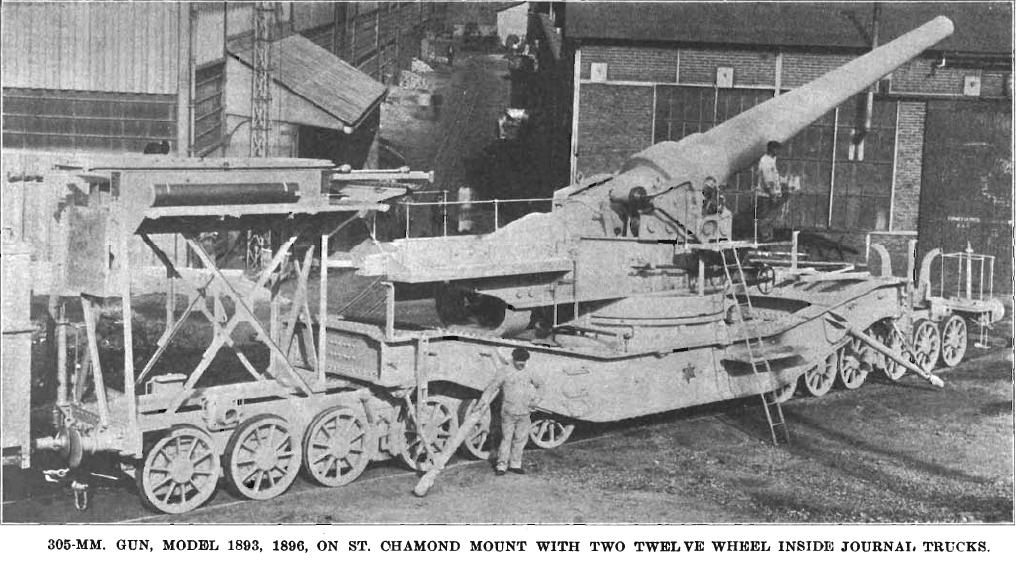
- A 305 mm modèle 1893-1896 TAZ, on a St Chamond railway mounting.
- Type: Railway gun
- Place of origin: France

Service history
- In service: 1916–1918
- Used by: France
- Wars: World War I

Production history
- Designer: St Chamond
- Manufacturer: St Chamond
- Produced: 1915
- No. built: 8

Specifications
- Mass: 175 t (172 long tons; 193 short tons)
- Barrel length: 12.2 m (40 ft) L/40
- Shell: Separate loading bagged charges and projectiles
- Shell weight: 350 kg (770 lb)
- Caliber: 305 mm (12 in)
- Breech: Welin interrupted-screw breech
- Carriage: Two six-axle rail bogies
- Elevation: ? to +40°
- Traverse: 10° L/R
- Rate of fire: 1 round every four minutes
- Muzzle velocity: 795 m/s (2,610 ft/s)
- Maximum firing range: 27.5 km (17 mi)

The Canon de 305 modèle 93/96 TAZ was a French Railway gun used by the French Army during World War I.

== History ==
Although the majority of combatants had heavy field artillery prior to the outbreak of the First World War, none had adequate numbers of heavy guns in service, nor had they foreseen the growing importance of heavy artillery once the Western Front stagnated and trench warfare set in. Since aircraft of the period were not yet capable of carrying large diameter bombs the burden of delivering heavy firepower fell on the artillery. Two sources of heavy artillery suitable for conversion to field use were surplus coastal defense guns and naval guns.

However, a paradox faced artillery designers of the time; while large caliber naval guns were common, large caliber land weapons were not due to their weight, complexity, and lack of mobility. Large caliber field guns often required extensive site preparation because the guns had to be broken down into multiple loads light enough to be towed by a horse team or the few traction engines of the time and then reassembled before use. Building a new gun could address the problem of disassembling, transporting and reassembling a large gun, but it did not necessarily address how to convert existing heavy weapons to make them more mobile. Rail transport proved to be the most practical solution because the problems of heavy weight, lack of mobility and reduced setup time were addressed.

== Design ==
The Canon de 305 modèle 93/96 TAZ started life as eight surplus Canon de 305 mm Modèle 1893/96 naval guns which armed pre-dreadnought battleships of the Charlemagne, République, and Liberté-class. The guns were typical built-up guns of the period which consisted of a rifled liner reinforced by layers of hoops. The guns used a Welin interrupted screw breech and fired separate loading bagged charges and projectiles. The guns sat on a top carriage traversing mount which sat on a large diameter geared steel ring. A rectangular steel firing platform sat on top of the platform with the barrel of the gun overhanging the platform at the front with an overhanging loading platform for the gunners to the rear. The firing platform was then traversed by a worm gear which attached to the base. To load the gun the barrel was lowered and there was an elevated shell handling trolley at the rear.

The carriages consisted of rectangular steel bases, which were suspended on two railroad bogies. Each bogie had six axles. The number of axles was determined by the weight limit for European railways of 17 tonnes (19 short tons) per axle. Since the barrels were naval guns that were not intended for use at high angles of elevation the trunnions were relocated relatively far forward and the guns were nose heavy. The carriage used ground platform anchoring and site preparation included laying wooden beams parallel to the tracks then splicing in a section of rail bed reinforced with wooden beams under the center which the carriage was lowered onto. Outriggers and ground anchors were also used to stabilize the gun once in firing position as well as screw jacks. Although the mount was capable of 360° of traverse it was often limited to 10° left/right of the centerline because of problems with balance and recoil. Another issue for the mount was that although the gun could be elevated up to +40° it was limited to +20° of elevation when the gun was fired parallel to the tracks due to recoil. For these reasons, the weapon was not considered a success. The carriages were originally deployed in 1916 but it was too much gun for too little carriage so the 305 mm (12 in) barrels were later replaced with 240 mm (9.4 in) barrels by St Chamond and the Canon de 240 modèle 93/96 TAZ entered service in 1918.

== Ammunition ==
- APC (Armor Piercing Capped) - 340 kg (750 lb)
- CI (Common Incendiary) - 292 kg (644 lb)
- SAPC (Semi-Armor Piercing Capped) - 340 kg (750 lb)

== Photo Gallery ==
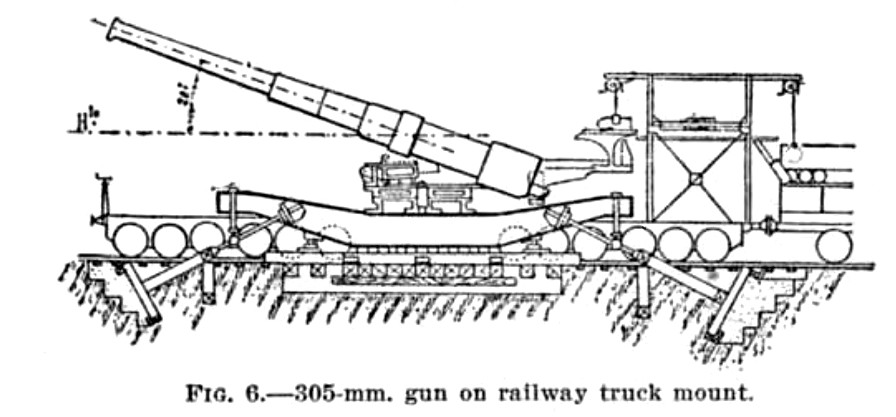
A diagram of the site preparation needed for the Canon de 305 modèle 93/96 TAZ.

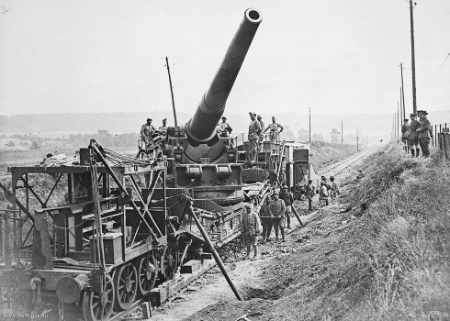
Canadian Army officers inspecting a Canon de 305 modèle 93/96 TAZ in 1917.

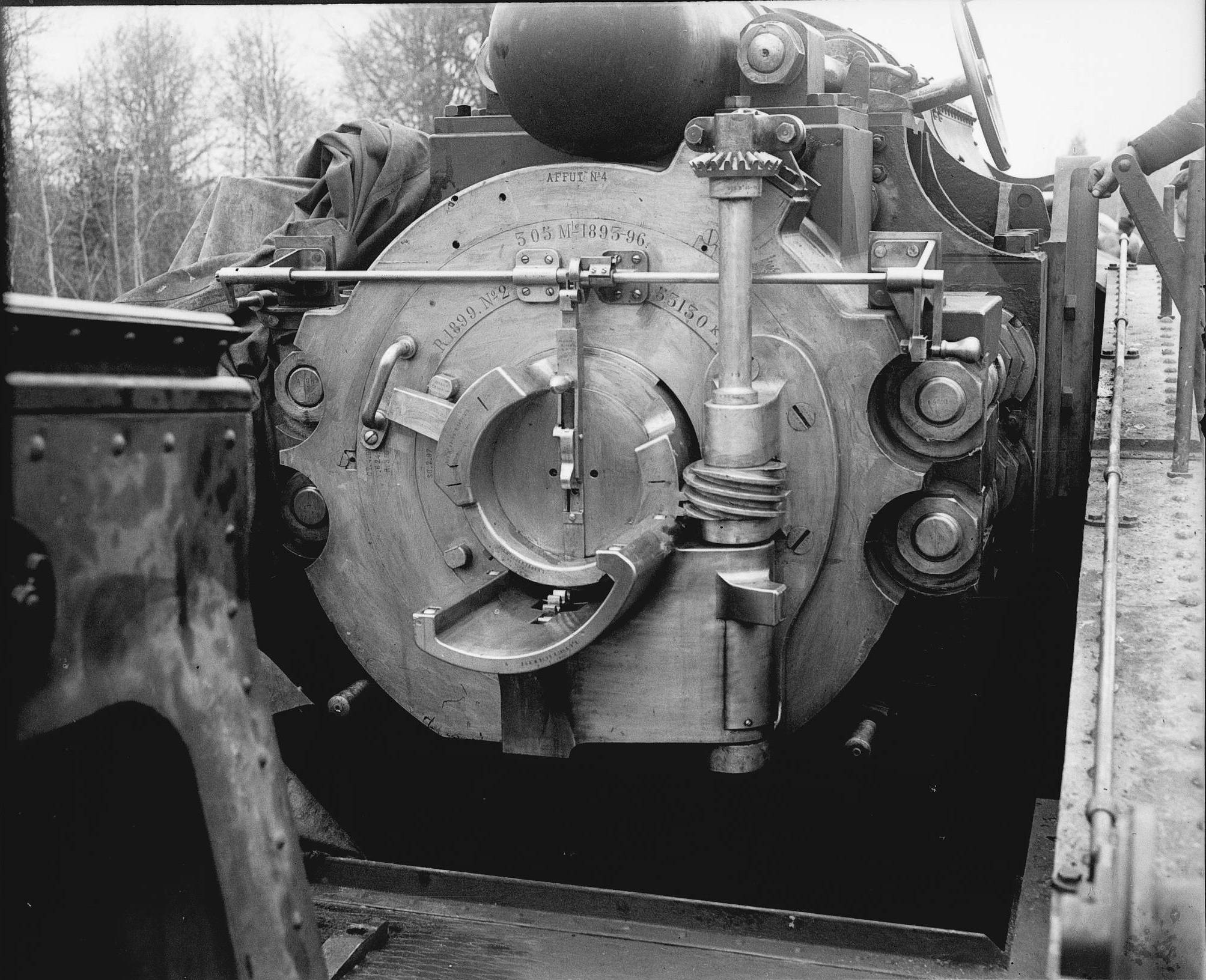
The breech of a gun.
