= 8-inch mortar M1877 =

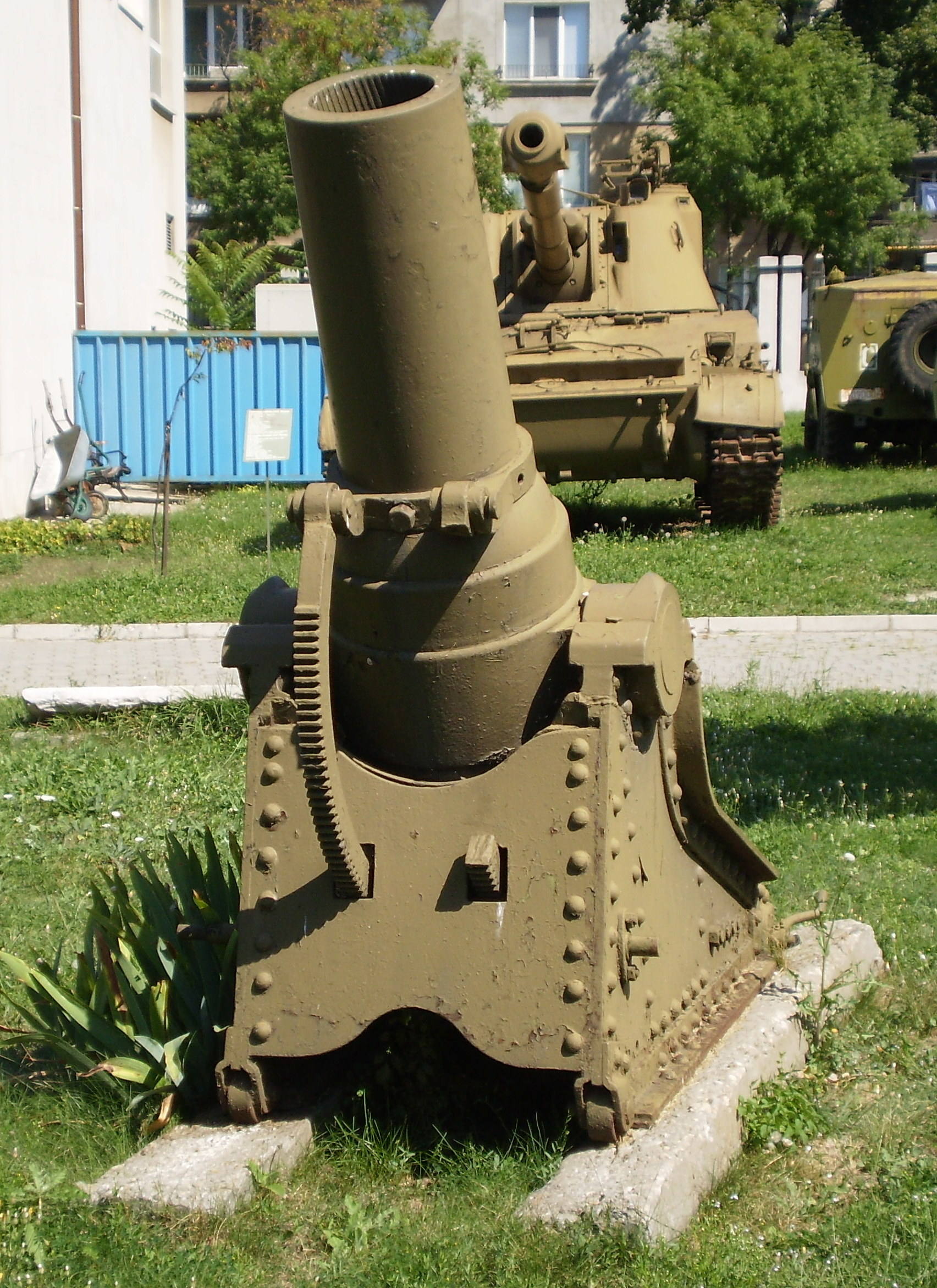
- A M1877 at the National Museum of Military History in Sofia.
- Type: Coastal artillery Fortress gun Siege gun
- Place of origin: Russian Empire

Service history
- In service: 1891-?
- Used by: Russian Empire; German Empire; Bulgaria; Finland
- Wars: Russo-Japanese War; World War I

Production history
- Designer: Obukhov State Plant
- Designed: 1877
- Manufacturer: Obukhov State Plant; Motovilikha Plants
- Produced: 1891

Specifications
- Mass: Travel: 8,500 kg (18,700 lb); Combat: 5,856 kg (12,910 lb)
- Barrel length: 3.4 m (11 ft) L/17 calibers
- Shell: Separate-loading, bagged charges and projectiles.
- Shell weight: 78–90 kg (172–198 lb)
- Caliber: 203 mm (8 in)
- Breech: Horizontal sliding-block
- Recoil: Hydro-gravity
- Carriage: Garrison mount
- Elevation: 0 to +42°
- Traverse: Dependent on mount
- Rate of fire: 1 round every 3 minutes
- Muzzle velocity: 400 m/s (1,300 ft/s)
- Maximum firing range: Russian ammunition: 6 km (3.7 mi); German ammunition: 9.6 km (6 mi)

The 8-inch mortar M1877 was a Russian 203 mm (8 in) coastal, fortress and siege mortar that was used in the Russo-Japanese War and World War I.

== History ==
The M1877 was first designed and produced by the Obukhov State Plant in Saint Petersburg. It was fairly conventional for its time; most nations had similar guns with similar roles, such as the Mortier de 220 mm modèle 1880 or Mortaio da 210/8 D.S.

== Design ==
The M1877 was a short barreled breech-loading mortar. The barrel was a typical built-up gun of the period with reinforcing hoops which was built from cast iron and steel. The mortar had an early form of Krupp horizontal sliding-block breech and it fired separate-loading, bagged charges and projectiles. There were also two other similar 229 mm (9 in) and 280 mm (11 in) mortars that were also designed in 1877.

=== Coastal Defense ===
In the coastal defense role, the M1877's theory of operation was that a low-velocity mortar firing a large shell at a high-angle was more likely to destroy an enemy ship by penetrating its thin deck armor than a high-velocity low-angle naval gun attempting to penetrate its thicker belt armor. The downside was that high-angle indirect fire was harder to aim correctly so more mortars would be needed to defend an area from attack. However, if the area was constrained by geography like a port at the mouth of a river the navigation channels could be measured ahead of time and firing ranges calculated. A complicating factor was as naval artillery progressed, their size and range soon eclipsed the mortar's range.

In the coastal defense role, the M1877 was mounted on a garrison mount which sat on a concrete slab behind a parapet. The mount consisted of a rectangular steel firing platform with a pivot at the front and two wheels at the rear to give a limited amount of traverse. The recoil system for the M1877 consisted of a U-shaped gun cradle which held the trunnioned barrel and a slightly inclined firing platform with a hydro-gravity recoil system. When the gun fired the hydraulic buffers under the front slowed the recoil of the cradle which slid up a set of inclined rails on the firing platform and then returned the gun to position by the combined action of the buffers and gravity. These garrison mounts were used in both the coastal defense and fortress gun roles.

=== Fortress Gun ===
In addition to its coastal defense role, the M1877 was also used as a fortress gun. The theory of operation was that a heavy mortar would be useful to defend forts because its large shell and high angle fire could destroy an enemies assault trenches during siege operations. The heavy shell and high angle fire would also be useful for counter-battery fire against enemy siege artillery.

=== Siege Gun ===
Another role for the M1877 was as a siege gun. The M1877 was designed with the lessons of the Franco-Prussian and Russo-Turkish war in mind where field guns with smaller shells and limited elevation had difficulty overcoming fortifications. What was needed was a mortar capable of high-angle fire which could fire a large shell to drop inside the walls of enemy fortifications to destroy enemy gun emplacements, command posts and magazines.

In the siege gun role, the gun cradle could be removed from its garrison mount and an axle with two wooden spoked wheels could be attached to the front. The rear of the cradle could then be hooked up to a limber so the mortar could be towed by a horse team or artillery tractor. To facilitate towing on soft ground the wheels were often fitted with Bonagente grousers patented by the Italian major Crispino Bonagente. These consisted of twelve rectangular plates connected with elastic links and are visible in many photographs of World War I artillery from all of the combatants. Once on site the axle could be removed and a set of small wheels could be fit to the front of the cradle. A piece of ground could then be leveled and a wooden firing platform assembled and the mortar placed on the firing platform. The firing platform had an external recoil mechanism which connected to a steel eye on the firing platform and a hook on the gun cradle between the wheels. Lastly, a set of wooden ramps were placed behind the wheels and when the gun fired the wheels rolled up the ramp and were returned to position by a combination of the buffers and gravity. However, there was no traversing mechanism and the gun had to be levered into position to aim. A drawback of this system was the gun had to be re-aimed each time which lowered the rate of fire.

== World War I ==
The majority of military planners before the First World War were wedded to the concept of fighting an offensive war of rapid maneuver which in a time before mechanization meant a focus on cavalry and light horse artillery firing shrapnel shells. Unlike the Western Front which quickly degenerated into Trench Warfare the Eastern Front remained fluid and large swathes of territory were won and lost because the length of the front and the sparseness of transport networks presented an open flank. Although the majority of combatants had heavy field artillery prior to the outbreak of the First World War, none had adequate numbers of heavy guns in service, nor had they foreseen the growing importance of heavy artillery. Since aircraft of the period were not yet capable of carrying large diameter bombs the burden of delivering heavy firepower fell on the artillery. The majority of combatants scrambled to find anything that could fire a heavy shell and that meant emptying the fortresses and scouring the arms depots for guns held in reserve.

It was under these conditions that M1877's in fortresses in European Russia were sent to the front in order to support Russian armies assaulting German and Austro-Hungarian frontier fortresses. However, due to a string of Russian defeats in the first year of the war, a number of M1877's were captured by the Germans. In 1916 the Germans transferred twenty M1877's to the Western Front where they were assigned to heavy artillery battalions of the army and these soldiered on in declining numbers until the end of the war. In German service the mortars had better range due to more efficient smokeless powder and more aerodynamic German projectiles.

== Photo Gallery ==
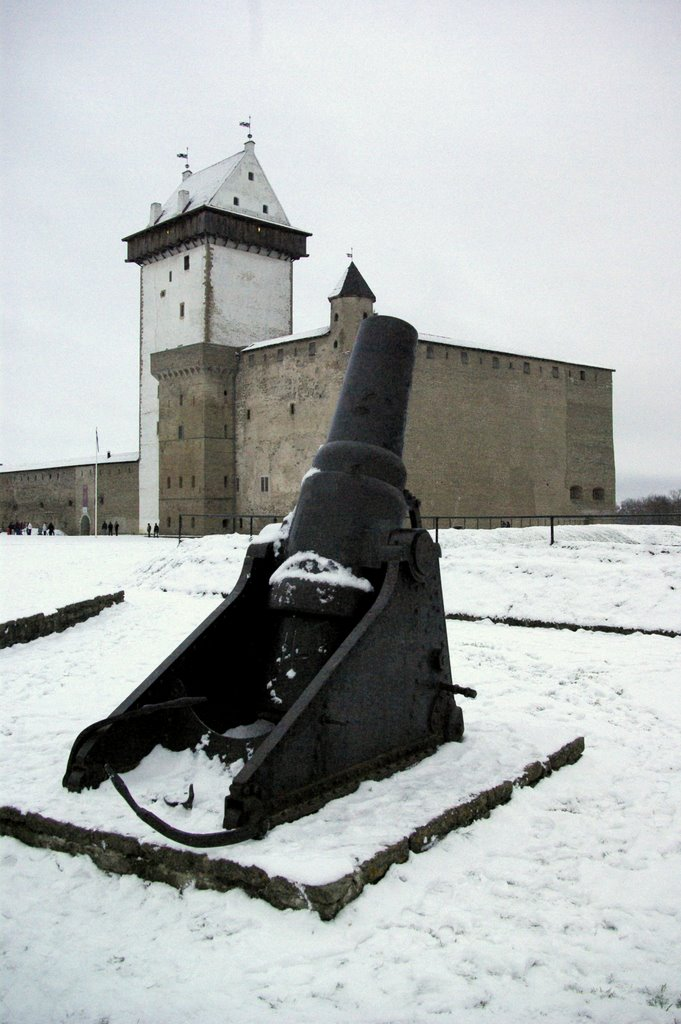
A 8-inch mortar M1877 at Hermann Fortress in Narva

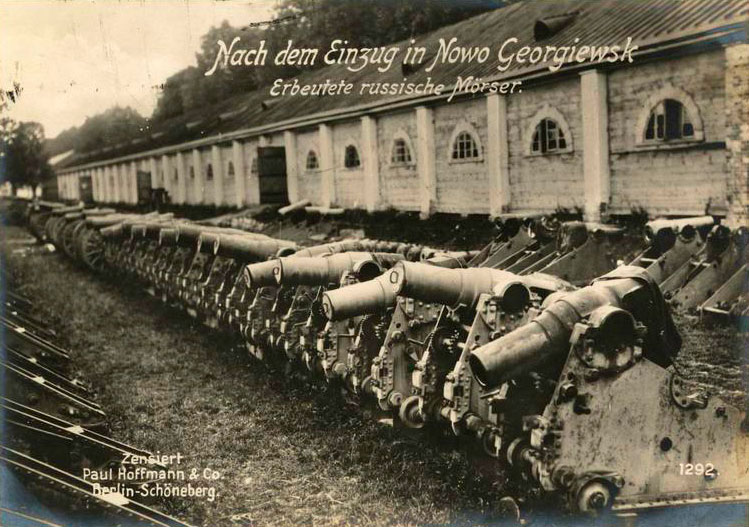
Russian 8-inch mortars captured during the Siege of Novogeorgievsk

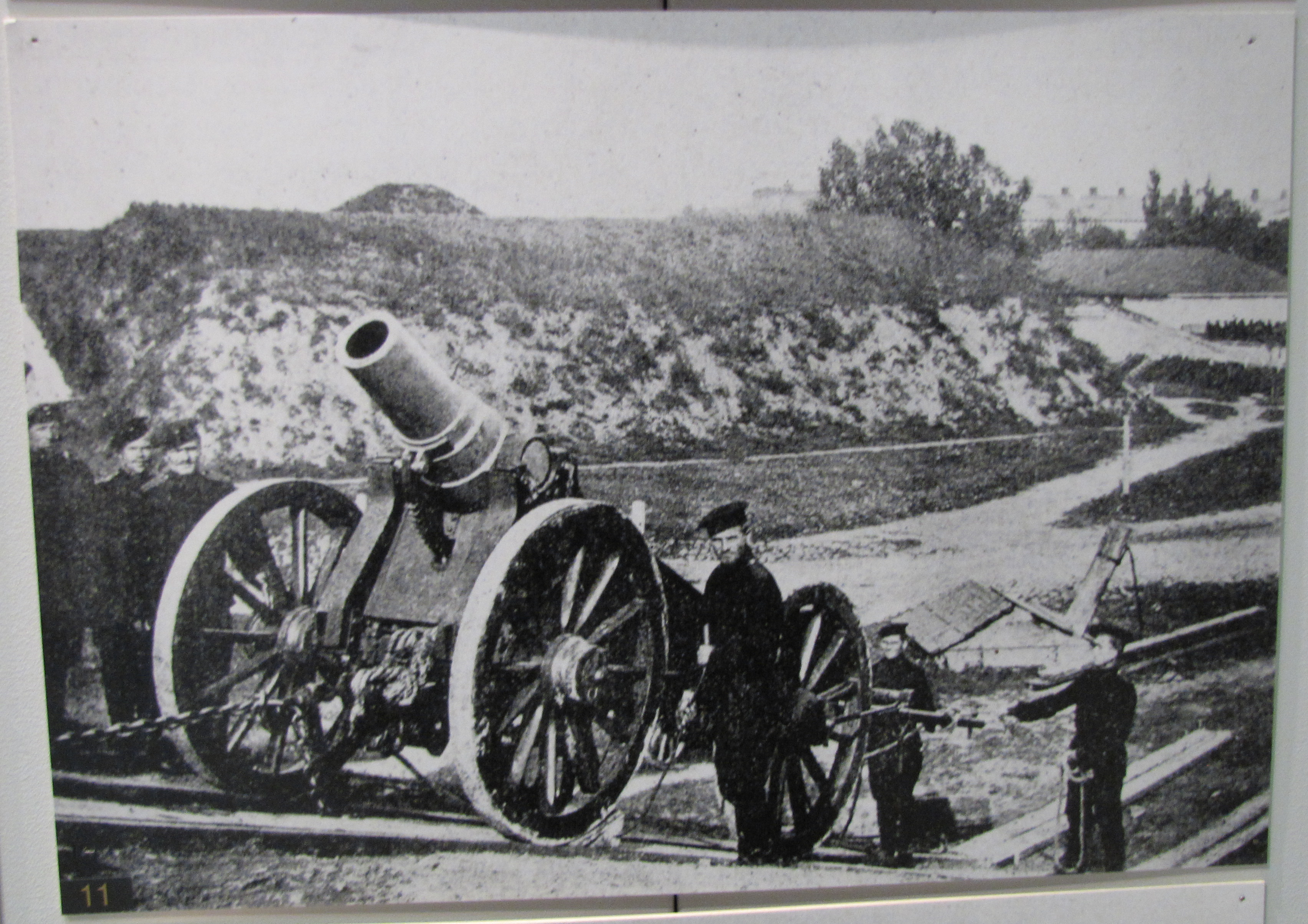
A 9-inch mortar being transported. The 8-inch could be transported in the same manner.

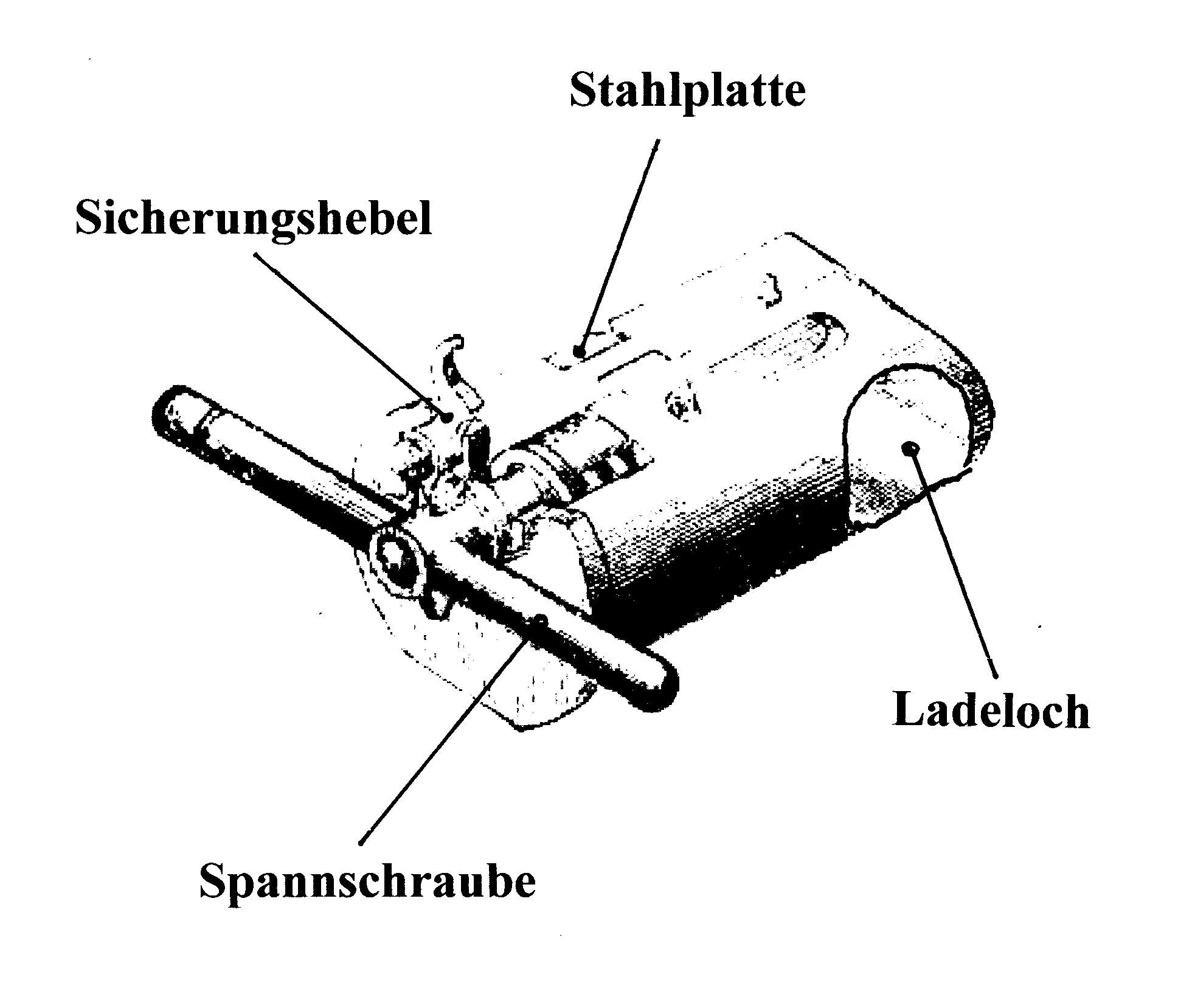
The M1877's breech block
