= 9-inch mortar M1877 =

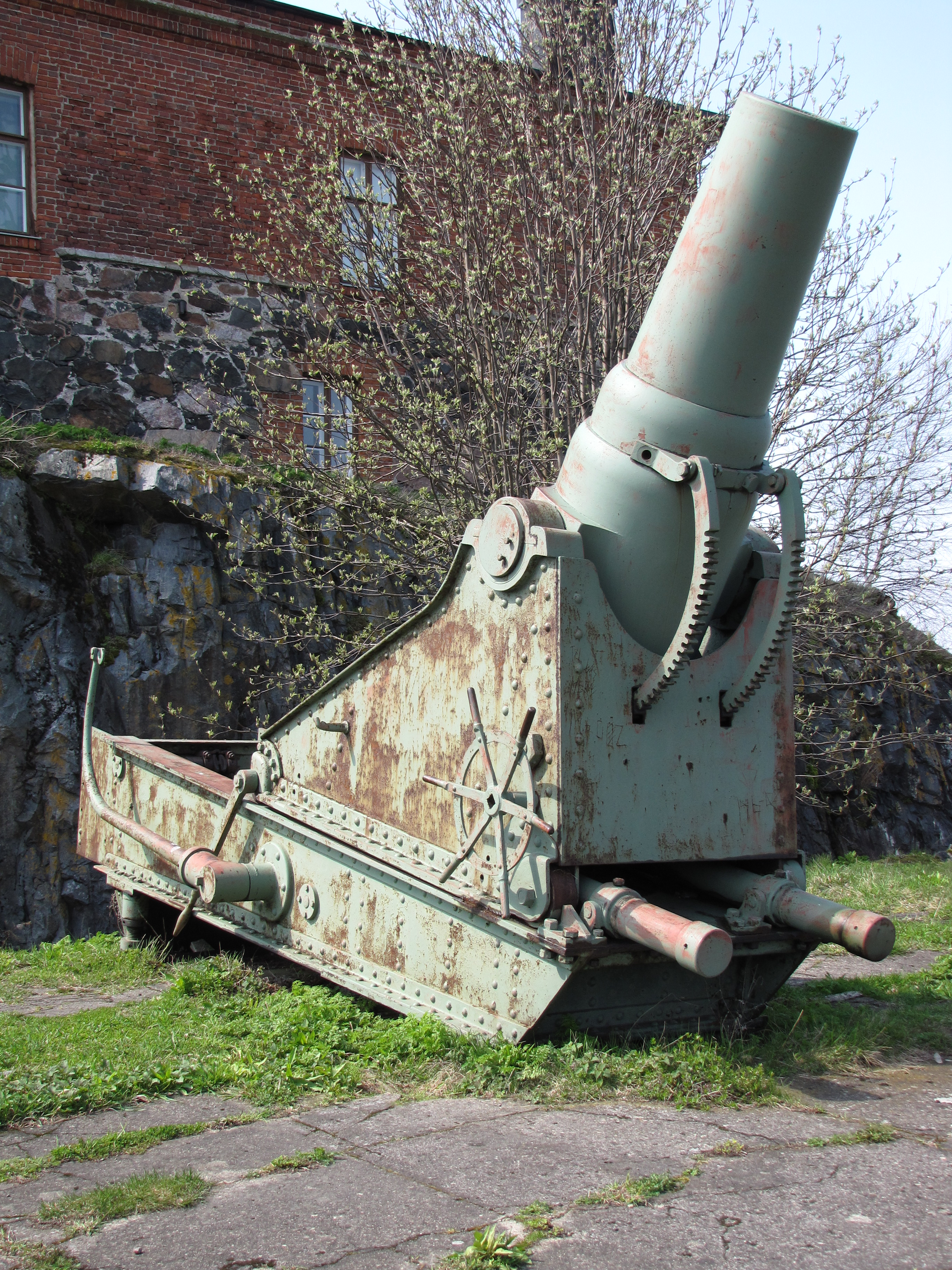
- A 9-inch coastal mortar at Suomenlinna.
- Type: Coastal artillery Fortress gun Siege gun
- Place of origin: Russian Empire

Service history
- In service: 1891–?
- Used by: Russian Empire; Finland
- Wars: Russo-Japanese War; World War I World War II

Production history
- Designer: Obukhov State Plant
- Designed: 1877
- Manufacturer: Obukhov State Plant; Motovilikha Plants
- Produced: 1891

Specifications
- Mass: 5,504 kg (12,134 lb)
- Barrel length: 2.7 m (8.9 ft) L/12 calibers
- Shell: Separate-loading, bagged charges and projectiles.
- Shell weight: 123–138 kg (271–304 lb)
- Caliber: 229 mm (9 in)
- Breech: Horizontal sliding-block
- Recoil: Hydro-gravity
- Carriage: Garrison mount
- Traverse: 360°
- Rate of fire: 1 round every 3 minutes
- Muzzle velocity: 335 m/s (1,100 ft/s)
- Maximum firing range: 7.4 km (4.6 mi)

The 9-inch mortar M1877 was a Russian 229 mm (9 in) coastal, fortress and siege mortar that was used in the Russo-Japanese War and World War I.

== History ==
The M1877 was first designed and produced by the Obukhov State Plant in Saint Petersburg and was fairly conventional for its time and most nations had similar guns with similar roles such as the Mortier de 220 mm modèle 1880 or Mortaio da 210/8 D.S.

== Design ==
The M1877 was a short barreled breech-loading mortar. The barrel was a typical built-up gun of the period with reinforcing hoops which was built from cast iron and steel. The mortar had an early form of Krupp horizontal sliding-block breech and it fired separate-loading, bagged charges and projectiles. There were also two other similar 203 mm (8 in) and 280 mm (11 in) mortars that were also designed in 1877.

=== Coastal Defense ===
In the coastal defense role, the M1877's theory of operation was that a low-velocity mortar firing a large shell at a high-angle was more likely to destroy an enemy ship by penetrating its thin deck armor than a high-velocity low-angle naval gun attempting to penetrate its thicker belt armor. The downside was that high-angle indirect fire was harder to aim correctly so more mortars would be needed to defend an area from attack. However, if the area was constrained by geography like a port at the mouth of a river the navigation channels could be measured ahead of time and firing ranges calculated. A complicating factor was as naval artillery progressed their size and range soon eclipsed the mortar's range.

In the coastal defense role, the M1877 was mounted on a garrison mount which sat on a concrete slab behind a parapet. The mount consisted of a rectangular steel firing platform with a pivot at the front and two wheels at the rear to give 360° of traverse. The recoil system for the M1877 consisted of a U-shaped gun cradle which held the trunnioned barrel and a slightly inclined firing platform with a hydro-gravity recoil system. When the gun fired the hydraulic buffers under the front slowed the recoil of the cradle which slid up a set of inclined rails on the firing platform and then returned the gun to position by the combined action of the buffers and gravity. These garrison mounts were used in both the coastal defense and fortress gun roles.

=== Fortress Gun ===
In addition to its coastal defense role, the M1877 was also used as a fortress gun. The theory of operation was that a heavy mortar would be useful to defend forts because its large shell and high angle fire could destroy an enemies assault trenches during siege operations. The heavy shell and high angle fire would also be useful for counter-battery fire against enemy siege artillery.

=== Siege Gun ===
Another role for the M1877 was as a siege gun. The M1877 was designed with the lessons of the Franco-Prussian and Russo-Turkish war in mind where field guns with smaller shells and limited elevation had difficulty overcoming fortifications. What was needed was a mortar capable of high-angle fire which could fire a large shell to drop inside the walls of enemy fortifications to destroy enemy gun emplacements, command posts and magazines.

In the siege gun role, the gun cradle could be removed from its garrison mount and an axle with two wooden spoked wheels could be attached to the front. The rear of the cradle could then be hooked up to a limber so the mortar could be towed by a horse team or artillery tractor. To facilitate towing on soft ground the wheels were often fitted with Bonagente grousers patented by the Italian major Crispino Bonagente. These consisted of twelve rectangular plates connected with elastic links and are visible in many photographs of World War I artillery from all of the combatants. Once on site, the axle could be removed and a set of small wheels could be fit to the front of the cradle. A piece of ground could then be leveled and a wooden firing platform assembled and the mortar placed on the firing platform. The firing platform had an external recoil mechanism which connected to a steel eye on the firing platform and a hook on the gun cradle between the wheels. Lastly, a set of wooden ramps were placed behind the wheels and when the gun fired the wheels rolled up the ramp and was returned to position by a combination of the buffers and gravity. However, there was no traversing mechanism and the gun had to be levered into position to aim. A drawback of this system was the gun had to be re-aimed each time which lowered the rate of fire. Due to the weight of the mortar it may have not been used in the siege role very often.

== Photo Gallery ==
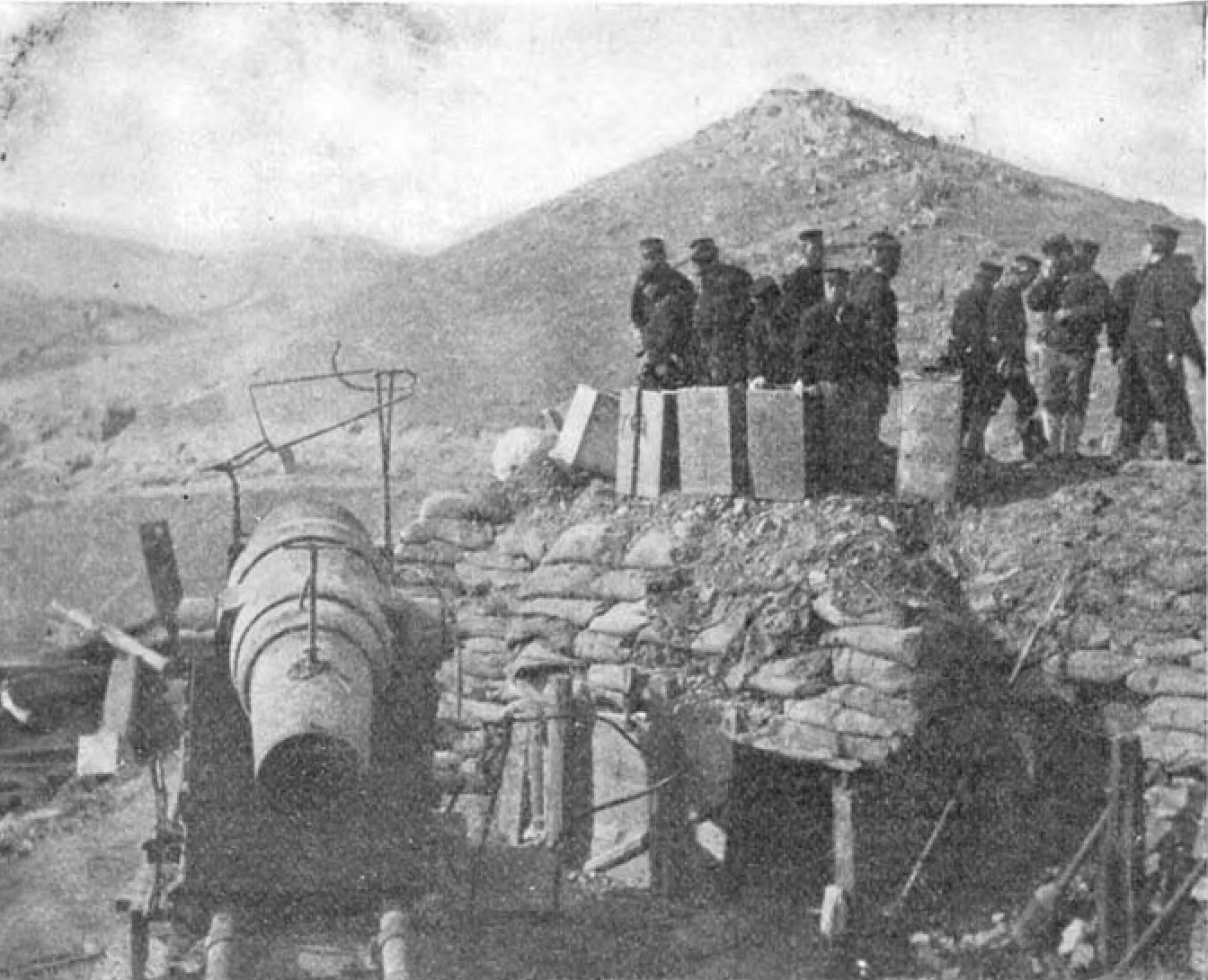
A 9-inch mortar captured by the Japanese at Port Arthur.

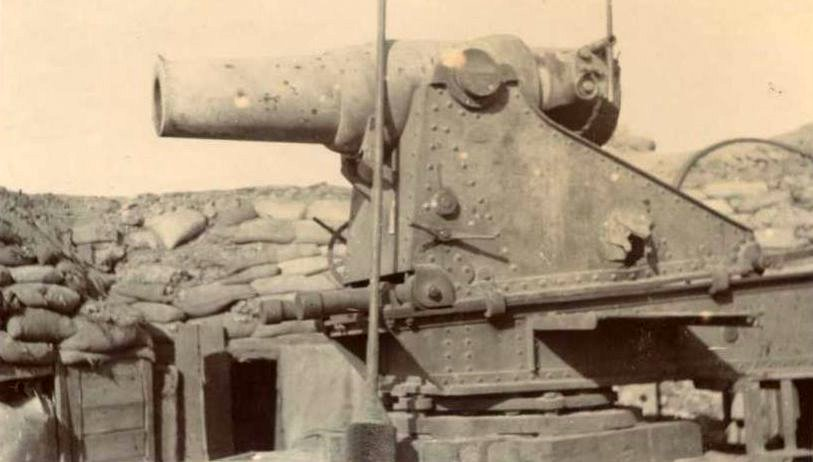
A 9-inch mortar captured by the Japanese at Port Arthur.

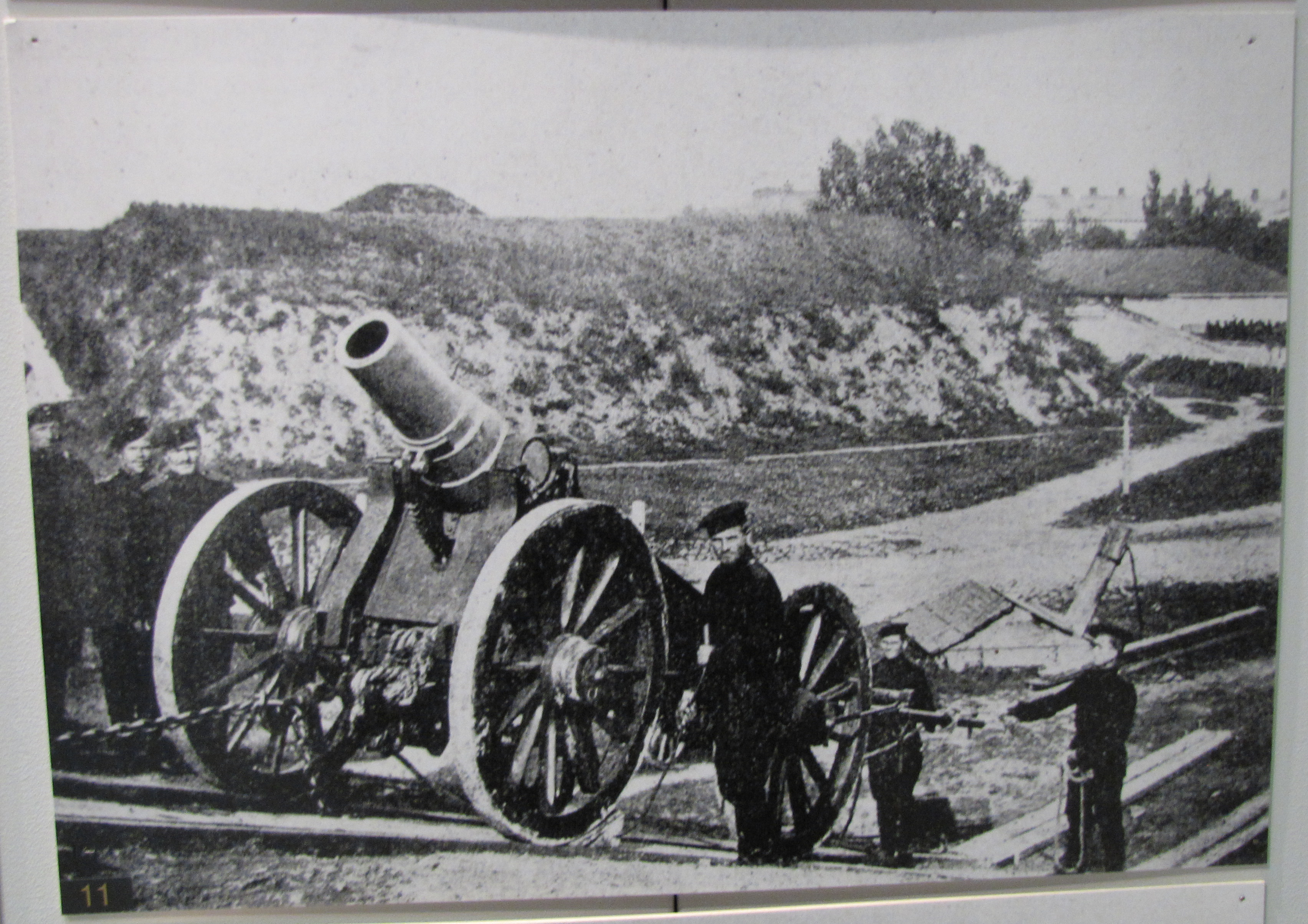
A 9-inch mortar being transported.

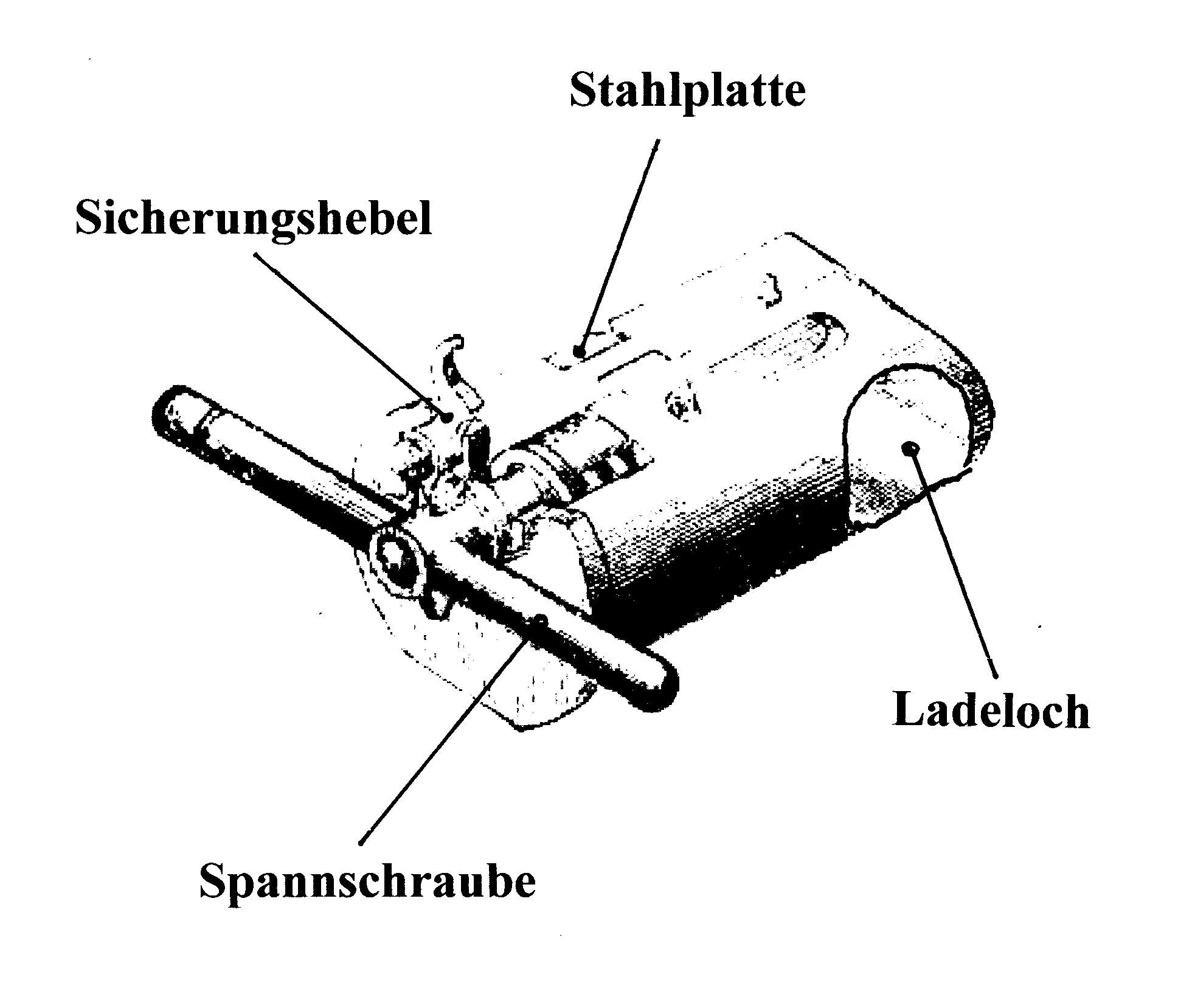
The M1877's breech block.
