= 6-inch siege gun M1877 =

6-inch siege gun model 1877
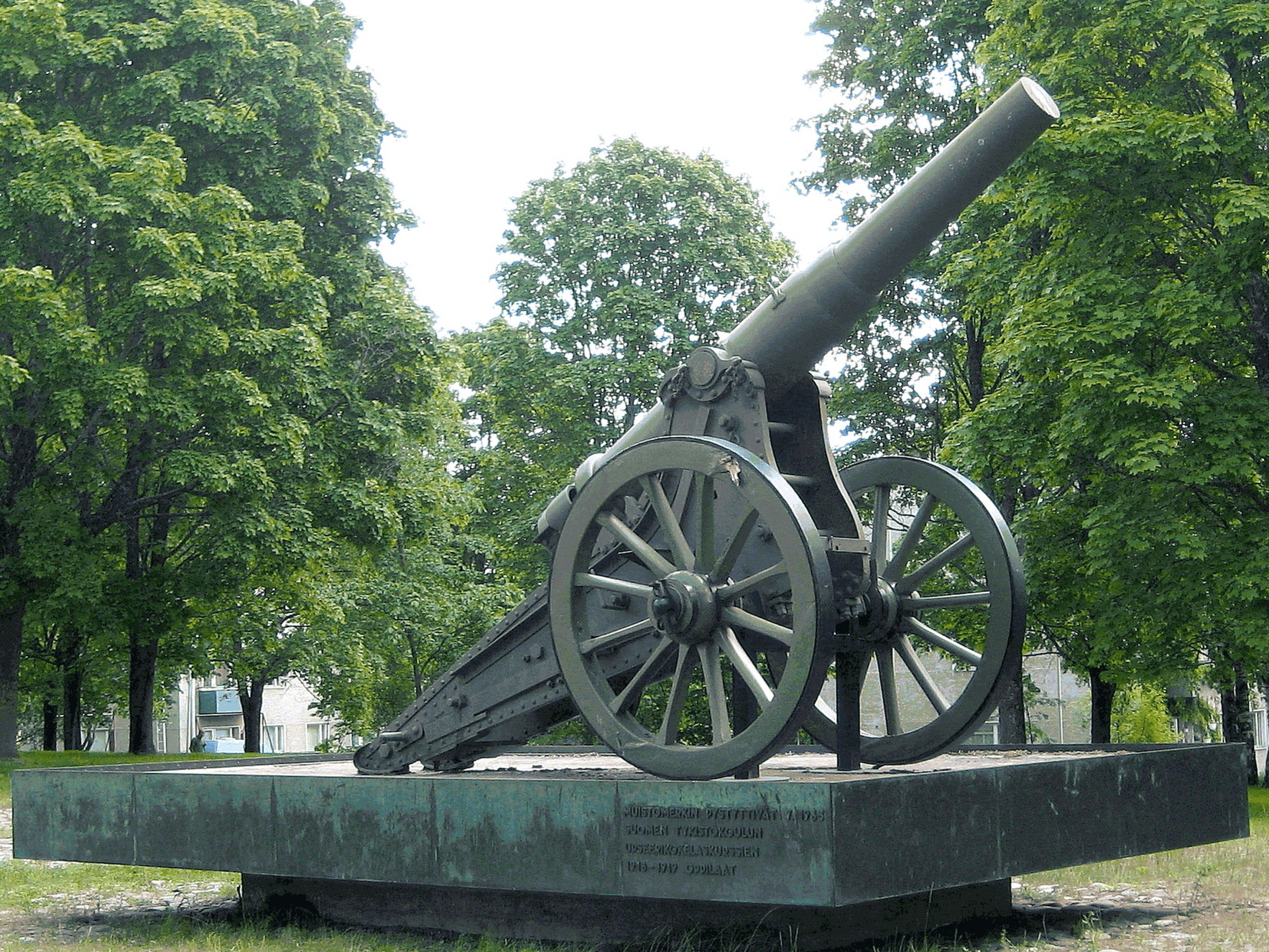
- A M1877 with a 120 pood barrel at the Artillery School, Lappeenranta, Finland.
- Type: Fortress Gun; Siege gun
- Place of origin: Russian Empire

Service history
- Used by: See § Users
- Wars: See § Wars

Production history
- Designed: 1877
- Manufacturer: Obukhov State Plant; Motovilikha Plants
- Produced: 1877
- No. built: 1,370
- Variants: Coastal artillery

Specifications
- Mass: Combat: 5,300 kg (11,700 lb); Platform: 6,660 kg (14,680 lb)
- Barrel length: 3.6 m (12 ft) L/22 calibers
- Shell: Separate-loading, bagged charges and projectiles.
- Shell weight: See ammunition
- Caliber: 152.4 mm (6 in)
- Breech: Horizontal sliding-block
- Recoil: None
- Carriage: Box trail
- Elevation: -16° to +38°
- Traverse: None
- Muzzle velocity: See ammunition
- Maximum firing range: See ammunition

The 6-inch siege gun model 1877 (Russian: 6-дюймовая осадная пушка образца 1877 года) was a Russian 152.4 mm (6 in) fortress gun, siege gun and coastal defense gun. It was used in the Russo-Japanese War, World War I, and the Russian Civil War. The successor states of the Russian Empire also inherited a number of M1877 guns.

== History ==
The M1877 was designed by the Mikhailovsky Artillery Academy in 1875 and produced by Obukhov State Plant in Saint Petersburg and later at Motovilikha Plants in Perm that entered service in 1877. The M1877 was fairly conventional for its time and most nations had similar guns. However, its lack of recoil mechanism made it dated by the time the First World War broke out. Most were assigned to defend Russian forts when the First World War broke out. The M1877 was designed with the lessons of the Franco-Prussian and Russo-Turkish war in mind where field guns with smaller shells and limited elevation had difficulty overcoming fortifications. What was needed was a howitzer capable of high-angle fire which could fire a large shell to drop inside the walls of enemy fortifications.

== Design ==
The M1877 was a short barreled breech-loading cannon on a rigid two-wheeled box trail carriage. The barrel was a typical built-up gun of the period with reinforcing hoops and all steel construction. The gun had an early form of Krupp horizontal sliding-block breech and it fired separate-loading, bagged charges and projectiles. There were two versions of the M1877 that were differentiated by their barrel length and weight 120 or 190 pood. 1 pood = 16.38 kg (36.1 lb) so the 120 pood barrel weighed 1,965 kg (4,332 lb) VS 3,112 kg (6,861 lb). The picture and information in the infobox correspond to the 120 pood version.

Like many of its contemporaries, the M1877 carriage was tall and narrow because the guns were designed to sit behind a parapet in a fortress with the barrel overhanging the front. Since the guns weren't expected to go very far they weren't designed with mobility in mind. Like many of its contemporaries, its carriage did not have a recoil mechanism. However, when used in a fortress the guns could be connected to an external recoil mechanism which connected to a steel eye on the firing platform and a hook on the carriage between the wheels. Unfortunately, the M1877 was heavy and its recoil made it hard to control so a wooden firing platform with a recoil mechanism that weighed 6,660 kg (14,680 lb) needed to be assembled before field use. A set of wooden ramps were also placed behind the wheels and when the gun fired the wheels rolled up the ramp and was returned to position by gravity. There was also no traversing mechanism and the gun had to be levered into position to aim. A drawback of this system was the gun had to be re-aimed each time which lowered the rate of fire.

To facilitate towing on soft ground and lessen recoil the wheels were often fitted with Bonagente grousers patented by the Italian major Crispino Bonagente. These consisted of twelve rectangular plates connected with elastic links and are visible in many photographs of World War I artillery from all of the combatants. For towing the tail of the gun hooked onto a limber for towing by a horse team or artillery tractor.

== Coastal Artillery ==
In addition to its fortress and siege gun roles, there was also a coastal defense version on a garrison mount with limited traverse. The recoil system for this version consisted of a U-shaped gun cradle which held the trunnioned barrel and a slightly inclined firing platform with a hydro-gravity recoil system. When the gun fired a hydraulic buffer slowed the recoil of the cradle which slid up a set of inclined rails on the firing platform and then returned the gun to position by the combined action of the buffers and gravity.

== World War I ==
The majority of military planners before the First World War were wedded to the concept of fighting an offensive war of rapid maneuver which in a time before mechanization meant a focus on cavalry and light horse artillery firing shrapnel shells. Unlike the Western Front which quickly degenerated into Trench Warfare the Eastern Front remained fluid and large swathes of territory were won and lost because the length of the front and the sparseness of transport networks presented an open flank. Although the majority of combatants had heavy field artillery prior to the outbreak of the First World War, none had adequate numbers of heavy guns in service, nor had they foreseen the growing importance of heavy artillery. Since aircraft of the period were not yet capable of carrying large diameter bombs the burden of delivering heavy firepower fell on the artillery. The majority of combatants scrambled to find anything that could fire a heavy shell and that meant emptying the fortresses and scouring the arms depots for guns held in reserve.

It was under these conditions that 496 M1877's in fortresses in European Russia were sent to the front in order to support Russian armies assaulting German and Austro-Hungarian frontier fortresses. However, due to a string of Russian defeats in the first year of the war large numbers of M1877's were captured by the Germans due to their lack of mobility. The Germans transferred a number of these guns to the Western Front where they were assigned to heavy artillery battalions of the army in order to replace losses suffered during the first two years of the war.

== World War II ==
An unknown number of M1877's were still in use by the Soviet training, reserve and coastal defense units during World War II. The last documented usage was in 1941 during Operation Barbarossa when due to a lack of suitable anti-tank guns twelve were removed from the Dzerzhinsky Military Academy in Moscow and participated in the defense of Moscow. These guns closed a gap in the defenses of the Soviet 16th Army under the command of K. K. Rokossovsky during the Battle of Moscow in the Solnechnogorsk and Krasnaya Polyana area. The guns were dug into revetments to cover the approaches to Moscow and the gun crews had to aim via boresight since they lacked sights for direct fire. Despite this, they were successful in the anti-tank role out to 500–600 m (1,600–2,000 ft) range.

== Ammunition ==
The M1877 was able to fire a variety of different types of projectiles segregated by the type of propellant used.

Black Powder:

- Cast Iron HE - 33.3 kg (73 lb) projectile, 3.48 kg (7 lb 11 oz) bagged charge, 332 m/s (1,090 ft/s) muzzle velocity and 7.3 km (4.5 mi) range.
- Cast Iron Shrapnel - 35 kg (77 lb) projectile with 630 balls, 3.48 kg (7 lb 11 oz) bagged charge, and 381 m/s (1,250 ft/s) muzzle velocity.

Smokeless Powder:

- HE - 41 kg (90 lb) projectile with 8.8 kg (19 lb 6 oz) TNT filling, 381 m/s (1,250 ft/s) muzzle velocity and 8.5 km (5.3 mi) range.
- Chemical - 40 kg (88 lb) projectile.
- Illumination - 26.6 kg (59 lb) projectile.
- Long Range HE - 40 kg (88 lb) projectile with 6.9 kg (15 lb 3 oz) TNT filling, 410 m/s (1,300 ft/s) muzzle velocity and 10.3 km (6.4 mi) range.

== Users ==
- Estonia
- Finland
- German Empire
- Latvia
- Lithuania
- Poland
- Russian Empire

== Wars ==
- Russo-Japanese War
- World War I
- Finnish Civil War
- Russian Civil War
- Polish–Soviet War
- Winter War
- World War II

== Photo Gallery ==
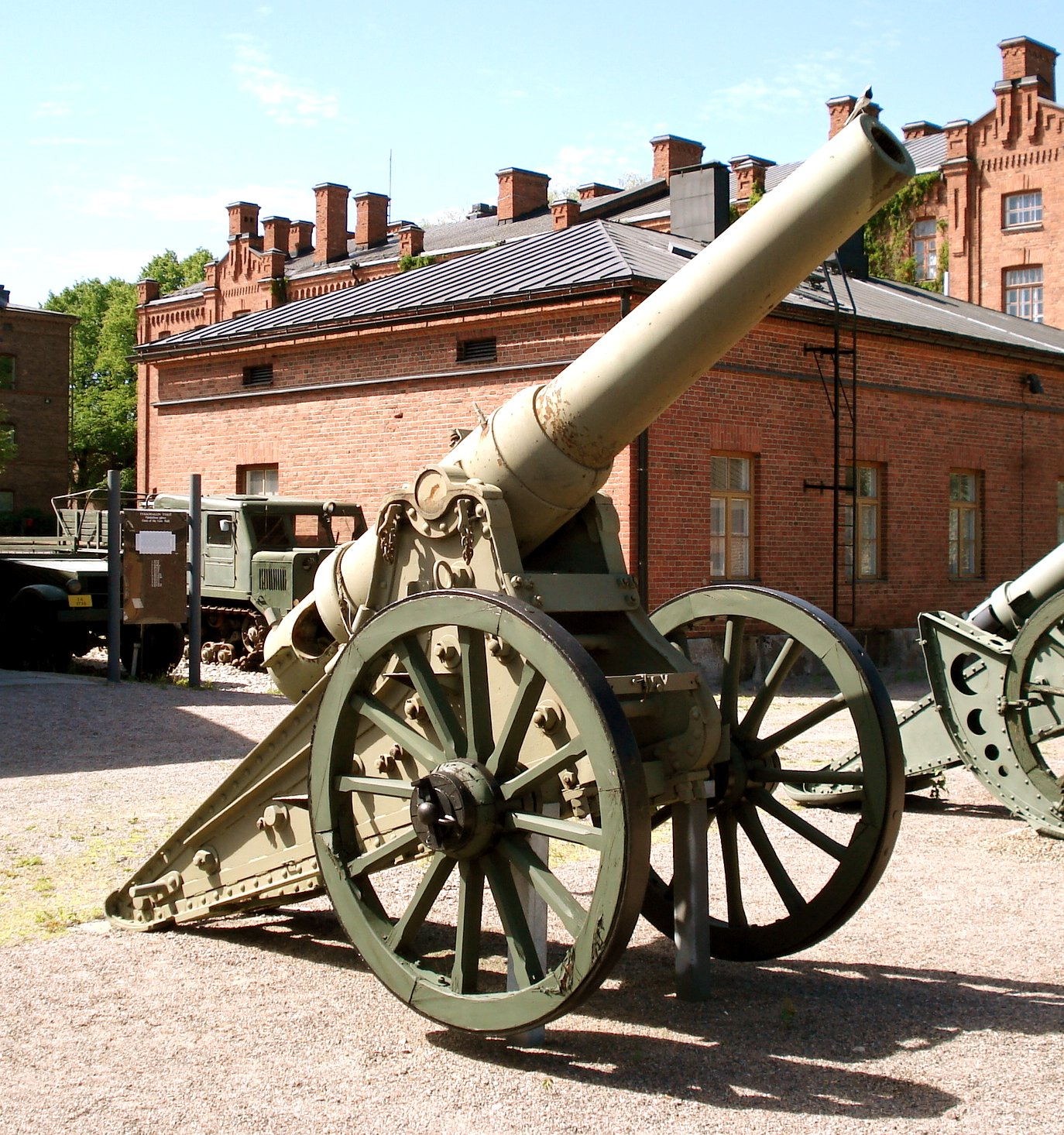
A M1877 with 190 pood barrel, displayed in Hämeenlinna The Artillery Museum of Finland.

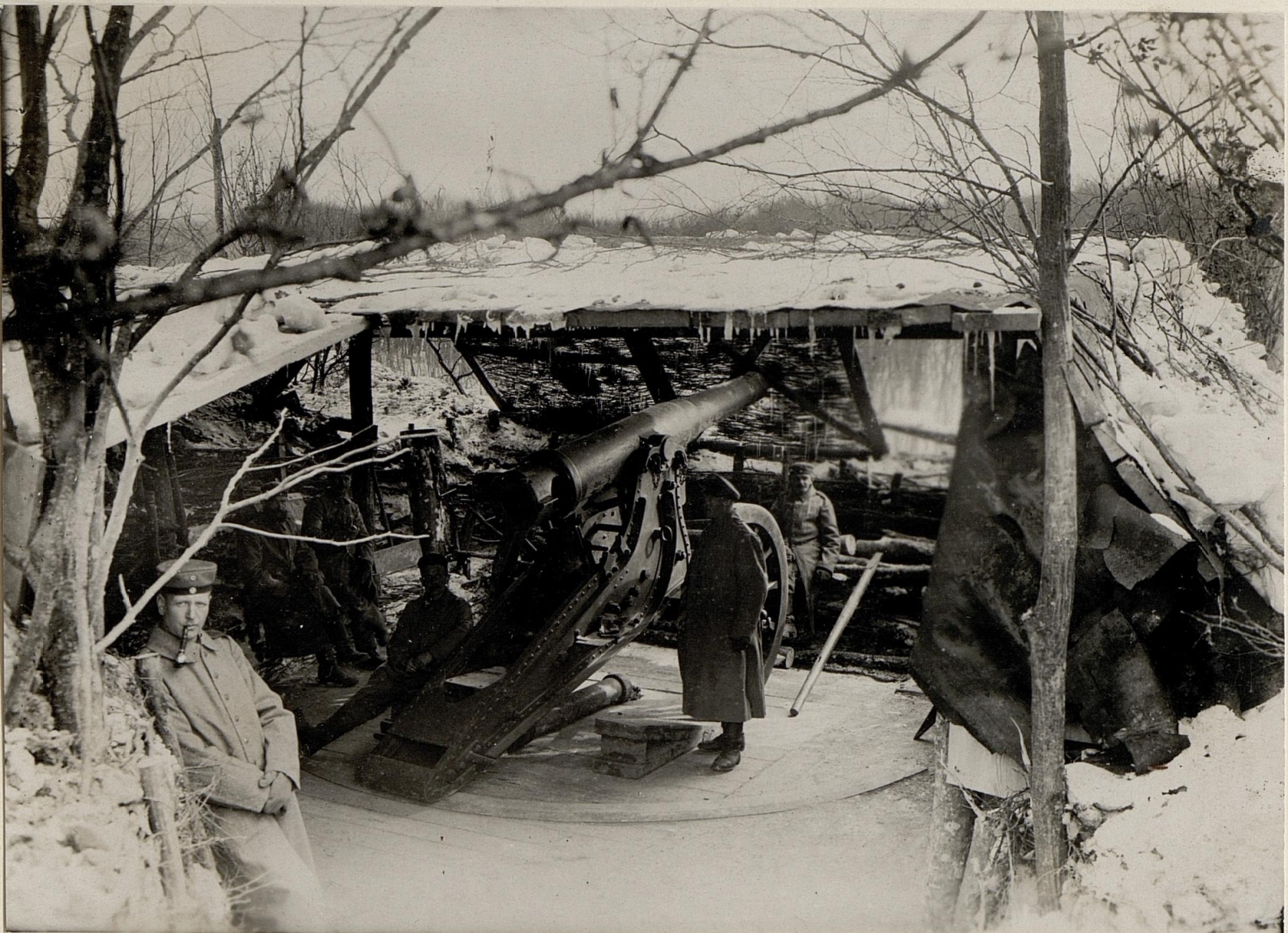
A captured M1877 in German service with battery 646. Note the recoil cylinder attached to the wooden firing platform.

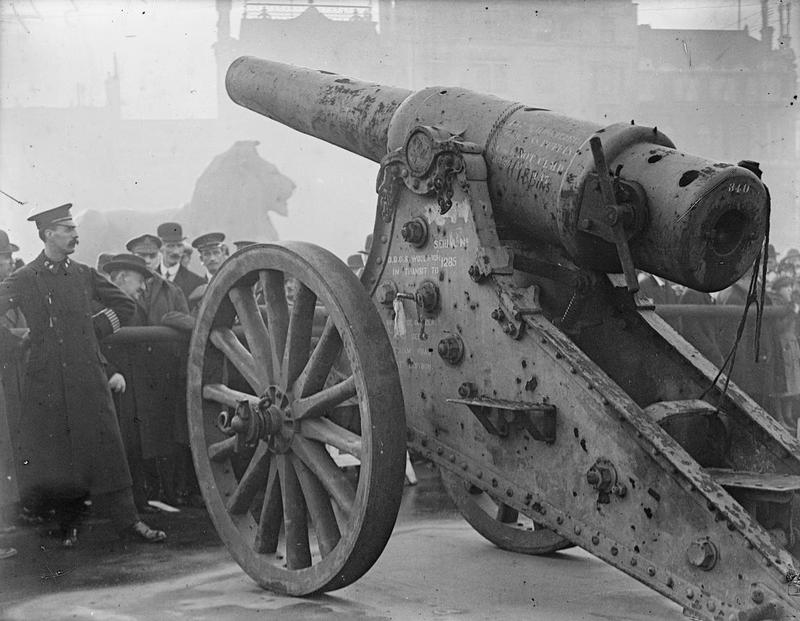
A M1877 captured by the British during Battle of the Somme.

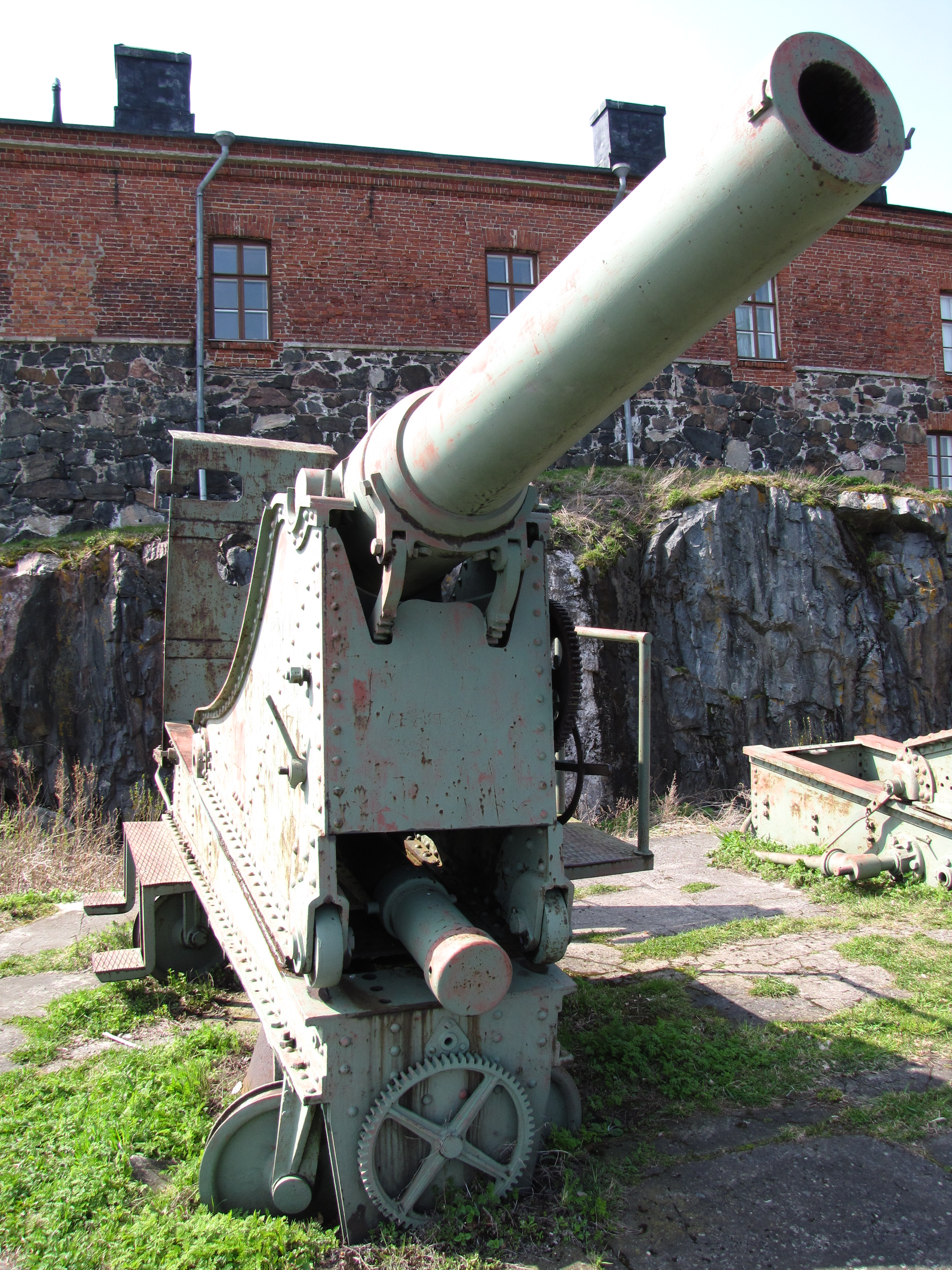
A M1877 on a coastal artillery mount at Suomenlinna. Note the recoil cylinder under the gun cradle.

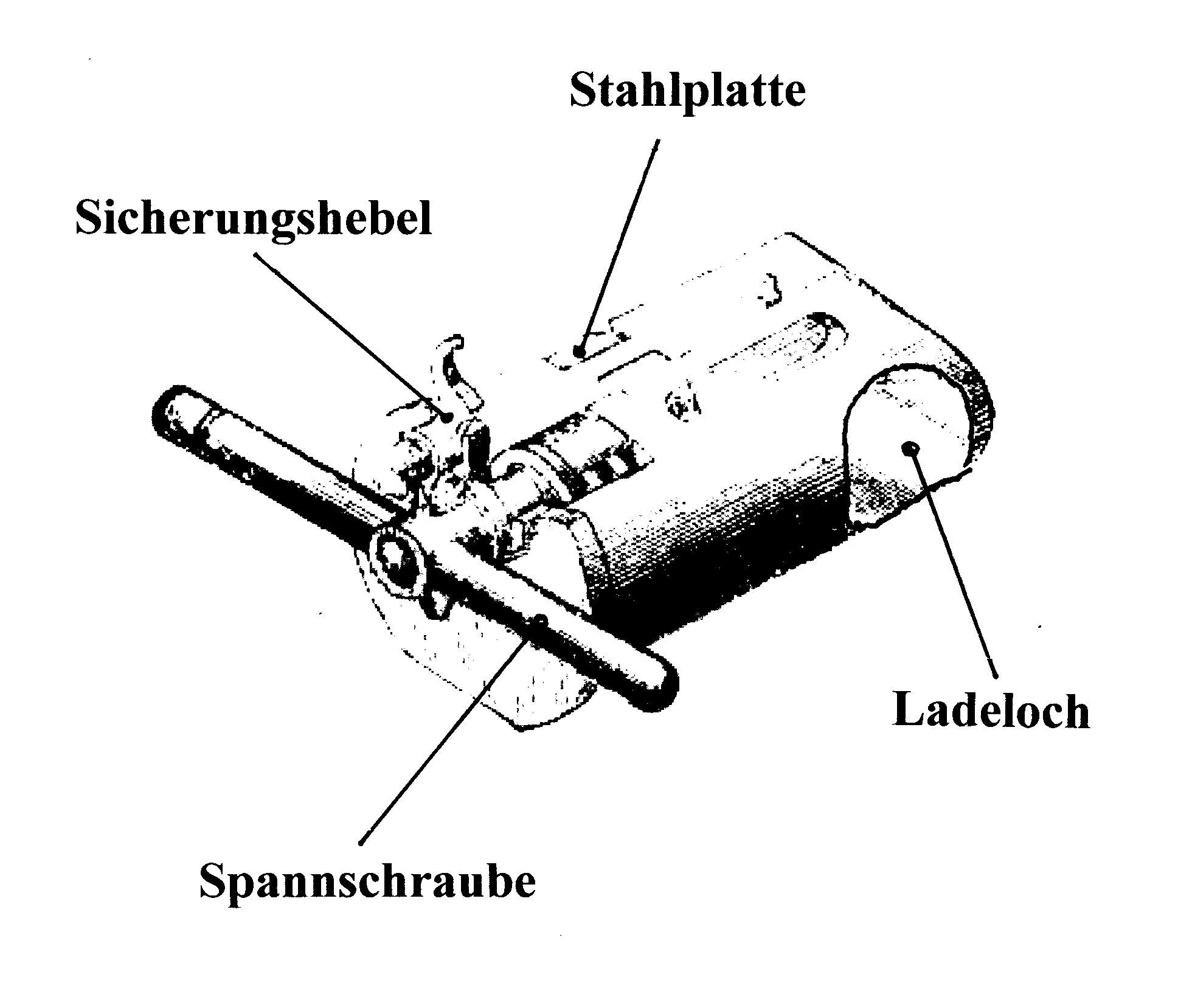
The M1877's breech block.
