= Canon de 19 C modèle 1875 =

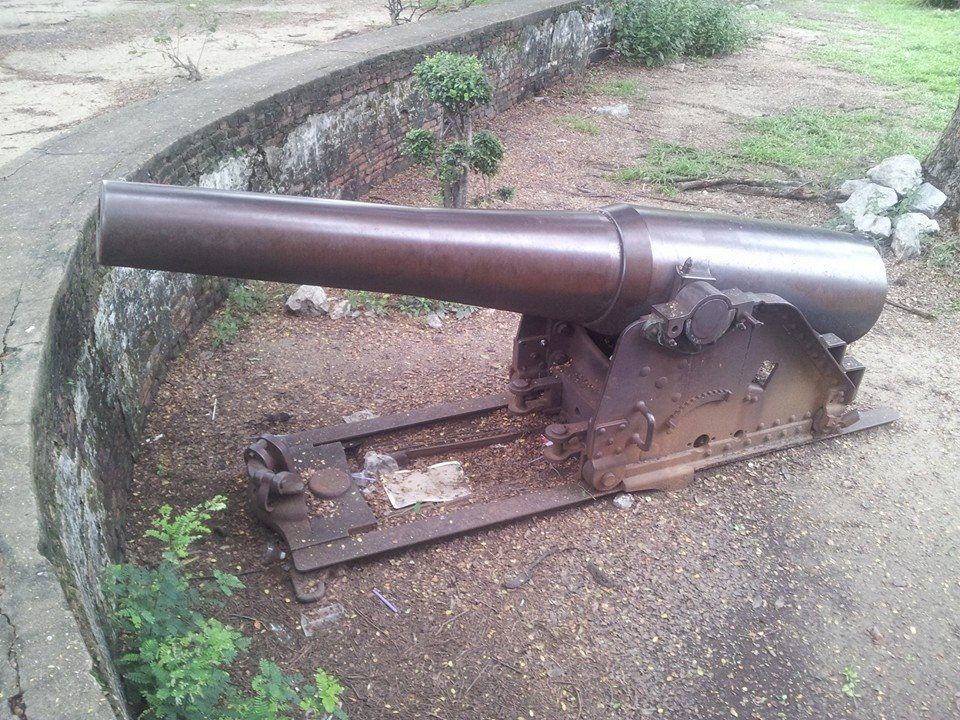
- A coastal defense gun at Plaeng Fai Fah Fort, Thailand.
- Type: Coastal artillery
- Place of origin: France

Service history
- In service: 1875–1945
- Used by: See § Users
- Wars: World War I

Production history
- Designed: 1875
- Produced: 1875
- Variants: Railway gun

Specifications
- Mass: Complete: 15.3 t (15.1 long tons; 16.9 short tons); Carriage: 7.3 t (7.2 long tons; 8.0 short tons); Barrel: 8 t (7.9 long tons; 8.8 short tons)
- Barrel length: 7.2 m (24 ft) L/37
- Shell: Separate-loading, bagged charge and projectiles
- Shell weight: 85 kg (187 lb)
- Caliber: 194 mm (7.6 in)
- Breech: de Bange
- Recoil: Hydro-gravity
- Elevation: -6° to +30°
- Traverse: 360°
- Muzzle velocity: 470 m/s (1,500 ft/s)
- Maximum firing range: 15 km (9.3 mi)

The Canon de 19 C modèle 1875 was a coastal defense gun designed and built in the 1870s. A number of guns were also converted to railway guns during World War I in order to meet a need for heavy artillery.

== Design ==
The Canon de 19 C modèle 1875 were typical built-up guns of the period with mixed construction consisting of a rifled steel liner and several layers of iron reinforcing hoops. In French service guns of mixed steel/iron construction were designated in centimeters while all steel guns were designated in millimeters. However, reference materials do not always distinguish the difference in construction and use either unit of measurement. The guns used a de Bange breech and fired separate loading bagged charges and projectiles.

The mle 1875 was mounted on a number of different models of garrison mounts with limited traverse. One exception was the GPC mount which was a rectangular steel firing platform which sat on top of a large circular steel track embedded in concrete behind a parapet. A rectangular steel firing platform with four wheels rotated on the track and gave 360° of traverse.

The recoil system for the mle 1875 consisted of a U-shaped gun cradle which held the trunnioned barrel and a slightly inclined firing platform with a hydro-gravity recoil system. When the gun fired the hydraulic buffers slowed the recoil of the cradle which slid up a set of inclined rails on the firing platform and then returned the gun to position by the combined action of the buffers and gravity.

== Railway guns ==
In order to address a need for heavy artillery a number of mle 1875's were converted to railway guns. The conversion entailed removing the gun cradle from its carriage and mounting it on one of three different types of rail carriage.

Carriage Types:

- The first designated 19 cm Canon G modèle 1916 was a convertible two-axle Schneider design that allowed the rail bogies to be replaced with road wheels so it could be towed by an artillery tractor to the front. This version retained the inclined hydro-gravity recoil system of its predecessor and its rear axle was taller than the front to assist returning the gun to battery after firing. This carriage had three wooden beams attached to the axles which were lowered to lay across the tracks by screw jacks to take weight off of the axles. Elevation was +40° and range was 12.9 km (8 mi) but there was no traverse so in order to aim the gun had to be drawn across a section of curved track. All versions had an attachment at the front of the carriage for a tie bar which attached to an earth anchor to help anchor the guns in place and an ammunition hoist on the rear of the carriage. On November 11, 1917, there were fifty mle 1916's in service.
- The second designated 19 cm Canon G modèle 1917 was a simpler two-axle flatbed carriage built from steel I beams and timbers. On this carriage, the gun cradle was mounted horizontally with a hydro-spring recoil system where the hydraulic buffer absorbed the recoil and a spring (or a system of hundreds of rubber bands, adopted due to spring breakage in cold weather) returned the gun to battery after firing. This carriage had three wooden beams attached to the center of the wagon which were lowered to lay across the tracks by screw jacks to take weight off of the axles. Elevation was largely the same as mle 1916 but there was no traverse so in order to aim the gun had to be drawn across a section of curved track or placed on a turntable which took two days to assemble before use. On November 11, 1918, there were twenty-eight mle 1917's in service.
- Lastly, there was a simple three-axle flatbed carriage built from steel I beams and timbers. This version retained the inclined hydro-gravity recoil system of its predecessor. This carriage had three wooden beams with one between each axle which were lowered lay across the tracks by screw jacks to take weight off of the axles. Elevation was largely the same as the other versions but there was no traverse so in order to aim the gun had to be drawn across a section of curved track.

== United States service ==
During World War I several US Army railway artillery units in France used this weapon, commonly called the "19-G". One of these was the 43rd Artillery, Coast Artillery Corps.

== Users ==
- France
- United States

== Photo Gallery ==
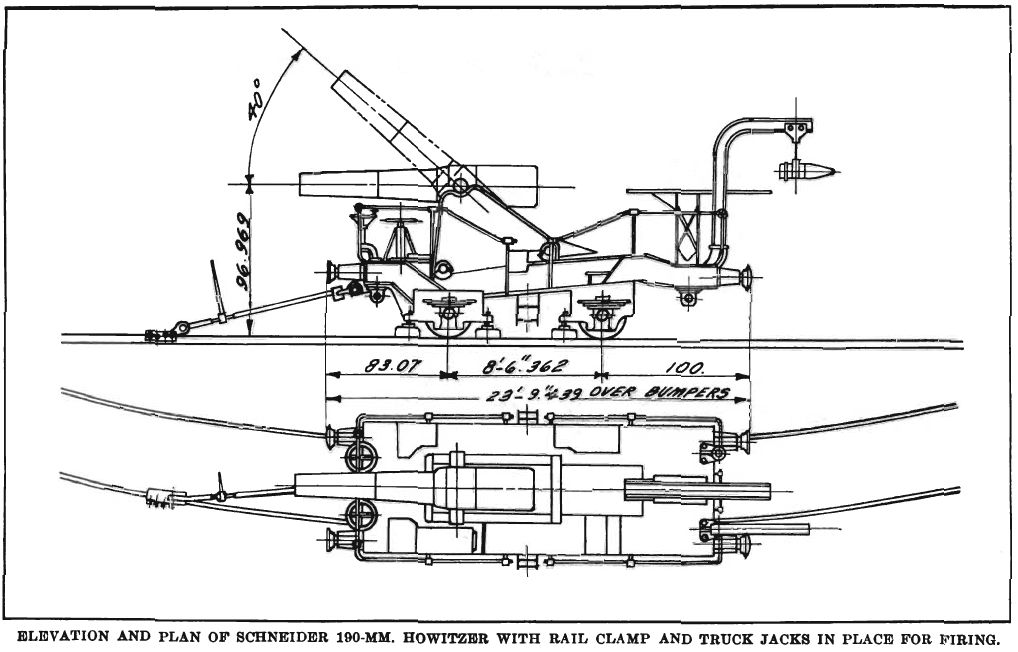
A line drawing of a mle 1916 two-axle carriage.

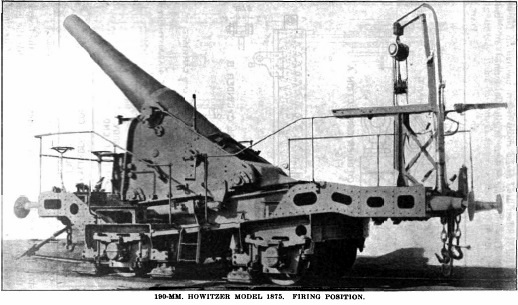
A mle 1916 in firing position.

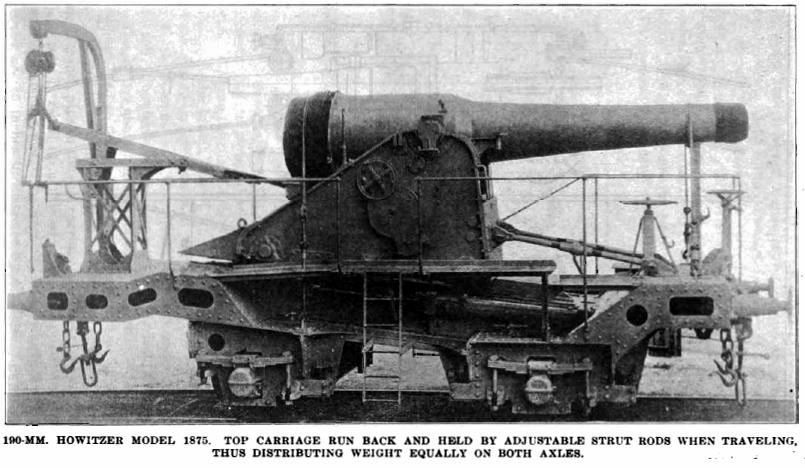
A mle 1916 in traveling position.

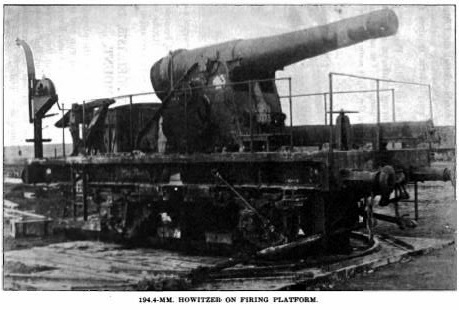
A mle 1917 two-axle carriage on a turntable.

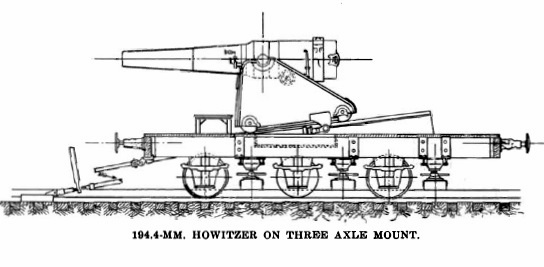
A line drawing of a three-axle carriage variant.
