= 11-inch mortar M1877 =

Russian mortar

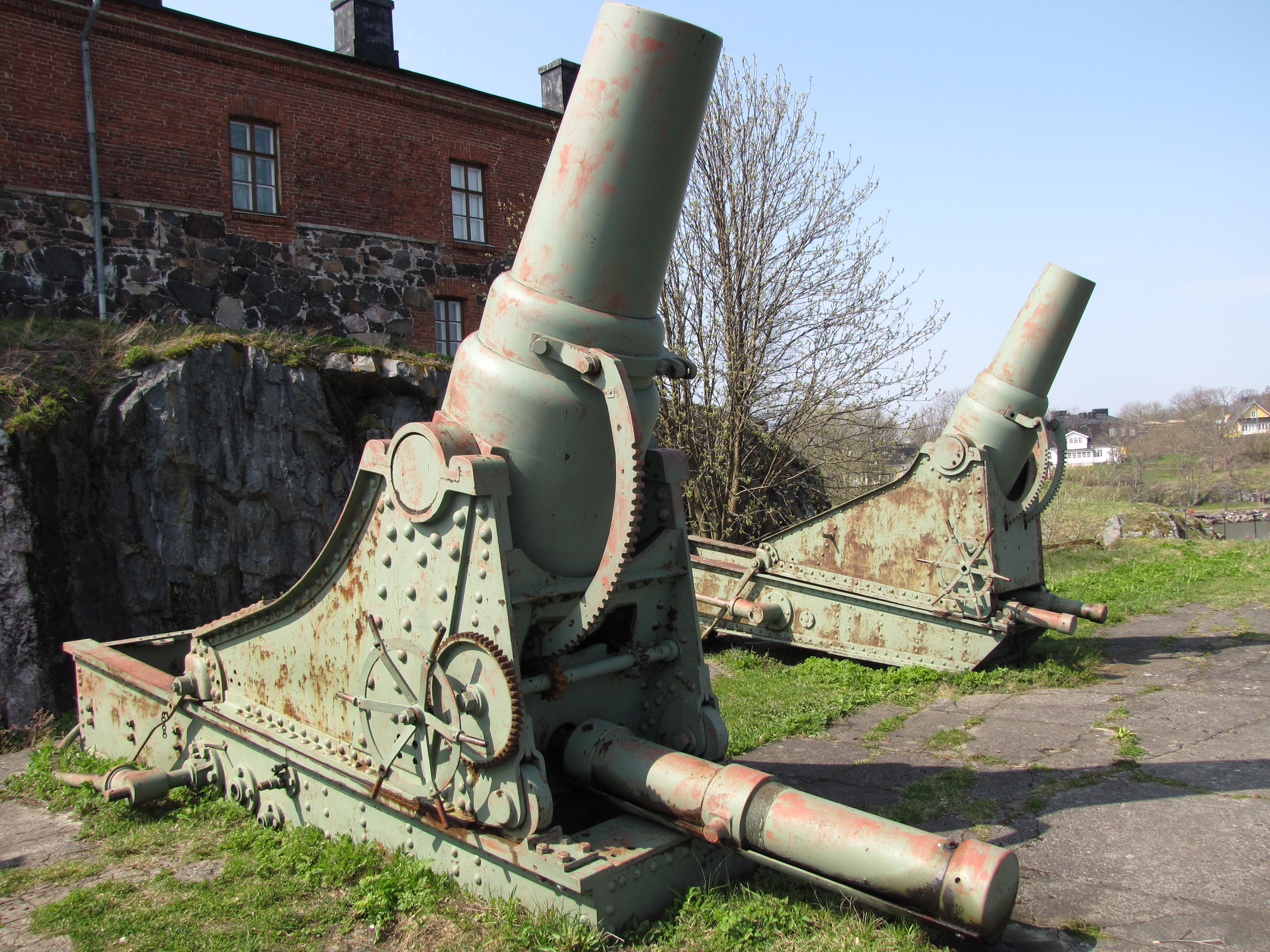
- 11-inch and 9-inch mortars at Suomenlinna.
- Type: Coastal artillery Fortress gun
- Place of origin: Russian Empire

Service history
- In service: 1891-?
- Used by: Russian Empire; Finland
- Wars: Russo-Japanese War; World War I

Production history
- Designer: Obukhov State Plant
- Designed: 1877
- Manufacturer: Obukhov State Plant; Motovilikha Plants
- Produced: 1885-86
- No. built: 93

Specifications
- Mass: 10,319 kg (22,750 lb)
- Barrel length: 3.26 m (10 ft 8 in) L/11.6 calibers
- Shell: Separate-loading, bagged charges and projectiles.
- Shell weight: 182–250 kg (401–551 lb)
- Caliber: 280 mm (11 in)
- Breech: Horizontal sliding-block
- Recoil: Hydro-gravity
- Carriage: Garrison mount
- Traverse: 360°
- Rate of fire: 1 round every three minutes
- Maximum firing range: 8.5 km (5.3 mi)

The 11-inch mortar M1877 was a Russian 280 mm (11 in) coastal and fortress mortar that was used in the Russo-Japanese War and World War I.

== History ==
The M1877 was first designed and produced by the Obukhov State Plant in Saint Petersburg and was fairly conventional for its time and most nations had similar guns with similar roles such as the French Mortier de 270 mm modèle 1889 or the US 12-inch coast defense mortar.

== Design ==
The M1877 was a short barreled breech-loading mortar. The barrel was a typical built-up gun of the period with reinforcing hoops which was built from cast iron and steel. The mortar had an early form of Krupp horizontal sliding-block breech and it fired separate-loading, bagged charges and projectiles. There were also two other similar 203 mm (8 in) and 229 mm (9 in) mortars that were also designed in 1877.

=== Coastal Defense ===
In the coastal defense role, the M1877's theory of operation was that a low-velocity mortar firing a large shell at a high-angle was more likely to destroy an enemy ship by penetrating its thin deck armor than a high-velocity low-angle naval gun attempting to penetrate its thicker belt armor. The downside was that high-angle indirect fire was harder to aim correctly so more mortars would be needed to defend an area from attack. However, if the area was constrained by geography like a port at the mouth of a river the navigation channels could be measured ahead of time and firing ranges calculated. A complicating factor was as naval artillery progressed their size and range soon eclipsed the mortar's range.

In the coastal defense role, the M1877 was mounted on a garrison mount which sat on a concrete slab behind a parapet. The mount consisted of a rectangular steel firing platform with a pivot at the front and two wheels at the rear to give 360° of traverse. The recoil system for the M1877 consisted of a U-shaped gun cradle which held the trunnioned barrel and a slightly inclined firing platform with a hydro-gravity recoil system. When the gun fired the hydraulic buffer at the front slowed the recoil of the cradle which slid up a set of inclined rails on the firing platform and then returned the gun to position by the combined action of the buffers and gravity. These garrison mounts were used in both the coastal defense and fortress gun roles.

=== Fortress Gun ===
In addition to its coastal defense role, the M1877 was also used as a fortress gun on the same type of mounts as in the coastal role. The M1877's were not designed to be mobile and it would have needed to be disassembled, moved on site and then reassembled before use. Due to a string of Russian defeats in the first two years of the war, it is possible the Germans may have captured a number of them but what use they made of them is unknown. However, the Germans did make use of captured 8-inch M1877 mortars and 11-inch M1877 guns on the Western Front.

== Photo Gallery ==
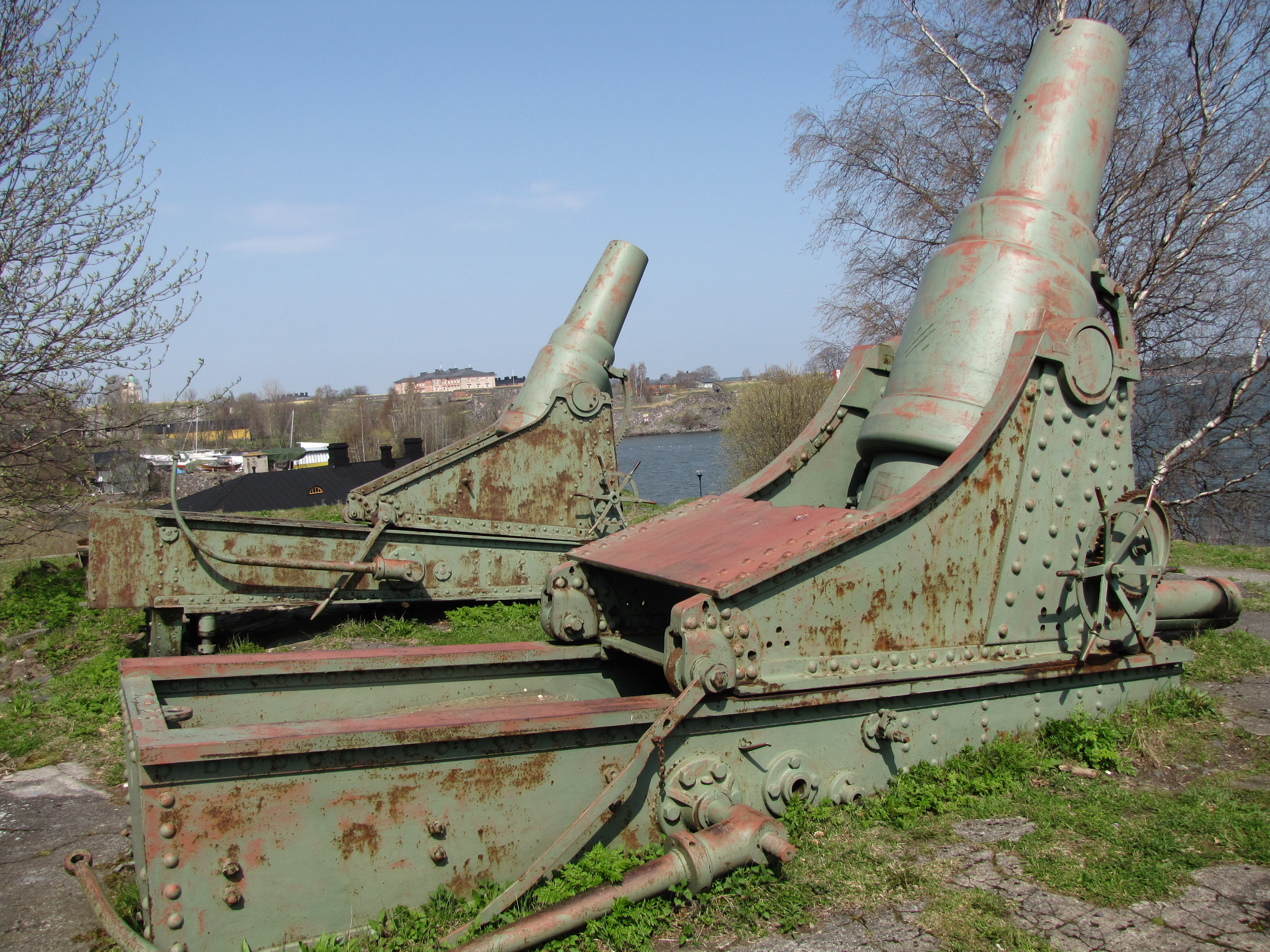
11-inch and 9-inch mortars at Suomenlinna.

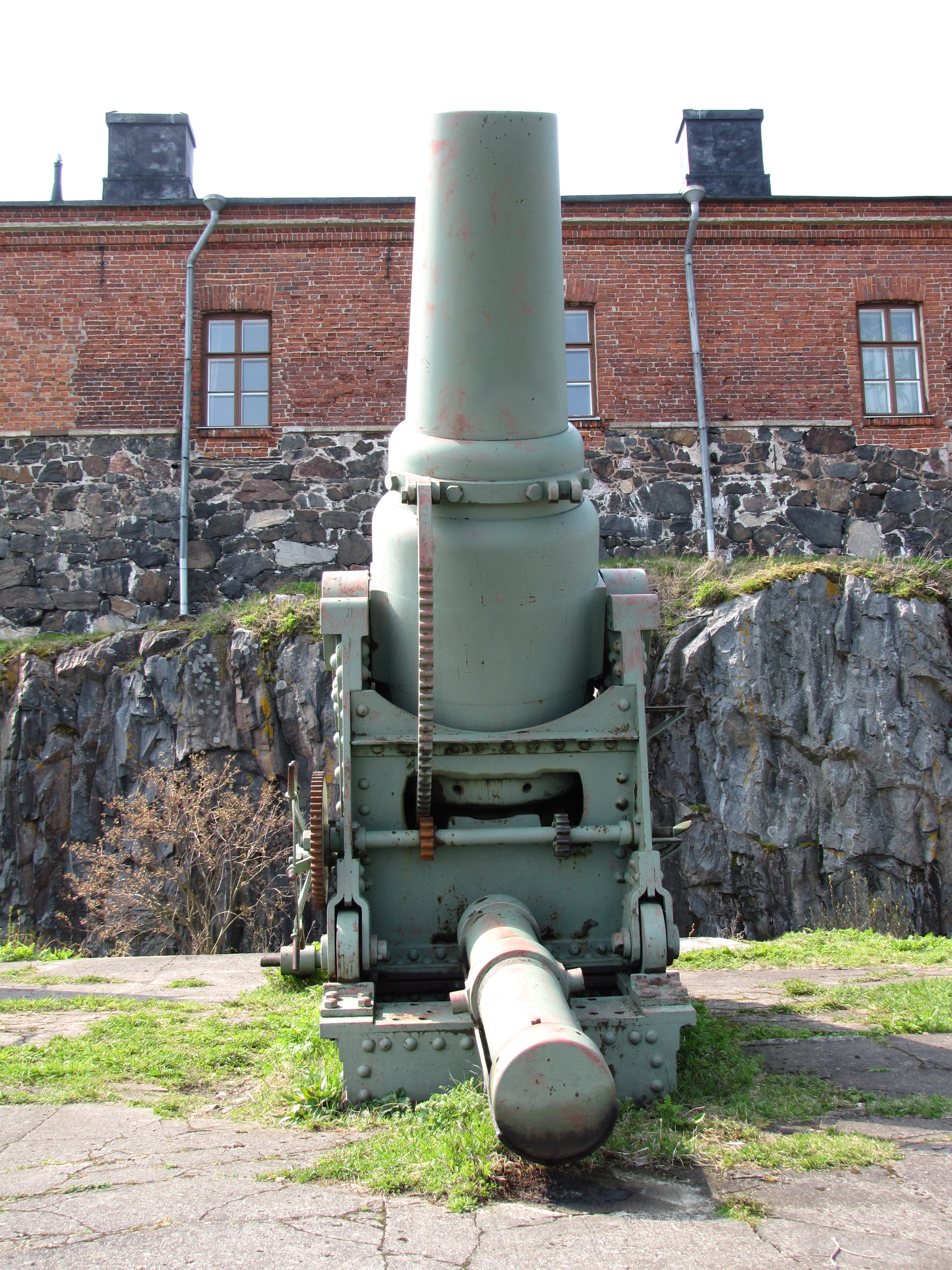
A front view of the mount and its recoil mechanism at Suomenlinna.

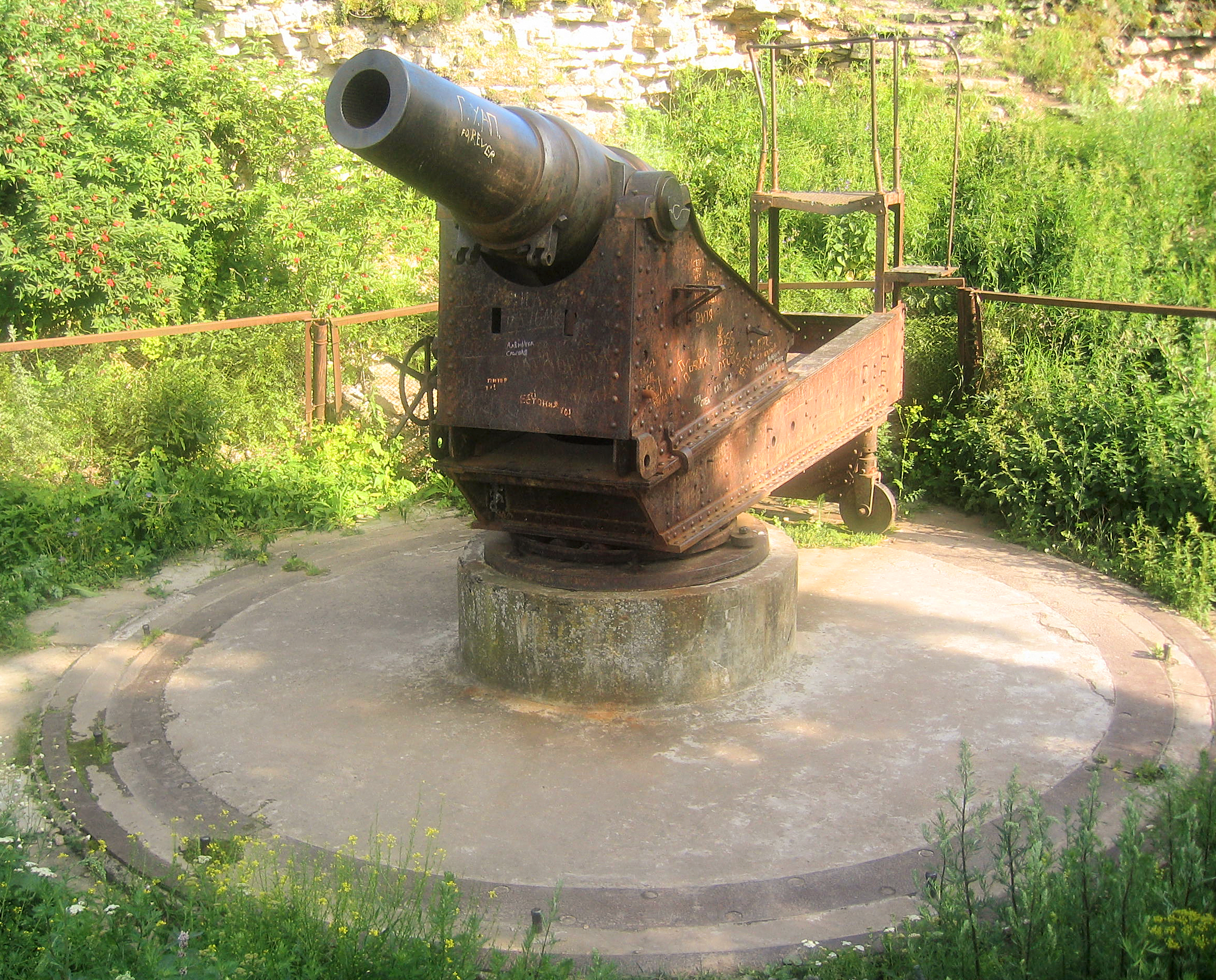
The 11-inch M1877 shared the same mount as this 9-inch M1877.

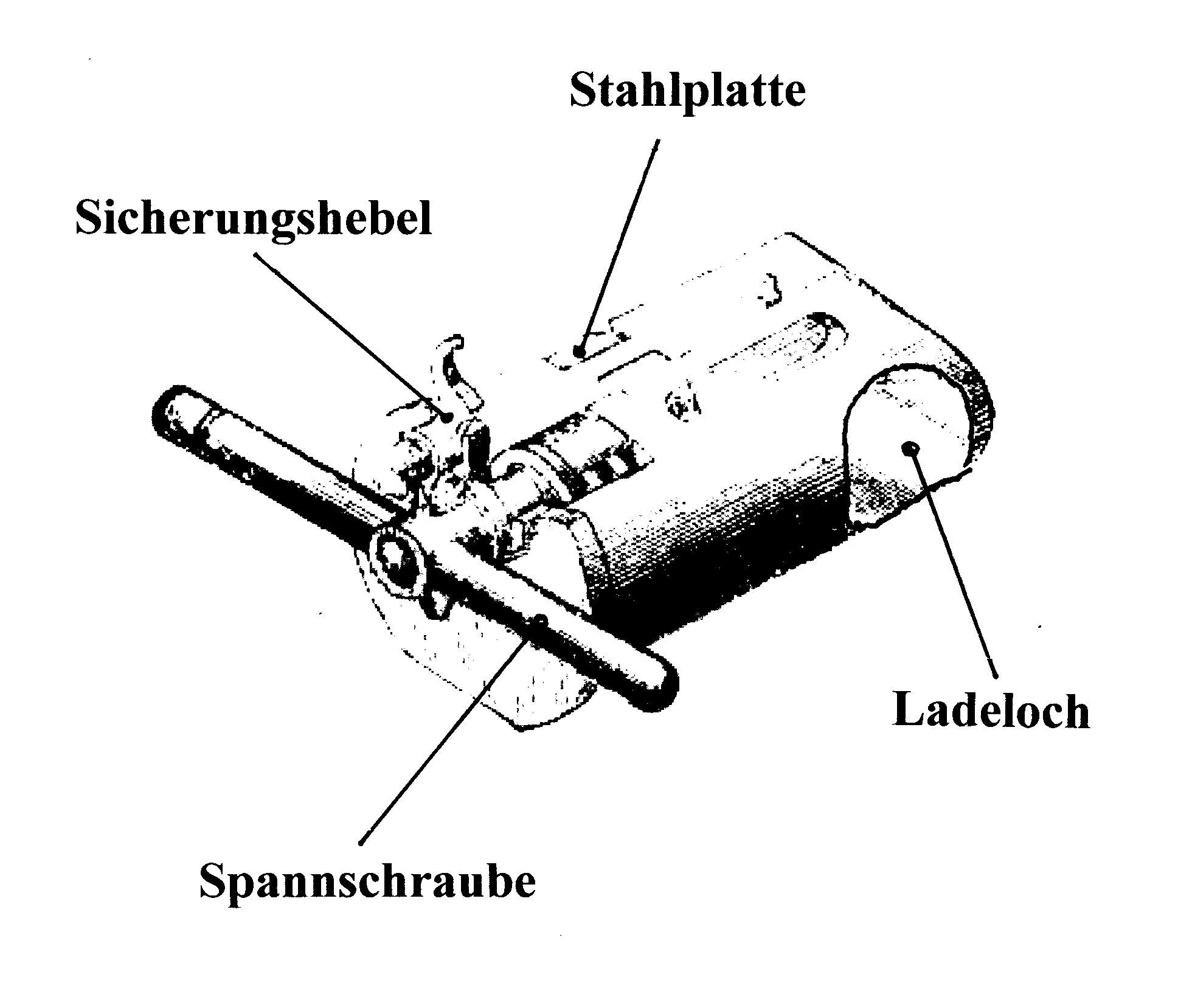
The M1877's breech block.
