= Canon de 240 modèle 93/96 TAZ =

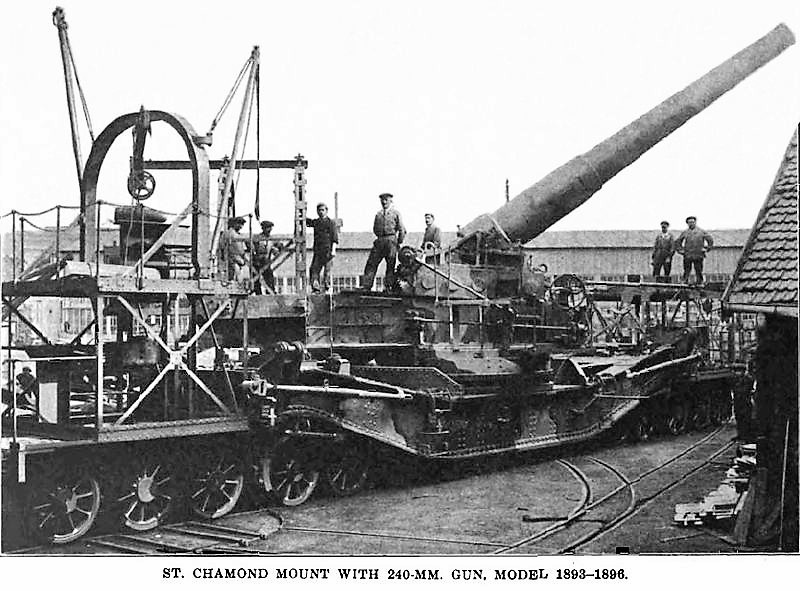
- A 240 mm modèle 1893-1896 TAZ, on a St Chamond railway mounting.
- Type: Coastal Defense gun Railway gun
- Place of origin: France

Service history
- In service: 1918–1945
- Used by: France; Nazi Germany
- Wars: World War I World War II

Production history
- Designer: St Chamond
- Manufacturer: St Chamond
- Produced: 1918
- No. built: 8

Specifications
- Mass: 140 t (140 long tons; 150 short tons)
- Length: 19.5 m (64 ft)
- Barrel length: 10 m (33 ft) L/42
- Width: 2.6 m (8 ft 6 in)
- Height: 2.7 m (8 ft 10 in)
- Shell: Separate loading bagged charges and projectiles
- Shell weight: 162 kg (357 lb)
- Caliber: 240 mm (9.4 in)
- Elevation: +15° to +35°
- Traverse: 10° L/R
- Rate of fire: 1 round every three minutes
- Muzzle velocity: 840 m/s (2,800 ft/s)
- Effective firing range: 22.7 km (14 mi)
- Maximum firing range: 24.8 km (15 mi)

The Canon de 240 modèle 93/96 TAZ was a French Coastal Defense and Railway gun used by the French Army during World War I and by the German Army during World War II.

== History ==
Although the majority of combatants had heavy field artillery prior to the outbreak of the First World War, none had adequate numbers of heavy guns in service, nor had they foreseen the growing importance of heavy artillery once the Western Front stagnated and trench warfare set in. Since aircraft of the period were not yet capable of carrying large diameter bombs the burden of delivering heavy firepower fell on the artillery. Two sources of heavy artillery suitable for conversion to field use were surplus coastal defense guns and naval guns.

Big caliber land weapons were less prevalent than large caliber naval guns because of their weight, complexity, and immobility. This created a contradiction for artillery designers of the era. Large caliber field guns often required extensive site preparation because the guns had to be broken down into multiple loads light enough to be towed by a horse team or the few traction engines of the time and then reassembled before use. Building a new gun could address the problem of disassembling, transporting and reassembling a large gun, but it didn't necessarily address how to convert existing heavy weapons to make them more mobile. Rail transport proved to be the most practical solution because the problems of heavy weight, lack of mobility and reduced setup time were addressed.

== Design ==
The Canon de 240 modèle 93/96 started life as eight Canon de 240 de côte modèle 1893 coastal defense guns that were removed from fortifications at Dakar in Senegal and Saigon in Vietnam. Because of this, the guns were often referred to as "colonies" mounts. The eight gun barrels were placed on the existing rail carriages for the Canon de 305 modèle 93/96 TAZ manufactured by the firm of St Chamond. The carriages were originally deployed in 1916 but it was too much gun for too little carriage so the 305 mm (12 in) barrels were replaced with 240 mm (9.4 in) barrels by St Chamond and entered service in 1918.

The guns used an interrupted screw breech and fired separate loading bagged charges and projectiles. The guns sat on a top carriage traversing mount which sat on a large diameter geared steel ring. A rectangular steel firing platform sat on top of the platform with the barrel of the gun overhanging the platform at the front with an overhanging loading platform for the gunners to the rear. The firing platform was then traversed by a worm gear which attached to the base. To load the gun the barrel was lowered and there was an elevated shell handling trolley at the rear. The guns had a hydro-pneumatic cradle recoil system where the cradle recoiled up a slightly inclined +4° rear deck which helped return the gun to battery after firing. The gun could be elevated between +15° and +35° when firing across the tracks but was limited to +29° when parallel because the breach of the gun would not have enough room to recoil without hitting the carriage.

The carriages consisted of rectangular steel bases, which were suspended on two railroad bogies. Each bogie had six axles. The number of axles was determined by the weight limit for European railways of 17 tonnes per axle. Since the barrels were coastal defense guns that were not intended for use at high angles of elevation the trunnions were relocated relatively far forward and the guns were nose heavy. The carriage used ground platform anchoring and site preparation included laying wooden beams parallel to the tracks then splicing in a section of rail bed reinforced with wooden beams under the center which the carriage was lowered onto. Outriggers and ground anchors were also used to stabilize the gun once in firing position as well as five screw jacks. Although the mount was capable to 360° of traverse it was often limited to 10° left/right of the centerline because of problems with balance and recoil which hampered the earlier Canon de 305 modèle 93/96 TAZ. For this reason, the weapon was not considered a success.

== Coastal defense ==
The eight Canon de 240 modèle 93/96 TAZ guns remained in reserve between the two world wars and were mobilized during 1939 at the outbreak of World War II. Four guns were assigned to the 10th and 11th Heavy Artillery Batteries of the 374° Regiment of the ALVF (Artillerie Lourde sur Voie Ferrée) in the South of France facing the Italians. After the French surrender, the guns were assigned the German designations 24 cm Kanone (E) 558 (f) or 24 cm Kanone (E) Model 93/96 (f). In German service, they reverted to their coastal defense role and in 1942 they were integrated into Germany's Atlantic Wall defenses. Four guns were located at St. Nazaire in France while another four were located in Norway first at Narvik from 1942 to 1944 and later at Naerbo from 1944 to 1945.

== Ammunition ==
- APC (Armor Piercing Capped) - 170 kg (370 lb)
- CI (Common Incendiary) - 144 kg (317 lb)
- SAPC (Semi-Armor Piercing Capped) - 170 kg (370 lb)

== Gallery ==
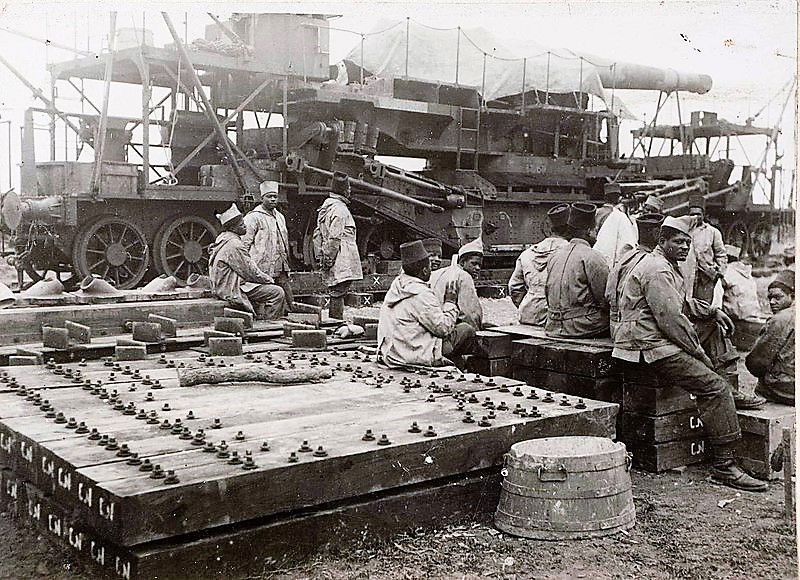
French colonial troops with site preparation materials.

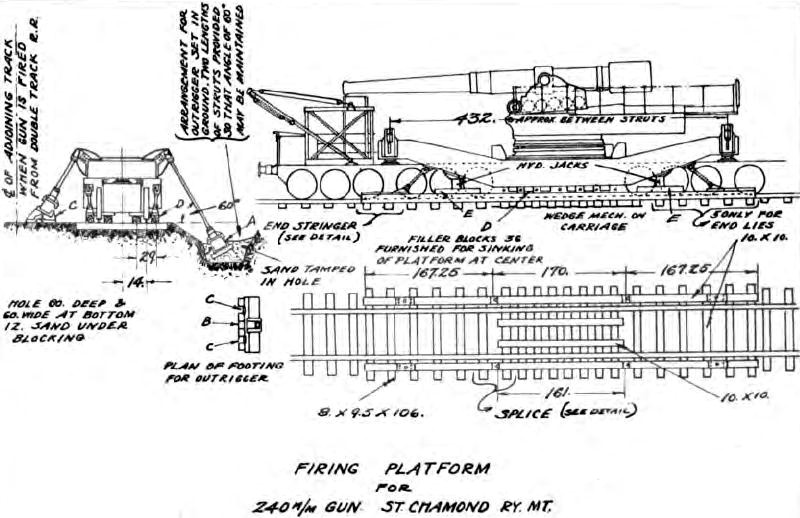
A line drawing showing the site preparation needed for the gun.

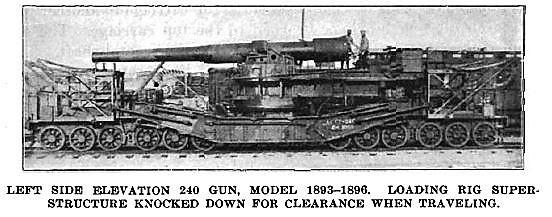
A profile view of the gun.
