= Trunnion =

Protrusion for mount or pivot point

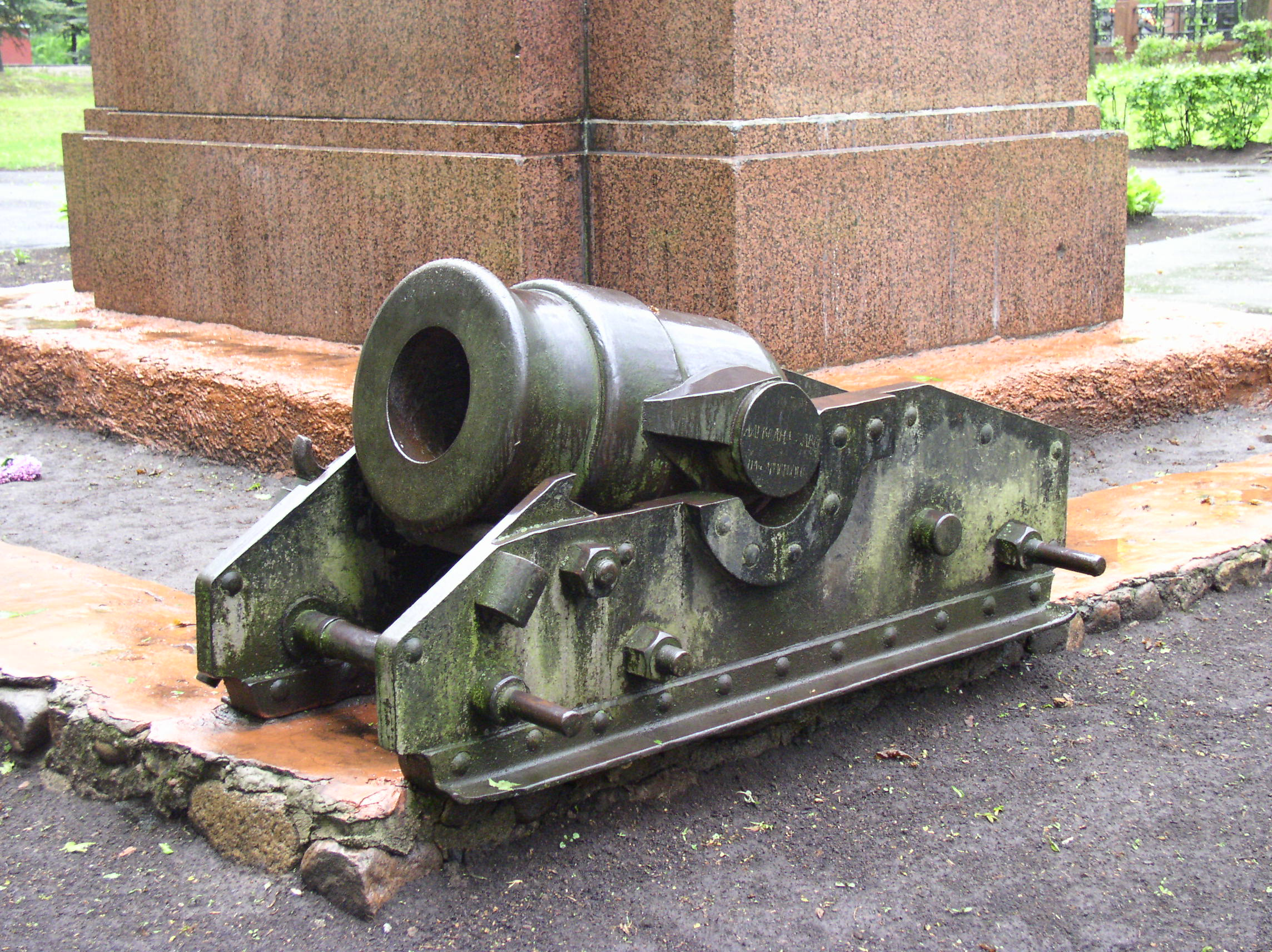
The trunnions are the protrusions from the side of the barrel that rest on the carriage.

A trunnion (from Old French trognon 'trunk') is a cylindrical protrusion used as a mounting or pivoting point. First associated with cannons, they are an important military development.

In mechanical engineering (see the trunnion bearing section below), it is one part of a rotating joint where a shaft (the trunnion) is inserted into (and turns inside) a full or partial cylinder.

== Medieval history ==
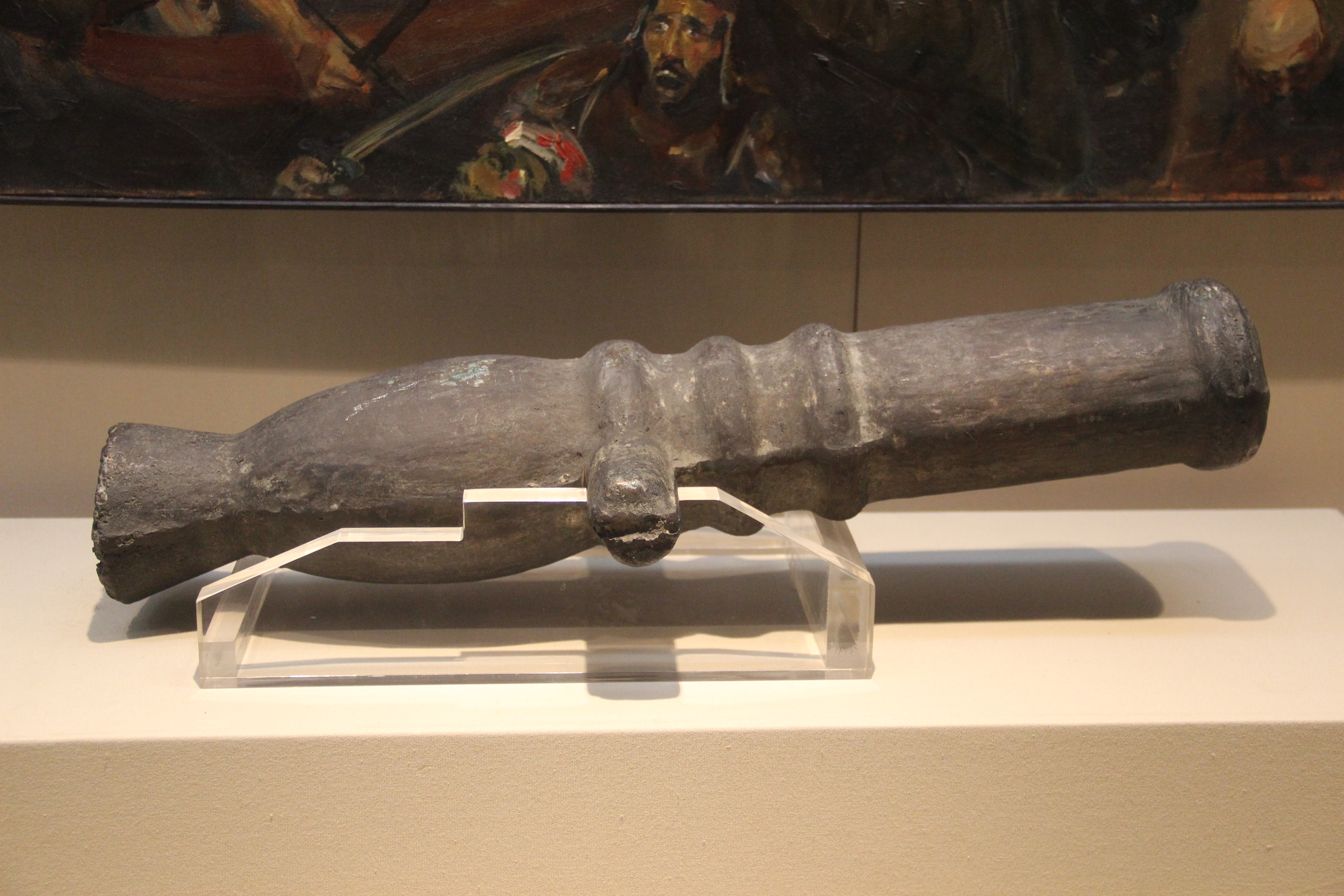
Early Chinese cannon with trunnions, Yuan Dynasty (1271–1368). Kept in Zhejiang Provincial Museum.

In a cannon, the trunnions are two projections cast just forward of the center of mass of the cannon and fixed to a two-wheeled movable gun carriage.

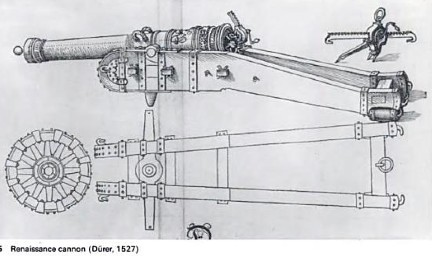
16th-century depiction of a cannon with trunnions

With the creation of larger and more powerful siege guns in the early 15th century, a new way of mounting them became necessary. Stouter gun carriages were created with reinforced wheels, axles, and “trails” which extended behind the gun. Guns were now as long as 2.5 metres (8 ft) in length and they were capable of shooting iron projectiles weighing from 10 to 25 kilograms (25 to 50 lb). When discharged, these wrought iron balls were comparable in range and accuracy with stone-firing bombards.

Trunnions were mounted near the center of mass to allow the barrel to be elevated to any desired angle, without having to dismount it from the carriage upon which it rested. Some guns had a second set of trunnions placed several feet back from the first pair, which could be used to allow for easier transportation. The gun would recoil causing the carriage to move backwards several feet but men or a team of horses could put it back into firing position. It became easier to rapidly transport these large siege guns, maneuver them from transportation mode to firing position, and they could go wherever a team of men or horses could pull them.

== Initial significance ==
Due to its capabilities, the French- and Burgundy-designed siege gun, equipped with its trunnions, required little significant modification from around 1465 to the 1840s.

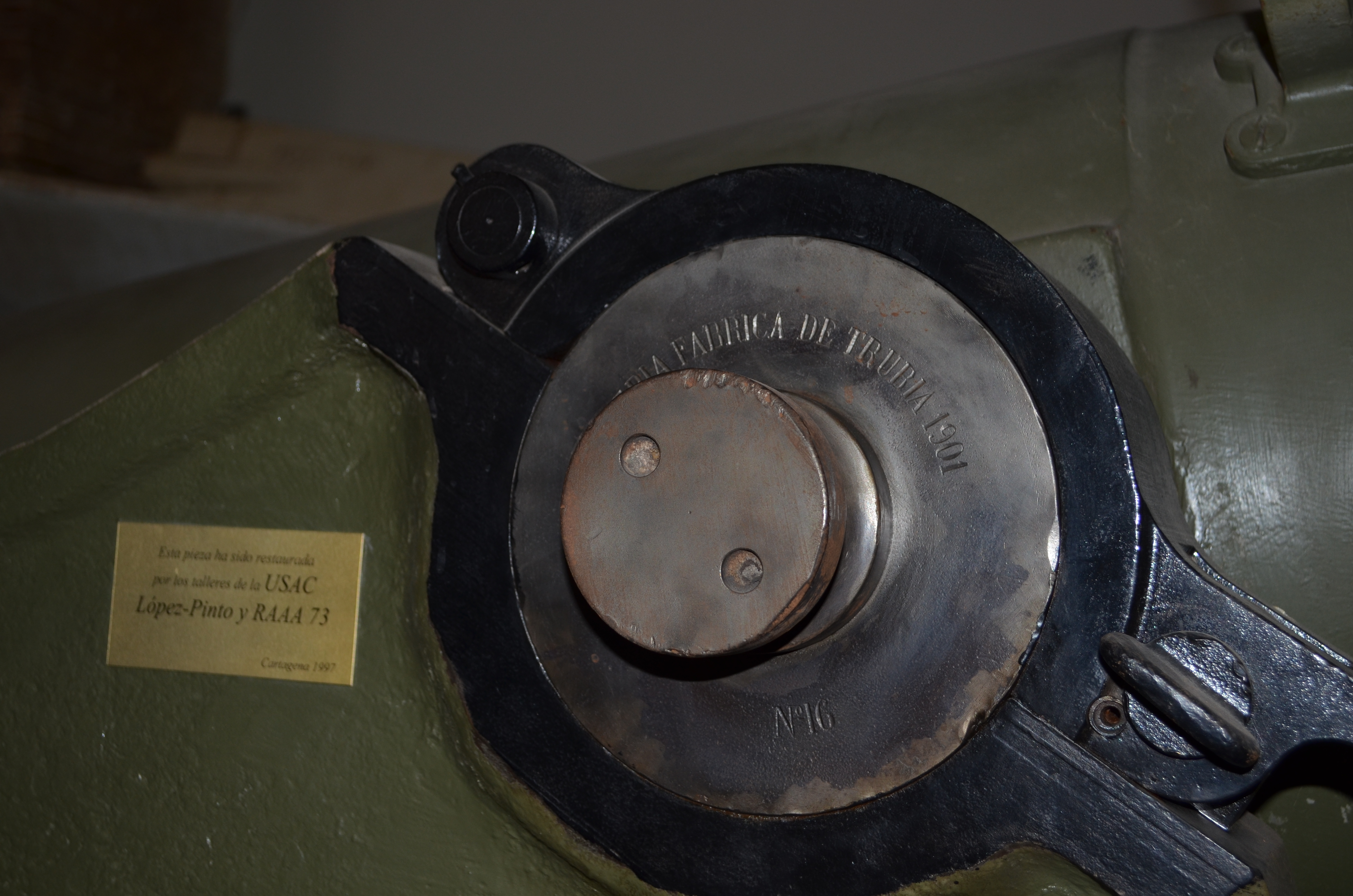
Gun trunnions often bear factory markings

King Charles VIII and the French army used this new gun in the 1494 invasion of Italy. Although deemed masters of war and artillery at that time, Italians had not anticipated the innovations in French siege weaponry. Prior to this, field artillery guns were huge, large-caliber bombards: superguns that, along with enormous stones or other projectiles, were dragged from destination to destination. These behemoths could only be used effectively in sieges, and more often than not provided just a psychological effect on the battlefield; owning these giant mortars did not guarantee any army a victory. The French saw the limitations of these massive weapons and focused their efforts on improving their smaller and lighter guns, which used smaller, more manageable projectiles combined with larger amounts of gunpowder. Equipping them with trunnions was key for two reasons. First, teams of horses could now move these cannons fast enough to keep up with their armies and no longer had to stop and dismount them from their carriages to achieve the proper range before firing; second, the capability to adjust firing angle without having to lift the entire weight of the gun allowed tactical selection and reselection of targets rather than being deployed solely on the first target chosen. Francesco Guicciardini, an Italian historian and statesman, wrote that the cannons were placed against town walls so quickly, spaced together so closely and shot so rapidly and with such force that the time for a significant amount of damage to be inflicted went from a matter of days (as with bombards) to a matter of hours. For the first time in history, as seen in the 1512 battle of Ravenna and the 1515 Battle of Marignano, artillery weaponry played a very decisive part in the victory of the invading army over the city under siege. Cities that had proudly withstood sieges for up to seven years fell swiftly with the advent of these new weapons.

Defensive tactics and fortifications had to be altered since these new weapons could be transported so speedily and aimed with much more accuracy at strategic locations. Two significant changes were the additions of a ditch and low, sloping ramparts of packed earth (glacis) that would surround the city and absorb the impact of the cannonballs, and the replacement of round watchtowers with angular bastions. These towers would be deemed trace Italienne.

Whoever could afford these new weapons had the tactical advantage over their neighbors and smaller sovereignties, which could not incorporate them into their army. Smaller states, such as the principalities of Italy, began to conglomerate. Preexisting stronger entities, such as France or the Habsburg emperors, were able to expand their territories and maintain a tighter control over the land they already occupied.

== Uses ==
=== In vehicles ===
- In older cars, the trunnion is part of the suspension and either allows free movement of the rear wheel hub in relation to the chassis or allows the front wheel hub to rotate with the steering. On many cars (such as those made by Triumph) the trunnion is machined from a brass or bronze casting and is prone to failure if not greased properly. Between 1962 and 1965 American Motors recommended lubrication of its pre-packed front suspension trunnions on some models using a sodium base grease every 32,000 miles (51,000 km) or three years. In 1963 it incorporated molded rubber "Clevebloc" bushings on the upper trunnion of others to seal out dirt and retain silicone lubricant for the life of the car.
- In aviation, the term refers to the structural component that attaches the undercarriage or landing gear to the airframe. For aircraft equipped with retractable landing gear, the trunnion is pivoted to permit rotation of the entire gear assembly.
- In axles, the term refers to the type of suspension used on a multi-axle configurations. It is a "short axle pivoted at or near its mid-point about a horizontal axis transverse to its own centerline, normally used in pairs in conjunction with a walking beam in order to achieve two [axes] of oscillation." This type of suspension allows 60,000 pounds (27,000 kg) to be loaded on an axle group.
- In trailers, leveling jacks may have trunnion mounts.

== Trunnion bearings ==
In mechanical engineering, it is one part of a rotating joint where a shaft (the trunnion) is inserted into (and turns inside) a full or partial cylinder. Often used in opposing pairs, this joint allows tight tolerances and strength from a large surface contact area between the trunnion and the cylinder.

== See also ==
- Gimbal
