= PLZ-05 =

Chinese 155 mm self-propelled howitzer

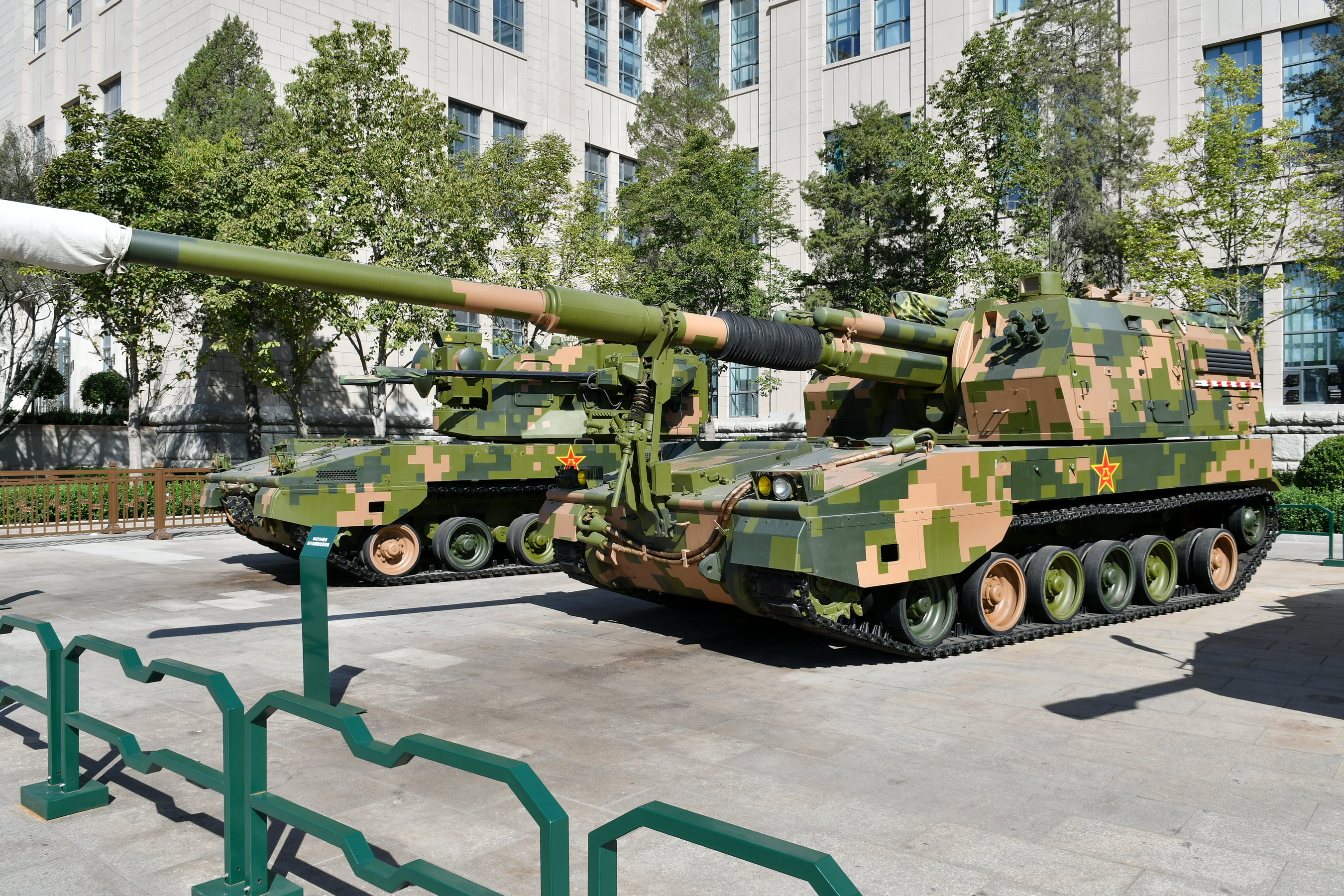
- The PLZ-05 at an exhibition at the Military Museum of the Chinese People's Revolution in 2017.
- Type: Self-propelled artillery
- Place of origin: China

Production history
- Designer: Norinco
- Designed: 1990s
- Manufacturer: Norinco
- Produced: 2003–2025

Specifications
- Mass: 35 tonnes to 45 tonnes
- Length: 11.60 m
- Width: 3.38 m
- Height: 3.55 m
- Crew: 4
- Caliber: 155 mm
- Barrels: 52 caliber (PLZ-05 & PLZ-05A); 54 caliber (PLZ-04)
- Traverse: 360°
- Rate of fire: 8-10 rounds/min (PLZ-05); 8-10 rounds/min (PLZ-05A); 4 rounds in 15 seconds burst firing rate (PLZ-05)
- Maximum firing range: Varies by munition. 20km (laser-homing); 39km (ERFB-BB); 50km (ERFB-BB-RA); 60km (WS-35B)
- Main armament: 155 mm howitzer
- Secondary armament: QJC-88 12.7 mm anti-aircraft machine gun 2 sets of 4-barrel grenade launchers
- Engine: 8V150-cooled turbocharged diesel 800 hp (PLZ-05); 1000 hp (PLZ-05A)
- Power/weight: 23 hp/t (17.15 kW/t)
- Suspension: torsion bar and hydropneumatic suspension
- Operational range: 550 km (PLZ-05); 450 km (PLZ-05A)
- Maximum speed: 56 km/h (PLZ-05); 65 km/h (PLZ-05A)

The PLZ-05 or the Type 05 is a 155 mm self-propelled howitzer developed by the People's Liberation Army of China to replace the Type 59-1 130 mm towed gun and Type 83 152 mm self-propelled gun. The PLZ-05 was officially unveiled at the Military Museum of the Chinese People's Revolution to mark the 80th anniversary of the PLA in July 2007, and first entered service with the PLA in 2008.

== History ==
In the 1980s, Chinese military manufacturer Norinco acquired the license to produce GHN-45 howitzer from Noricum, a subsidiary of the Austrian company Voest-Alpine, who developed GHN-45 based on the design of the GC-45 howitzer. GHN-45 (Gun, Howitzer, Noricum) featured several improvements over the original GC-45, such as better ammunition and fire control systems. Due to the design improvements, GHN-45 had considerably longer ranges than other 155 mm cannon systems used by NATO and Western countries. This capability initially caused worry for allied forces in the Persian Gulf War. The designer Gerald Bull was contacted in late 1980s by China to develop his work, which he agreed. China also purchased extended-range ammunition technology from him.

The Chinese production designation of the GHN-45 is WAC-021 and PLL-01, which entered service in 1987. China continue to acquire and develop other technologies for the PLL-01, such as precision guided projectiles GP1. China also mounted the PLL-01 onto an indigenous-designed tracked chassis, resulting in the PLZ-45 (also known as the Type 88) and support vehicles based on the same chassis. Two major batches of PLZ-45s were sold to the Kuwaiti in 1997 and to Saudi Arabia in 2008. However, the PLZ-45 did not enter service with the People's Liberation Army Ground Force because China was still using the doctrine developed for the Soviet-standard 152 mm ammunition at the time.

In 2003, China began to develop prototypes of the PLZ-05, an evolution of the PLZ-45, for domestic use. The PLZ-05 was adopted by Chinese army in 2008 in order to replace the older Type 83 152 mm self-propelled howitzer. The adoption of PLZ-05 signified China's paradigm shift in artillery doctrines, moving from the Soviet model to Western model. The original PLZ-45 was fitted with 155 mm/L45 howitzer, but PLZ-05 has a longer barrel and improved range, accuracy and fire rate.

== Design ==
PLZ-05 features an indigenous-developed chassis derived from the PLZ-45. Although PLZ-45 had an indigenous semi-automatic loader, PLZ-05 is reportedly fitted with a fully-automatic loading system similar to 2S19 Msta, providing a rate of fire of 8 - 10 rounds/minute. The autoloader can support a higher fire rate and burst fire rate of 4 rounds per 15 seconds at the expense of its service life. The weapons can also use continuous fire support for 3-5 rounds per minute. The main armament has a maximum range of 40 kilometers when using ERFB-BB and more than 50 kilometers when using ERFB-BB-RA. The system can achieve 70 kilometers range with rocket-assist ammunition. The howitzer can be deployed full-automatically, so the crew can always stay inside the vehicle.

The PLZ-05 is fitted with a digital fire control system, ballistic computers, a gunner day/night thermal imaging system, a laser range finder, and a commander-independent thermal viewer. In addition to indirect fire support, the main gun can be used as an anti-tank cannon or anti-fortification assault gun in an emergency.

The PLZ-05's armor can protect its crew against small arms fire and artillery shell splinters. The frontal plates can defend against 14.5 mm machine gun rounds. The chassis features NBC protection and automatic fire suppression systems. The PLZ-05 howitzer is supported by other variants of the same family, including company commander vehicle, battalion commander vehicle, artillery reconnaissance vehicle, ammunition carrier, radar vehicle, meteorological data collection vehicle and armored recovery vehicle, etc.

The PLZ-05 is powered by an 8V150 diesel engine with 800 hp. The engine allows for a road speed of up to 55 km/h. It features six roadwheels with a combined torsion bar and hydropneumatic suspension system. The hydropneumatic suspension units are fitted on the first and sixth roadwheel, giving the vehicle improved shock absorption and terrain adaptability. The vehicle is fitted with CH700 transmission, providing better mobility compared to previous generations of the Chinese vehicles. An auxiliary power unit can provide onboard weapon systems with electricity when the engine is not running.

== Variants ==
=== PLZ-05 (Type 05) ===
Self-propelled howitzer with a 52 caliber barrel, 800 hp diesel engine & gross weight of 35 tonnes. It is deployed only with the People's Liberation Army. The PLZ-05 can fire the WS-35 shell, a 40 lb (18 kg) guided munition with accuracy of 40 m (130 ft) and a max range reported to be 100 km (62 mi). It is guided using Beidou Navigation Satellite System, the Chinese version of global positioning system, and inertial guidance.

=== PLZ-05A (PLZ-52) ===
The PLZ-52 is a 155mm / 52 caliber tracked self-propelled howitzer similar in appearance to the PLZ-45, but based on a slightly different hull. Having a gross vehicle weight of 43 tonnes, the PLZ-52 features a new powerpack, which consists of a diesel engine developing 1,000 hp at 2,300 rpm coupled to a fully automatic transmission. This gives a maximum road speed of up to 65 km/h and an operational range up to 450 km. The PLZ-52 howitzer has a maximum firing range of 50 km (with ERFB-BB-RA projectiles), maximum firing rate of eight rounds per minute, a burst firing rate of three rounds per fifteen seconds, and a multiple-round simultaneous impact capability of four rounds.

The driver and powerpack are at the front of the hull with a fully enclosed turret at the rear. It has torsion bar and hydropneumatic suspension with six dual rubber tired road wheels, a drive sprocket at the front, idler at the rear and track return rollers. The PLZ-52 is offered for export.

=== PLZ-04 ===
Self-propelled howitzer with a 54 caliber barrel and apparently offered for export. This version was reportedly exported to Kuwait and Saudi Arabia.

=== PLZ-05B ===
Self-propelled howitzer with lengthened hull using seven pairs of seven roadwheels. An ammunition resupply vehicle variant also exists.

== Operators ==
China

- People's Liberation Army Ground Force - 320 PLZ-05

== Gallery ==
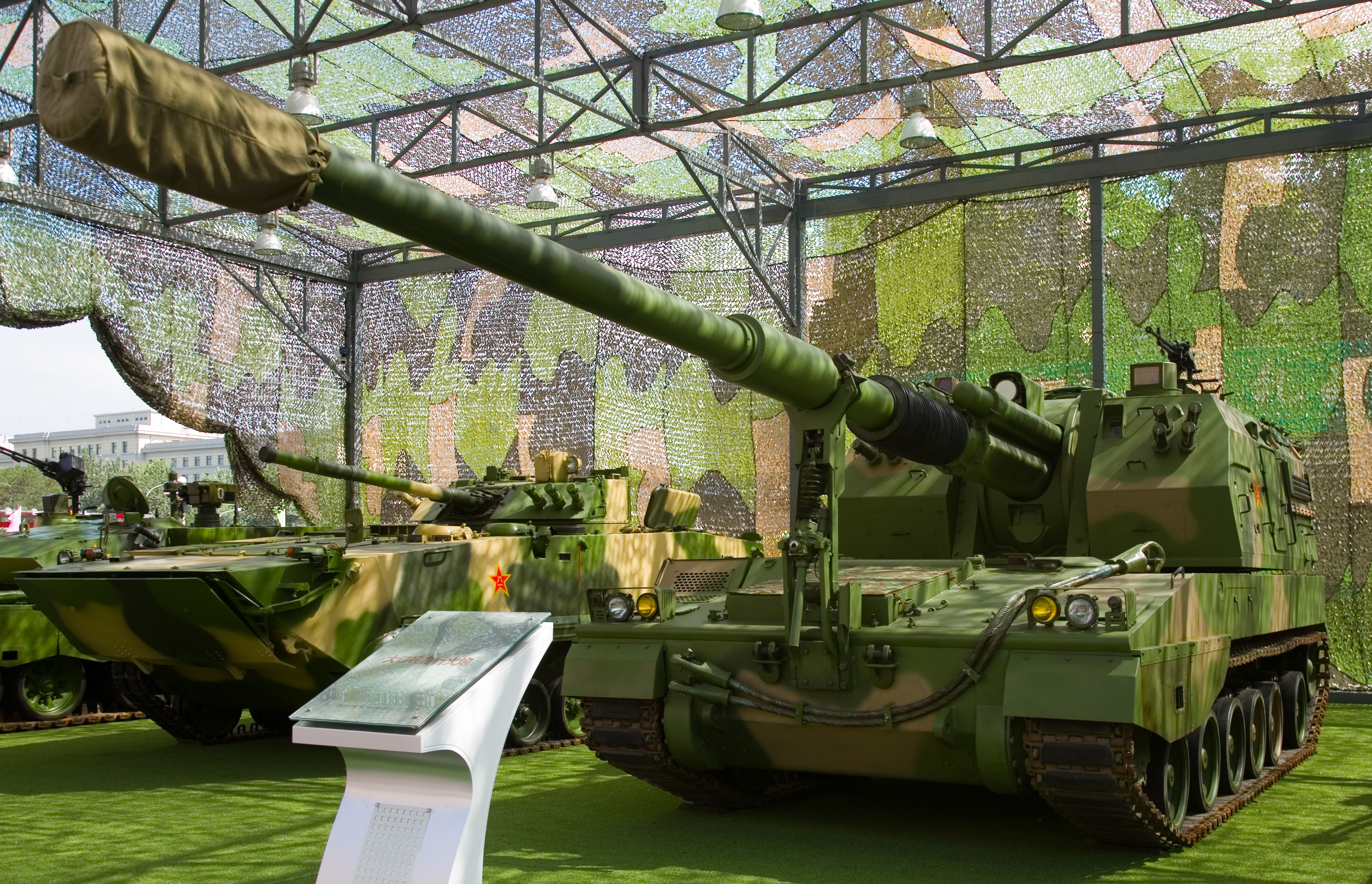
PLZ-05 at the China People's Revolution Military Museum in Beijing during the 2007 Our troops towards the sun exhibition.

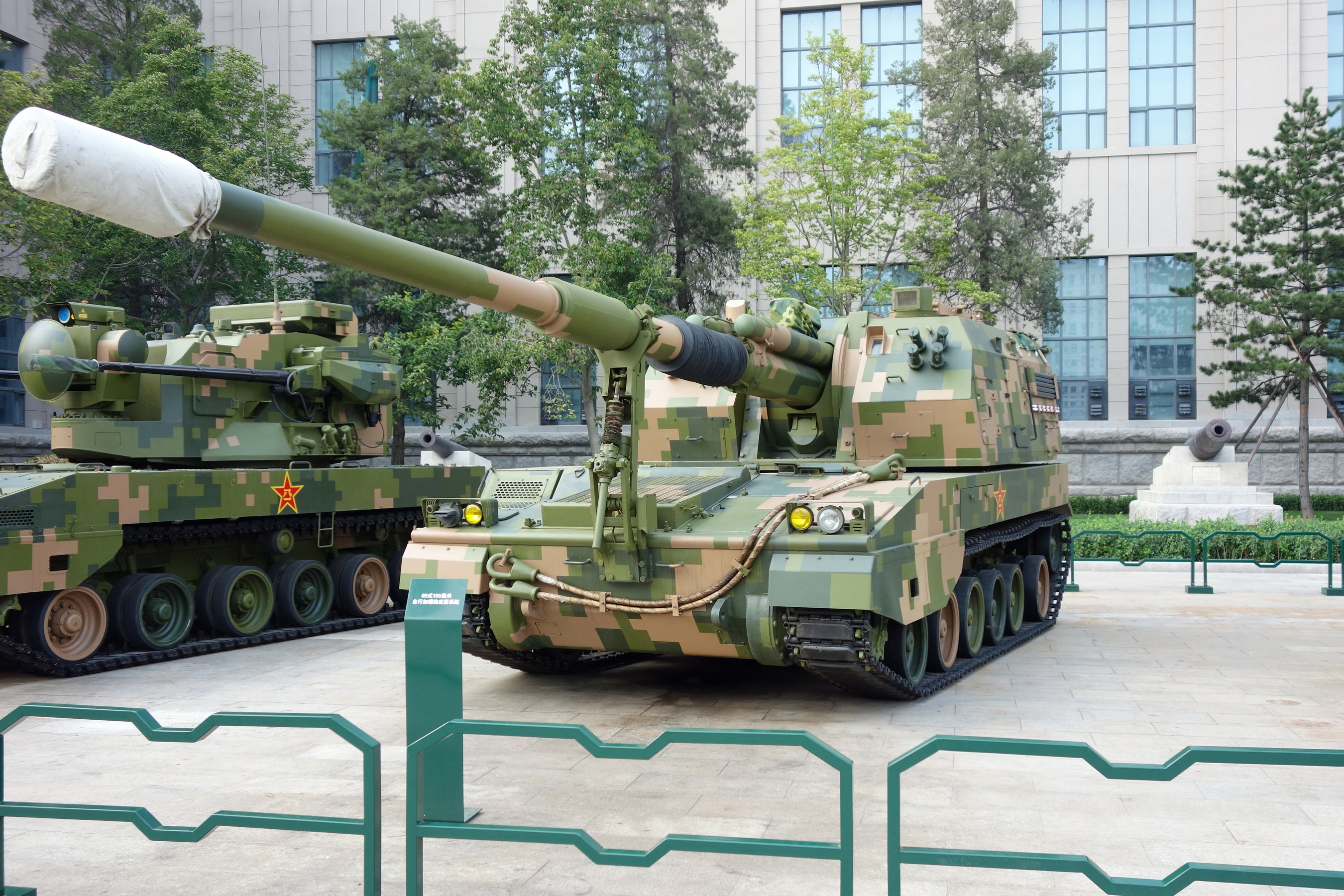
The front of PLZ-05

== See also ==
- AHS Krab – (Poland)
- K9 Thunder – (South Korea)
- M109 – (United States)
- Panzerhaubitze 2000 – (Germany)
- Raad-2 – (Iran)
- SSPH Primus – (Singapore)
- T-155 Fırtına – (Turkey)
- Type 99 – (Japan)
- 2S35 Koalitsiya-SV – (Russia)

== Sources ==
- The International Institute for Strategic Studies (2022). The Military Balance 2022. Routledge. ISBN 978-1-032-27900-8.
