= PLZ-45 =

Chinese 155 mm self-propelled howitzer

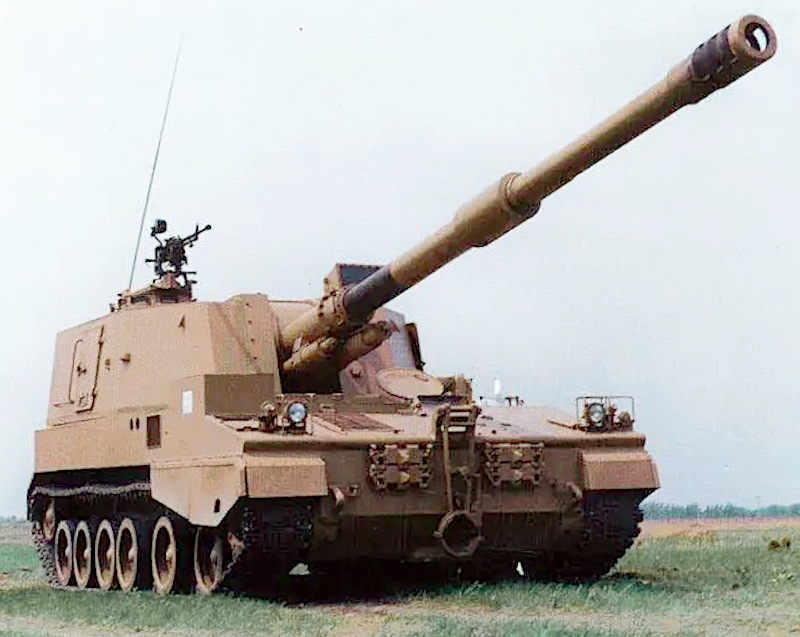
- Chinese PLZ-45
- Type: Self-propelled artillery
- Place of origin: China

Service history
- Used by: See § Operators
- Wars: Yemeni Civil War (2014–present)

Production history
- Designer: Norinco
- Designed: 1980s – early 1990s
- Manufacturer: Norinco
- Unit cost: $ 7.1 millions
- Produced: 1997

Specifications
- Mass: 33 tonnes
- Length: 10.5 m (34 ft 5 in)
- Width: 3.3 m (10 ft 10 in)
- Height: 2.6 m (8 ft 6 in) with AAMG
- Crew: 5
- Caliber: 155 mm
- Traverse: 360°
- Rate of fire: Maximum: 5 rounds/min Sustained: 2 rounds/min
- Effective firing range: (HE) 24 km; (ERFB) 30 km; (ERFB-HB-BB) 39 km
- Armor: Protection against small arms fire and artillery shell splinters
- Main armament: PLL-01 howitzer
- Secondary armament: 12.7 mm heavy machine gun 2 sets of 4-barrel grenade launchers
- Engine: Deutz turbocharged air-cooled diesel engine 525 hp (391 kW)
- Power/weight: 15 hp/tonne
- Suspension: Torsion bar
- Operational range: 550 km (340 mi)
- Maximum speed: 55 km/h (34 mph) (on-road)

The PLZ-45 or Type 88 is a 155 mm self-propelled howitzer developed by Norinco. It is based on Norinco's Type 89 (PLL-01) 155 mm/45-calibre towed gun-howitzer.

The PLZ-45 self-propelled howitzer is used by the Chinese People's Liberation Army, the Algerian People's National Army, the Kuwait Army and the Saudi Arabian Army.

== History ==
Noricum, the arms division of the Austrian steel company Voestalpine, purchased the design rights to the GC-45 howitzer after Space Research Corporation moved to Brussels. They made a number of detail changes to improve mass production, resulting in the GHN-45 (Gun, Howitzer, Noricum), which was offered in a variety of options like the APU and fire-control systems. Once out of prison, Gerald Bull was soon contacted by China.

The PLA also used the Noricum version, producing it as the PLL-01, which entered service in 1987. They also mounted it on a locally designed tracked chassis to produce the PLZ-45 (also known as the Type 88), along with an ammo-carrier based on the same chassis. The PLZ-45 did not enter service with the PLA primarily because their existing artillery was all based on Soviet-standard 152 mm ammunition. However, two major batches of PLZ-45s were sold to Kuwait and Saudi Arabia.

== Design ==
=== Armament ===
Operated by a crew of five (commander, gunner, two loaders and a driver), the PLZ-45 is armed with a 155 mm, 45-calibre main gun, with a semi-automatic loader and an electrically controlled and hydraulically operated ram that enables projectile loading to take place at any angle of elevation with the charge being loaded manually. The turret has an elevation of +72 to –3 degrees with 360 degree traverse.

Secondary weapons include a roof-mounted W-85 heavy machine gun and two sets of four-barrel smoke grenade launchers on the turret's side.

Ammunition is stored at the rear of the turret. A total of 30 rounds for the gun-howitzer and 480 rounds for the machine gun are carried on board. 24 howitzer rounds are carried in the loader and 6 rounds on the right side below the loader.

The fire-control system of the PLZ-45 includes an automatic laying system, optical sighting system, gun orientation and navigation system, and a GPS receiver.

=== Munitions ===
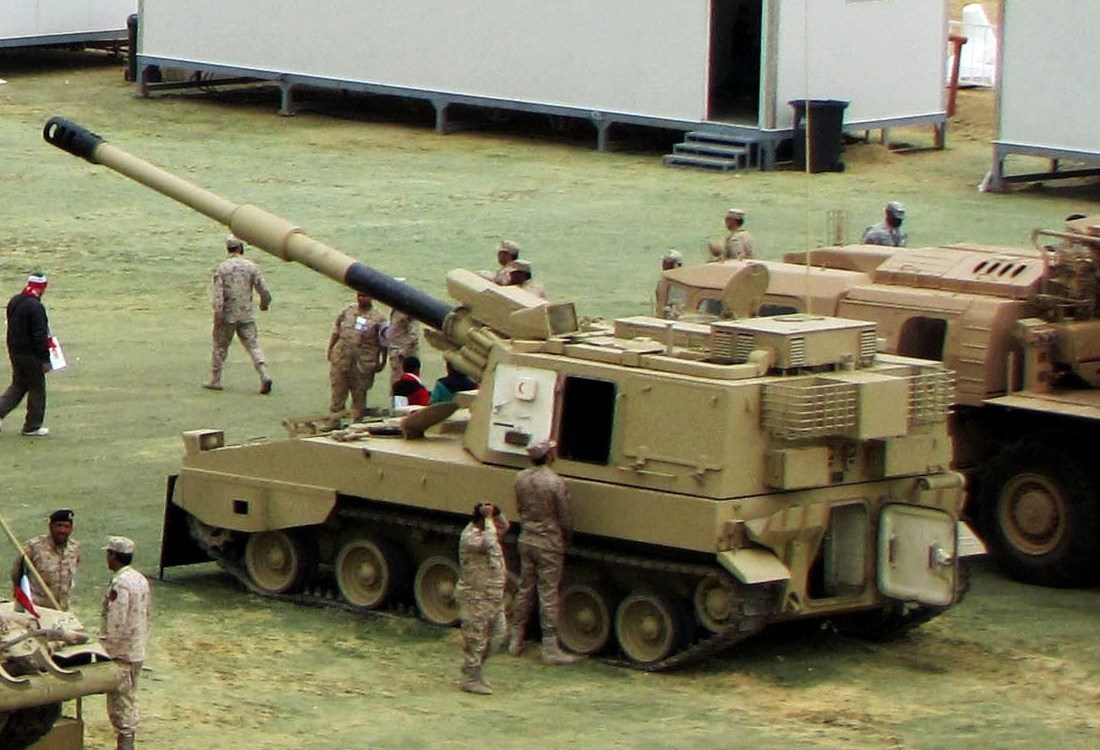
Kuwaiti PLZ-45 self-propelled howitzer in February 2011

The PLZ-45 howitzer fires a range of Extended Range Full Bore (ERFB) ammunition, including High Explosive (ERFB/HE), Base Bleed High Explosive (ERFB-BB/HE), ERFB-BB/RA, ERFB/WP, ERFB/Illuminating, ERFB/Smoke, and ERFB-BB/Cargo.

China obtained the Russian Krasnopol laser-guided projectile technology in the 1990s, and successfully developed its own 155 mm laser-guided ammunition. Designed to defeat armoured vehicles and weapon emplacements, the projectile has inertial mid-course guidance and semi-active laser homing. The projectile has a range of 3–20 km (1.9–12.4 mi), and can hit a target by the first shot without registration.

=== Combat ===
A standard PLZ-45 battalion consists of 3 batteries, each with 6 PLZ-45 self-propelled howitzers (SPH) and 6 PCZ-45 ammunition support vehicles (ASV). Each battery has a battery command post and 3 battery reconnaissance vehicles (BRV), both of which are based on the Type 85 APC. These are supported by W653A armoured recovery vehicles, 704-1 artillery locating and fire correction radar, 702-D meteorological radar, and fire support maintenance vehicles.

=== Propulsion ===
The PLZ-45 self-propelled howitzer is powered by a 525 hp Deutz turbocharged air-cooled diesel engine, giving a max road speed of 55 km/h (34 mph).

=== Armour and protection ===
The armour of the PLZ-45 self-propelled howitzer protects against small arms fire and artillery shell splinters. It is fitted with NBC protection and automatic fire suppression systems.

== Operational history ==
In April 2015, the Saudi Arabian Army used the PLZ-45 for shelling Houthi rebels along the Saudi Arabia–Yemen border during the Saudi Arabian–led intervention in the Yemeni Civil War. This was the first time the PLZ-45 has been used in combat. In late 2015, Kuwait sent an artillery battalion to Saudi Arabia to assist its Saudi ally against the Houthis.

== Operators ==
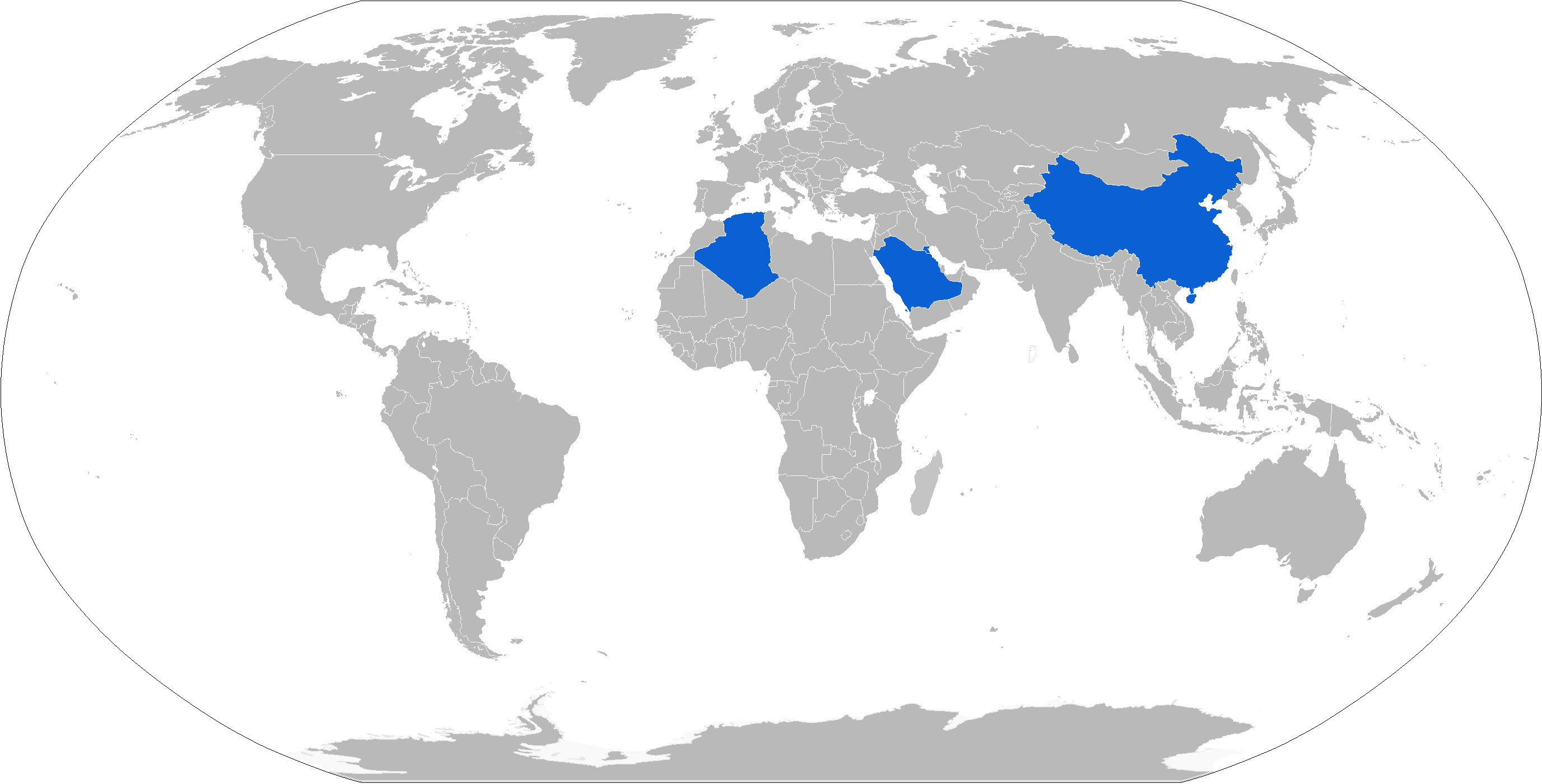
Map with PLZ-45 operators in blue

=== Current operators ===
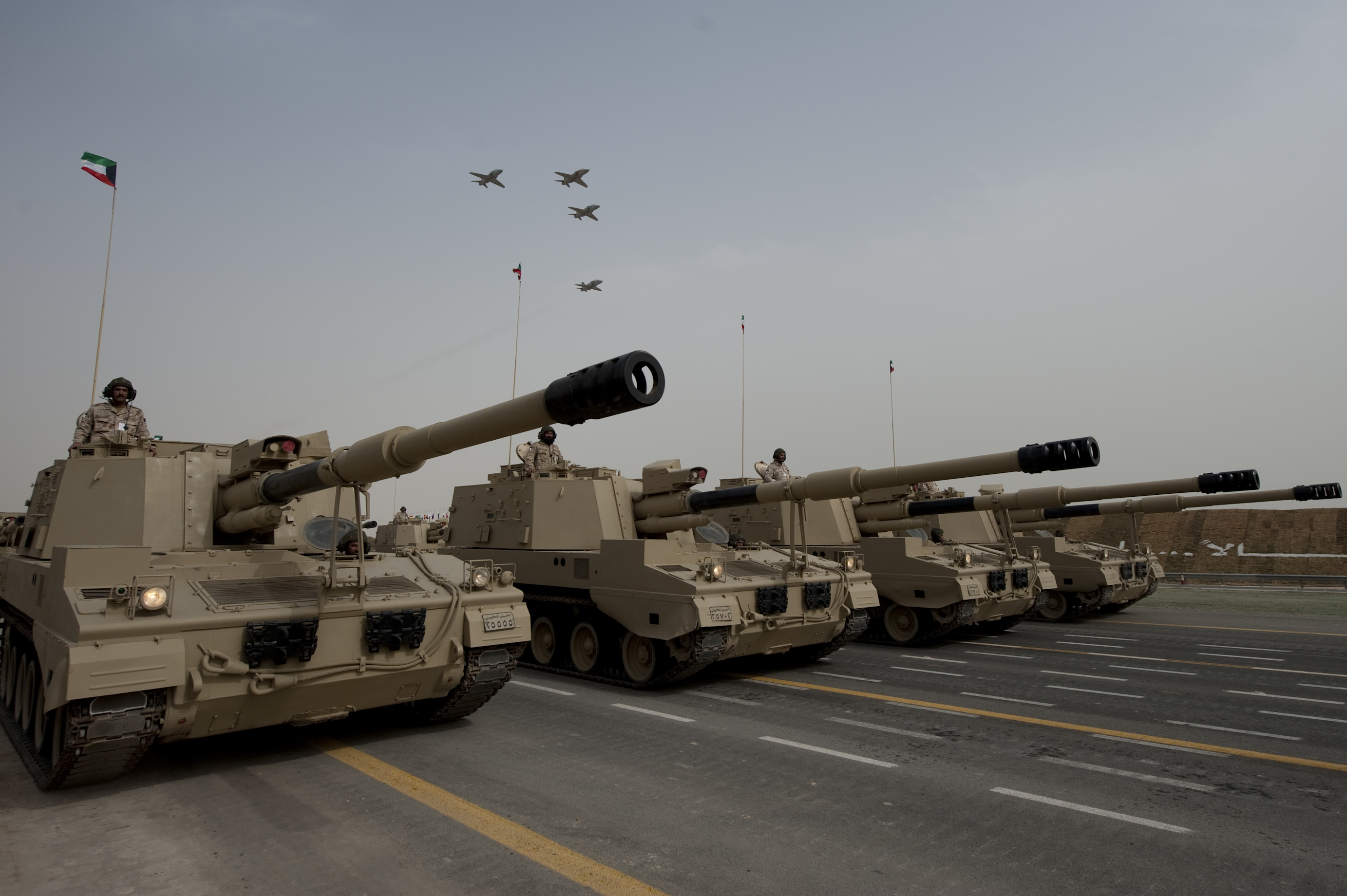
Kuwaiti PLZ-45 self-propelled guns roll during the Kuwaiti National Day Military Parade on 26 February 2011

- Algeria: 50 have been delivered. First appearance was in 2014.
- China: Used by the People's Liberation Army.
- Ethiopia: 18 delivered in 1999.
- Kuwait: (51) 27 PLZ-45s (to form a training platoon and the first battalion) ordered in 1998 and delivered in 2000–2001. 24 more howitzers (to form the second battalion) were ordered in 2001 and delivered in 2002–2003.
- Saudi Arabia: (54) In 2007, it was reported that the Saudi Arabian Army had decided to order two battalions (54 units) of the PLZ-45 artillery system. In August 2008, China signed a contract to provide Saudi Arabia with one battalion, i.e. 27 PLZ-45 155 mm self-propelled howitzers. Another contract to supply one more battalion (27 more PLZ-45 self-propelled guns) was signed later in the month. The howitzers were delivered between 2008 and 2009.

=== Potential operators ===
- Pakistan
- Morocco

== See also ==
- PLZ-05 – (China)
- 2S19 Msta-S – (Soviet Union, Russia)
- Panzerhaubitze 2000 – (Germany)
- K9 Thunder – (South Korea)
- T-155 Fırtına – (Turkey)
- Type 99 155 mm self-propelled howitzer – (Japan)
- GC-45 howitzer – (Canada)
- M109A6 Paladin – (United States)
