= WAC-21 =

Chinese 155mm howitzer

WAC-21 155mm howitzer
- Type: Howitzer
- Place of origin: People's Republic of China and other operators

Service history
- In service: 1987–present
- Used by: People's Republic of China

Production history
- Designer: Gerald Bull
- Designed: 1980s
- Produced: 1980s–present

Specifications
- Barrel length: 45 calibres
- Caliber: 155 mm (6.1 in)

The WAC-21 (also called Type 88 and WA021/PLL01) is a Chinese 155 mm howitzer produced by Norinco, It was developed with the assistance of Gerald Bull.

== History ==
By the late-1970s, Gerald Bull was aiding the development of longer-ranged 155 mm caliber guns based on the Space Research Corporation's (SRC) GC-45 howitzer. An early result was the GHN-45 howitzer from Voest-Alpine's subsidiary, Noricum. Over four years starting From the early-1980s, SRC helped China develop and produce the WAC-21 gun, which was a "virtual clone" of the GHN-45, and ammunition. Iraq reportedly ordered the WAC-21 in 1987.

== Operators ==
=== Current ===
- Iran - 15
- Pakistan - 90, mounted on WS5252 6x6 (designated Norinco SH-1).

=== Former ===
- China - 150 in 2012; retired by 2014.
- Iraq - 120 in 1991

== See also ==
- PLZ-45, self-propelled artillery armed with the WAC-21.
