= Type 83 SPH =

Type 83 Self-Propelled Howitzer
- Type: Self-propelled artillery
- Place of origin: China

Production history
- Designed: 1980
- Produced: 1983 – 1990

Specifications
- Mass: 30 tons
- Length: 9.8 m (32 ft 2 in)
- Width: 3.24 m (10 ft 8 in)
- Height: 3.50 m (11 ft 6 in) with AAMG
- Crew: 5
- Caliber: 152 mm (6.0 in)
- Traverse: 360°
- Main armament: 152 mm howitzer
- Secondary armament: 12.7 mm anti-aircraft machine gun
- Engine: WR4B-12V150LB 12-cyl diesel 520 hp (382 kW)
- Suspension: torsion bar
- Operational range: 450 km (280 mi)
- Maximum speed: 55 km/h (35 mph)

The Type 83 (military designation: PLZ-83) is a 152 mm (6.0 in) self-propelled howitzer used by the People's Liberation Army of China.

The Type 83 self-propelled gun system was developed by Factory 674 (Harbin First Machinery Building Group Ltd). The project's development started in the late 1970s, and the prototype was completed in February 1980, followed by a second in 1981. Production was authorized in 1983 under the designation Type 83. The first production run started in May 1983, and the first public display was on 1 October 1984. This self-propelled gun is similar to the 2S3, with a modified version of the Type 66 gun and a Type 321 utility tracked chassis and is the first modern self-propelled gun in service with the People's Liberation Army. Production ended in 1990, after 780 examples were built. Manufacturing also involved factory 5318 (artillery), 298 (aiming), 754, and 843.

The vehicle chassis is Type 321 tracked chassis, sharing with artillery platforms such as PHZ-89 and PTZ-89. Unlike the U.S. M109 howitzer, this self-propelled gun is made from steel and not aluminum alloy. It has six wheels on each side, with the engine in the forward hull. There is stowage for 30 shells, including a Chinese version of the Krasnopol laser ammunition. The elevation is 0-62°, giving a range of 17 km (11 mi). There is also base-bleed ammunition with improved range, cluster, and fragmentation projectiles. A secondary weapon, a 12.7 mm (0.50 in) machine gun, is also mounted on the turret. The engine is a 520 hp (390 kW) WR4B-12V150LB four-stroke, liquid-cooled diesel engine. The maximum speed is 55 km/h (34 mph) with a range of 450 km (280 mi).

The typical Chinese artillery regiment (one for each armoured division) has 18 artillery pieces organized as one battalion with three batteries. Not long after entering service, it was determined to be obsolescent, and China started to develop new systems, like the PLZ-45 (mainly for the international market) and the real Type 83's replacement, the PLZ-05.

== Operators ==
China

- People's Liberation Army Ground Force - 150 PLZ-82/83
