= Al-Fao =

Iraqi self-propelled artillery

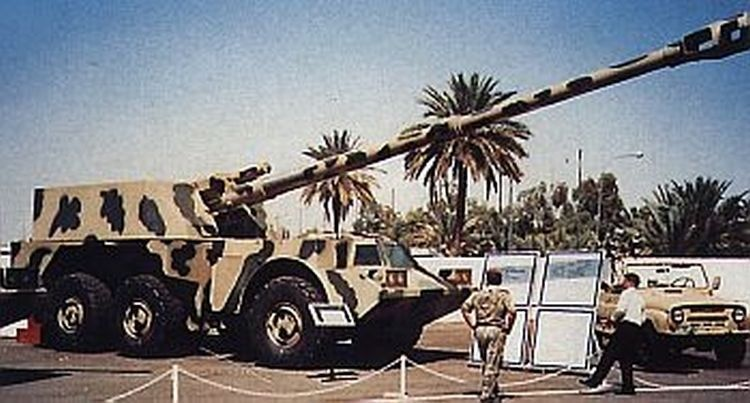
- Al-Fao prototype on display at the Baghdad Arms Exhibition, 1989
- Type: Self-propelled artillery
- Place of origin: Iraq

Production history
- Designer: Gerald Bull
- Designed: 1988–1990
- Manufacturer: Taji industrial complex
- No. built: 2 prototypes
- Variants: Majnoon

Specifications (Al-Fao)
- Mass: 48,000 kg (106,000 lb)
- Length: 15 m (49 ft)
- Barrel length: 11.13 m (36.5 ft)
- Width: 3.5 m (11 ft)
- Height: 3.6 m (12 ft)
- Shell weight: 109.4 kg (241 lb)
- Caliber: 210 mm (8.3 in)
- Elevation: 0° to +55°
- Traverse: 40°
- Rate of fire: 4 rpm
- Muzzle velocity: 997 m/s (3,270 ft/s)
- Effective firing range: 45,000 m (49,000 yd)
- Maximum firing range: 57,340 m (62,710 yd)
- Main armament: 1× 210 mm (8.3 in) gun
- Engine: Mercedes-Benz, diesel 550 hp (410 kW)
- Drive: 6×6
- Transmission: Manual
- Maximum speed: 90 km/h (56 mph)

Al-Fao was a project for a self-propelled artillery system designed for the former Iraqi Army by the Canadian weapons engineer Gerald Bull. It would have been one of the world's most powerful artillery pieces, with a 53-caliber, 210 mm (8.3 in) gun firing 109-kilogram shells over a range of 57 km (35 mi). The Al-Fao system was to weigh 44 tonnes, and its 550 hp engine was to give it a top speed of 90 km/h (56 mph) on roads, and 60–70 km/h (37–43 mph) cross-country. The Al-Fao's autoloader was to provide it with a rate of fire of four rounds a minute.

A self-propelled howitzer using the same 155 mm gun as the South African G6, similar to the Al-Fao and named Majnoon, was also designed by Gerald Bull on an Iraqi order.

== Design ==
Both the Al-Fao and Majnoon prototypes used a 6×6 chassis with a turret mounted atop the rear with a large rear door to replenish the vehicle ammunition supply, two doors on both sides for the crew, and two hydraulic rams to damp the recoil forces on the chassis. The Majnoon had a 155 mm (6.1 in) gun fitted with a fume extractor and a three-slotted muzzle brake, while the Al-Fao was fitted with a 210 mm (8.3 in) gun also fitted with a fume extractor but with a double baffle muzzle brake. A direct fire sight was fitted on the left side of the ordnance.

The lower part of the hull had small hatches for the crew on either side, while the cab had a single hatch for the driver, who sat in front of the powerpack. Both designs had no shutters on the windshield, used a Mercedes-Benz diesel engine developing 540 hp (400 kW) coupled with a manual transmission, and a central tire pressure regulation system; Christopher F Foss noted that the prototypes lacked spades, which would provide a more stable firing platform if fitted.

The Al-Fao and Majnoon could fire Extended range full bore (ERFB) and ERFB-base bleed (ERFB-BB) ammunition, which were already in use in Iraq with the 155 mm GHN-45 and the G5 howitzer. The 210 mm shell design was an enlarged version with a much larger high explosive payload.

== Specifications ==
Comparison between the Majnoon and Al-Fao
Model	Majnoon	Al-Fao
Weight	43,000 kg (95,000 lb)	48,000 kg (106,000 lb)
Length	12 m (39 ft)	15 m (49 ft)
Width	3.5 m (11 ft)	3.5 m (11 ft)
Max road speed	90 km/h (56 mph)	90 km/h (56 mph)
Off-road speed	60–70 km/h (37–43 mph)	60–70 km/h (37–43 mph)
Armament	1× 155 mm (6.1 in) gun	1× 210 mm (8.3 in) gun
Barrel length	8.06 m (26.4 ft)	11.13 m (36.5 ft)
Elevation	0° to +72°	0° to +55°
Traverse	40° left/right	40° left/right
Range (ERFB)	30,200 m (33,000 yd)	45,000 m (49,000 yd)
Muzzle velocity (ERFB)	900 m/s (3,000 ft/s)	997 m/s (3,270 ft/s)
Range (ERFB-BB)	38,800 m (42,400 yd)	57,340 m (62,710 yd)
Muzzle velocity (ERFB-BB)	889 m/s (2,920 ft/s)	992 m/s (3,250 ft/s)
Projectile weight	45.5 kg (100 lb)	109.4 kg (241 lb)
Maximum rate of fire	4 rpm	4 rpm
Sustained rate of fire	1 rpm	1 rpm
		Iraqi Al Fao Howitzer

== History ==
The design of the Majnoon and Al-Fao started around 1988. That year, South Africa had tried to sell the G6 howitzer to Iraq, but the Iraqis found it too expensive, and requested that Bull design two equivalents for them. Prototypes of each model had to be ready by May 1989, in time for the Baghdad International Arms Fair. Numerous French, German and Spanish companies were contracted to manufacture parts for the guns, while the design for the chassis was bought in Czechoslovakia and modified to South African specifications. The deadline was met, and the prototypes of both Majnoon and Al-Fao were presented at the Arms Fair, although these were far from complete. However, by early 1990, the Iraqis had imported all the know-how, equipment and machinery necessary to produce them, as well as ammunition. Subsequent events prevented the realisation of the Majnoon and Al-Fao projects.

== See also ==
- List of artillery
