= European route E651 =

Road in trans-European E-road network

E651

Route information
- Length: 73 km (45 mi)

Major junctions
- From: Altenmarkt im Pongau
- To: Liezen

Location
- Countries: Austria

Highway system
- International E-road network; A Class; B Class

European route E 651 is a European B class road in Austria, connecting the cities Altenmarkt im Pongau – Liezen

== Route ==
- Austria
  - Altenmarkt im Pongau
  - E57 Liezen
