= Noricum scandal =

Austrian arms export scandal

The Noricum scandal, or Noricum affair was an Austrian arms export scandal centering on the illegal export of weapons to Iran, by VOEST subsidiary Noricum during the 1980s. Noricum was named after the Roman geographical area Noricum.

== See also ==
- Noricum Maschinenbau und Handel, based in Liezen, company involved in manufacturer of the arms
- GC-45 howitzer, armaments product exported illegally
- Alfred Worm, journalist involved in uncovering the scandal
