= T-155 Firtina =

Turkish 155 mm self-propelled howitzer

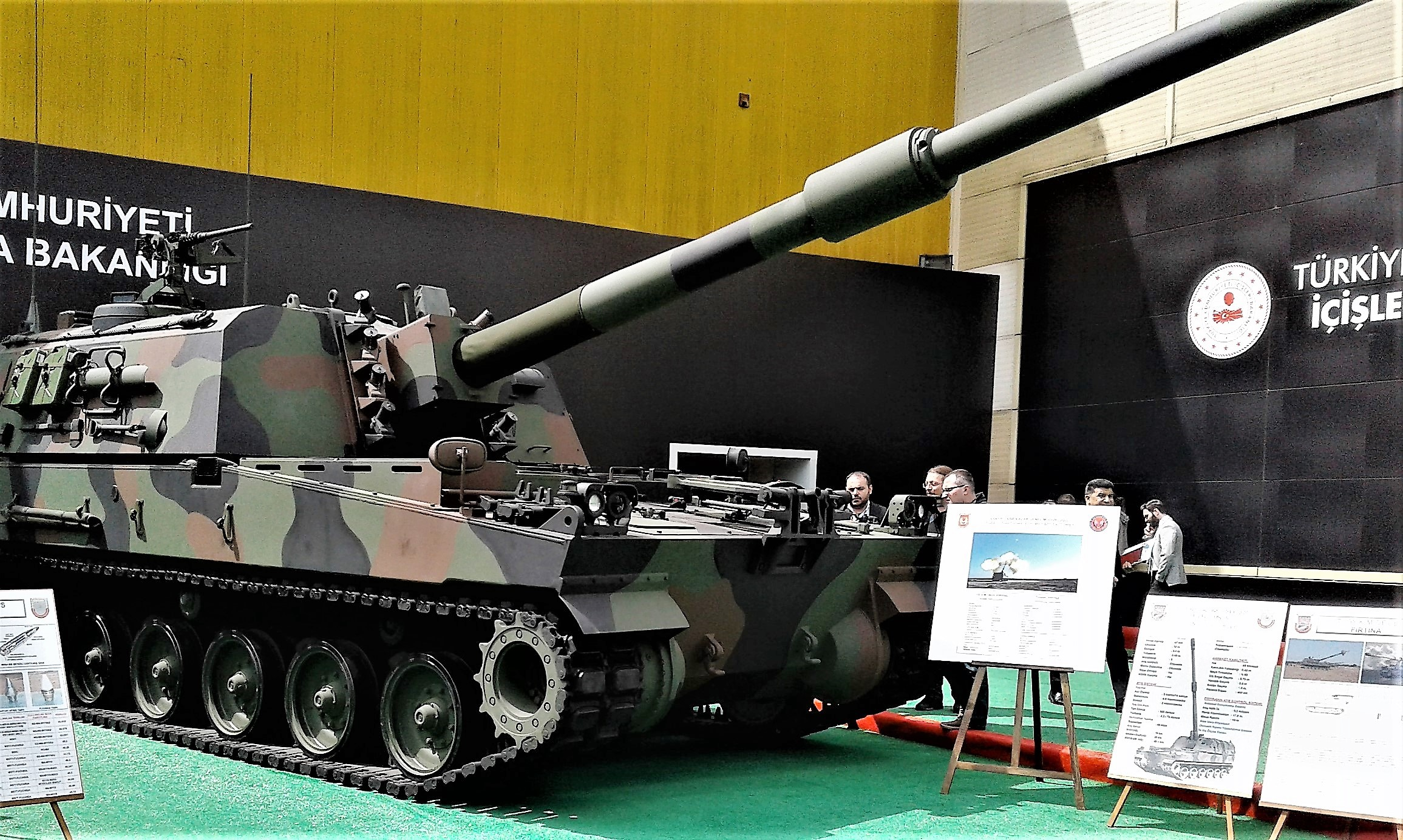
- Type: Self-propelled artillery
- Place of origin: Turkey; South Korea

Service history
- Wars: Kurdish–Turkish conflict; Operation Sun; Syrian civil war; Syrian–Turkish clashes; Operation Euphrates Shield; Operation Olive Branch; Operation Peace Spring; Second Libyan Civil War; Operation Peace Storm

Production history
- Designer: Agency for Defense Development (tech-transfer); Samsung Techwin (tech-transfer); Turkish Land Forces (design); Aselsan (sub-systems)
- Designed: 2000–2004
- Manufacturer: Turkish Land Forces (2004–2015); Mechanical and Chemical Industry Corporation (2015–2019); BMC Defence (2019–present)
- Produced: F1: 2004–2014; F2: 2019–present
- Variants: Fırtına II

Specifications
- Mass: F1:47 t (46 long tons; 52 short tons)
- Length: F1:12 m (39 ft 4 in)
- Width: F1:3.4 m (11 ft 2 in)
- Height: F1:3.43 m (11 ft 3 in)
- Crew: 5 (commander, driver, gunner, 2 loaders)
- Maximum firing range: 18 km (M107, HE); 30 km (M549A1, RAP/HE); 39 km (MOD 274, HE/ER); 41 km (K307, BB/HE)
- Armor: POSCO MIL-12560H armor steel
- Main armament: MKE 155 mm 52 caliber
- Secondary armament: F1:12.7 mm machine gun F2:RCWS 12.7 mm
- Engine: F1:MTU MT881Ka-500 8-cylinder water-cooled diesel engine F2a: Continental AV1790-9A 12-cylinder water-cooled diesel engine F2b: BMC UTKU 12-cylinder water-cooled diesel engine F1:735 kW (1,000 hp) @ 2,700 rpm F2:1,300hp
- Power/weight: F1:21 hp/t (15.44 kW/t)
- Transmission: F1:SNT Dynamics X1100-5A3 4-forward, 2-reverse F2a:Allison Transmission X1100-5A4 4-forward 2-reverse F2b:BMC 5-forward 2-reverse
- Suspension: hydropneumatic
- Ground clearance: F1:420 mm (17 in)
- Operational range: F1:360 km (220 mi)
- Maximum speed: F1:65 km/h (40 mph)

T-155 Fırtına (Turkish for Storm) is a Turkish artillery based on K9 Thunder self-propelled howitzer. It is manufactured by technology transfer from South Korea with Turkish made sub-systems.

== Development ==
In light of lessons learned from the 155mm M-44T and M-52T self-propelled howitzer modernization programs, the T-155 Fırtına Modern Howitzer Development Program was initiated in 1995, taking into account the tactical and technical concepts of use and the future battlefield fire support needs of the Turkish Land Forces artillery units.

Design and prototype production efforts within the scope of the program began in 1995 under the Project Management of the Weapons and Ammunition Branch Directorate of the Land Forces Technical and Project Management Department. The first prototype, equipped with a 155mm/39 caliber gun with a maximum range of 30 km, was produced in 1997. However, due to the need for a longer range, it was decided that the new howitzer would be equipped with a 155/52 caliber gun system. Production of the second prototype howitzer, equipped with a 155mm/52 caliber gun system and a 40 km range to meet the Land Forces' needs, began in 2000. The hull and turret designs and analyses of the howitzer were performed entirely in a computer environment using modern design programs. Production of the prototype howitzer's hull, turret, and suspension systems was completed in September 2000, and the integration of components procured from abroad was completed in December 2000.

During prototype production, Turkey planned to use subsystems from the German-made PzH 2000 howitzer in the new howitzer. However, after the German Federal Security Council rejected the export license for the sale of PzH 2000 howitzer subsystems, these systems were procured from the South Korean company Samsung Techwin. The prototype howitzer was designed according to the shoot and scout principle in accordance with the One-Top-One Battery Concept.

A contract was signed between South Korea and Turkey in July 2001 for the procurement of some subsystems (autoloader, complete 155mm/52 caliber gun system). Currently, all subsystems except the power pack are produced in Türkiye. It was initially assembled by Turkish Land Forces at the 1010th Army Equipment Repair Factory, then by MKEK and currently by BMC.

It has an ongoing local engine design project in order to avoid restrictions on Turkey's defense sales.

== General characteristics ==
The T-155 retains most of the K9's features, such as the CN98 155 mm barrel and most of the chassis parts, produced through the technology transfer of Agency for Defense Development (ADD) in South Korea. However, its turret reflects original Turkish design that decreased magazine capacity from 32 to 30 while increasing hull ammunition storage from 16 to 18. APU (auxiliary power unit) is installed while panoramic scope, which is used for manual firing, is removed. The electronic systems such as; INS (inertial navigation system), FCS (fire control system) and comms radio are developed by ASELSAN.

The howitzer is able to determine the coordinates of the targets at 17.5 meters deviation. Firtina can open fire within thirty seconds.

The gun is produced by MKEK under license by transferring the production technology of the K9's CN98 155 mm barrel from ADD. The production rate of the T-155 is 24 units per year. More than 350 T-155 Firtina howitzers were planned to be produced. 281 have been delivered between 2005 and 2010. The T-155 Firtina has a maximum firing range of 40 km, depending on the type of ammunition. It can reach a top speed of 65 km/h.

Turkey originally planned to manufacture 350 Fırtına, 280 for Turkish Army and 70 for future customer, by 2011 per agreement with South Korea in exchange for free technology transfer from the Agency for Defense Development of South Korea. Turkey built 280 for its own military.

== Operational history ==
The T-155 Firtina was first deployed in Turkey's Operation Sun at the end of 2007 into January 2008 to fight the PKK militants in the northern part of Iraq. It was used in 2012 Syrian–Turkish border clashes and again during both the Jarabulus offensive (2016) and the Afrin offensive (2018). At least one T-155 was damaged during the East Aleppo offensive (2024) by an FPV drone, with one more possibly damaged as well.

== Variants ==
=== Poyraz ARV ===
The Poyraz ammunition resupply vehicle (ARV) is based on South Korean K10 ARV. The servo control system, electronic systems, and software were developed by Aselsan. The vehicle has a boom that is extended towards the rear of the T-155 Firtina turret, where the resupply takes place. The Poyraz ARV has an auxiliary power unit, which the K10 ARV lacks, that allows the vehicle's crew to use electronics and communication systems, and to run an ammunition transfer system economically without the main engines being turned on.

The Poyraz ARV can carry up to 96 155 mm shells and is able to transfer 48 shells in 20 minutes. It has a range of 360 km.

=== Fırtına II ===
It has been developed as the most up-to-date version of the T-155 Fırtına howitzer. The Ministry of National Defense's 1st Main Maintenance Factory in Sakarya's Arifiye district has begun mass production of the new-generation howitzer, of 140 units.

Work on the Fırtına 2's turret has begun with sheet metal cutting, and it will be manufactured with numerous new features. The turret and barrel guidance system have been upgraded to fully electric and servo-controlled, while numerous updated electronic components have been added. Accuracy and rate of fire have been improved, and a power conditioning unit has been added to these systems, while its loading has also been automated. The remote-controlled weapon system, RCWS SARP, has been integrated into the system to address threats the howitzer may encounter at close range. ASELSAN recently announced the signing of a contract for the 40 km-range T-155 K/M Fırtına Howitzer Fire Control System.

Firtina 2 upgrade features:

- New powertrain (both local and imported)
- Enhanced fire control system (FCS)
- Autoloader
- Driver's vision
- Automatic fire extinguishing system
- Air-conditioning
- Remote control weapon station (RCWS)
- Refurbished suspension
- Enhanced auxiliary power unit (APU)

=== E-Fırtına ===
Developed as an electric version of the T-155 Fırtına I howitzer. Produced with 100% domestic capital, it boasts numerous features, including silent operation and concealment from thermal cameras. The project was completed and implemented by Anzatsan in collaboration with MKEK and Aselsan.

Features:

- Hybrid (electric motor-driven diesel generator-supported) 1300 hp Power System
- Lithium-based modular battery pack with a capacity of at least 350 kWh
- Domestically produced software and hardware developed and manufactured with advanced technology, eliminating supply problems
- Industrial task processor
- 360° double-track rotation and right and left pivoting
- Fault Tracking and Notification System
- Five driving modes: Parking, Transport, Driving, Training/Drill, and Combat
- Energy Management System to program energy consumption in the most efficient way
- Ability to cross 5 m of water, 0.6 m of vertical obstacles, and 1.7 m of trenches

== Operators ==
=== Current operators ===
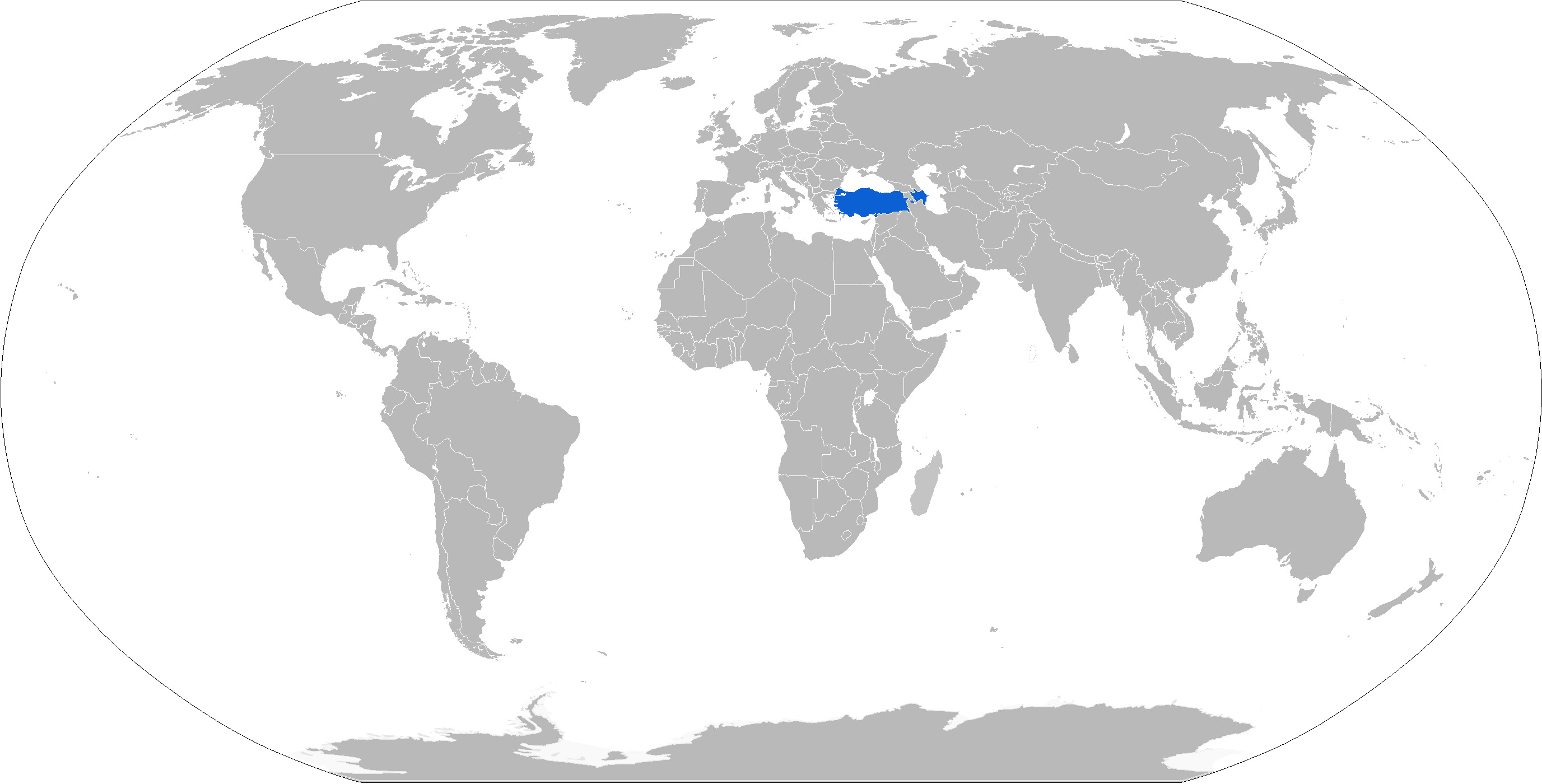
Current operators of Fırtına

- Turkey: 280 Fırtına I and 40 Fırtına II with US-engine are delivered. 140 Fırtına II with local engine on order.
- Azerbaijan: 36 units were ordered. One was delivered for evaluation. The remaining are on hold until the local powerpack is fielded.
- Libya: 7+ units were transferred during the Libyan Civil.

=== Potential operators ===
- Qatar: In February 2019, Turkish Defense Minister Hulusi Akar said he was on the verge of signing an export deal for T-155 with Qatar. As of September 2023, there was no signed contract.
- Ukraine: On 5 July 2023, Oleksiy Gromov, Deputy Chief of the Ukrainian Armed Forces, said he hoped to acquire a T-155.

=== Failed bids ===
- Saudi Arabia: The deal did not proceed because Germany's arms embargo prevented it from supplying German MTU engines for the T-155.

== See also ==
=== Similar vehicles ===
- AS-90 – (United Kingdom)
- AHS Krab – (Poland)
- 2S19 Msta-S – (Soviet Union, Russia)
- Panzerhaubitze 2000 – (Germany)
- PLZ-05 – (China)
- PLZ-45 – (China)
- Type 99 155 mm self-propelled howitzer – (Japan)
