= Gordon Patterson =

Canadian physicist (1908–1990)

Gordon Neil Patterson, OC (1908–1990) was a Canadian physicist, and founder of the University of Toronto Institute for Aerospace Studies (UTIAS).

== Early life and career ==
Patterson was born in Thornbury, Ontario in 1908. He graduated from the University of Alberta with an undergraduate degree in Engineering Physics, later completing a doctorate in physics at the University of Toronto in 1935.

After graduation he conducted aerodynamics research at the Royal Aircraft Establishment in the United Kingdom, in Australia, and in the USA at Caltech and Princeton, and with the US Navy. He joined the University of Toronto in 1947, and in 1949 he was the founding director of the University of Toronto Institute for Aerospace Studies. One of his students in the early years of UTIAS was controversial Canadian physicist Gerald Bull.

From 1958 to 1959 he served as President of the Canadian Aeronautics and Space Institute. Starting in 1961 he began nine years on the technical panel of Canada's National Research Council, as well as being an advisor to NASA from 1962-1965.

== Order of Canada Citation ==
On November 17, 1988 he was awarded the Order of Canada, in the grade of Officer. His citation reads:

He is widely regarded as Canada's "Father of Aerophysics". He founded the Institute for Aerospace Studies at the University of Toronto and was one of the authors of the Science Council of Canada's first report. His work helped establish Canada's international role in space research and has inspired generations of Canadian and international students in aerospace and engineering.
