= GC-45 howitzer =

GC-45 155 mm Howitzer
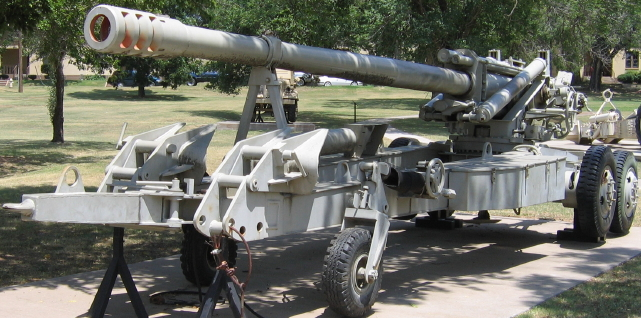
- An ex-Iraqi GHN-45 at the U.S. Army Field Artillery Museum, Ft. Sill, Oklahoma in travel mode
- Type: Howitzer
- Place of origin: Canada

Service history
- In service: 1970s-present
- Used by: See users
- Wars: Iran–Iraq War; Gulf War; Cambodian–Thai border dispute 2025 Cambodia–Thailand clashes

Production history
- Designer: Gerald Bull
- Designed: 1970s
- Manufacturer: Space Research Corporation, Noricum, NORINCO
- Produced: 1980s-Present
- Variants: GHN-45, PLL01

Specifications
- Mass: 8,220 kg (18,120 lb)
- Barrel length: 6.98 meters
- Caliber: 155 mm (6.1 in.)
- Carriage: Split trail
- Elevation: -89 to 1,280 mils
- Traverse: Left 534 mils, Right 711 mils
- Rate of fire: maximum: 5 rpm sustained: 2 rpm
- Muzzle velocity: 897 metres per second (2,940 ft/s)
- Maximum firing range: 39.6 km (24.6 mi) with Base bleed

The GC-45 (Gun, Canada, 45-calibre) is a 155 mm howitzer designed by Gerald Bull's Space Research Corporation (SRC) in the 1970s. Versions were produced by a number of companies during the 1980s, notably in Austria and South Africa.

The most publicized use of the design was in Iraq, where the GHN-45 variant used by some Iraqi artillery units had a longer range than any coalition cannon systems. This initially caused considerable worry on the part of the allied forces in the Persian Gulf War.

== Design history ==
The GC-45's general design followed several decades of work by Bull with fin-stabilized artillery shells, starting at the Canadian Armament Research and Development Establishment (CARDE) and later at Project HARP. In these efforts accuracy was not a huge concern, the objective was muzzle velocity, and the test articles were finned darts representing missiles, a low-cost alternative to wind tunnels. Yet with the removal of the rifling and the soft-metal driving band on the shell itself, the shell could be designed purely for ballistics, as opposed to having the external constraint of the driving band. A system combining some sort of rifling for accuracy without a driving band would result in a longer-range weapon. However, such a design was never achieved.

After years of research at his Quebec firing range, Bull could never settle on to a solution. The resulting Extended Range, Full Bore (ERFB) ammunition was key to SRC's designs: a "pointy" looking shell with much lower drag at supersonic speeds. For longer range applications he added a base bleed system (invented in Sweden) that could be screwed onto the standard shell, as well as an even longer-ranged system with a rocket booster.

The gun designed to fire it had a 23,000 cm^{3} (1,400 cu in) chamber, a 45-calibre rifled barrel with 1/20 right hand twist fitted with a conventional muzzle brake. Its breech was a conventional screw with interrupted thread.

Key performance data, from the Firing Table are:

- ERFB-BB shell, weight 48.0 kg (105.9 lb), M11 Zone 10 muzzle velocity 897 m/s (2,940 ft/s), QE 898 mils, time of flight 112 s, range 39.6 km (24.6 mi; 130,000 ft). Probable error in range 212 m (696 ft), in line 36 m (118 ft).
- ERFB shell, weight 45.5 kg (100.4 lb), M11 Zone 10 muzzle velocity 897 m/s (2,940 ft/s), QE 881 mils, time of flight 99 s, range 29.9 km (18.6 mi; 98,000 ft). Probable error in range 189 metres (620 ft), in line 42 metres (138 ft).
- HE M107 shell, weight 43 kg (95 lb), M119 Zone 8 muzzle velocity 675 m/s (2,210 ft/s), QE 764 mils, time of flight 65 s, range 17.8 km (11.1 mi; 58,000 ft). Probable error in range 59 m (194 ft), in line 12 m (39 ft).

The dispersion of the EFRB shell is more than three times that of the FH-70 field howitzer at its maximum range of only 5 km less, and is twice as great as FH-70s at 20 km (66,000 ft; 12 mi). Its maximum range with the M107 projectile is the same as any 39 calibre 155-mm gun and its dispersion about the same. (The "dispersion" figure means that 50% of shells will fall up to the stated distance either side of the mean point of impact, but 100% will fall within 4 times the probable error either side.) Dispersion of this magnitude significantly reduces the tactical value of the equipment.

In 1977, Bull's work put him in touch with (what is today) the Denel SOC Ltd company of South Africa. Denel designed a new mobile mounting that was able to handle the increased recoil. It used a sole-plate to lift the carriage to take the four wheels off the ground. The chassis had the option of being powered by a small diesel engine acting as an auxiliary power unit, driving hydraulics that could set up the gun in two minutes, and move it short distances. This feature had previously been included in the 1960s design FH-70 carriage by Vickers. Bull, meanwhile, started production of $30 million worth of rounds, shipping them via Spain to avoid the international arms embargo against South Africa.

At first, the U.S. chose to overlook Bull's actions and, according to him, the Central Intelligence Agency actively mediated the deal between Space Research and the South Africans. However, when the Carter administration joined the international efforts to sanction South Africa's apartheid government, Bull was arrested by U.S. Customs agents in 1980. The investigation did not go far, and active work on the case was ended by direct intervention of the White House. Bull pleaded guilty and was sentenced to a year in prison, serving six months. Having expected some sort of "slap on the wrist", he was embittered and made statements to different newspapers that he would never set foot in North America again. He left Canada and moved to Brussels where he continued his work.

== Production ==
Armscor continued work on their version of the gun, and these were put into service in South Africa in 1982 as the G5. They started replacing a variety of older guns, such as locally-built World War II-era Ordnance QF 25 pounders. The G5s saw service against Cuban and People's Armed Forces for the Liberation of Angola forces in the Angolan conflict, where they were used very effectively.

Noricum, the arms division of the Austrian steel company Voest-Alpine, purchased the design rights to the GC-45 after SRC moved to Europe. They made a number of detail changes to improve mass production, resulting in the GHN-45 (Gun, Howitzer, Noricum), which was offered in a variety of options like the APU and fire control systems. The first foreign sale was an order for eighteen guns with ammunition to the Royal Thai Navy for use by their Marine Corps. Other "aboveboard" customers included China, Singapore and Israel. All of these companies worked on local production under a variety of names, the Soltam 845P in Israel, ODE FH-88 from Singapore, and PLL01/WA021 in China.

Once out of prison, Bull was soon contacted by China. The Chinese People's Liberation Army also used the Noricum version, producing it as the PLL01, which entered service in 1987. They also mounted it on a locally designed tracked chassis to produce the PLZ-45 (also known as the Type 88), along with an ammo-carrier based on the same chassis. The PLZ-45 did not enter service with the PLA primarily because their existing artillery was all based on Soviet-standard 152 mm ammunition. However, two major batches of PLZ-45s were sold to the Kuwait and Saudi Arabia.

Also Bull was contacted by Iraq, which was constantly being attacked by Iranian artillery during the Iran–Iraq War. Iraq placed a US$300 million contract for 110 guns from Noricum in Austria and 41,000 rounds subcontracted by SRC to PRB in Belgium. Deliveries were made in 1984 and 1985. The number of guns was eventually raised to 200. Iran and Iraq were under arms embargo at the time, so the guns were shipped to Jordan, and from there to Iraq. These sales led to the "Noricum affair" in 1990, when eighteen of Noricum's managers were placed on trial for illegal arms sales. A further 100 guns were manufactured in South Africa.

In Iraq the guns had a similar effect on the ongoing Iran–Iraq War as the G5 had in Angola, stopping any push by the Iranians deeper into Iraq. They became desperate to get more of these guns into the field as soon as possible, and requested that Bull improve deliveries any way he could. Bull then arranged a deal to deliver the G5, which fired the same ammunition as the GHN-45, from South Africa. By the time of the Gulf War, about 124 of these weapons had been added to the Iraqi long-range artillery, supplanting their older 130 mm M-46s and chaotic mix of other weapons. Bull and Saddam Hussein became partners in a number of future ventures. These ventures are generally believed to be the cause of Bull's assassination, for which the Israeli Mossad or Iranian agencies are the prime suspects.

During the Gulf War, however, the GHN-45s proved less effective than anticipated by either side. Air strikes had disrupted the Iraqi command and control facilities, and because most of their gun tractors had been withdrawn to serve with logistics units in an attempt to re-supply the front line troops, they were unable to withdraw when under fire. Immobile and unsupported, the majority of the guns were destroyed at their positions either by air strikes or Multiple Launch Rocket Systems (MLRS) counter-battery fire.

Bull continued work on the GC-45, producing a much more practical version known as the FGH-155. In addition to a number of detail changes and deeper rifling, the FGH-155 allowed standard M107 ammunition to be fired using a plastic adaptor ring. Bull also felt that the FGH-155's carriage was suitable for a larger gun, and worked on the FGH-203, an 8" (203 mm) gun adapted from U.S. standards in a fashion similar to the original GC-45 work. The increase in projectile weight gave the new weapon a range of over 50,000 meters with normal ERFB-BB ammunition, making it one of the longest-range artillery pieces in the world. The gun was also purchased by the Iraqis, who mounted it in a self-propelled form to create the Al-Fao.

The Denel G5 version has also seen continued development. The gun has been placed on an OMC 6x6 chassis as the G6 howitzer, and won major export sales to the United Arab Emirates and Oman. In response to an Indian requirement, the G5 was mounted on a 4x4 truck, resulting in the T5, though as of 2012 none had been ordered. It is also fitted into a turret that can fit on any suitable vehicle. The turret is marketed as the T6 which has already been fitted on the T-72. Denel also used the basic ERFB ammunition concept to develop a 105 mm gun, the G7 howitzer, which allows artillery to be downsized to improve mobility.

Bharat Forge, an Indian firm of Kalyani Group, has recently purchased Noricum and brought the entire manufacturing workshop to India. It has made Bharat-52, a 52 caliber variant of the 155mm howitzer to meet the Indian Army's long delayed field artillery requirement.

== Operators ==
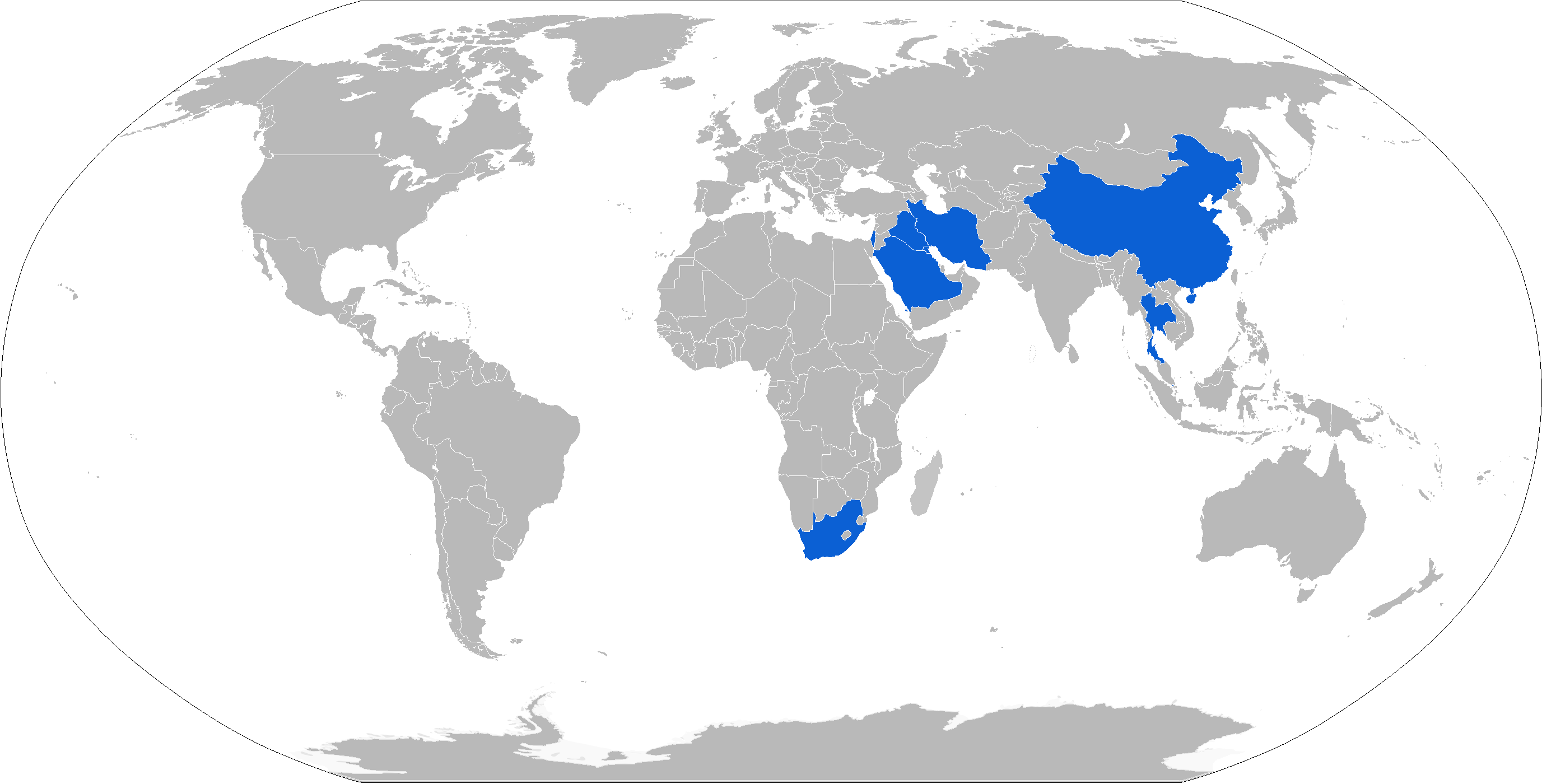
Map with GC-45 operators in blue

=== Current operators ===
- China
- Indonesia
- Iran
- Iraq
- Israel
- Jordan
- Kuwait
- Myanmar
- Oman
- Pakistan
- Saudi Arabia
- Singapore
- South Africa
- Thailand
  - Royal Thai Army: Operates 92 units.
- United Arab Emirates

== See also ==
- List of artillery
- G5 howitzer – (South Africa)
- Bharat-52
