= G5 howitzer =

LIW G5 155 mm Howitzer
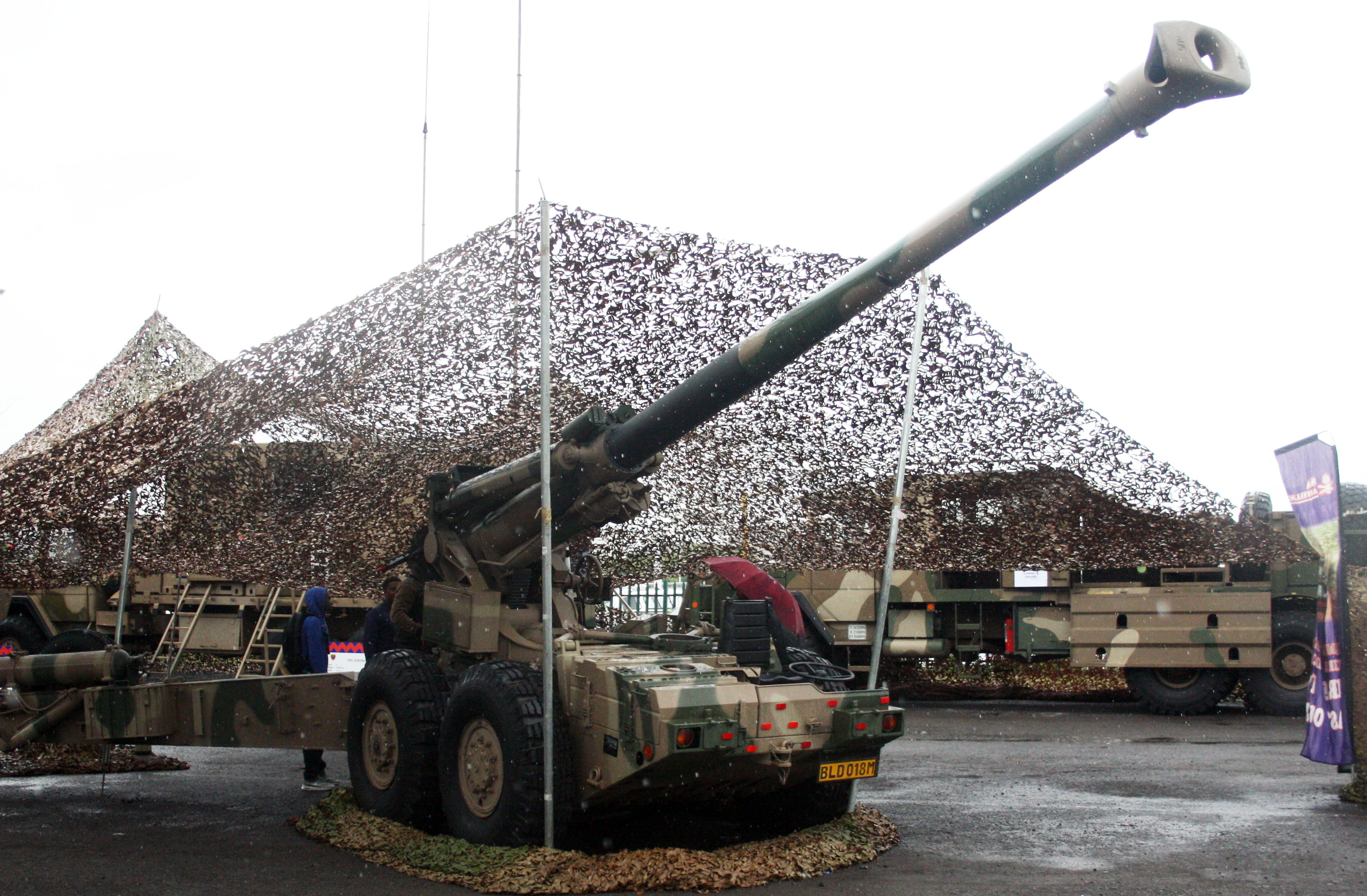
- G5 on display
- Type: Howitzer
- Place of origin: South Africa

Service history
- In service: 1983–present
- Used by: Operators
- Wars: South African Border War; Iran–Iraq War; Gulf War

Production history
- Designer: Lyttelton Engineering Works
- Designed: 1976–1983
- Manufacturer: Denel Land Systems
- Produced: 1982–present

Specifications
- Mass: 13,750 kg (30,314 lbs)
- Length: 9.5 m (31 ft 2 in)
- Barrel length: 6.975 m (22 ft 11 in) L/45
- Width: 3.3 m (10 ft 10 in)
- Height: 2.1 m (6 ft 11 in)
- Crew: 8 soldiers
- Shell: high explosive
- Calibre: 155 mm (6.10 in)
- Breech: Semi-automatic interrupted screw
- Carriage: Split trail
- Elevation: −3° to +75°
- Traverse: Up to 15°: 82° Above 15°: 65°
- Rate of fire: 3 rounds/minute
- Muzzle velocity: 897 m/s (2,943 ft/s)
- Maximum firing range: Standard: 30 km (19 mi); Base bleed: 40 km (25 mi); VLAP: 50 km (31 mi)
- Feed system: Breech-loaded

The G5 is a South African towed howitzer of 155 mm calibre developed in South Africa by Denel Land Systems. The G5 design was based on the Canadian GC-45 155 mm gun which was highly modified to suit southern African conditions.

== Production history ==
During the Angolan Bush War, the South African Defence Force found itself at a disadvantage when facing opponents equipped with long-range Soviet Katyusha rocket launchers, which outranged South Africa's World War II-era 5.5-inch (140 mm) howitzers by a considerable margin. This led to the issue of a staff requirement for a new artillery system as well as ammunition systems, gun tractor, fire control equipment and a fire control computer system.

From 1963, South Africa had been placed under a United Nations sponsored anti-apartheid arms embargo that led to the creation of the indigenous Armscor military-industrial company to circumvent the arms embargo and to produce weapons systems uniquely tailored to South Africa's needs. Armscor responded to the staff requirement and commenced development in 1976. A number of existing designs were evaluated and examples procured in contravention of the arms embargo. As an interim weapon system to act as a stop-gap during the indigenous production process, a number of Soltam 155 mm M-71 gun-howitzers were procured from Israel and entered service as the G4 howitzer.

The Canadian GC-45 was selected as the baseline howitzer from which to commence indigenous development. Armscor procured barrels, 30,000 rounds and design specifications for the GC-45 from Gerald Bull. One of the GC-45 test pieces was mounted on a US 155 mm M59 carriage – and a further six GC-45s had changes made to internal ballistics, barrel construction and carriage and cradle fixtures, to become the prototype models eventually leading to the G5. These GC-45s had been developed by SRC International of Belgium, a joint venture between Gerald Bull's Space Research Corporation of Canada and PRB of Belgium. Further changes included the addition of a small APU to allow the gun to dig itself in and move short distances at up to 16 kilometres per hour (9.9 mph), as well as the addition of an advanced muzzle brake. The G5 became operational in 1983.

Using the normal Extended Range, Full Bore (ERFB) ammunition the normal range is 30 kilometres (19 mi), which can be extended to about 40 kilometres (25 mi) using base bleed shells, or 50 kilometres (31 mi) using rocket-assisted V-LAP rounds. In 2002 Denel produced the G5-2000 version, with much greater range and accuracy than the earlier 45-calibre version.

The G5 gun has been placed on an OMC 6×6 chassis to produce the fully self-propelled G6 howitzer, and won major export sales in this form from the United Arab Emirates and Oman. In response to a request from India it has also been tested on the back of a TATRA 8×8 wheeled truck, a combination known as the T5-2000. It has also been fitted into a turret, named the T6, that can be placed on any suitable vehicle; it has been fitted on the T-72 tank.

== Operational history ==
The G5 howitzer saw action in Angola and Namibia in the South African Border War between 1986 and 1989, where it was in service with the South African Defence Force. The G5 was used operationally for the first time during Operation Alpha Centauri in 1986. The G5 also saw action in the Iran–Iraq War between 1980 and 1988, where it was used by Iraq.

== Variants ==
- G5 Mk I
- G5 Mk II
- G5 Mk III
- G5 Mk IIIA
- G5-2000: 52-calibre gun

== Operators ==
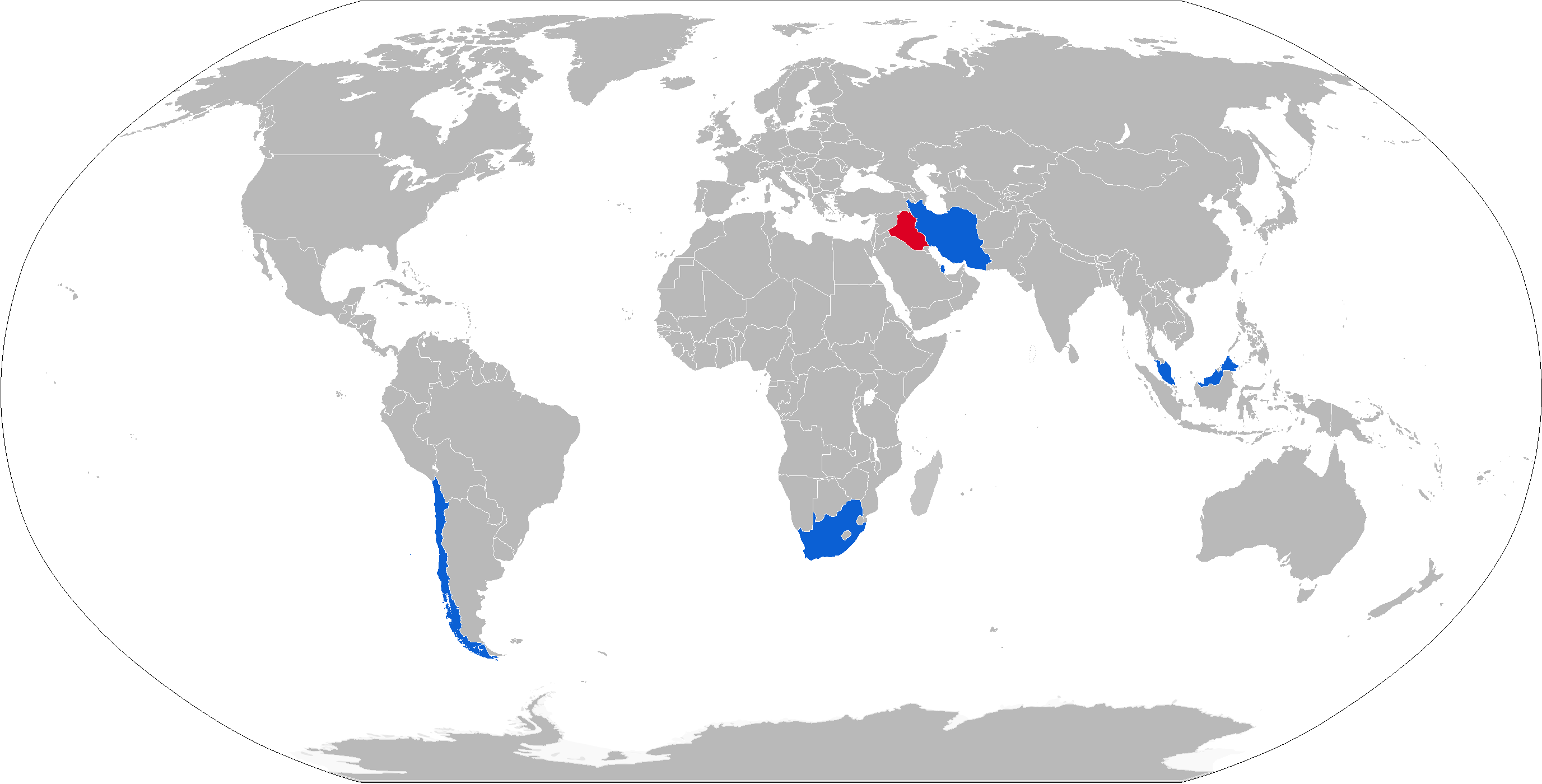
Map with Denel G5 howitzer operators in blue and former operators in red

=== Current operators ===
- Libya: 6 (probably donated by the United Arab Emirates to the Libyan National Army).
- Malaysia: 28 in service.
- South Africa: 72 in service.

=== Former operators ===
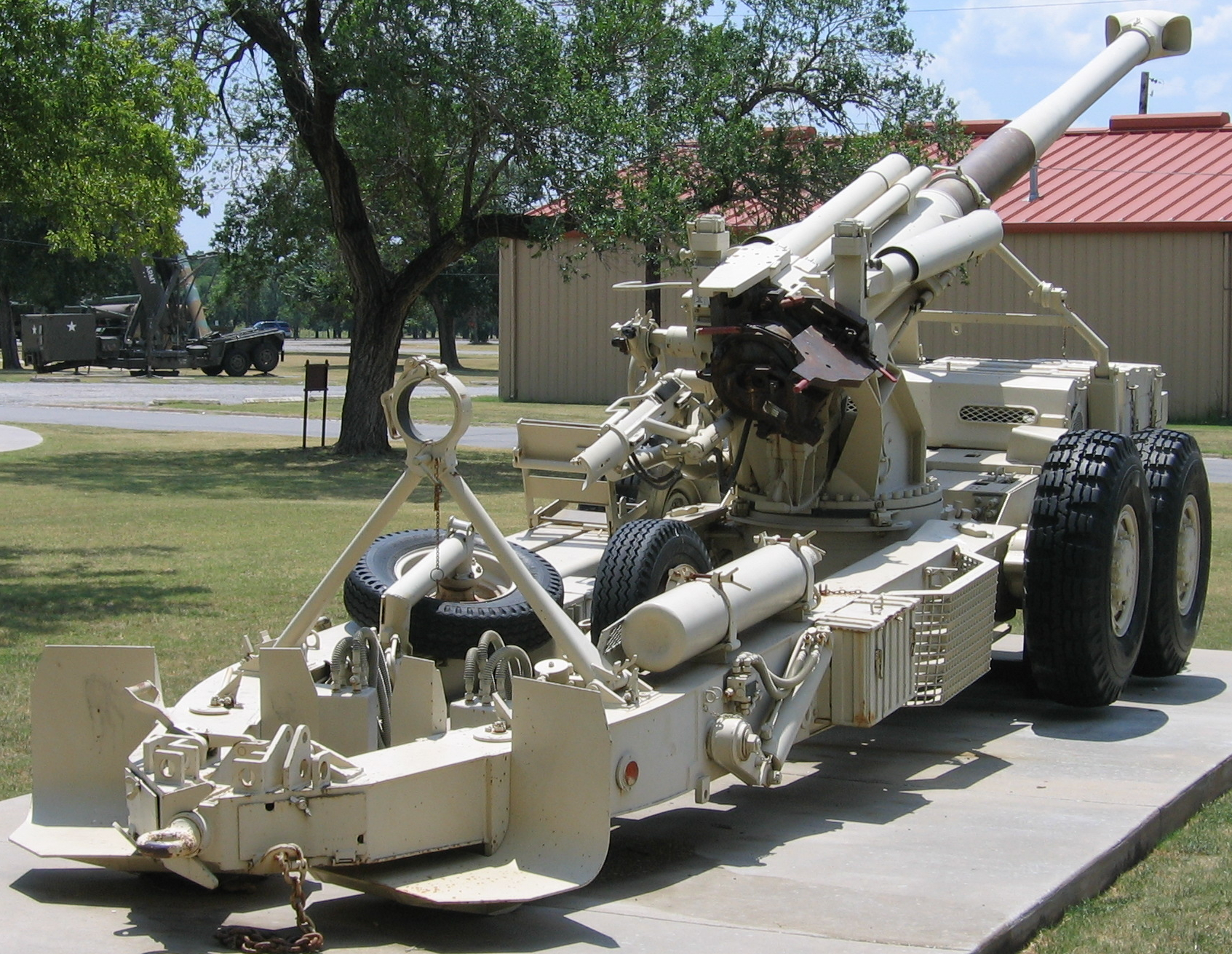
An ex-Iraqi G-5 on display at the US Army Field Artillery Museum, Ft. Sill, Oklahoma.

- Ba'athist Iraq: 100 G5s were operated, but these have probably all been destroyed or abandoned since the 2003 invasion of Iraq.
- Qatar: 12
- United Arab Emirates: 6 (donated to Libya).

== See also ==
- GC-45 howitzer
- G4 howitzer
- G6 howitzer
