= Liezen =

Liezen Liezn
- Municipality
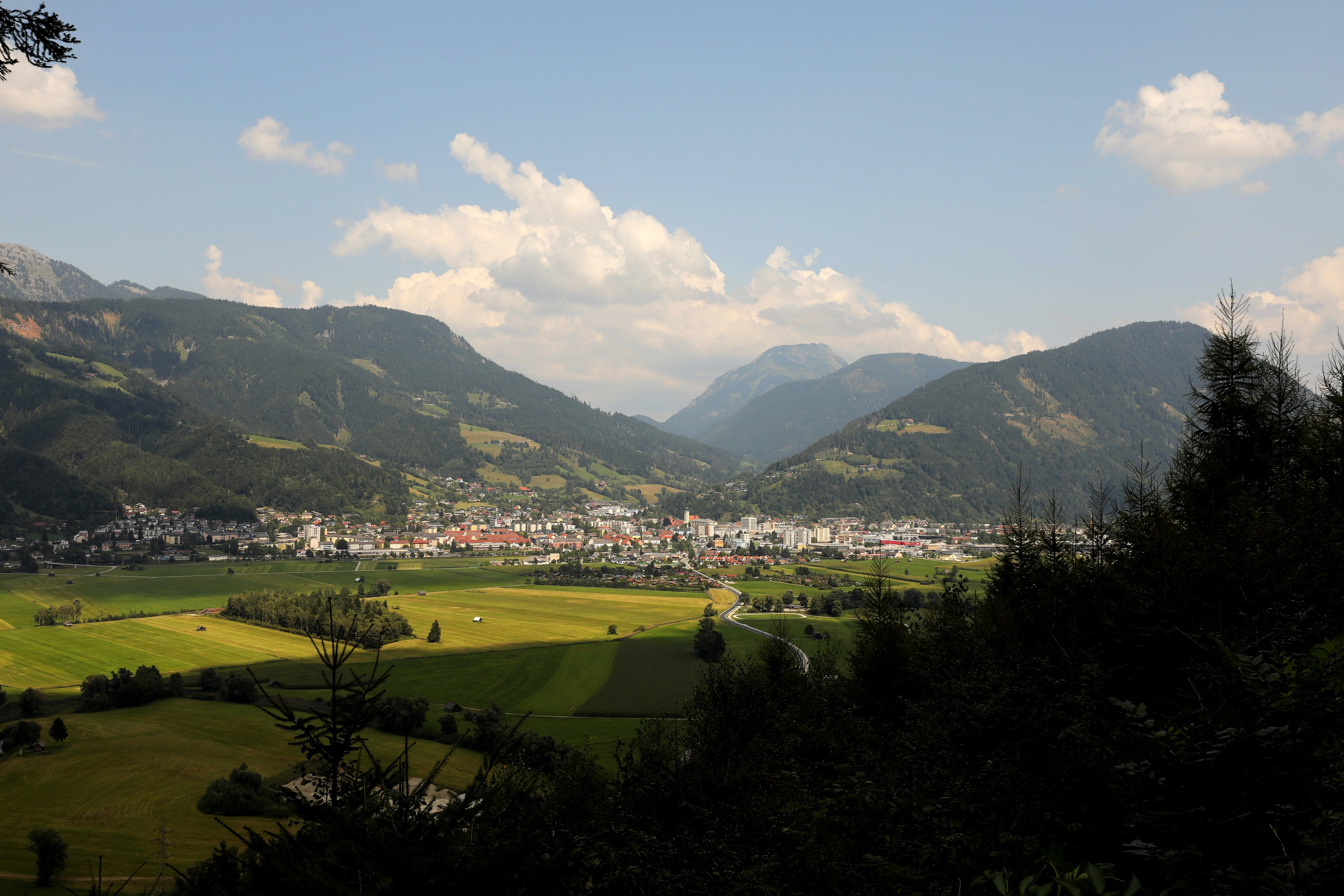
- View of Liezen

- Coat of arms

- Location within Austria
- Coordinates: 47°34′00″N 14°14′00″E
- Country: Austria
- State: Styria
- District: Liezen

Government
  - Mayor: Andrea Heinrich (SPÖ)

Area
  - Total: 92.11 km^{2} (35.56 sq mi)
- Elevation: 664 m (2,178 ft)

Population (2018-01-01)
  - Total: 8,191
  - Density: 88.93/km^{2} (230.3/sq mi)
- Time zone: UTC+1 (CET)
  - Summer (DST): UTC+2 (CEST)
- Postal code: 8940
- Area code: 03612
- Vehicle registration: LI
- Website: www.liezen.at

Liezen (German: [ˈliːt͡sn̩]; Central Bavarian: Liezn; local dialect pronunciation [-ɪə-]) is a municipality in the Austrian state of Styria, district capital of the district of the same name and economic center on the River Enns.

== Population ==
Historical population
Year	Pop.	±%
1869	1,944	—
1880	2,260	+16.3%
1890	2,220	−1.8%
1900	2,143	−3.5%
1910	2,224	+3.8%
1923	2,218	−0.3%
1934	2,417	+9.0%
1939	2,868	+18.7%
1951	4,802	+67.4%
1961	5,444	+13.4%
1971	6,402	+17.6%
1981	7,034	+9.9%
1991	7,051	+0.2%
2001	6,908	−2.0%
2011	6,839	−1.0%

== Politics ==
Since 1995, the left-wing SPÖ party has held an absolute majority in the local council. As of the 2015 local elections, the SPÖ holds 13 out of 25 seats on the council, the ÖVP has 6, the FPÖ has 3, a local party known as Die LIEB has 2, and Die Grünen has 1.

== Economy ==
A large mechanical engineering plant, Maschinenfabrik Liezen und Gießerei, is located in the east of the town; it was connected to the "Noricum scandal" in the 1980s due to the illegal export of armaments. As of 2012, the company remained a large employer.

== Popular culture ==
In the adventure novel series by Gérard de Villiers, Schloss Liezen is the home of the principal character Prince Malko Linge. However, this fictional castle is situated on the Austria-Hungary border, with most of its estates over the border in Hungary.
