= Highwater, Quebec =

Village in Quebec, Canada

Coordinates: 45°01′31″N 72°25′50″W

Highwater is a village in the Potton township of the Eastern Townships of Quebec, Canada, in Memphrémagog Regional County Municipality of the Estrie region, north of the Canada–United States border from North Troy, Vermont. The Portland-Montreal Pipe Line crosses the border and there is pumping station on the Highwater side. Highwater was the site of the Space Research Corporation test site. The confluence of the North Branch and the South Branch of the Missisquoi River is in Highwater; this forms the Missisquoi River which flows into Lake Champlain at Missisquoi Bay. The Newport Subdivision of the Central Maine and Quebec Railway railroad route from Newport, Vermont, to Richford, Vermont, traverses Highwater and follows the Mississquoi River. The single runway Mansonville Airport (CSK4) is located on chemin de l'Aeroport.
