= Space Research Corporation =

Defense company

- Founder: Gerald Bull
- Headquarters: Highwater, Quebec, Canada; Jay, Vermont, United States

Space Research Corporation was a corporation founded by Gerald Bull, after the budget for his research at Project HARP for the United States and Canadian federal governments was cut in 1967, in order to commercialize the technology of long-range artillery. Project HARP's assets were then given to the newly formed SRC.

SRC also focused on a range of artillery systems. Following the supply of arms to South Africa in 1977 in contravention of the UN embargo on the apartheid regime, Bull was jailed and the SRC was liquidated.

The main facility of SRC was 6,000 acres (2,400 ha), straddling the Canada–United States border between Highwater, Quebec, and Jay, Vermont. Affiliated companies included: SRCQ (SRC Quebec); Shefford Electronics Corp (SEC of Granby, Quebec); SRCI; Paragon; PRB (Belgian corporation); and SRCB (SRC Belgium).

== Background ==
In the mid-1950s, Bull was working on Anti-Ballistic Missile (ABM) and Intercontinental Ballistic Missile (ICBM) research at the Canadian Armaments and Research Development Establishment (CARDE) when he formulated the idea to launch satellites into orbit using an enormous cannon, which could be significantly more cost-effective at sending objects into space than a conventional rocket. These experiments soon caught the attention of the U.S. Army's Ballistic Research Laboratory who would later support his projects. In 1961, Bull resigned from CARDE and McGill University hired him as a professor. Working together with Donald Mordell, the university's Dean of Engineering, Bull moved forward with his space gun project and requested funding from various sources. In October 1961, Bull met with Charles Murphy, the head of the Ballistic Research Laboratory, to pitch his project for a supergun and was met with overwhelming support. The U.S. Army provided Bull with substantial financial backing and two 16-inch naval gun barrels complete with a land mount and surplus powder charges, a heavy-duty crane, and a $750,000 radar tracking system. Bull and Mordell officially announced the HARP project as a program under McGill University's Space Research Institute at a press conference in March 1962. In 1965, McGill University sponsored the Aeroballistic Laboratory (alternately the McGill Aeroballistic Test Center) at Highwater, Quebec with Bull as Director.

However, in November 1966, the Canadian government announced that it would pull all Project HARP funding after June 30, 1967. Despite Bull's attempts to resuscitate the program, the Canadian government and U.S. Army withdrew their support in 1967, leading to the program's complete termination. Gerald Bull created the Space Research Corporation to salvage his project and Project HARP's assets were given to the newly formed SRC. He established an aerospace science program at Norwich University in Northfield, Vt., in the late 1960s.

== Artillery exports ==
During the next decade, SRC worked for a number of governments including the People's Republic of China, Chile, Taiwan, and especially South Africa, and SRC contracted with the South African company Armscor. SRC's main product was a modification of the NATO- and U.S.-standard 155.4 mm (6") artillery cannon, the GC-45 howitzer ("GC" stood for "Gun, Canada", 45 for 45-calibre long), firing either NATO-standard 155 mm M107 rounds, or, more typically, a new shell of Bull's own design.

The new "pointy" shell, designated ERFB (for extended range full bore), offered considerably better aerodynamics than the original; its spin was moderated by fins on the shell rather than only by rifling in the barrel, and the round was supported in the gun barrel by four aerodynamic nubs allowing the middle of the shell to be elongated and thus reduce drag. The shell was initially spun in the same way as conventional artillery rounds with a driving band towards the base. The result was a gun that could out-range the original by as much as 30%, while at the same time being much more accurate. Standard NATO and US artillery of the time had a range of less than 25 kilometres (16 mi) while the GC-45, ERFB combination had a range of 29 kilometres (18 mi). With the innovative base-bleed system developed in Sweden this range could be increased to 39 kilometres (24 mi) without loss of accuracy.

== South African connection ==
The GC-45 work was paid for by the South Africans, but it has been claimed that Bull did the work largely at the urging of the United States Central Intelligence Agency (CIA) who considered South Africa as a defence against Soviet operations in Angola. Used in South Africa as the G5 howitzer, the new guns were used near the Angolan border in 1986 when South Africa invaded the former Portuguese colony of Angola, in order to assist UNITA. Because the Marxist government of Angola was aided by Cuban troops and Soviet artillery, it was also suggested that the CIA had encouraged the South Africans to invade the country in 1975 at the beginning of the Angolan Civil War.

== Arms embargo ==
Although the 1977 United Nations mandatory arms embargo prohibited the export of arms to South Africa, Bull's SRC supplied the apartheid regime with gun barrels and 30,000 shells, worth more than $30 million. Due to the ANC support by the Soviet Union, the CIA were said to have encouraged the deal and the shipment on the MV Tugelaland was with the co-operation of Israeli Military Industries. U.S. Customs initially considered prosecuting as many as 15 people involved but decided to indict just Bull and his partner, Rogers Gregory. Bull pleaded guilty, expecting a fine, but was angered when during 1980 he was imprisoned for four months. The effect of his guilty plea meant that the court did not hear any evidence of the suspected U.S. government collusion concerning these arms exports to South Africa. As a result of the arms embargo violation, however, SRC was liquidated.

The company was subsequently re-incorporated in Brussels where Bull managed it for several years. He was murdered during 1990, it is commonly conjectured by MOSSAD.

== Gun development ==
After the Canadian site was abandoned, a cannon was found there measuring 172 feet (52 m) in length, surmised to be the longest in the world.
