= Gerald Bull =

Canadian artillery engineer and entrepreneur (1928–1990)

- Born: Gerald Vincent Bull; March 9, 1928; North Bay, Ontario, Canada
- Died: March 22, 1990 (aged 62); Uccle, Brussels, Belgium
- Cause of death: Murder by shooting
- Education: University of Toronto
- Known for: Weapons development Project HARP; Project Babylon
- Spouse: Noemi "Mimi" Gilbert (m. 1954)
- Children: 7
- Scientific career
- Fields: Ballistics
- Workplaces: McGill University; Canadian Armament and Research Development Establishment; Space Research Corporation
- Thesis: (1951)
- Doctoral advisor: Gordon Patterson

Gerald Vincent Bull (March 9, 1928 – March 22, 1990) was a Canadian engineer who developed long-range artillery. Bull moved from project to project in his quest to economically launch a satellite using a huge artillery piece, to which end he designed the Project Babylon "supergun" for Saddam Hussein's government in Iraq.

On March 22, 1990, he was shot dead outside his apartment in Brussels, Belgium. His assassination is alleged to be the work of Israel's Mossad over his work for the Iraqi government. No person has ever been charged with his murder.

== Early life ==
Gerald Vincent Bull was born on March 9, 1928 in North Bay, Ontario, Canada. He is the son of George L. Toussaint Bull, a solicitor, and Gertrude Isabelle (née LaBrosse) Bull. George Bull was from a family from the Trenton area and had moved to North Bay in 1903 to start a law firm. As a Roman Catholic, LaBrosse would have been forbidden from marrying Bull, an Anglican. George converted to Roman Catholicism on February 20, 1909, and the couple married three days later. They would go on to have 10 children.

George Bull was offered the position of King's Counsel in 1928. The family was well off, but the Wall Street crash of 1929 and ensuing Great Depression dramatically changed their circumstances. Within a year the loans Bull had taken to buy stocks on margin were called in, and the family was forced to move to Toronto to look for work.

The next year Gertrude Bull suffered complications while giving birth to her 10th child, Gordon. She died April 1, 1931. George Bull suffered a nervous breakdown and fell into heavy drinking; he left his children in the care of his sister Laura, who fell victim to cancer and died in mid-1934. The next year, banks foreclosed on the family home. The same year, George, at the age of 58, met and married Rose Bleeker. He gave up the children to various relatives: Gerald ending up living with his older sister Bernice.

In 1938, Gerald was sent to spend the summer holidays with his uncle and aunt, Philip and Edith LaBrosse (Philip was the younger brother of Gerald's mother, Gertrude). During the Depression, Phil and Edith had won about $175,000 in the Irish Sweepstakes, and were relatively well off. Gerald was sent to an all-boys Jesuit school, Regiopolis College, Kingston, Ontario. Although too young to attend, the school allowed him to start in 1938 and he returned to spend the summers with the LaBrosses. During this time he took up the hobby of building balsa wood airplanes of his own design, and was a member of the school's modelling club. He graduated in 1944.

== University ==
After graduating, Bull entered Queen's University, with hopes of eventually entering military officers' training school. Philip LaBrosse visited the University of Toronto (U of T) with the intention of having Bull placed there. He wrote to Bull, who was in Kingston, having found room in the medical school. Bull declined the offer and instead asked LaBrosse if a position in the new aeronautical engineering course was available. The department, being brand new, had limited qualifying criteria for entrance and agreed to interview Bull even though he was only sixteen years old – and he was accepted into the undergraduate program. Records and recollections of both classmates and his professors show little evidence of Bull's brilliance; one professor noted that "He certainly didn't stand out". After graduating in 1948, with marks that were described as "strictly average", Bull took a drafting job at A.V. Roe Canada.

Later that year, the University of Toronto opened a new Institute of Aerodynamics (now the Institute for Aerospace Studies) under the direction of Dr. Gordon Patterson. The Institute could afford to employ twelve students, accepting three per year for a four-year period, and was funded by the Defence Research Board (DRB). Bull applied and was accepted at Patterson's personal recommendation, as Patterson felt that any lack in academics was made up for by Bull's tremendous energy. Bull was soon assigned to work with fellow student Doug Henshaw, and the two were given the task of building a supersonic wind tunnel, which was at that time a relatively rare device.

When the Royal Canadian Air Force donated land adjacent to RCAF Station Downsview to the institute, the operations were quickly moved. During construction, Bull used the wind tunnel as the basis for his September 15, 1949 Master's thesis, on the design and construction of advanced wind tunnels. The tunnel was to be featured prominently during the opening of the new Institute grounds, leading to an all-night rush to get it fully operational in time for the presentation. The work was completed at 3:30 am, but the team was too exhausted to test it. The next day Air Marshal Wilfred Curtis pushed the start button and nothing happened, but Dr. Patterson quickly reached around, pushed harder, and the wind tunnel worked perfectly.

Bull had largely finished his PhD thesis on the same topic in 1950, when a request from the DRB asking that the Institute provide an aerodynamicist to help on their Velvet Glove Missile project arrived. It was to be an unpaid position on which the volunteer would remain on a normal PhD stipend from the university. Patterson selected Bull for the position, which led to a period of successful work at the Canadian Armament and Research Development Establishment, or CARDE.

== Career ==
=== Canada ===
The Canadian Armament and Research Development Establishment (CARDE) was formed as a joint Canadian-British operation to study artillery and ballistics, in an effort to harness the intellectual resources of Canada, as well as to place developing British technology outside of German reach during World War II. Formed up on a military training area and artillery range outside Valcartier, northwest of Quebec City, CARDE was one of a number of research divisions of the DRB that were well funded in the immediate post-war era. CARDE was researching supersonic flight and a variety of rocket and missile projects when Bull was asked to join. Bull asked to build a wind tunnel for this research, but his suggestions were dismissed as too expensive.

Gunners at CARDE suggested that firing models out of existing gun barrels would permit gathering data at much lower cost, and guided Bull in this direction. As a proof of concept, they tried an Ordnance QF 17-pounder barrel bored to 3.9 inches (99 mm). The aerodynamicists' demands to accommodate larger models resulted in boring out a BL 5.5 inch Medium Gun barrel to produce a 5.9 inches (150 mm) smooth-bore. Borrowing an idea developed in England in 1916, cards were placed on holders along the range and scaled models of the missile fired through them. The models were carried in a segmented aluminum sabot, which peeled away as the round left the muzzle.

As originally built the range was 1,000 yards (910 m) long, with "jump cards" located at 100 yards (91 m) intervals. A metallic coating on the cards permitted timing of flight progress to measure velocity. One station was equipped for Schlieren photography to record the shock waves and wake around the projectile. In some ways this technique was superior to wind tunnel study, as it allowed for the direct measurement of real-world influences on the trajectory, as a test of theoretical calculations. On the downside, reducing the collected data to a mathematical trajectory for checking against the theoretical calculations is difficult.

Bull was at CARDE briefly before returning to the university to defend his thesis in March 1951, at 23 years old becoming the youngest PhD graduate in the institute's history—a record that remains to this day. He returned to CARDE, now on the DRB's payroll, and continued working on the instrumented guns. On one of these trips, in 1953, he and a friend stopped in Charny after a fishing trip to drop off some of their catch at a local doctor's house. Bull met Noemi "Mimi" Gilbert, the doctor's daughter, and the two soon started dating. Given Bull's work schedule they were rarely able to see each other, but they became engaged in February 1954, and married on July 15. Gilbert gave the couple a small house as a wedding gift. Mimi gave birth to their first son, Phillippe, on July 3, 1955, and a second, Michel, in November 1956.

In 1954 Bull decided that a wind tunnel was too important to ignore, even if he could not arrange for funding through the DRB. Instead, he gained the ear of professors at Laval University in Quebec City, and Bull and a number of graduate students started work on a tunnel similar to the one he had earlier built at U of T. It opened in the summer of 1955 and was capable of speeds up to Mach 4, but cost only $6,000, the result of using scrap for most of its parts.

Bull's work was brought to the public's attention in a May 20, 1955 Toronto Telegram headline article, Unveil Canadian Gun that Fires 4,550 M.P.H. Missiles. Around this time Bull further improved the data-collection capabilities of the system by developing a telemetry system that could fit in the models. DRB staff thought the idea was unworkable and worked against having it funded, but Bull shuffled his own department's funding and went ahead and developed it anyway. All the parts of Bull's future efforts, smooth-bore high-velocity guns, sabots for increasing performance, and hardened electronics, were now complete.

Work on the Velvet Glove ended in 1956, and the DRB turned its attention to anti-ballistic missiles (ABMs). Bull's gun system was not fast enough to be useful in this role, so it was adapted to use a "sabot" to improve its performance. Bull then moved on to hypersonics research and the study of infrared and radar cross sections for detection. As the UK's research efforts wound down in the post-war political environment, CARDE's joint UK-Canadian funding was dramatically cut back, with the project eventually being handed over to the Canadians entirely and followed by further cuts. Bull was vocal about this turn of events, calling the Liberal government of the day "second-rate lawyers and jumped-up real-estate salesmen".

During this period CARDE was visited by a US team, including Lieutenant General Arthur Trudeau, who was impressed with Bull's work. Trudeau was director of US Army Research and Development, and he quickly set up a similar effort at the Aberdeen Proving Ground under the direction of Dr. Charles Murphy. They built an analog of Bull's gun using a 5-inch (130 mm) gun and started test firing it over the Atlantic in 1961. The team used a fire-control radar from a Nike Hercules missile battery to track the shells, which released a cloud of chaff at altitudes up to 130,000 feet (40,000 m).

Around the same time, Bull and Murphy started discussing the idea of firing scale aircraft models from their guns. Both started working on the idea, but Bull beat Murphy when he successfully fired a model of the Gloster Javelin from his gun and managed to take shadowgraph photos of it showing supersonic shock cones. Bull then used the same method to work on the Avro Arrow, discovering an instability that led to the use of a stability augmentation system. Work on the Avro Arrow was soon cancelled, which angered Bull.

With attention turning to space after the launch of Sputnik in 1957, Bull leaked a story that Canada would soon match this feat by placing a high-velocity gun in the nose of a US Army Redstone missile. The story was a complete fabrication, but caused a major stir when it hit the papers on April 22, 1958. After the story broke Prime Minister John Diefenbaker was besieged in the House of Commons press scrum, later dismissing it stating that "There is no foundation whatsoever to the story, not a scintilla of truth to it".

A major flap broke out as a result, leading to the dressing down of several of Bull's superiors. When the press was invited to visit CARDE, the Canadian Broadcasting Company broadcast a piece covering much of the work at CARDE on May 11, including lengthy sections on Bull's gun and their work on infrared detection and anti-ballistic missile systems.

On April 1, 1961, Bull got into an argument with his direct superior over paperwork. Bull wrote out his resignation. A report prepared after his departure stated "... his tempestuous nature and strong dislike for administration and red tape constantly led him into trouble with senior management."

=== High Altitude Research Project ===
Bull had long prepared for this event, and soon re-appeared as a professor at McGill University, which was in the process of building up a large engineering department under the direction of Donald Mordell. Mordell had long maintained links with CARDE and became one of Bull's ardent supporters, in spite of what other professors saw as "second-rate attempts at manipulation" and that "[Mordell] always supported Bull's work ... I think sometimes he got pretty tired of supporting Bull." Bull, for his part, appeared to enjoy the new position, and later described it as "a marriage made in heaven". Bull remained in contact with his counterparts in the US and the University of Toronto, and set about equipping the university with the instrumentation it would need to be a leader in the field of aerodynamics.

Several years earlier, while still working at CARDE, Gerald and Mimi had purchased a 2,000-acre (8.1 km^{2}) plot of land on the Québec–Vermont border. Bull donated the land to be used by McGill and turned into a new ballistics lab, a private analog of the CARDE site. Renamed to become "Highwater Station" due to the local village of Highwater, Quebec, the site was quickly developed under the direction of former British Army colonel Robert Stacy, who bulldozed large sections, built various test facilities and ran power to the site. There they began working with 5 in (127 mm) and 7 in (178 mm) artillery pieces.

In late 1961 Bull visited Murphy and Trudeau at Aberdeen and was able to interest them in the idea of using guns to loft missile components for re-entry research, a task that was otherwise very expensive and time-consuming aboard rockets. They arranged funding for the work under Project HARP (for High Altitude Research Project, not to be confused with HAARP). The US Navy supplied a surplus 16-inch (406 mm) battleship gun, and a contract from the Office of Naval Research paid for the gun to be re-bored into a 16.4-inch (417 mm) smooth bore. The entire contract, excluding shipping, was only $2,000.

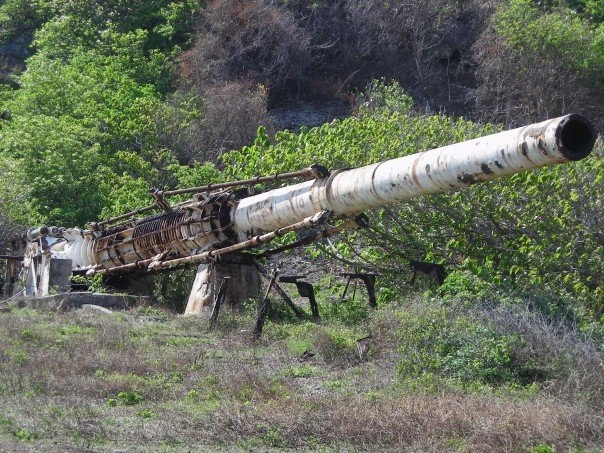
The remains of the abandoned gun from Project HARP in Barbados.

The performance of the gun was so great that the Highwater site was too small to support it. McGill had long been running a meteorological station on Barbados and had close connections with the new Democratic Labour Party (DLP), and suggested that it would make an ideal location for the gun to be set up. Bull met with then Premier Errol Barrow who became Barbados' first Prime Minister after Barbados received its independence from the UK in 1966. Barrow, an enthusiastic supporter of HARP, arranged for a firing site at Paragon, on the southeast coast of the island near the Seawell Airport. The guns arrived in early 1962 but could not be put ashore at the site, and had to be offloaded 7 miles (11 km) up the coast at Foul Bay, and then transported overland via a purpose-built railway that employed hundreds of locals. As the project continued, this figure grew to over 300 permanently employed with the project, and it became a major reason for Barrow's continued support. Bull encouraged the locals to use the project as a stepping-stone to a science or engineering degree of their own, and his efforts were widely lauded in the press.

In January 1962 the first test shot was carried out, firing an empty sabot. The test was completely successful, so a further two similar firings were abandoned and the second firing was made with a dart-like finned projectile named Martlet (after the mythical bird without feet on the McGill University crest). These tests demonstrated several problems, including poor shot-to-shot performance of the decades-old gunpowder, and the fact that the projectile left the barrel so quickly that the powder did not have time to burn completely. New charges using modern powder were soon supplied, and by November 1962 the 150-kilogram Martlets were being fired at over 10,000 ft/s (3,048 m/s; 6,818 mph) and reaching altitudes of 215,000 ft (66,000 m).

The Martlets evolved through this period, growing in size and sophistication. As Bull later put it:

Martlett 2A was the first high-altitude projectile. It weighed 225 pounds. The forebody carried electronics, the aftbody carried chemical payloads. It was five inches (127 mm) in diameter, and had a very heavy pusher plate. The actual all-up weight was around 400 to 450 pounds. Then what happened was the Martlet 2C. [It] was the big workhorse, still a five inch (127 mm). Then, towards the end, we came up with the 350 pound vehicle, the same thing, only seven inches in diameter.

The idea was to find out what happens in the atmosphere from sunset to sunrise. Remember, nobody gave us grants. We had to produce tropical atmospheric meteorological [data] for the army research office, that's how we got our money. We were trying to measure everything to the top of the atmosphere, which we labeled as a nominal two hundred kilometers.

The cost of a launch was about $5,000. We did up to eight a night. We used to do three nights in a row to try to get the data.

— Gerald Bull

The Martlet's electronics triggered the release of the chemical markers at a set altitude. This left a sort of "smoke trail" through the atmosphere that could be used to measure winds aloft by visual means. The chemical was typically triethylaluminium, which burns on contact with air. Loading the shells was a dangerous job that required special handling. The Martlets were also used to release chaff instead of chemicals, allowing tracking via radar. Some shots used additional electronics to measure the magnetic field. Similar firings in support of the upper atmosphere research were made using 5" and 7" guns at Highwater, Alaska, and Wallops Island, Virginia.

By the time the program ran down, about 1,000 firings had taken place, and the data collected during HARP represents half of all the upper-atmospheric data collected (as of 1991).

The Martlet-2 was only a stepping-stone on the way to Bull's real interest, a gun-launched rocket that could reach outer space. The gun had been thoroughly tested and was well past intercontinental ranges, but needed modifying. In early 1963 HARP started experimenting with the Martlet-3, a 7-inch-diameter (177.8 mm) "full bore" projectile designed to test the basic problems of launching a solid-fuel artillery shell from guns. Solid shell fuel has the consistency of soft rubber and is cut into a pattern that is open in the middle, so on firing the "grain" would tend to collapse into the cavity. This problem was solved by filling the cavity with zinc bromide, which prevented the collapse and was drained after firing to allow the rocket to light. Test firings began at the US Ballistic Research Laboratory (now part of the U.S. Army Research Laboratory) in Aberdeen using a bored-out 175 mm gun from the M107. This program proved the basic concept and shots of the Martlet-3 reached altitudes of 155 miles (249 km).

The ultimate goal of the program was the Martlet-4, a three-stage 16.4" rocket that would be fired from a lengthened gun at Barbados and would reach orbit. In 1964 Donald Mordell was able to convince the Canadian government of the value of the HARP project as a low-cost method for Canada to enter the space-launch business, and arranged a joint Canadian-US funding program of $3 million a year for three years, with the Canadians supplying $2.5 million of that. Another 16.4" gun, mounted horizontally, was being tested at the Highwater range, and was extended by cutting the breech off the end of one gun and welding it to the end of another to produce a new gun over 110 feet long. The extension allowed the powder to be contained for a longer period of time, slowing down the acceleration and loads on the airframe, while also offering higher overall performance. Once the system had been tested at Highwater, a second barrel was shipped to Foul Bay, attached and strengthened with external bracing to allow it to be raised from the horizontal. This gun was extensively tested in 1965 and 1966.

The orbital project faced a constant race with its own budget. Originally guaranteed three years of funding, the money was handled by the DRB, who was less than impressed with its former "star" going on to greater things while their own funding was being dramatically cut. Although the money was allocated for 1964, the DRB managed to delay delivery for ten months, forcing McGill to cover salaries in the interim. These problems did not go unnoticed in the US Army, and in order to ensure that firings would not be interrupted by problems on the Canadian side, a third double-length gun was built at the Yuma Proving Grounds to continue the high-altitude measurements. On November 18, 1966, this gun launched a Martlet-2 to 180 km, a world record that still stands today.

By 1967 it was becoming clear that the Martlet-4 would not be ready by the time the funding ran out in 1968. An effort started to build a simplified version, the GLO-1A (Gun-launched Orbiter, Version 1A), based on the Martlet-2G. Continued budget pressures, changing public attitudes towards military affairs, negative reviews from the press and other researchers in Canada and a change of government all conspired to ensure that Canadian funding was not renewed in 1967. Bull had been working on a last-ditch effort to launch a Canadian flag into orbit in time for the Canadian Centennial, but nothing came of this plan.

=== Space Research Corporation ===
Bull returned to his Highwater range, and transferred HARP's assets to a new company. He invoked a clause in the original contract with McGill that required them to return the range to its original natural condition. Faced with hundreds of thousands of dollars in construction costs to wind down a project that could not garner funding, McGill was left with little choice but to trade Bull for title to the Highwater equipment. Setting up a new company, Space Research Corporation (SRC), Bull became an international artillery consultant. Incorporated in both Quebec and Vermont, a number of contracts from both the Canadian and US military research arms helped the company get started. In the late 1960s, Bull established a space program at Norwich University, in Northfield, Vermont.

At SRC Bull continued the development of his high-velocity artillery, adapting the HARP smoothbore into a new "reverse rifled" design where the lands of a conventional rifling were replaced by grooves cut into the barrel to make a slightly larger gun also capable of firing existing ammunition. Normally artillery shells are sealed into the rifling by a driving band of soft metal like copper, which demands that the shell be shaped so that it balances at its widest point, where the band is located. This is not ideal for ballistics, especially supersonically where a higher fineness ratio is desirable. Bull solved this problem by using an additional set of nub "fins" near the front of the shell to keep it centered in the barrel, allowing the driving band to be greatly reduced in size, and located wherever was convenient. Re-shaping the shell for better supersonic performance provided dramatically improved range and accuracy, up to double in both cases, when compared to a similar gun using older-style ammunition. He called the new shell design "Extended Range, Full Bore" (ERFB).

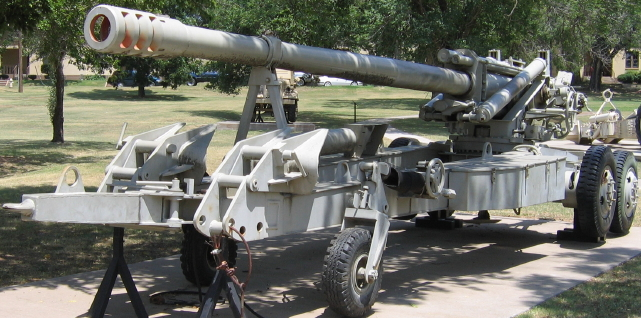
The GC-45 howitzer as designed and manufactured by Space Research Corporation

Starting in 1975, Bull designed a new gun based on the common US 155/39 M109 howitzer, extending it slightly to 45 calibre through modifications that could be applied to existing weapons, calling the resulting weapon the GC-45 howitzer. Bull also purchased the base bleed technology being developed in Sweden, which allowed for further improvements in range. The gun offered ranges far in excess of even the longest-ranged heavy artillery in a gun only slightly larger than common medium-weight guns.

SRC's first major sales success was the sale of 50,000 ERFB shells to Israel in 1973 for use in American-supplied artillery pieces. The Israelis had successfully used a number of 175 mm M107 guns in the counter-battery role against its Soviet counterpart, the 130 mm towed field gun M1954 (M-46), but the introduction of long range rockets fired from Lebanon outranged them. The ERFB shells extended the range of the already formidable M107 to as much as 50 kilometres (31 mi), allowing the guns to counter-battery even the longest range rockets.

Bull was rewarded for success of this program by a Congressional bill, sponsored by Senator Barry Goldwater (R-AZ) making him retroactively eligible for a decade of American citizenship and high-level American nuclear security clearance. He was granted citizenship by an Act of Congress.

=== Sanctions contravention ===
In 1977 and 1978, Bull orchestrated the illegal sale of 30,000 155 mm artillery shells, gun barrels and plans for the GC-45 howitzer as well as radar equipment to Armscor, the South African state arms corporation; with two shipments made through Antigua in 1978 and another through Spain in 1979. The South African Defence Force's arsenal of vintage howitzers, antiquated by the arms embargo, had been outperformed by BM-21 Grads during Operation Savannah in 1975. In order to counter the modern Soviet artillery deployed in neighbouring Angola, South African officials began seeking longer-ranged weapons systems and were referred to SRC. Armscor trialled the GC-45 with a new mounting to allow for increased powder loads and installed an auxiliary power unit for improving mobility in the field. The resulting G5 howitzer was vital to South African campaigns against Cuban expeditionary forces in Angola, allowing them to target infrastructure and personnel with phenomenal accuracy. In addition, the urgent shipments were also meant to address the acute shortage of artillery shells due to their incursion into Angola.

Once these shipments had been uncovered, Bull was arrested for illegal arms dealing in contravention of UN Security Council Resolution 418 for arms export to South Africa. Expecting a token punishment, Bull found himself spending six months in the Federal Correctional Complex, Allenwood, Pennsylvania in 1980. (Note: Bull and company president Rogers Gregory were sentenced to one year imprisonment of which six months was suspended. Space Research Corp US was also fined US$45,000. Charges related to the export of 30,000 155mm artillery shells, two gun barrels and a radar tracking system – all of which were in contravention of the UN Arms Embargo on South Africa. Fines were also raised for charges associated with false information being used on shipping and end-user documents. The charges and sentencing were based on guilty pleas by Bull, Gregory and SRC who threatened to implicate the CIA in their activities if the charges went before a grand jury leading to a public trial.) After his release, he was again charged (this time in Canadian courts) for transferring technology on 155mm extended range shell development to China without the necessary export permits and fined $55,000 for international arms dealing.

=== Support to Iraq ===
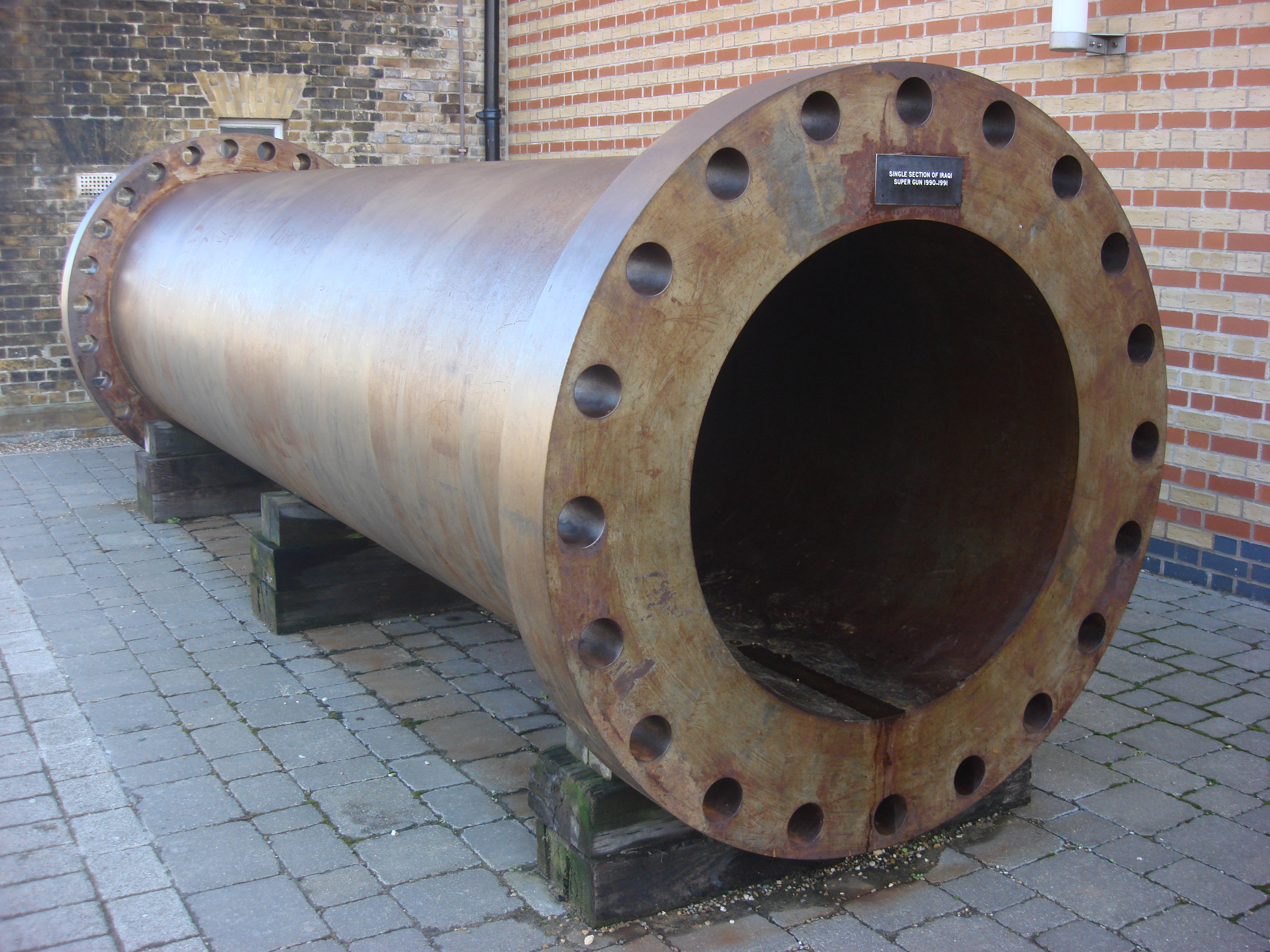
A section of the Iraqi supergun Big Babylon

Bull left Canada and moved to Brussels, where a subsidiary of SRC called European Poudreries Réunies de Belgique was based. Bull continued working with the ERFB ammunition design, developing a range of munitions that could be fired from existing weapons. A number of companies designed upgrades to work with older weapons, like the M114 155 mm howitzer, combining a new barrel from the M109 with Bull's ERFB ammunition to produce an improved weapon for relatively low cost.

Bull also continued working with the GC-45 design, and soon secured work with the People's Republic of China, and then Iraq. He designed two artillery pieces for the Iraqis: the 155 mm Al-Majnoonan, an updated version of the G5, and a similar set of adaptations applied to the 203 mm US M110 howitzer to produce the 210 mm Al-Fao with a maximum range of 56 km (35 mi) without base bleed. Although it appears the Al-Fao was not put into production, the Al-Majnoonan started replacing Soviet designs as quickly as they could be delivered. When deliveries could not be made quickly enough, additional barrels were ordered from South Africa. The guns were built and sold through an Austrian intermediary.

Based on his HARP results, Bull secured additional Iraqi funding and support for the construction of a smoothbore gun barrel assembly. He received a $25m down-payment for the project on condition that he continued the development work on the Al-Majnoonan and Al-Fao guns. Initially, a smaller 45-meter, 350 mm caliber gun (known as Baby-Babylon) was completed for testing purposes and then Bull started work on the "real" PC-2 machine, a gun that was 150 meters long, weighed 1,510 tonnes, with a bore of one meter (39 inches) that would allow the firing of multi-stage rocket-assisted shells with a range of over 5,000 mi (8,000 km) or to launch 1,200 lb (540 kg) satellites into orbit. The project objective was to eventually provide Iraq with three 350 mm Baby Babylon guns and two 1000 mm PC-2 Big Babylon guns.

The Iraqis then told Bull they would go ahead with the project only if he would also help with development of their longer-range Scud-based missile project. Bull agreed. Construction of the individual sections of the new gun started in England at Sheffield Forgemasters and Matrix Churchill as well as in Spain, the Netherlands, and Switzerland while he concurrently worked on the Scud project, making calculations for the new nose cone needed for the greater re-entry speeds and temperatures the missile would face.

== Death ==
Over a few months, his apartment suffered several non-robbery break-ins, apparently as a threat or a warning, but he continued to work on the project. On 22 March 1990, Bull was shot five times in the head and back at point-blank range while approaching the door of his apartment in Brussels. He was pronounced dead at the scene. The New York Times reported that when police arrived at the scene they found the key still in his door and his unopened briefcase containing nearly $20,000 in cash. Another account states he was shot by a three-man team when he answered the doorbell.

According to Iraqi intelligence, cooperation between Bull and Saddam Hussein was perceived as a threat by Israel, which had engaged in previous military engagements with Iraq during the Arab–Israeli war. Watching the development of the gun, Israel feared it could be used to launch nuclear weapons, but the redesigned Scud missiles were of greater concern at that moment.

=== Aftermath ===
According to investigative journalist Gordon Thomas, the assassination of Bull had been sanctioned by Israeli Prime Minister Yitzhak Shamir. Mossad director Nahum Admoni sent a three-man team to Brussels, where the agents shot Bull at his doorstep. Within hours of the killing, according to Thomas, Mossad was engaged in distributing false stories to the European media, alleging that Bull had been shot by agents from Iraq.

Although it was in the immediate interest of both Israel and Iran that Bull discontinue his cooperation with Saddam Hussein, he had worked for many different parties in many critical defence projects, and had become both an asset and a liability for several powerful groups simultaneously. Given Bull's past ventures, it has been speculated that besides Israel or Iran, the CIA; MI6; or the Chilean, Syrian, Iraqi, or South African government could have been behind his assassination.

=== Remaining equipment ===
Project Babylon was stopped when supergun parts were seized by Customs in the United Kingdom in March 1990 leading to most of Bull's staff returning to Canada. Some of the confiscated parts have survived after they were not needed as evidence (Note: They would normally have been sold for disposal resulting in them being cut up for scrap) and because customs were interested in the story, some of the barrel pipes were given to museums and to the Ministry of Defence. In Iraq, all remaining gun barrels and propellants were destroyed by UN inspectors after the Persian Gulf War in October 1991.

== See also ==
- Doomsday Gun, HBO movie about Bull
- List of assassinated persons
- List of unsolved murders (1980–1999)
- Science and technology in Canada
- The Fist of God, novel by Frederick Forsyth
- The Nature of the Beast, novel by Louise Penny
