= Maschinenfabrik Liezen und Gießerei =

Austrian foundry and mechanical engineering company

Coordinates: 47.5642°N 14.2512°E

- Type: GmbH.
- Industry: Mechanical engineering
- Predecessor: (1939-46) Schmidhütte Liezen, Schmid & Co. KG. (1946-53) Hütte Liezen Ges.m.b.H. (1954-63) Vereinigte Österreichische Eisen- und Stahlwerke AG, Werk Liezen (1964-72) VÖEST – Werk Liezen (1973-83) VOEST – Alpine AG – Werk Liezen (1987-89) Noricum Maschinenbau und Handel GmbH (1989-94) Maschinenfabrik Liezen Ges.m.b.H.
- Founded: 1994
- Headquarters: Liezen (Liezen District), Styria, Austria
- Products: Milling and sawing machines, mineral crushers
- Services: Metal engineering, casting
- Website: www.mfl.at

Maschinenfabrik Liezen und Gießerei GesmbH is a foundry and mechanical engineering company based in Liezen, Austria. The company's origins date to 1939 when a factory was established in Liezen for war materials production. Post WWII the company "Hütte Liezen" entered state control and became a subsidiary to VÖEST in the 1950s. During the 1980s the company was involved in the 'Noricom' arms scandal due to its production of heavy artillery which were illegally exported.

After independence from VOEST in the 1980s and bankruptcy in the 1990s the company was restarted as Maschinenfabrik Liezen und Gießerei Ges.m.b.H. in 1994. As of 2012 the company has extensive mechanical engineering facilities and foundry, and manufactures industrial milling and sawing machines. Several associate companies acquired after 1994 manufacture mineral processing equipment.

== History ==
=== Background – Hütte Liezen ===
Iron ore deposits close to Liezen had been known to exist since the 1200s; mining and smelting took place in the Liezen area till the end of the 19th century. In 1939, the family of industrialists Schmid-Schmidsfelden created a works in Liezen; this was for the war effort and was not intended to be a post-war commercial business. By 1944, 1100 people were working at the plant. In May 1945, the American Allied army had reached Liezen and the plant was closed. In 1945 the facilities included a steelworks and foundry building of over 10,000 m^{2} (110,000 sq ft) and another building of over 7,500 m^{2} (81,000 sq ft) with metal treatment (cleaning, annealing etc.) and mechanical engineering facilities, as well as various outbuildings, offices and power generation facilities.

The plant was nationalised in 1946, becoming Hütte Liezen GesmbH, with a workforce reduced to 350. By the 1950s, employment had risen to nearly 1000 workers; in 1953 due to a difficult economic environment the plant was transferred under lease to the care of VÖEST of Linz for 15 years - the plant's name became VÖEST-Liezen - production synergies between the two plants were optimised - with the Liezen works receiving steel from VÖEST's Linz plant. In 1963, the workforce was approximately 1300.

When VÖEST became VÖEST-Alpine in 1973, the factory became VÖEST-Alpine AG-Werk Liezen. Around that time, the plant's equipment was modernised at a cost of approximately Schilling 350 million.

Noricum Maschinenbau und Handel (1987–9)

In 1986 the company was renamed Noricum Maschinenbau und Handels-GmbH; During this period it became the centre of arms-export scandal - the Noricum Scandal; the plant had manufactured the GC-45 howitzer, which was then exported to Iraq and Iran via proxies (at the time of the Iran-Iraq war) - this was in violation of Austria's own arms treaties, and arms export treaties. It ultimately led to the trial and convictions of government officials and politicians for violations of Austria's neutrality act, in addition to others convicted of arms dealing.

=== Maschinenfabrik Liezen ===
In October 1989 the company became an independent entity as Maschinenfabrik Liezen AG, and was sold for the token sum of 1 Schilling to industrialist Emmerich Assmann. The Assmann group became bankrupt in 1993 and after a brief interim ownership by 1994 the Maschinenfabrik Liezen was itself insolvent and was eventually sold to the Haider Group.

=== Maschinenfabrik Liezen und Gießerei ===
After insolvency proceedings the company was restarted as Maschinenfabrik Liezen und Gießerei Ges.m.b.H. on 5 December 1994.

In 1996 the mineral processing company (grinding mills and components) Christian Pfeifer Maschinenfabrik was taken over.

In 2004 the company MFL Faserzementanlagen Ges.m.b.H. (Fibre cement manufacturing equipment manufacturer) was formed from the assets of VOITH-FCM; Maschinenfabrik Liezen and ICS - Automation of Switzerland are backers of the company.

In August 2011 the mineral processing (crushing/sorting etc.) company SBM Mineral Processing GmbH of Laakirchen was taken over by MFL's owner 'Group Haider' (Heinrich Obernhuber / Krünes Consulting GmbH.) becoming an associate company of the MFL group.

A rail milling and grinding joint venture Vossloh MFL Rail Milling GmbH, was formed in association with Vossloh AG in 2012.

== Products and services ==
The company manufactures machines for mineral processing including crushing and sorting equipment (in addition to products by associates 'Christian Pfeifer Maschinenfabrik' and 'SBM Mineral Processing'), industrial saws and milling machines, and cable stranding machines (through MFL group associate MALI GesmbH). . The foundry also produces iron and alloy castings.
