= 155 GH 52 APU =

Finnish 155 mm towed gun-howitzer

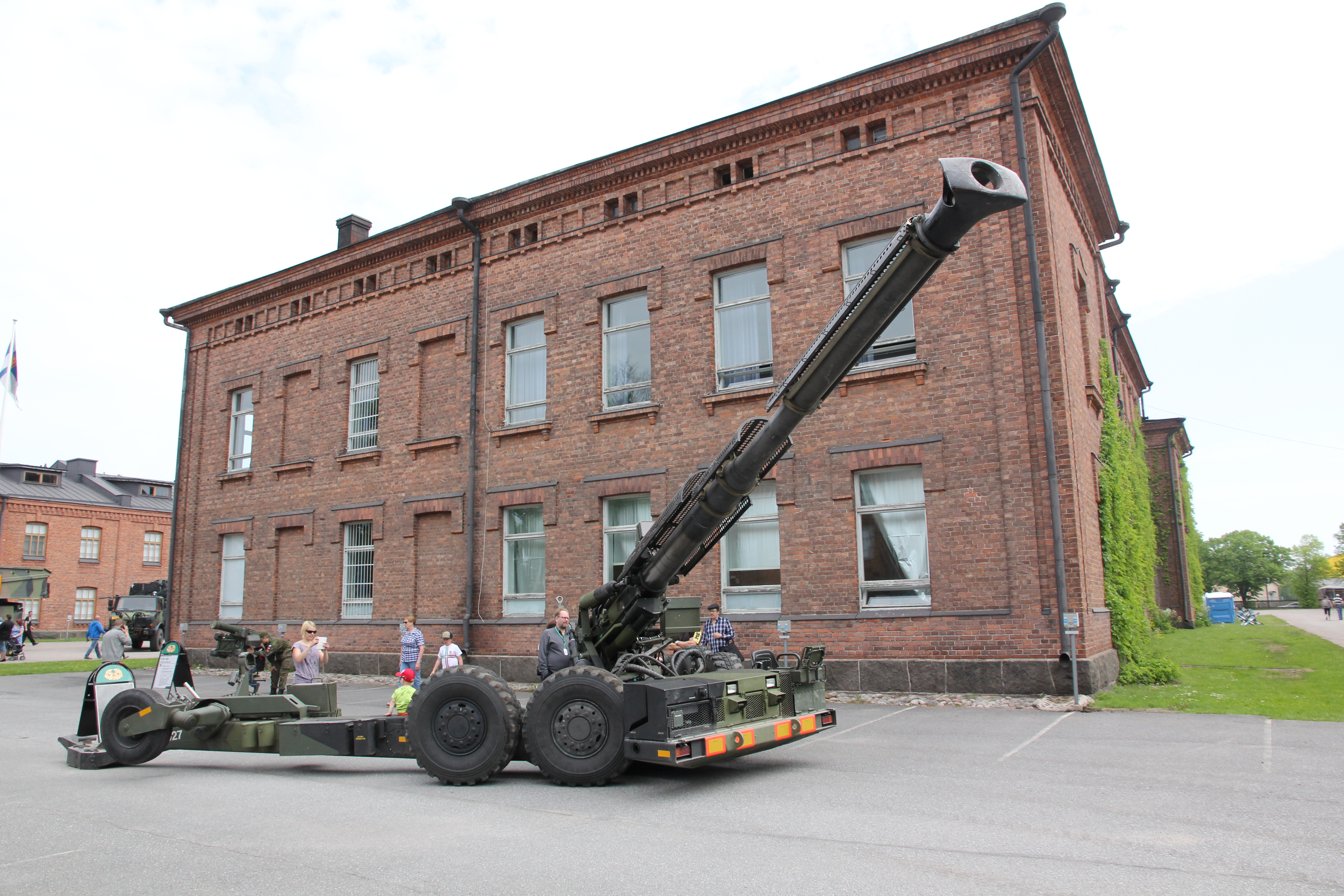
- 155 K 98
- Type: Gun-howitzer
- Place of origin: Finland

Service history
- In service: 1998–
- Used by: Finnish Army; Egyptian Army

Production history
- Designer: Patria
- Manufacturer: Patria; Abu Zaabal Engineering Industries (licensed production)
- Unit cost: 500,000 €
- Produced: 1998–2005
- No. built: 73+
- Variants: 155 GH 52; 155 GH 52 APU; 155 K 98; 155GH52-SP-T55

Specifications (155 K 98)
- Mass: 13,500 kg (29,800 lb) (without equipment); 14,580 kg (32,140 lb) (fully equipped)
- Barrel length: 8,060 mm (317 in) L/52
- Crew: 1+7
- Shell: 155 mm NATO, separate caseless charge bags
- Shell weight: 43 kg (95 lb) to 47 kg (104 lb)
- Caliber: 155 millimetres (6.1 in)
- Breech: Horizontal semi-automatic sliding block
- Recoil: Hydro-pneumatic
- Carriage: Split trail, sole plate, auxiliary power unit and hydraulics
- Elevation: −5° to +70°
- Traverse: ±35° from centreline
- Rate of fire: 6–10 rounds/min 3 rounds in 12 seconds
- Muzzle velocity: over 900 m/s (3,000 ft/s)
- Effective firing range: 28 kilometres (17 mi) (standard ammunition); 40 kilometres (25 mi) (base bleed ammunition)
- Maximum firing range: 41 kilometres (25 mi)
- Sights: Optical panoramic periscopic dial sight Telescopic direct fire sight
- Engine: Deutz; 78 kW (105 bhp)
- Maximum speed: 15 km/h (9.3 mph); 8 km/h (5.0 mph) (terrain)

The 155 GH 52 APU (which stands for 155 mm gun-howitzer, 52 calibers, auxiliary power unit), Finnish designation 155 K 98 (155 mm kenttäkanuuna 1998 or "155 mm field gun 1998"; FDF terminology does not recognise gun-howitzers), is a Finnish towed artillery piece developed in 1998. It is largely based on the 155 K 83 with some major enhancements. It can be moved on the field short distances with its own auxiliary diesel engine, which is used in all 56 units used by the Finnish defence forces, is a 78-kilowatt Deutz diesel engine. The Egyptian units are not equipped with the APU.

The 155 GH 52 is considered to be one of the most modern field artillery cannons to date and was originally manufactured by Oy Tampella AB industries (today a part of Patria, Patria Vammas Systems Oy). It has a high rate of fire (6 rounds per minute) and can fire all types of 155 mm ammunition.

== Domestic operators ==
The Kainuu Artillery Regiment of Kainuu Brigade in Vuosanka shooting range and the Artillery Brigade in Niinisalo in Pohjankangas shooting range operate the guns in Finland. The artillery units train also at Rovajärvi shooting range in Rovaniemi, Lapland.

In Finnish practice one infantry readiness brigade has one organic artillery regiment consisting of two artillery fire battalions. Both of the artillery fire battalions have 18 cannons divided in three six cannon batteries, which means that an artillery regiment, which is an organic unit for a readiness brigade, should have 36 cannons in its two artillery battalions. Finland has three readiness brigades.

== Export ==
In 2003 a gun was mounted on a Soviet T-55 chassis for use as a self-propelled gun prototype. This vehicle was designed primarily as a design study for the Egyptian Army. It was later sold to Egypt, but no deal of more units were made.

On 21 May 2007, the Finnish Yleisradio revealed some problems with the 155 GH 52 APU, dealing with reliability issues of the towing system and barrel behavior when firing long-distance rounds. These facts had been withheld from the Egyptians at the time of the deal. The major challenges have been the accuracy of fire in the longest distances and barrel wear with same distances.

The arms deal lead into a juridical process formally presented as an allegation of corruption. Inspector Janne Järvinen and state prosecutor Ari-Pekka Koivisto investigated if the 10% trade commission had been partly allocated to the directors of the buying organisation using the commercial agent.

== Characteristics ==
The gun's deployment power is 78 kW and its driven speed (in terrain, to location) is 7.5 km/h or 15 km/h when pulled by a heavy truck. The cost of one system is 500,000 euros.

After having encountered problems with firing at 35 km – 40 km, the Finnish Army concentrated its artillery gun development on the M270 Multiple Launch Rocket System (in Finnish arsenal 298 RsRakH 06, later 298 RSRAKH 06) bought as Dutch surplus.

== Variants ==
Based on the 155 K98 cannon, Patria developed the 155GH52-SP-T55. It is a turreted variant of the cannon which is installed on a T-55 tank chassis, and was developed to be exported to Egypt.

Based on the 155 K98, Patria and Sisu are developing a wheeled self-propelled howitzer. The platform would be the Sisu E13TP. An initial digital designed was made public in 2015. In 2024, the development of the project by Patria advanced with the intent to make a prototype. The first prototype was unveiled in 2025 at Arctic Event 2025, and its name was unveiled, the Patria ARVE.

== Operators ==
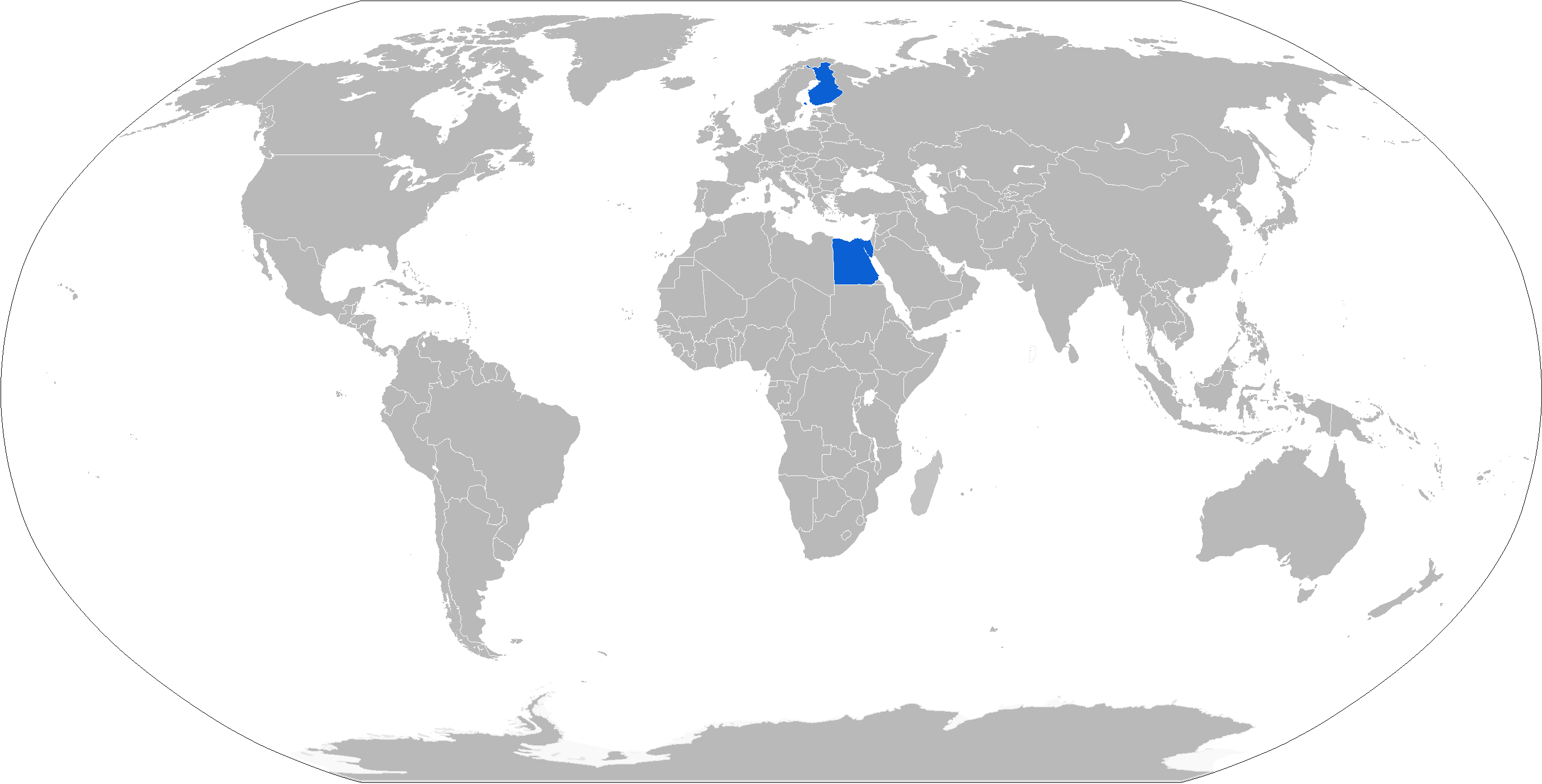
Map with 155 GH 52 APU operators in blue

=== Current operators ===
- Egypt – at least 16 units, variant 155 GH 52 without the APU.
- Finland – 56 units.

== See also ==
- List of artillery
- 122 K 60 – (Finland)
- 130 K 90-60 – (Finland)
- 155 K 83 – (Finland)
- Patria ARVE
- Soltam M-68 – (Israel)
- Soltam M-71 – (Israel)
