= 155 K 83 =

Finnish 155 mm towed field gun

Tampella 155 K 83
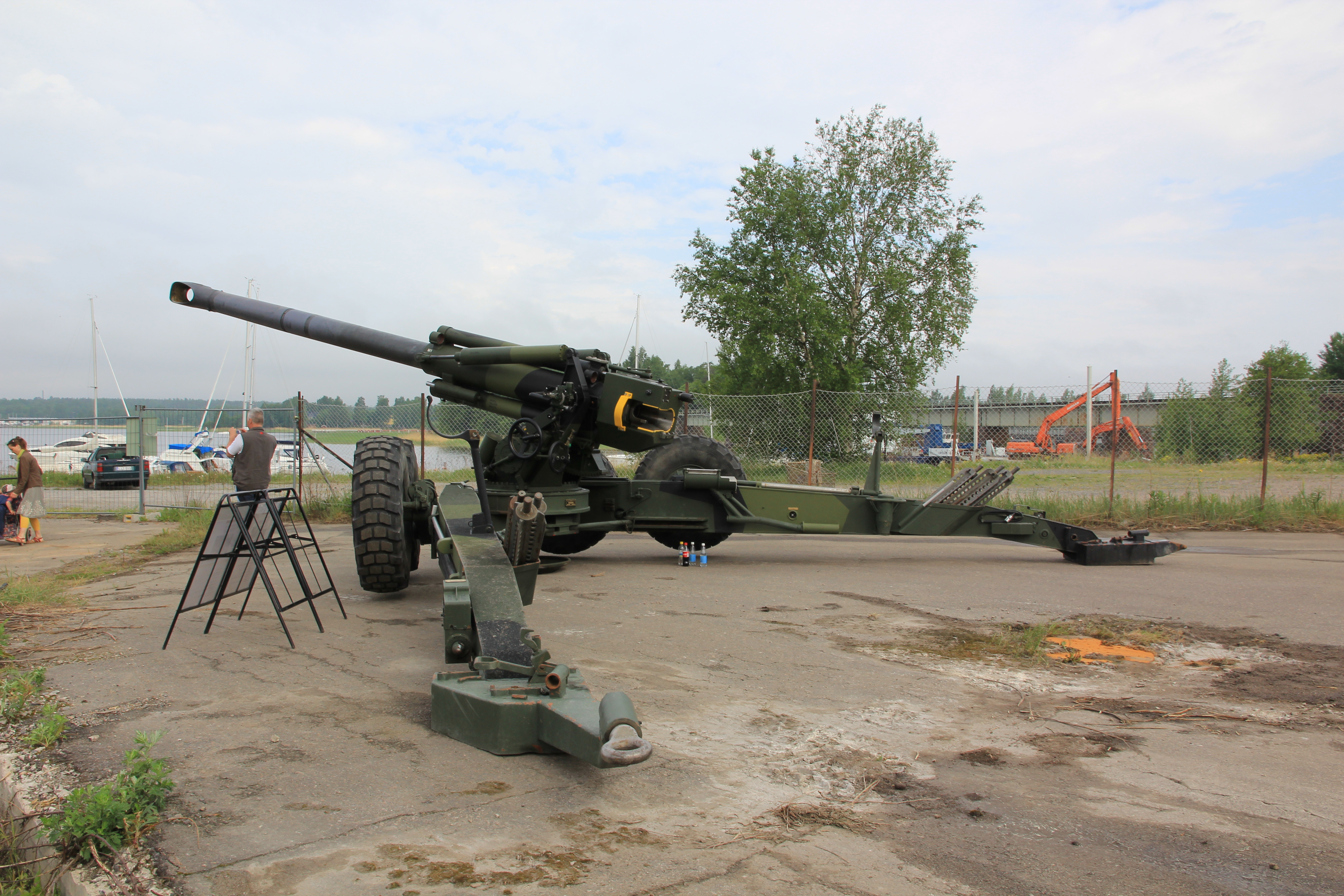
- Modernized 155 K 83-97
- Type: Field gun Gun-howitzer
- Place of origin: Finland

Service history
- In service: 1983
- Used by: Finland

Production history
- Designer: Heikki Collanus
- Designed: 1981-1983
- Manufacturer: Tampella (1982-1990); Vammas (1991-1997)
- Produced: 1983-1997
- No. built: 113
- Variants: 155 K 83; 155 K 83–97

Specifications
- Mass: 9,500kg
- Length: 7.6 m (24 ft 11 in)
- Barrel length: 6 m (19 ft 8 in) L39
- Width: 2.6m (towed)
- Height: 2.05m (towed)
- Crew: 1+6
- Caliber: 155 mm (6.1 in)
- Elevation: -5° to 70°
- Traverse: 90°
- Rate of fire: 8 rpm (sustained); 3 rounds/15s (burst)
- Muzzle velocity: Over 800 m/s (2,600 ft/s)
- Effective firing range: 23 km (14 mi) (normal shells)
- Maximum firing range: 30 km (19 mi) (base bleed)

The Tampella 155 K 83 is a Finnish towed 155 mm field gun (Finnish designation; technically it is a gun-howitzer), manufactured in the 1980s by Tampella.

== History ==
The development process for the 155 K 83 began in 1960 when Tampella presented their concept of a new 122 mm gun for the Finnish Army. It was a sound concept, but quite a heavy gun. It was only ordered in small numbers and designated 122 K 60 in Finnish nomenclature. In order to take advantage of the design, a decision was made to further develop this into a 155 mm gun. Through a number of development stages the 155 K 83 was born.

Tampella cooperated with the Israeli group Soltam. The Tampella drawings for the never realized Finnish 122mm 35 K 68 were used to develop the Israeli Soltam M-68, which, after improvements, became the Soltam M-71 (designated the G4 in South Africa). Tampella went on to design and prototype successive models (155): K 68, K 74, K 74–82, K 74–83. The last with a barrel length of 39 calibers (L39) was accepted as the 155 K 83 and placed into production with a run of 113 units.

During the 1990s, certain types of NATO ammunition evolved including some newer specialized charges which required some changes grinding the shape of the firing chamber, and this along with some small improvements to the firing mechanism could be added to the existing gun. This resulted in an upgraded version, called the 155 K 83-97, capable of firing the latest NATO ammunition. (Unmodified guns can still fire the basic rounds.) Some of the 113 guns have been modernized to: 155 K 83-97 standard.

=== Replacement ===
The gun design was further modified in the late 1990s, resulting in an entirely new weapon. The new gun, called 155 GH 52 APU (or 155 K 98 in Finnish Army service), is heavier, has a longer 52 calibers barrel (L52) and an auxiliary power unit, enabling it to move by its own power. The chamber was also changed to support modern NATO-standard charge bags.

== Operators ==
- Finland - 113 units

== See also ==
- 155 K 98 – (Finland)
- Soltam M-71 – (Israel)
