= M-46 field gun =

Towed field gun

M-46 or KS-30
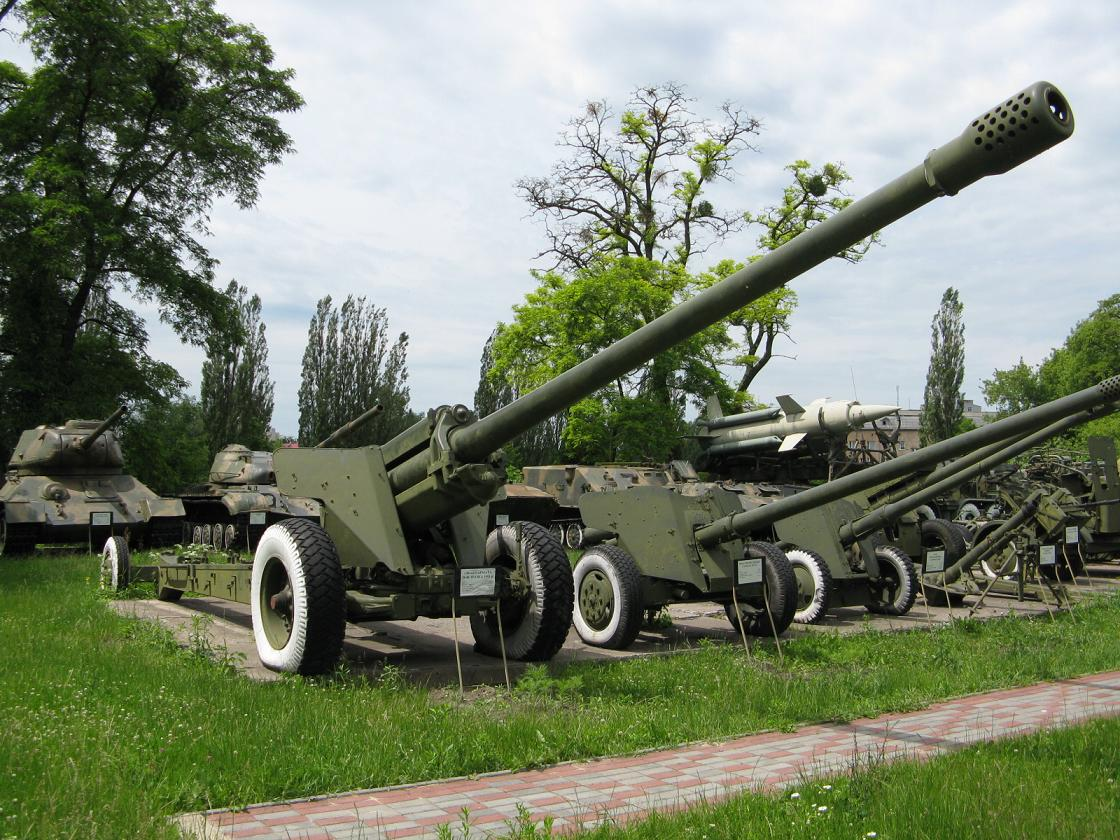
- M-46 130 mm field gun
- Type: Towed field gun
- Place of origin: Soviet Union

Service history
- Wars: Vietnam War; Cambodian Civil War; Eritrean War of Independence; South African Border War; Six-Day War; Yom Kippur War; Ethiopian Civil War; Angolan Civil War; Uganda–Tanzania War; Sino-Vietnamese conflicts (1979–1991); Lebanese Civil War; Iran–Iraq War; Sri Lankan Civil War; First Nagorno-Karabakh War; Yugoslav Wars; Kosovo War; Syrian Civil War; Yemeni Civil War (2014–present); Second Nagorno-Karabakh War; Tigray War; Israeli–Lebanese conflict; Russo-Ukrainian War

Production history
- Designed: 1946–1950
- Manufacturer: MOTZ
- Produced: 1951–1971

Specifications
- Mass: 7,700 kg (17,000 lb)
- Length: 11.73 m (38 ft 6 in)
- Barrel length: Bore: 7.15 m (23 ft 5 in) L/55
- Width: 2.45 m (8 ft)
- Height: 2.55 m (8 ft 4 in)
- Crew: 8
- Shell: 130 x 845 mm R (R/184.6mm) separate-loading charge and projectile
- Caliber: 130 mm (5.1 in)
- Breech: Horizontal sliding-wedge
- Recoil: hydro-pneumatic
- Carriage: Split-trail
- Elevation: −2.5° to 45°
- Traverse: 50°
- Rate of fire: 6 rpm (normal); 8 rpm (burst); 5 rpm (sustained)
- Muzzle velocity: 930 m/s (3,051 ft/s)
- Maximum firing range: 27.15 km (16.87 mi) (unassisted); 35 km (22 mi) (base-bleed); 44 km (27 mi) (rocket assisted)

The 130 mm towed field gun M-46 (Russian: 130-мм пушка M-46) is a manually loaded, towed 130 mm artillery piece, manufactured in the Soviet Union in the 1950s. It was first observed by the West in 1954.

For many years, the M-46 was one of the longest range artillery pieces in existence, with a range of more than 27 km (17 mi) (unassisted) and 40 km (25 mi) (assisted).

== Design history ==
The order was given in April 1946 to design a "duplex" artillery piece to replace the obsolete 122 mm gun M1931/37 (A-19), 152 mm howitzer-gun M1937 (ML-20) and other World War II era field guns, such as 122 mm Model 1931, 152 mm Model 1910/30, 152 mm Model 1935 (BR-2). The new pieces, designed by the factory No 172 (MOTZ), shared the same carriage and were given the designators M-46 (130 mm) and M-47 (152 mm). The respective GRAU designators are 52-P-482 and 52-P-547. The development phase was finished in 1950 and one year later, series production began. Many M-46s were exported.

A second "duplex" artillery system was subsequently designed by FF Petrov's design bureau at Artillery Factory No 9. This comprised a 122 mm gun and a 152 mm howitzer. The D-74 122 mm field gun was a competitor to the M-46; and while many were produced, the M-46 became the only long range gun in Soviet service until new 152 mm guns were made in the 1970s.

== Description ==
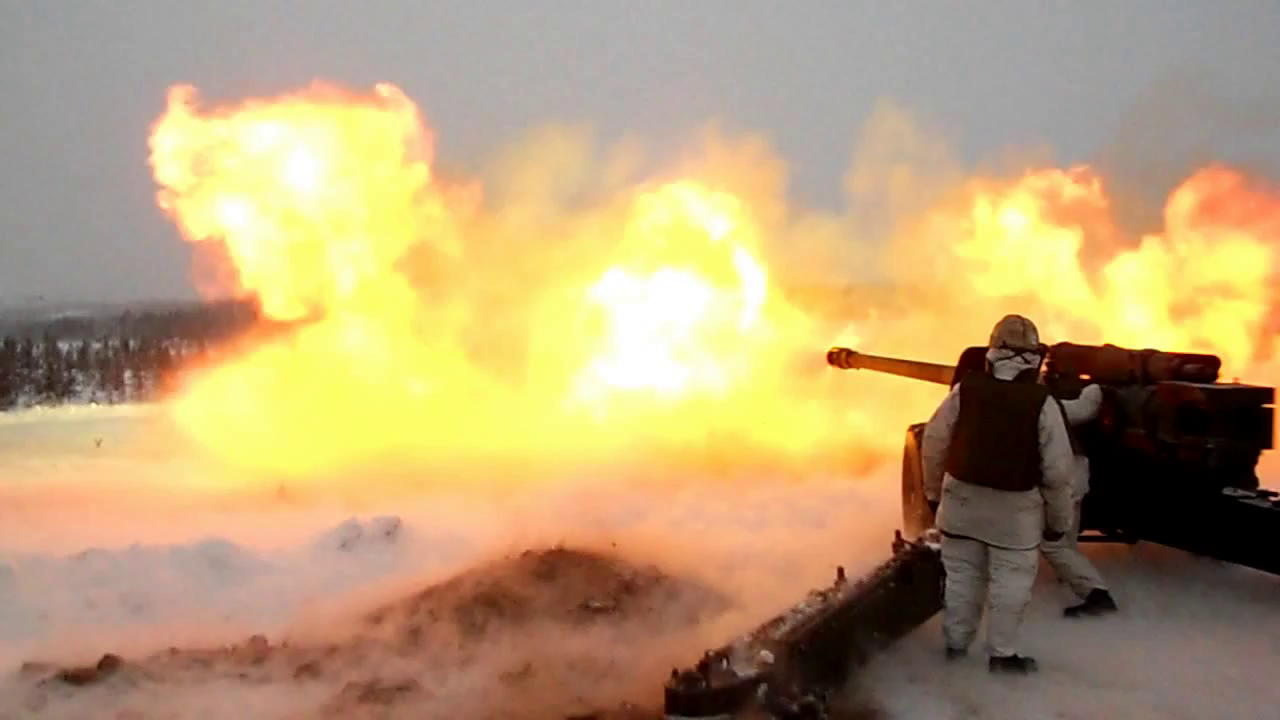
The Finnish Defence Forces using 130 mm gun M-46 during a direct fire mission in a live fire exercise in 2010.

The M-46 was developed from the M-36 130 mm naval gun used on ships and for coast defence. It is a true gun, being unable to fire much above 45° and having a long barrel and a single propelling charge. In contrast, most Western field guns of this period had a dual high and low angle fire ability, a gun-howitzer.

It has a 55 calibre barrel with a tied jaw horizontal sliding-block breech and 'pepperpot' muzzle brake. The latter is not notably efficient, but subjective reports suggest that it is quite effective in reducing muzzle flash. The hydro-pneumatic recoil system comprises a buffer below the barrel and a recuperator above the barrel. The long barrel enables a substantial propelling charge by providing more length in which to achieve 'all-burnt' and hence projectile acceleration space and thus achieve its 930 m/s muzzle velocity.

The barrel is mounted on a split-trail carriage, with deep box section trails and foam filled road wheels on the ground when firing and 50° of top traverse. The small shield protects little more than the sights, possible including from the effects of muzzle blast, and some protection from machine gun fire in anti-tank engagements. The gun has long and robust trails to provide stability when firing, a large detachable spade is fitted to the end of each when the gun is brought into action.

Non-reciprocating sights are standard Soviet pattern, designed for one-man laying. Included are a direct fire anti-tank telescope, a panoramic periscopic indirect-fire sight (a dial sight) in a reciprocating mounting, an angle of sight scale, and a range drum engraved with the range (distance) scale, coupled to a mounted elevation levelling bubble. The range drum enables the standard Soviet technique of semi-direct fire when the piece is laid visually on the target and the range set on the range drum. An APN-3 was later provided for direct fire at night in place of the day telescope.

For travel, the gun is towed via a two-wheeled limber fitted to the end of the closed trails, with the spades removed and carried on each trail. Simple jacks on the trails just behind the main wheels are used to lift and support the closed trails so that the limber can be connected. The barrel and recuperator are pulled back between the closed trails and locked in a travelling position. There is a large bicycle chain arrangement on the right trail for this, and a compressed air cylinder, charged by the gun firing, is used to bring the barrel forward when the gun is brought back into action. It takes about four minutes to bring the gun into action, the normal detachment is eight strong.

Propelling charges are in metal cartridge cases and loaded separately from the projectile. Projectiles originally included HE fragmentation, Armour Piercing solid shot, smoke, illuminating and chemical. HE shells weigh ~33 kg (73 lb). Illuminating shells have a substantially lower muzzle velocity. APHE and extended range shells were introduced later. Maximum rate of fire is probably 6-7 rounds/minute, and about 70 rounds/hour. The standard Soviet unit of fire was 80 rounds.

== Operational history ==
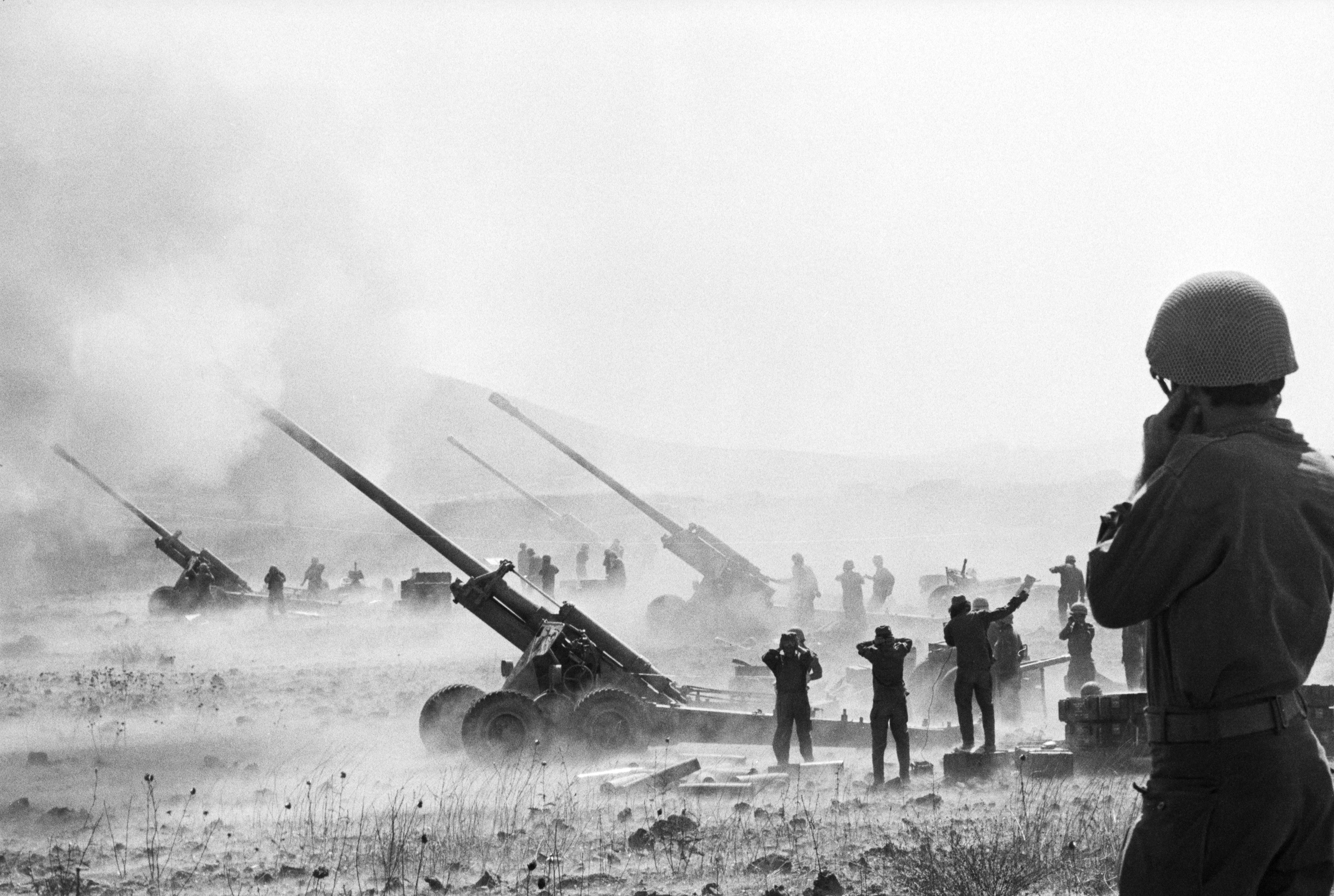
Israeli M-46s open fire on Syrian positions during the Yom Kippur War.

The M-46 was first seen openly at the 1954 May Day Parade in Moscow. It initially replaced the 100 mm BS-3 field and anti-tank gun. However, its long range made it well suited for counter-battery actions. There are reports of poor fragmentation. Its Soviet use with an integrated fire-control system including SNAR-2 radars has also been reported. In Soviet service, M-46 battalions were in Army and Front artillery brigades.

It is or has been in service with at least 25 countries and has been license manufactured in China as the Type 59. It was replaced in Soviet/Russian inventory by the 2A36 Giatsint-B and the self-propelled 2S5 Giatsint-S. Several companies, like Soltam and RDM Technology BV, have presented upgrade packages for the gun. These include, for instance, an upgrade to a 45 caliber 155 mm gun. Its long range made it especially useful in the Vietnam War.

The M-46 saw extensive combat service with the People's Armed Forces for the Liberation of Angola (FAPLA) during the Angolan Civil War and South African Border War. From the mid to late 1970s Angolan M-46s were deployed with some success in the counter-battery role against South African artillery units, which possessed comparatively short-ranged BL 5.5-inch medium guns. South Africa later acquired six M-46s from Israel for evaluation purposes; this likely influenced its development of the G5 howitzer, which was adopted to counter the range and effectiveness of the FAPLA field guns. Cuba also deployed M-46 batteries of its own in support of FAPLA operations during its lengthy military intervention in Angola. Cuban and FAPLA M-46s were used most notably during the Battle of Cuito Cuanavale, where individual guns were deployed in ones or twos rather than concentrated in single positions to reduce the threat posed by counter-battery fire from South African G5s. Cuban tacticians were able to repeatedly stall a South African mechanized and armored offensive by using minefields to channel the attackers into bottlenecks where the M-46s could concentrate their fire.

Tanzania People's Defence Force fielded some M-46 guns during Uganda–Tanzania War in 1978–1979.

A version of this gun, possibly the Chinese-manufactured Type 59–1, is suspected to have been used by North Korea for shelling the South Korean island of Yeonpyeong in the Yellow Sea on 23 November 2010.

The Russian Ground Forces deployed M-46 guns during the Russian invasion of Ukraine. Up to half the M-46s in reserve storage were scheduled to be reactivated in 2024 to replace heavy losses of Russian towed artillery. According to Ukrainian press reports, Russia has increasingly sourced the guns' 130mm shells from North Korea as its domestic stockpiles of this ammunition type have been depleted by the war.

== Variants ==
=== Soviet Union ===
- M-47 – This is a 152 mm field gun (Russian: 152-мм пушка M-47 обр. 1953 г.) that was developed alongside the M-46. The M-47 had a range of 20,470 m and was far less successful than its 130 mm counterpart. Only a small number was built between 1954 and 1957. Externally, the M-46 and M-47 are virtually identical, except for the calibre.

=== China ===
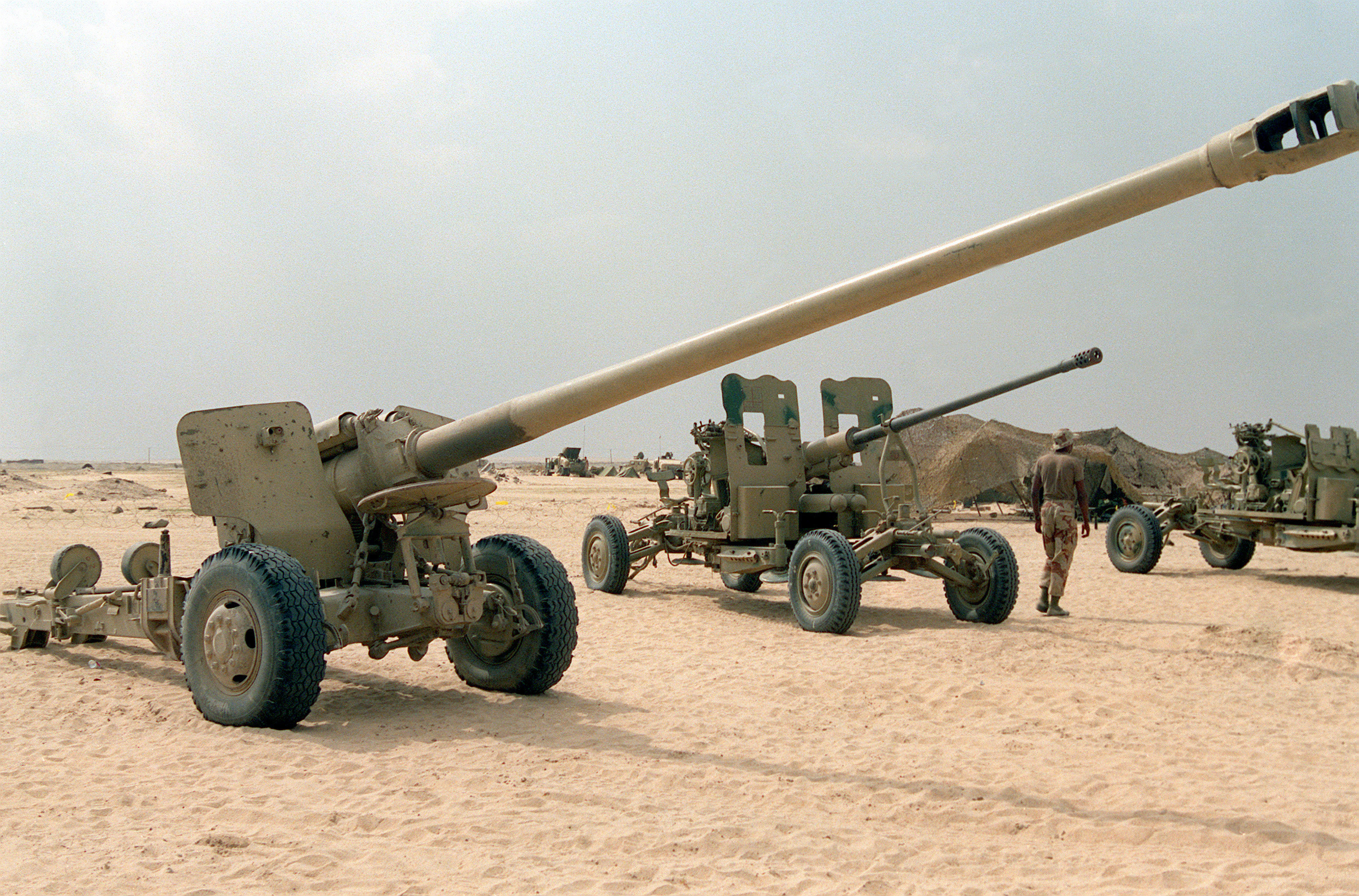
Iraqi Type 59-1

- Type 59 – This is a licensed version of the M-46.

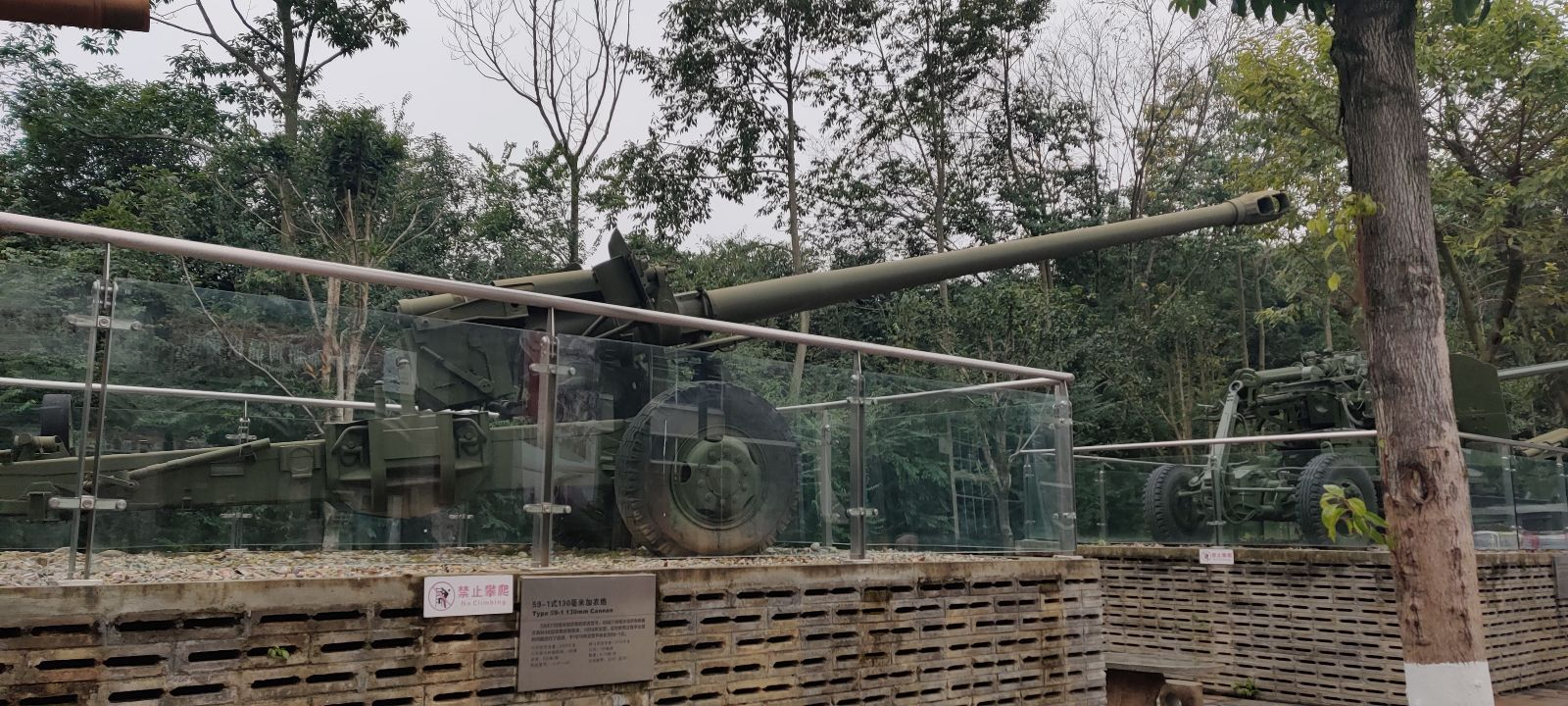
Retired Type 59-1 in Jianchuan Museum

- Type 59-1 – This is a combination of the 130 mm ordnance of the Type 59 with the carriage of the Type 60 (D-74 copy). The result is a gun with the same range as the M-46, but with a much lower weight of 6.3 t. The M59-1M is the Egyptian licence version. For the export market, a version with APU and redesigned carriage was developed. Also for the export market, a self-propelled variant, based on the Type 83 SPH was designed.
- Type GM-45 – For the export market, NORINCO (China North Industries Corporation) developed this upgrade package where the original barrel of the Type 59 is replaced by the 155/45 mm ordnance of the WA 021. The Type GM-45 has a maximum range of 39 km when ERFB-BB ammunition is used.

=== Cuba ===
- The Cuban army operates two different, locally designed self-propelled versions of the M-46. One is based on the tracked chassis of the T-34-85 tank, while the other is based on a heavily modified KrAZ 6x6 truck. These and other modifications were shown for the first time during the 2006 military parade.

=== Egypt ===
- The Egyptian Army operates a locally assembled variant of the M-46

=== India ===
- The Indian Army has a total of around 1,000 of the 130 mm towed guns that were acquired from the former Soviet Union starting in 1968.
- Project Karan – Indian Army contracted the Israeli firm Soltam to upgun a total of 180 M-46 guns of 9 artillery regiments to 155 mm 45-calibre guns. All were delivered as of 2018.
- Project Sharang – Another 155 mm upgrade of M-46 towed guns is being careied out by state-owned Ordnance Factory Board (OFB). The upgraded M-46, weighing 8.4 tonnes, has a range of 39 km. The warhead per round has been increased from 3.4 kg of TNT to 8 kg of TNT. After the upgrade the total length and width of the gun measured 11.84 m and 2.45 m with a 6.9 m-long barrel. On 25 October 2018, the Ministry of Defence (MoD) has awarded an ₹2 billion (equivalent to ₹2.7 billion or US$28 million in 2023) contract to the OFB for the upgrade. As per the contract, 300 units of M-46 field guns of 15 artillery regiments will be upgraded to 155 mm 45-calibre to augment the Army's firepower. Post corporisation of Ordnance Factories, the order of these guns is with AWEIL and AVNL. The upgrade is being carried out at Vehicle Factory Jabalpur and Gun Carriage Factory Jabalpur of AVNL and AWEIL, respectively. AVNL had delivered at least 26 units of Sharang by of July 2024. In September 2025, further induction of Sharang guns was halted after mechanical, electrical, electronic, and metallurgical defects were found in the 159 guns delivered since the delivery of first consignment of 18 guns March 2020. One of the defective component was the gun's muzzle brake which AWEIL procured from a private company. This component posed a safety threat to the personnel operating the gun. AWEIL failed to rectify the issues despite formal communication with the firm since two years.
- SP-130 "Catapult" – Indian-designed self-propelled version, mounted on the hull of the Vijayanta tank.

=== Israel ===
- M-46S – This is an upgrade of an existing M-46 or Type 59, carried out by Soltam Systems Ltd. The original barrel is replaced by a new model of 155/45mm (western ammunition) for a range of 25.8 (HE) to 39 km (ERFB-BB). A 39-calibre barrel is optional. In March 2000, Soltam won a contract worth $47,524,137 for upgrading 180 M-46s to M-46S standard (Indian designator: 155/45mm (E1) Soltam). A follow-on deal for 250 retrofit kits was optioned for. In 2005, after only 40 howitzers were modified, the M-46S programme was terminated due to a fatal barrel explosion.

=== North Korea ===
The US Defense Intelligence Agency has reported the existence of a number of locally designed self-propelled artillery systems, including the SPG 130 mm M1975, the SPG 130 mm M1981 and the SPG 130 mm M1991. Details are not available, but they appear to be M-46/Type 59s mounted on a tracked chassis “Tokchon”.

=== Serbia ===
- M46/84 – This is a conversion that involved replacing the original 130 mm barrel with a new 155/45 mm barrel or 152 mm barrel. With ERFB-BB ammunition, this version has a range of 38,600 m and with M05 152 mm range exceeds 40 km.

=== Netherlands ===
- RDM Technology BV is yet another company that offers an upgrade of the M-46/Type 59 that involves fitting a new 155mm/45 barrel.

=== Romania ===
- A412 – License-built Chinese Type 59–1 with D-20 carriage. In Romanian Army service, the A412 is known as the 130 mm towed gun M1982 (Romanian: Tun calibrul 130-mm tractat M1982). The A412 was also exported.

Type 59-1 was manufactured by Arsenal Resita under the designation A412 Model 1982 between 1982 and 1989. A maximum range of 33 km (21 mi) was reached Using NORINCO's Base Bleed ammunition. The A412 cannon can fire a 7-8 rounds per minute. The A412 was exported to four other countries: Bosnia-Herzegovina, Cameroon, Guinea, and Nigeria.

=== Vietnam ===
- PTH130-K225B – A self-propelled prototype placed on KrAZ 6x6 truck was revealed, based on Cuba's variant. An updated prototype mounted on a KamAZ-6560 8×8 truck chassis was reavealed on The 12th Congress of the Military Party Committee in October 2025.

== Projectiles ==
Russian M-46 cannon firing.

- Frag-HE, 3OF33 (with full charge 3VOF43) – range: 27,490 meters
- Frag-HE, 3OF33 (with separate charge 3VOF44) – range: 22,490 meters
- Frag-HE, ERFB-BB – Extended Range Full Bore – Base Bleed, range: 38,000 meters
- APCBC-HE-T, BR-482 and BR-482B – range: 1,140 meters
- Guided Shell, Firn-1 – range: 24,000 meters
- Smoke
- Chemical
- Illumination

== Operators ==
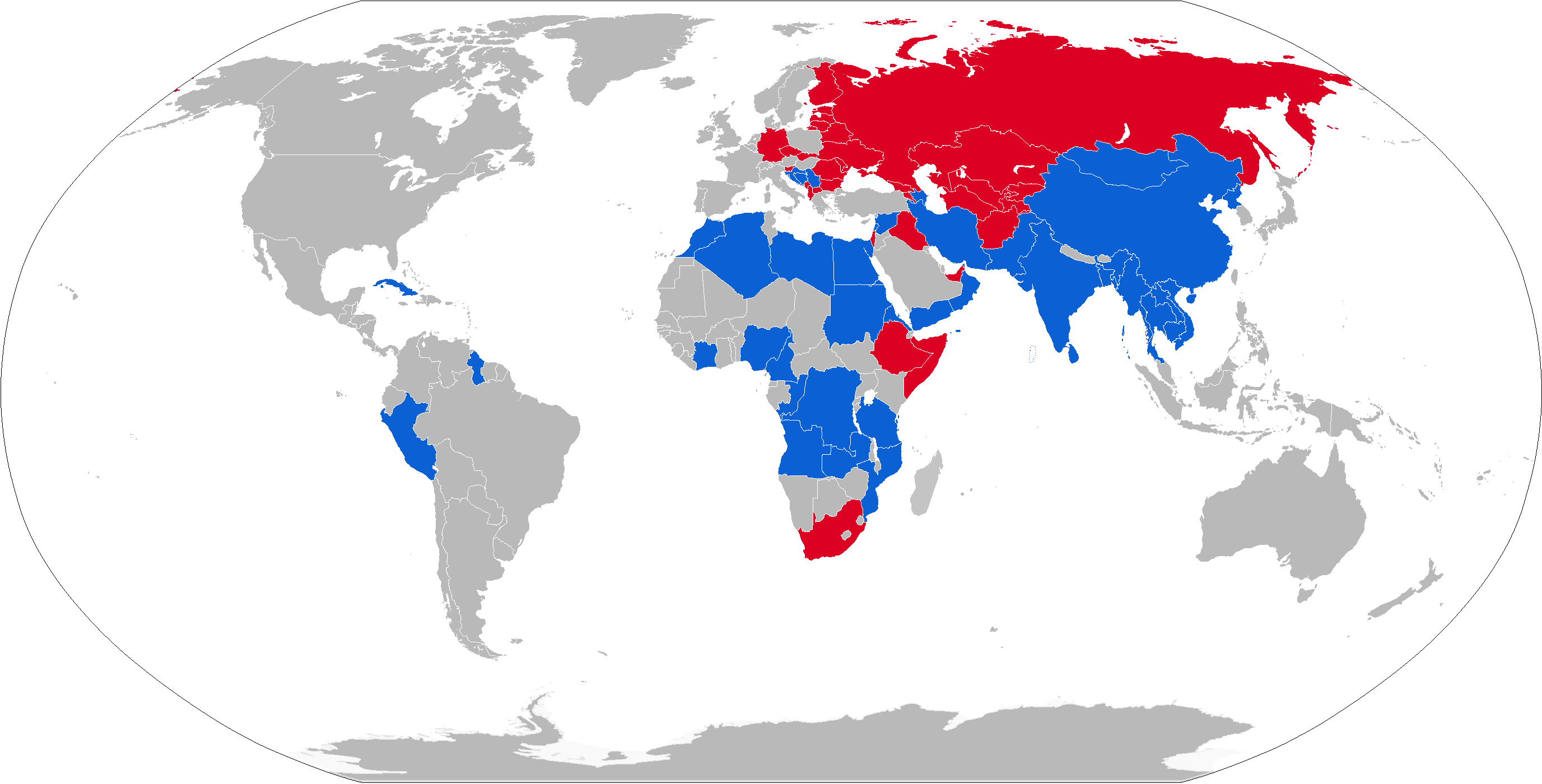
Map with M1954 operators in blue with former operators in red

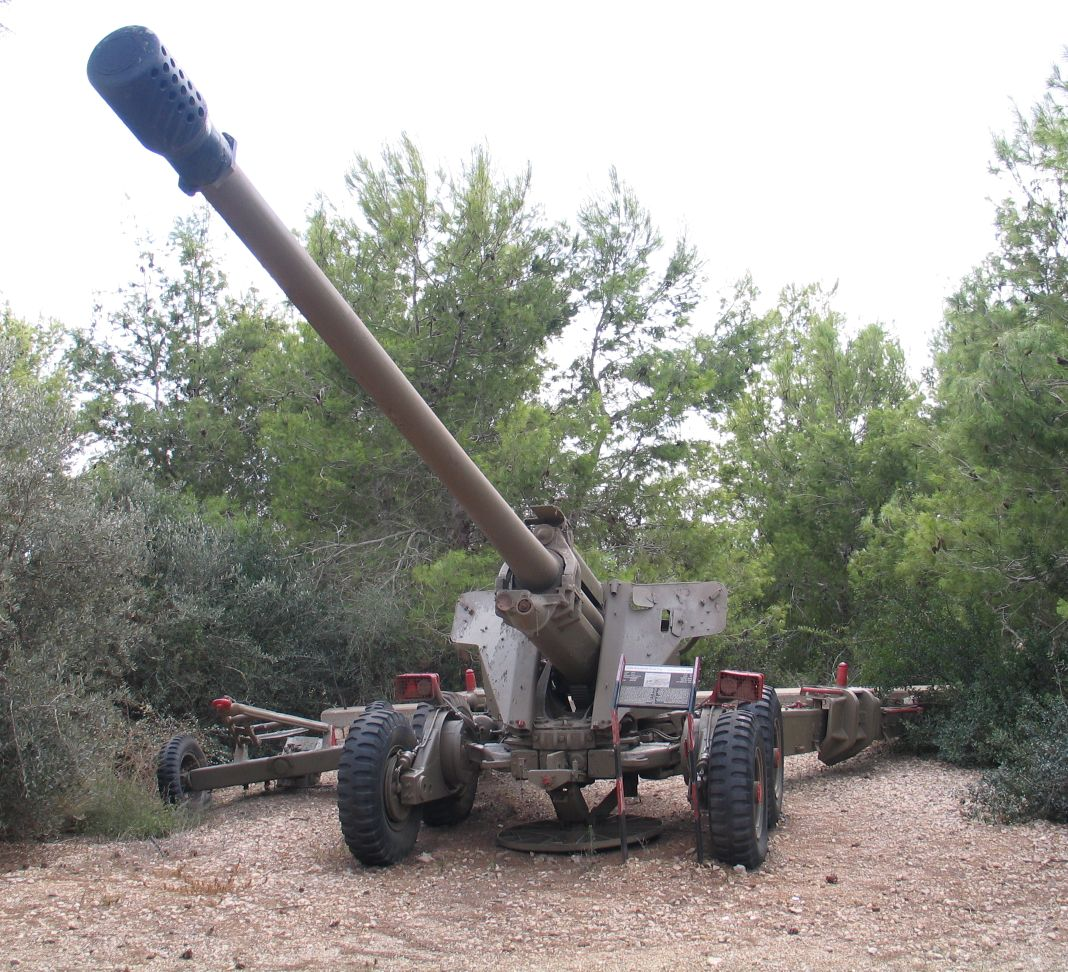
M-46 in an Israeli museum. The carriage is fitted with an extra axle and wheels to give a 'walking' suspension, and a sole plate is added.

- Algeria − 10 as of 2024
- Angola − 48 as of 2024
- Azerbaijan − 35 as of 2024
- Bangladesh − 62 Type-59-1 as of 2024
- Cambodia − Type 59-1, unknown number in service as of 2024
- Cameroon − 12 A412 (reported) and 12 Type 59 as of 2024
- China − 100 Type 59 and Type 59-1 as of 2024
- Congo-Brazzaville − 5 as of 2024
- Congo-Kinshasa − 42 Type 59 and Type-59-I as of 2024
- Cuba − Unknown number in service as of 2024
- Egypt − 420 as of 2024, unknown number of guns converted into self-propelled guns
- Eritrea − 19 as of 2024
- Ethiopia − Unknown number in service as of 2024
- Guinea − 12 as of 2024
- Guyana − 6 as of 2024, serviceability doubtful
- India − ~600 in service and ~500 in storage as of 2024; 200 modified to 155 mm caliber
- Iran − The first batch of 136 supplied in 1970. 985 as of 2024
- Iraq − 60+ M-46 and Type 59 as of 2024
  - Popular Mobilization Forces
- Kurdistan Region
- Laos − 10 as of 2024
- Lebanon − 15 as of 2024
  - Hezbollah − Used in Syria
- Mongolia − Unknown number in service as of 2024
- Morocco − 18 as of 2024
- Mozambique − 6 as of 2024
- Myanmar − unknown number in service as of 2024
- Nigeria − 7 as of 2024
- North Korea − Unknown number in service as of 2024
- Oman − 12 M-46s and 12 Type 59-I as of 2024
- Pakistan − 410 Type 59-I as of 2024
- Peru − 36 as of 2024
- Russia − 350 as of 2024
- Serbia − 18 as of 2024
- South Sudan − Unknown number in service as of 2024
- Sri Lanka − 30 Type 59-I as of 2024
- Sudan − Unknown number of M-46 and Type 59-I in service as of 2024
- Syria − Unknown number in service as of 2024
  - (Syria) Free Syrian Army
- Tanzania − 30 Type 59-I as of 2024
- Turkmenistan − 6 as of 2024
- Uganda − 221 as of 2024
- Ukraine − 15 as of 2024
- United Arab Emirates: 20 Type 59-I as of 2024
- Vietnam − Unknown number in service as of 2024
- Zambia − 18 as of 2024

=== Former operators ===
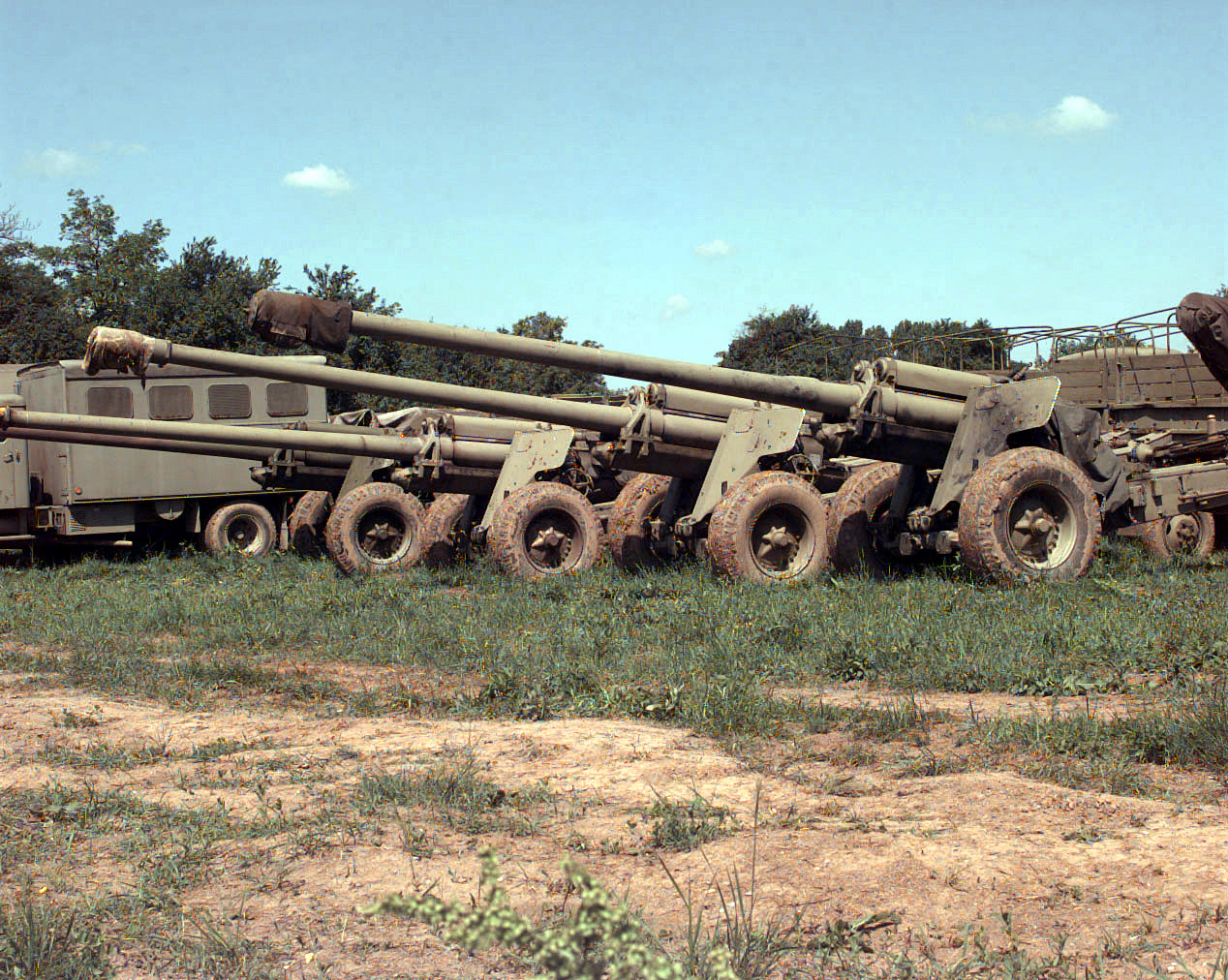
M-46 guns of the Army of Republika Srpska during the Bosnian War.

- Afghanistan
- Albania − 18 Type 59-I in 2011
- Bosnia and Herzegovina − 61 in 2011
- Bulgaria − 60 in 2011
- Croatia − 79 in 2011
- East Germany- Passed on to the reunified German state in 1990
- Finland − 322 units, designated as 130 K 54
- Germany - Former East German guns; 166 sold to Finland in 1993
- Guinea-Bissau
- Islamic State − 34
- Israel − 40 M-46 converted to 155 mm in storage as of 2024
- Liberation Tigers of Tamil Eelam − 12 Type 59-I
- Libya − 330 in 2011
- Mali
- Montenegro − 18 in 2011
- Palestine Liberation Organization − 10 acquired from East Germany
- Poland
- Romania − 130 mm towed gun M1982, no longer in front line service in 2011
- Somalia
- South Africa − 6 on loan from Israel, later returned
- South Lebanon Army − 5 acquired from Israel
- Soviet Union- Passed on to the Russian Federation's armed forces and various successor states in 1991
- Tigray Defense Forces − At least 9 in 2021. Surrendered to the Ethiopian forces in the aftermath of the Tigray War
- Yemen − 60 in 2011
- Yugoslavia

== See also ==
- 180 mm gun S-23

== Bibliography ==
- Foss, Christopher F., ed. (1990). Jane's Armour and Artillery 1990-91 (11th ed.). Jane's Information Group. ISBN 978-0-7106-0909-0.
- Foss, Christopher F., ed. (2011). Jane's Armour and Artillery 2011-2012. Jane's Information Group. ISBN 978-0-7106-2960-9.
- International Institute for Strategic Studies (2024). The Military Balance 2024. Taylor & Francis. ISBN 978-1-040-05115-3.
