= Rascal (artillery) =

The Rascal 155mm Light Self-Propelled Howitzer is a lightweight mobile artillery system developed by Soltam Ltd, Israel.

The small size and weight of the Rascal allows for it to be transported around an active battlefield by means of air, sea, truck, and railway transport. As it is self propelled, it also maintains the ability to change locations on its own, eliminating the need for a third party means of mobility as is necessary for larger artillery.

The vehicle is not based on any existing tank. The hull has a raised drivers compartment at the left front, the engine being behind the driver, and a central compartment for the commander and two gunners.

The 155mm (6.1 in) howitzer is installed on a platform at the rear of the vehicle and is power-operated. The gun may be either 39 or 52 calibers in length.

The Rascal Light carries 40 rounds of ammunition on board. These shells are stored in racks alongside the gun and cartridges in an Armour-protected compartment in the hull.
