= 130 K 90-60 =

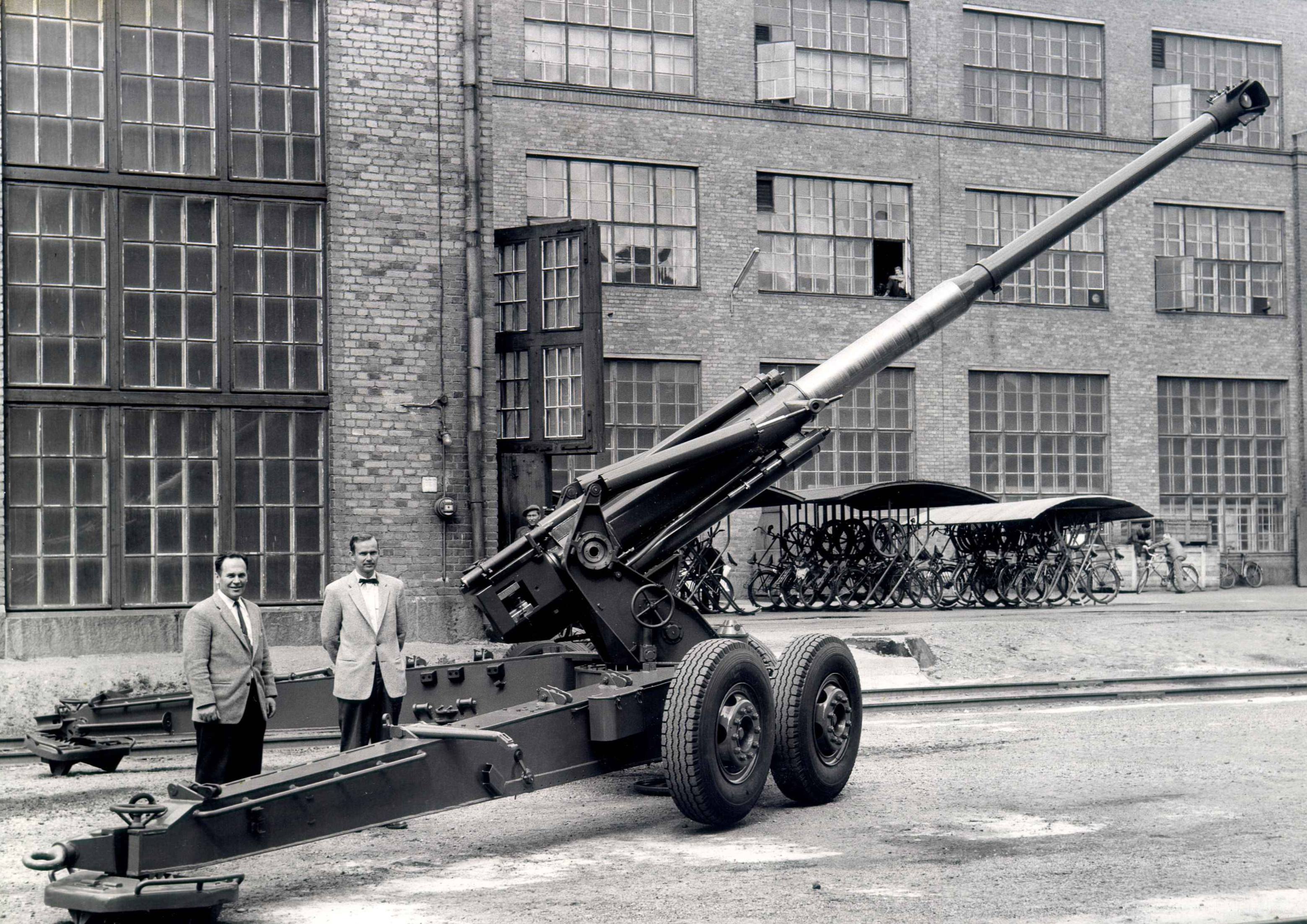
- Tampella 122 K 60 field gun
- Type: Field gun
- Place of origin: Finland

Specifications
- Mass: 10,150 kg
- Barrel length: 6.851 m L/52.7
- Caliber: 130 mm
- Breech: horizontal, half-automatic
- Rate of fire: 8 rounds per minute

The 130 K 90-60 is a Finnish towed 130 mm coastal artillery piece, manufactured in the 1980s by Vammas.

== History ==
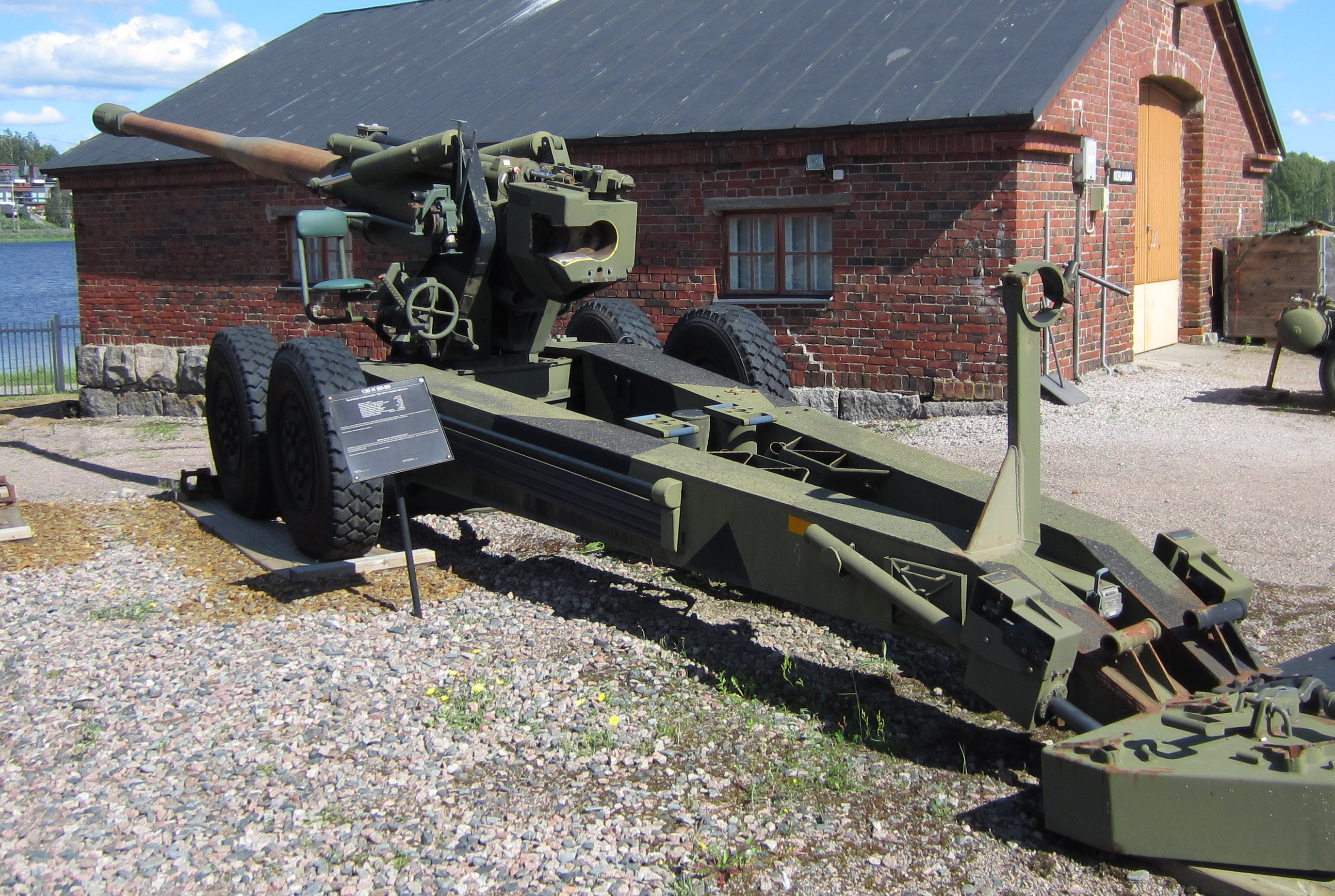
A 130 K 90-60 at Finnish Artillery Museum.

The development process for the 130 K 90-60 began in 1960 when the Finnish company Tampella presented their concept of a new 122 mm gun for the Finnish Army. This gun was called 122 K 60. It was a sound concept, but quite a heavy gun. It was only ordered in small numbers; only 1 prototype and 15 production guns were built and only 15 delivered to military, and it was never part of the war-time inventory.

All 15 guns were later modified by Vammas in the late 1980s, giving it a 130 mm calibre barrel. This was done in order to standardize the calibre for the mobile coastal artillery. The new gun was given the designation 130 K 90-60.

The gun carriage design was used for Tampella's 155 mm series, as well as for the Israeli Soltam M-68 gun.

The 130 K 90-60 was retired from service in 2006.

== Operators ==
- Finland: Finnish Navy, 15 units.

== See also ==
- 130 53 TK – (Finland)
- 130 K 54 – (Soviet Union)
