= Soltam Systems =

Arms manufacturing company based in Israel

- Type: Private
- Industry: Defense
- Founded: 1950; 76 years ago
- Founder: Shlomo Zabludowicz
- Headquarters: Yokneam, Israel
- Key people: CEO. Col (ret.) David Marchiano
- Products: Fire support
- Revenue: ▲US$ 150 million (2007)
- Owner: Elbit Systems
- Number of employees: 350 (2007)
- Website: www.elbitsystems.com

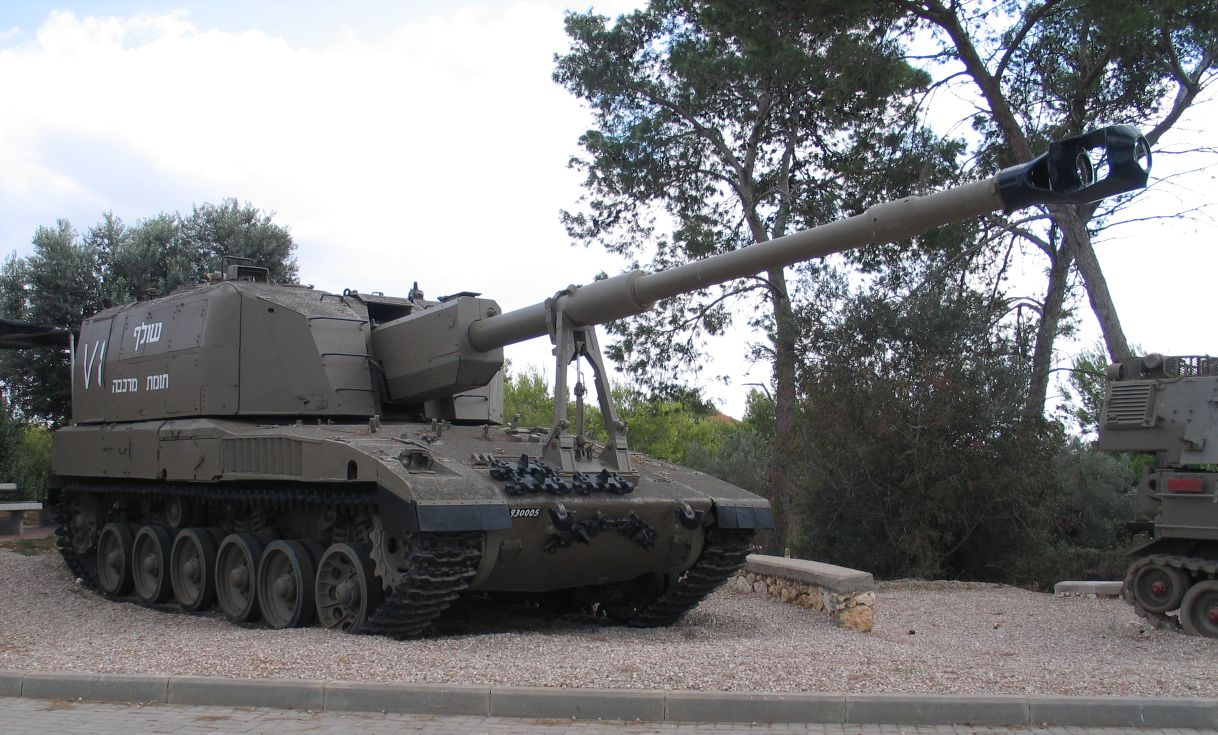
Soltam Systems Sholef

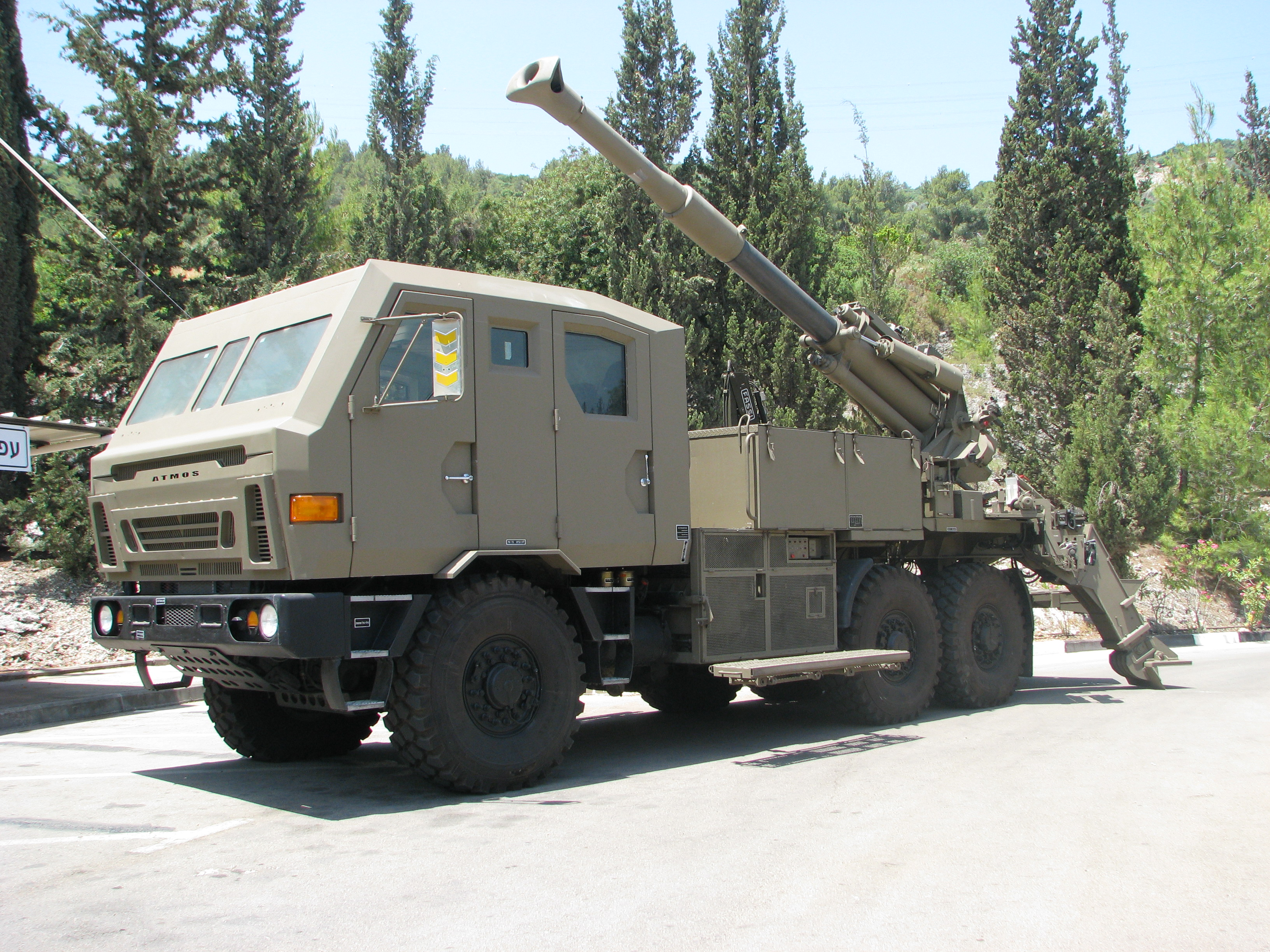
Soltam Systems ATMOS 2000

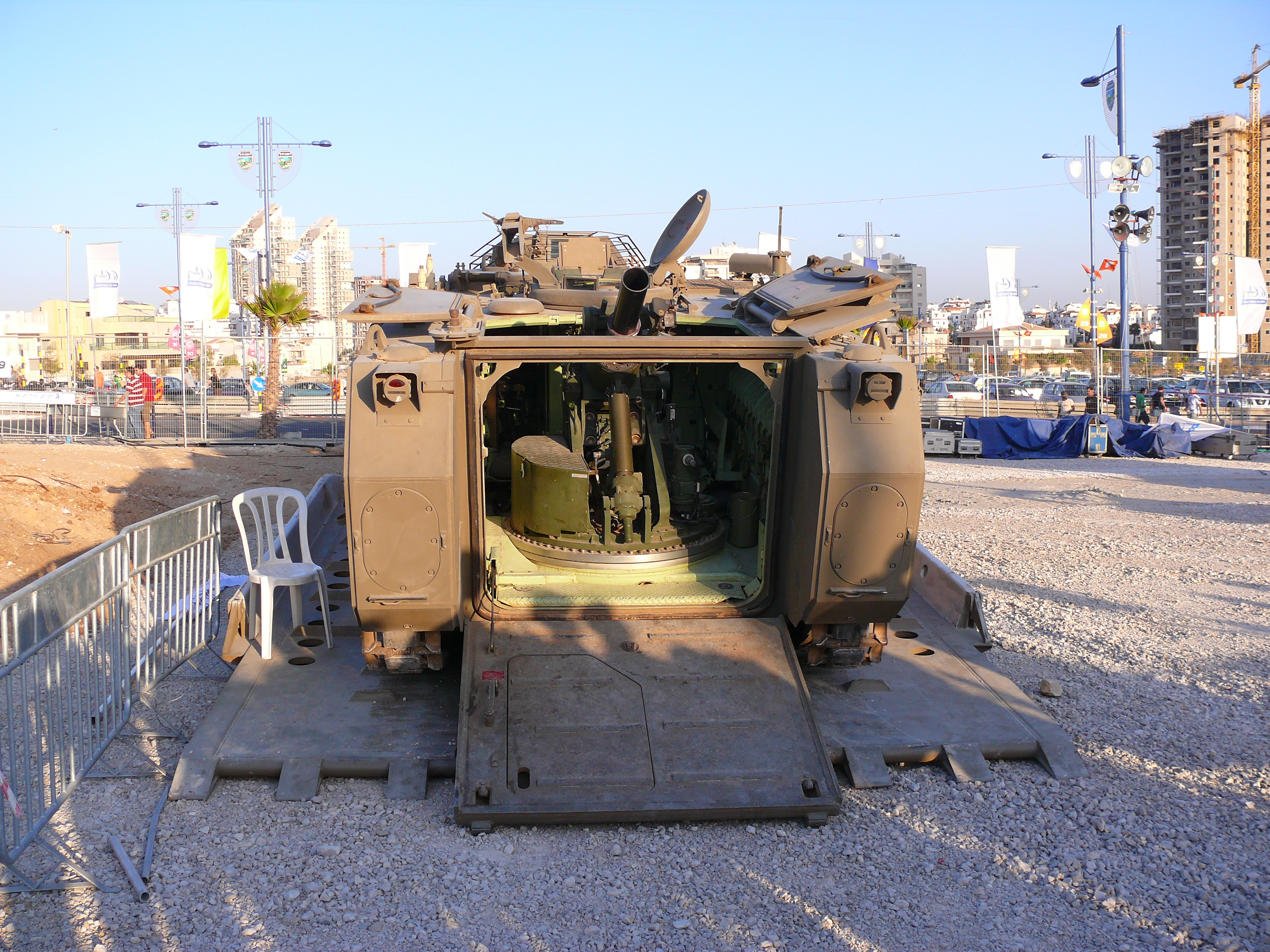
Soltam Cardom 120 mm recoil mortar system

Soltam Systems (Hebrew: סולתם מערכות) is an Israeli defense contractor and kitchen equipment manufacturer located in Yokneam, Israel. The company has been developing and manufacturing advanced artillery systems, mortars, ammunition, peripheral equipment and cooking equipment since 1952. Soltam Systems serves armed and special forces in more than 60 countries as well as the private sector with its kitchen products. Among the company's major customers are the Israel Defense Forces (IDF), the United States Army and NATO countries.

== History ==
Soltam was founded in 1950 by Shlomo Zabludowicz as the IDF artillery manufacturer. The company was founded as a joint venture between the Israeli Solel Boneh and Luxembourg-based Salgad (Societe Anonyme Luxembourgoise de Gestion et D'Administration) which was a fully owned subsidiary of the Finnish artillery and mortar manufacturer Tampella.

In 1998, Koor Industries sold Soltam to MIKAL Group.

In October 2010, Soltam was sold to Elbit Systems and is now entirely owned by them.

== Products ==
=== Artillery ===
- ATMOS 2000 155 mm autonomous, truck mounted self-propelled gun
- ATHOS 2052 155 mm autonomous towed howitzer system
- M-68 towed 155 mm howitzer
- M-71 towed 155 mm howitzer
- Rascal self-propelled 155 mm howitzer
- Slammer (Sholef) - Merkava-based self-propelled 155 mm howitzer

=== Mortars ===
Soltam designs and manufactures a wide range of mortars, to suit a variety of military applications. Soltam supplies a variety of mortars, such as backpacked, under turret, towed and self-propelled recoiling mortars on wheeled or tracked vehicles. All mortars are simple to operate and fast in deployment. Soltam mortars are made of high-quality alloy steel for extra toughness and stability. Mortar systems come with all auxiliary equipment necessary for field operation, including fire control computer, ballistic computer, INS, and target acquisition and location systems. All types of mortar ammunition in use worldwide are authorized to be used with Soltam mortars.

- M-66 160 mm mortar
- 120 mm mortar
  - Cardom 120 mm autonomous recoil mortar system (RMS)
  - Soltam M-65 120 mm mortar towed
  - Soltam K6 120mm mortar
- 81 mm mortar
  - B499 long range
  - B502 long-range split barrel
  - B599 extended range
  - CC8 vehicle mounted mortar

CARDOM recoil mortar system vehicle-mounted mortar

- 60 mm mortar
  - 60 mm commando mortars
  - 60 mm extended range mortars
  - Vehicle mounted 60 mm mortar – internal and external

=== Ammunition ===
Soltam manufactures a wide range of mortar ammunition, ranging in caliber and in use (High Explosive HE, Smoke and training). All mortars comply with NATO standards.

- 155 mm
- 120 mm
- 81 mm
- 60 mm

=== Kitchen equipment ===
in addition to its military manufacturing Soltam also sells a variety of cooking products to the civilian market, mainly pots and pans but also others such as knives, cutting boards and spatulas.

== See also ==
- Military equipment of Israel
