= 130 53 TK =

130 mm tornikanuuna
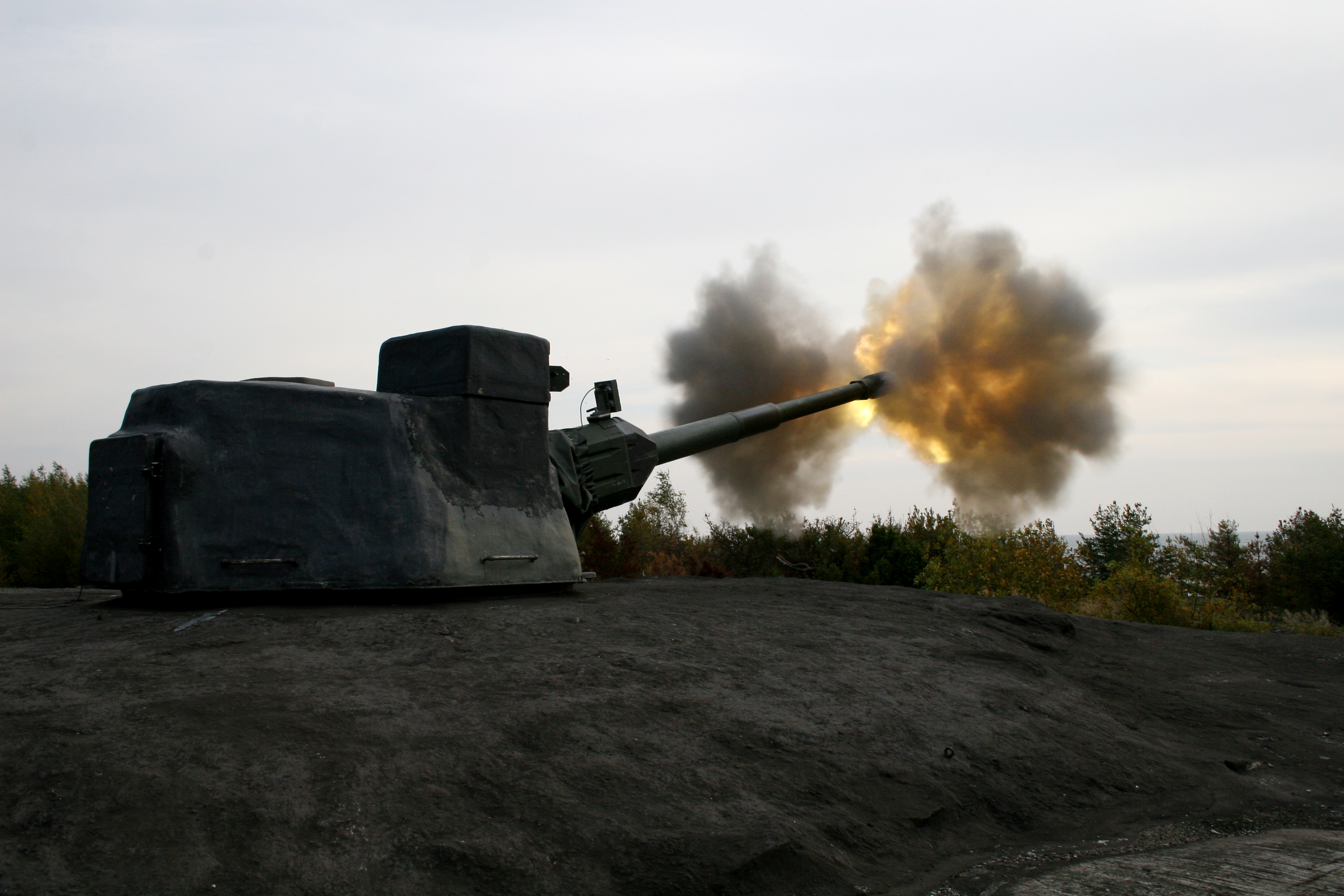
- 130 53 TK located in Isosaari, Finland.
- Type: Fixed coastal artillery gun
- Place of origin: Finland

Service history
- In service: 1984–present
- Used by: Coastal artillery of Finland

Production history
- Designer: Tampella
- Manufacturer: Tampella
- Produced: 1982–1990

Specifications
- Mass: 16,000 kg (35,000 lb)
- Barrel length: 6.890 m (22 ft 7 in) L/53
- Crew: 3+7
- Shell: 130 x 846 mm R
- Caliber: 130 mm (5.1 in)
- Action: Automatic
- Rate of fire: 6 rounds/min
- Muzzle velocity: 860 m/s (2,800 ft/s)
- Maximum firing range: 27 km (17 mi) (unassisted); 40 km (25 mi) (assisted)

130 53 TK firing practice

The 130 53 TK or 130 TK (130 millimetrin 53 kaliiperin tornikanuuna, "130 mm 53 caliber turret cannon") is a Finnish fixed heavy artillery piece, manufactured by Tampella. The caliber is 130 mm. The 130 53 TK is the main weapon of the Finnish coastal artillery.

The maximum firing range with high-explosive fragmentation shells is 27 km and with anti-ship base bleed shells is 40 km. The initial velocity of the shot is around 860 m/s depending on the shell and amount of propellant used. When firing temporary bursts with auto-loader the gun can fire 3 shots in 20 seconds and up to 6 shots per minute during sustained firing. The gun weighs 16,000 kg (including shield) and the length of the barrel is 6,818 mm. The gun is operated by 3 NCOs and 7 soldiers.

The development of the 130 TK started in the 1970s and lasted for 10 years. In 1971, the Finnish national defence committee suggested that the then main current coastal artillery gun (152/50 T) would be replaced by the end of the 1970s. A development contract was signed with Tampella in 1975. It was decided that the calibre would be 130 mm, since the mobile coastal artillery used towed guns of same calibre (130 K 54). A prototype was constructed on the island of Isosaari in 1980, where test firing was conducted until 1983.

The Finnish Defence Forces signed a series production contract with Tampella in 1982. The first battery was installed in 1984 and the final battery was installed in 1990. The spaces required for the gun, such as room for the gun crew and ammunition storage was built inside the base rock with concrete casemates for shaping.

Initially, there were no special sea target shells, instead, regular fragmentation shells were used with timed, immediate and delayed fuses for differences in desired effect. A first attempt to develop sea target shells failed in the 1980s, with the company going bankrupt. A fresh start was done in the beginning of the 1990s for payload shells similar to some anti-tank shells.

Targeting for these guns is done by a targeting team either using a laser range and direction finder or optically with triangulation (requiring two teams). The triangulation method is safer as there is nothing transmitted towards the target as in the laser rangefinder case. The coordinates (if laser acquired) or directional information in the case of triangulation are sent to a calculation unit which then calculates the targeting solution for the guns. This is a continuous (tracking) operation since the targets are moving. The gun itself can be directed manually with the data coming from the central calculation unit or fully automatically based on the data received via a data bus from the central calculator. The gun is also fully capable of autonomous operation with its own laser rangefinder and firing solution computer.

== See also ==
- 12/70 TAP, a comparable Swedish coastal artillery system made by Bofors.
