= Tampella =

Finnish heavy industry manufacturer

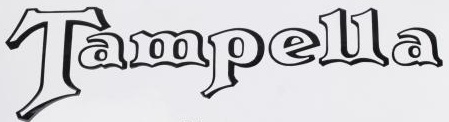

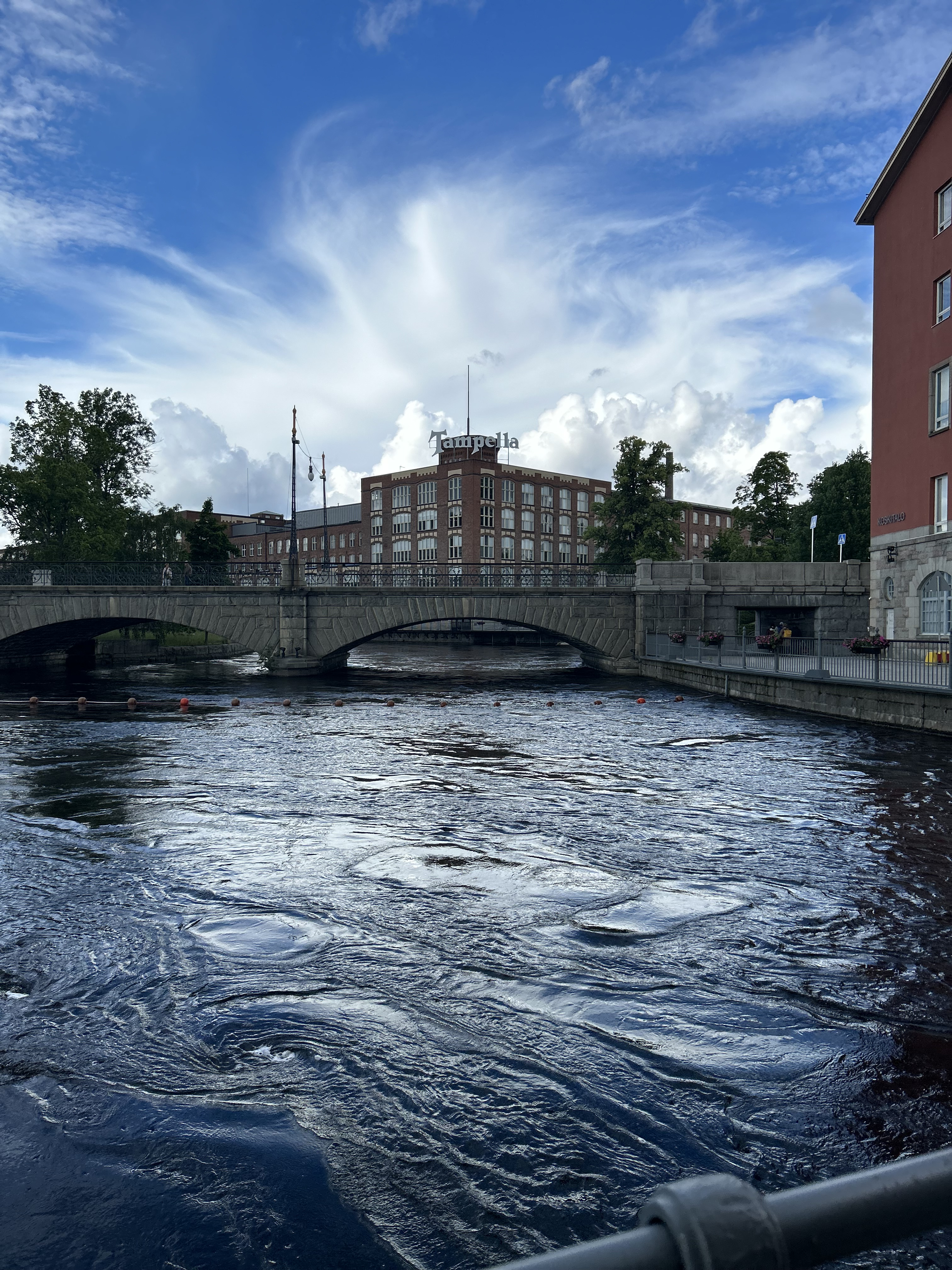
- Predecessor: Tampella blast furnace
- Founded: 1861
- Founder: Adolf Törngren
- Defunct: 1991
- Successor: Sandvik (Finland); Tambox Europe; Tampella Forest; Tampella Papertech; Tampella Power; Vammas
- Headquarters: Tampere
- Number of employees: 12,000 (1980s)

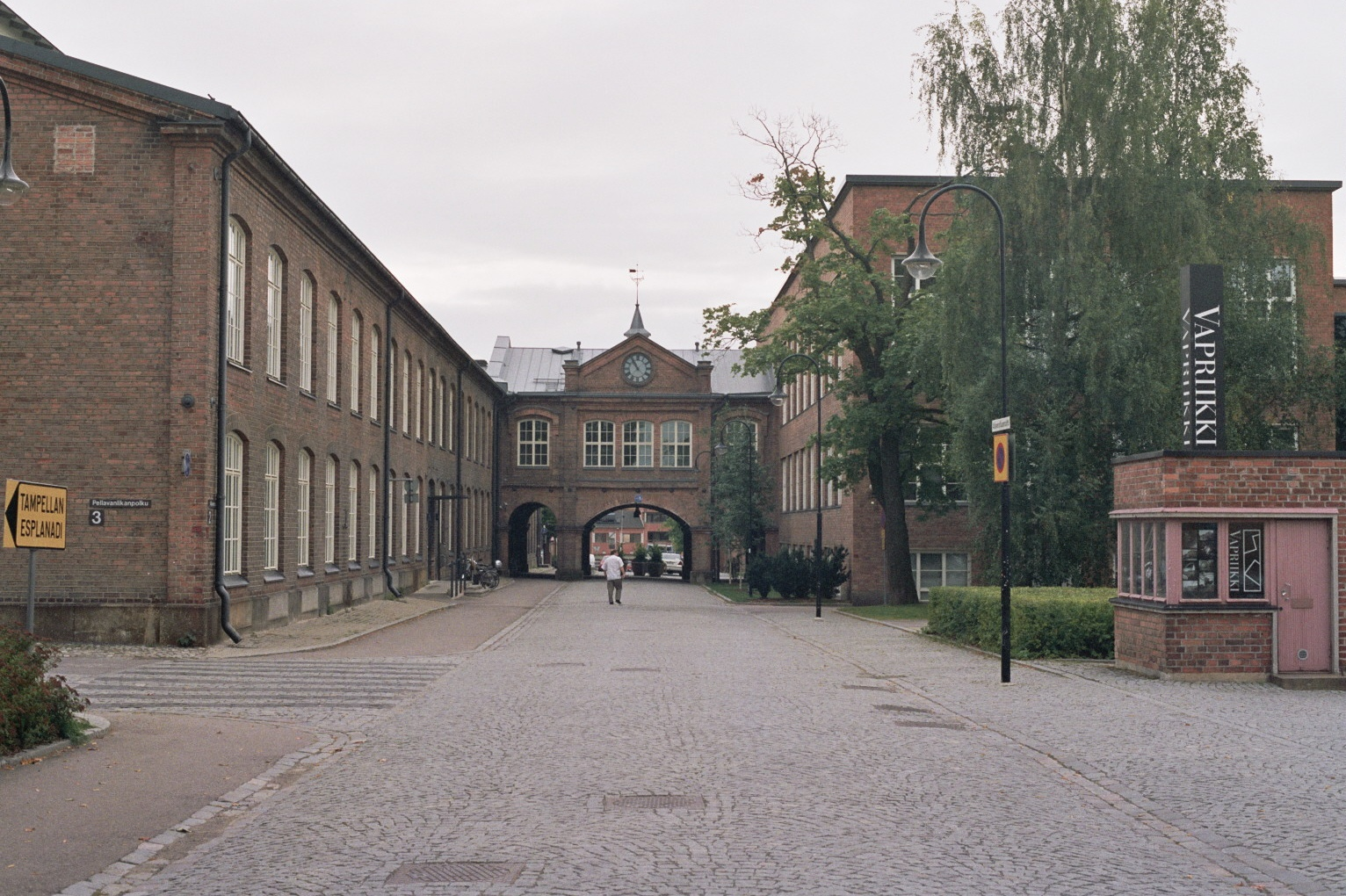
The former Tampella factory in Tampere, and factory's clock gate, which was built in 1891.

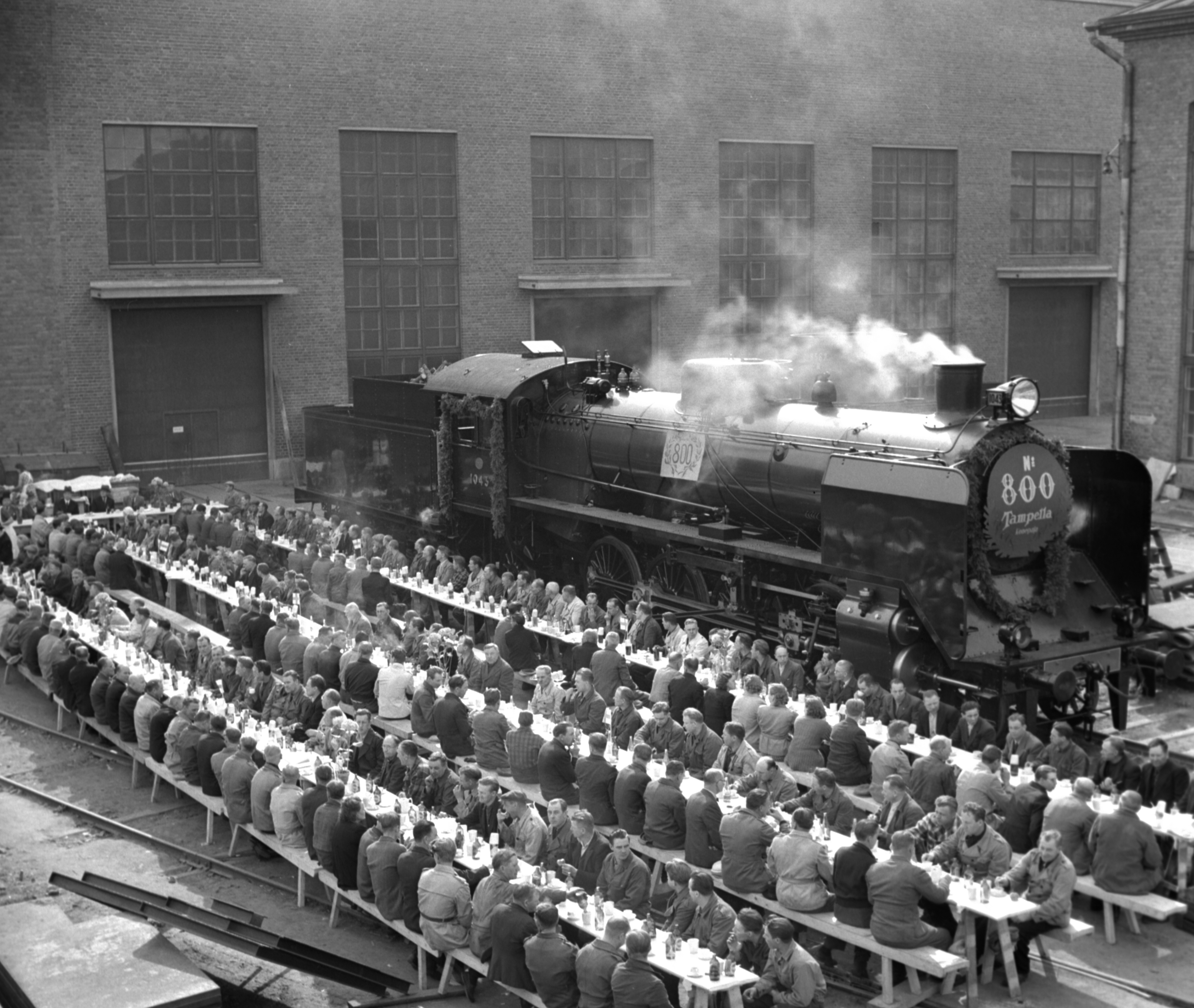
Celebrating the 800th locomotive manufactured by Tampella. Tr1 steam locomotive number 1043. Photo by Veikko Kanninen, Vapriikki Photo Archives.

Oy Tampella Ab was a Finnish heavy industry manufacturer, a maker of paper machines, locomotives, military weaponry, as well as wood-based products such as packaging. The company was based mainly in the Naistenlahti district of the city of Tampere.

Until 1963 the company was called Tampereen Pellava- ja Rauta-Teollisuus Osake-Yhtiö (The Flax and Iron Industry of Tampere Stock Company). In Swedish it was called Tammerfors Linne- & Jern-Manufaktur A.-B.. In 1993 the company’s forest and packaging business was bought by Enso-Gutzeit Oy.

Tampereen Pellava- ja Rautateollisuus Oy was a company based on the merger in 1861 of two factories - a linen mill and foundry - situated by the Tammerkoski rapids. After a modest start, it grew to become an institution employing thousands of people in the centre of Tampere alone, and more at its other units. In the 1950s the company's name was shortened to Tampella. The company went into decline during the 1980s and eventually went bankrupt in 1990. This was at a time just before the economic recession of the early 1990s. After bankruptcy the company's operations were split and sold to various, mostly international, owners.

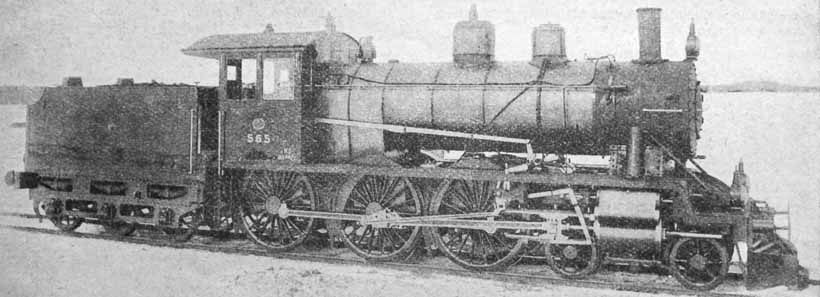
A Finnish VR Class Hv1 4-6-0 steam locomotive, built by Tampella in 1915.

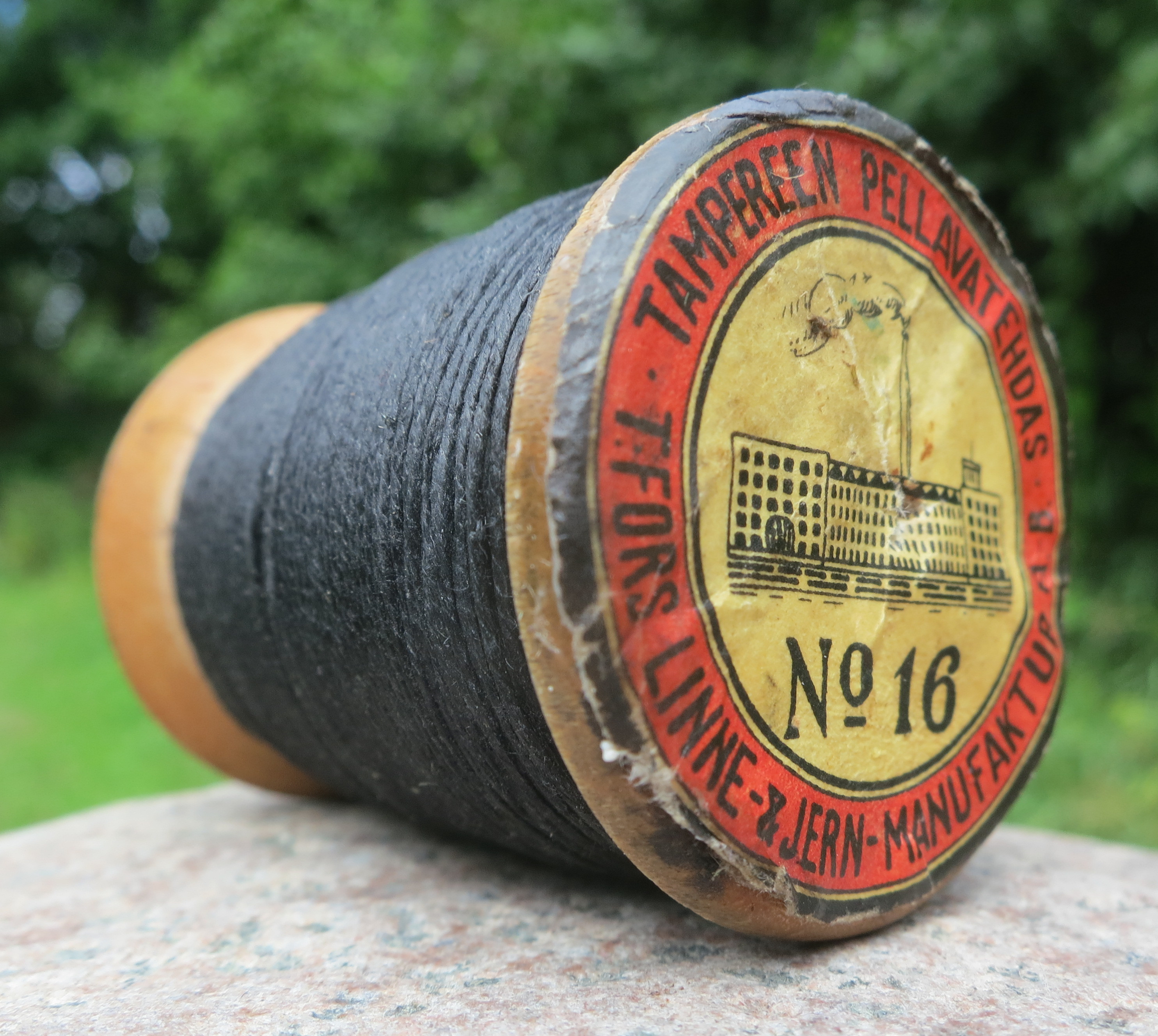
Pre-1938 linen thread by Tampella (Tammerfors Linne- & Jern-manufaktur A.-B.)

Among the company's products was the manufacture of linen: in later times this was not an important product, but the company continued it for apparently historic reasons. However, its main concern was iron and steel products. These included grave crosses (in the very early days), guns, mining drills, paper machines, locomotives (both steam and diesel), steam boilers and turbines. The company also produced cardboard and packaging at its Inkeroinen mill.

The industrial activity, under the new ownership, in the centre of Tampere gradually ceased and the machines finally stopped operating in 2000. Soon after this, many of the buildings in the industrial complex have been taken into new uses as museums, cultural centres, artist's workshops etc. though some had already been demolished. Other buildings were converted to new commercial uses, but many were demolished to make way for blocks of flats.

Together with an Israeli cooperative organisation Solel Boneh, Tampella also founded the Israeli defence contractor Soltam, in 1950.

== Weaponry ==
=== Field cannons ===
- 122K/60, 122 mm field cannon, prototype 122K/57, 15 pieces of 122K/60 manufactured. The Israeli Soltam company became interested and the 152HX-K60 was developed
- 152HX-K60
- 155HX, 24 November 1971, 2 pieces, at least one of them was delivered to Soltam, Israel
- 155KAN68, manufactured for Soltam to Israel, 2 lots x 12 pieces each in 1970 - 1975, 12 pieces to Singapore, sub-type Pore
  - M-68, a Soltam made 155KAN68
    - Philippines, Singapore, Chile, Thailand, South Africa, several hundreds. M-68 had been the main cannon for the Israeli Defence Forces
  - one 155KAN68 delivered to the Soviet union, barrel 10 February 1977, suspenser 11 March 1977 and launcher 9 February 1978
- 155HZ
- 155K74 developed from 155KAN68 sub-type Pore-13
- 155 K 83, prototype 155K74-83
- 155GH45T
  - 155GH45 PAKISTAN, testing 1996-1997 in Pakistan
- 155K93
- 155HG52APU
- 155 K 98

=== Anti-tank guns ===
- 57/76 Pst
- 75 K/44
- 100 PSTK

=== Coastal artillery ===
- 152/50 T, a modernized version of 152 mm 45 caliber Pattern 1892
- 130 53 TK

=== Mortar ===
- 47 Krh/35
- 60 Krh/34
- 81 Krh/34
- 81 Krh/38
- 81 Krh/58P
- 81 Krh/71Y
- 120 Krh/40
- 120 Krh/62A-H
- 120 Krh/85
- 160 Krh/58C
- 300 Krh/42
- B-455 81 mm mortar. Originally designed in Tampella, but manufacturing rights sold to Soltam.

== See also ==
- Finnish Railway Museum
- VR Group
- List of Finnish locomotives
- Jokioinen Museum Railway
- List of railway museums Worldwide
- Heritage railways
- List of heritage railways
- Restored trains
- Hanko–Hyvinkää railway
- History of rail transport in Finland
- VR Class Pr1
- VR Class Hr1
- VR Class Tk3
- VR Class Hr11
