= Soltam M-71 =

Israeli 155 mm towed howitzer

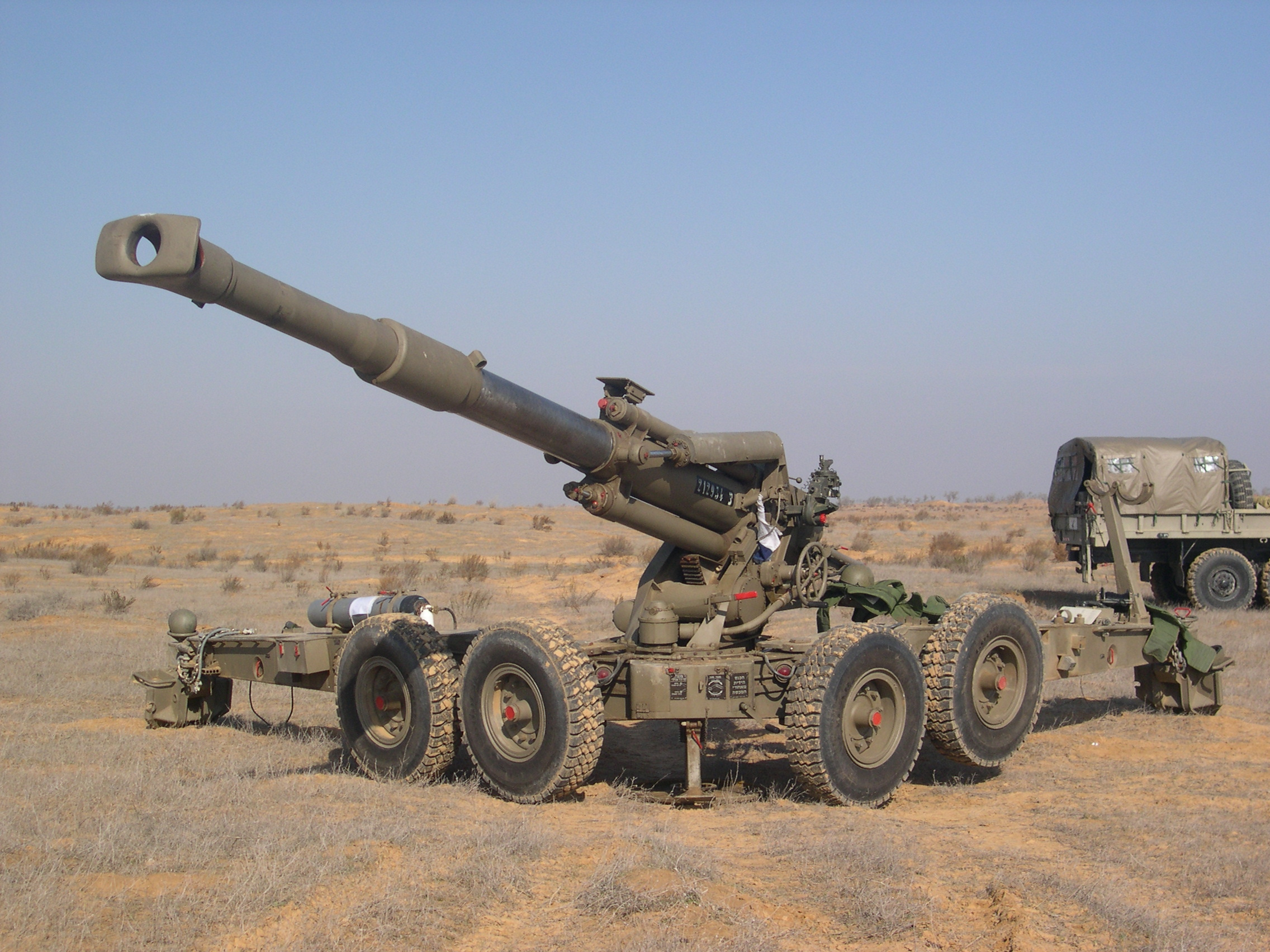
- A deployed M-71
- Type: Howitzer
- Place of origin: Israel

Service history
- Used by: See users
- Wars: Yom Kippur War; Lebanese Civil War; South African Border War; 1982 Lebanon War; Gaza War; Myanmar Civil War; 2025 Cambodia-Thailand border conflict

Production history
- Designer: Soltam Systems
- Designed: 1971–1974
- Manufacturer: Soltam
- Produced: 1975–
- Variants: Soltam M-68

Specifications
- Mass: 9,200 kg (20,300 lb)
- Barrel length: 6.045 m (19 ft 10 in) L/39
- Crew: 8
- Caliber: 155 mm NATO
- Breech: Horizontal sliding block
- Carriage: Split trail
- Elevation: -3° to 52°
- Traverse: ±37.5° from centerline
- Muzzle velocity: 820 m/s (2,700 ft/s)
- Effective firing range: 21 km (13 mi) (NATO standard ammunition); 23.5 km (14.6 mi) (Tampella standard ammunition)
- Maximum firing range: 28.5 km (17.7 mi)

The M-71 is a 155 mm 39 caliber towed howitzer manufactured by Israeli company Soltam Systems.

== Design ==
The weapon was based on the earlier Soltam M-68 and uses the same recoil system, breech and carriage but had a longer gun barrel (39 calibre versus 33 calibre of M-68). It is fitted with a compressed air-driven rammer to permit rapid and easy loading at all angles of elevation as well as having a rechargeable battery mounted on the right trail for auxiliary power. It can fire a 43.7 kilograms (96 lb) high-explosive shell up to a maximum range of 23.5 kilometers (14.6 mi) at a muzzle velocity of 820 meters per second (2,700 ft/s).

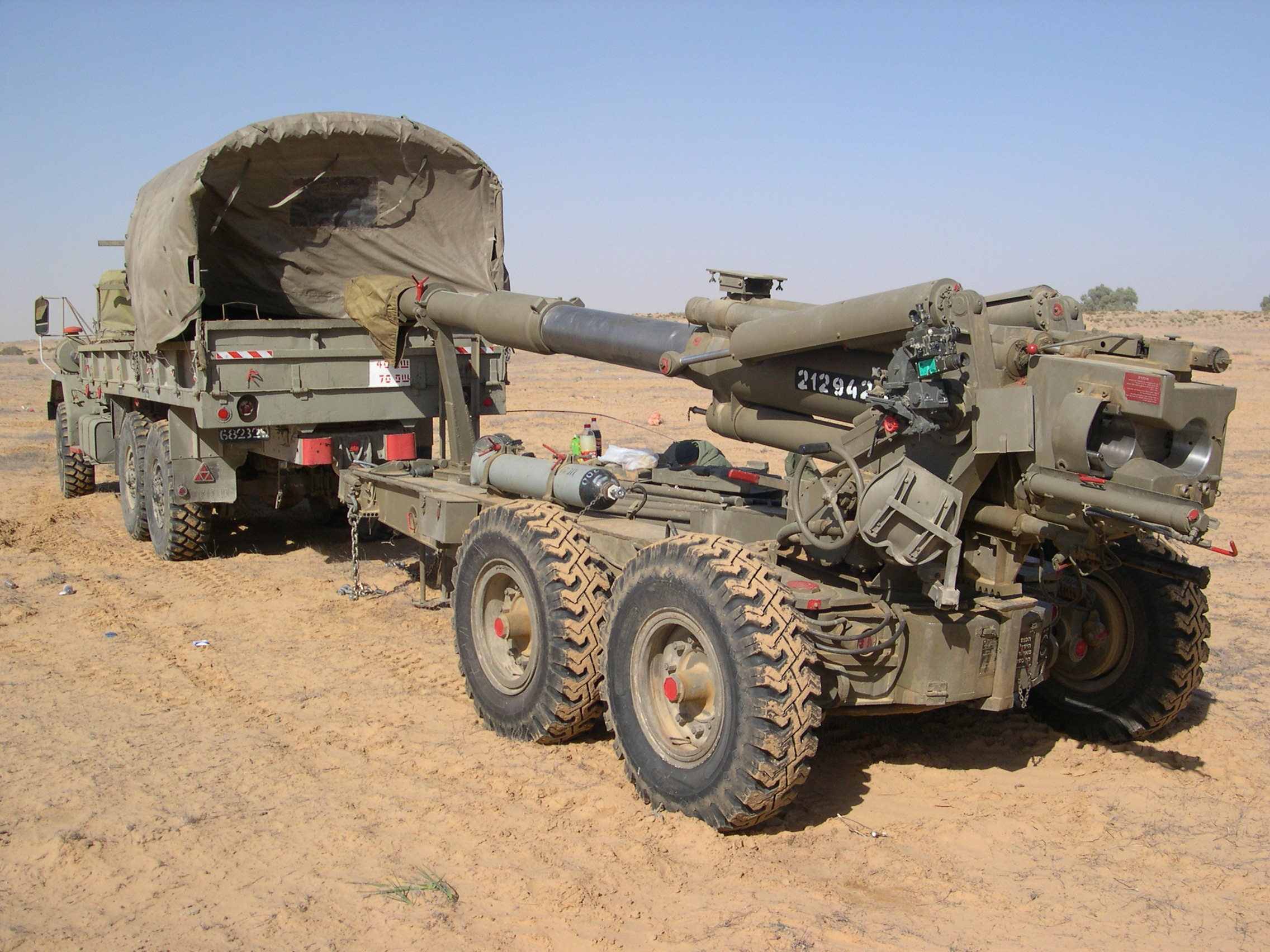
The Soltam M-71 in travel/towing configuration

== Deployment ==
In addition to Israel, this weapon is in service with Chile, Singapore, Thailand, Philippines, South Africa, Slovenia and Myanmar. A version of this weapon was developed to mount on a modified Centurion chassis (M-72), but this vehicle never reached production.

== Operators ==
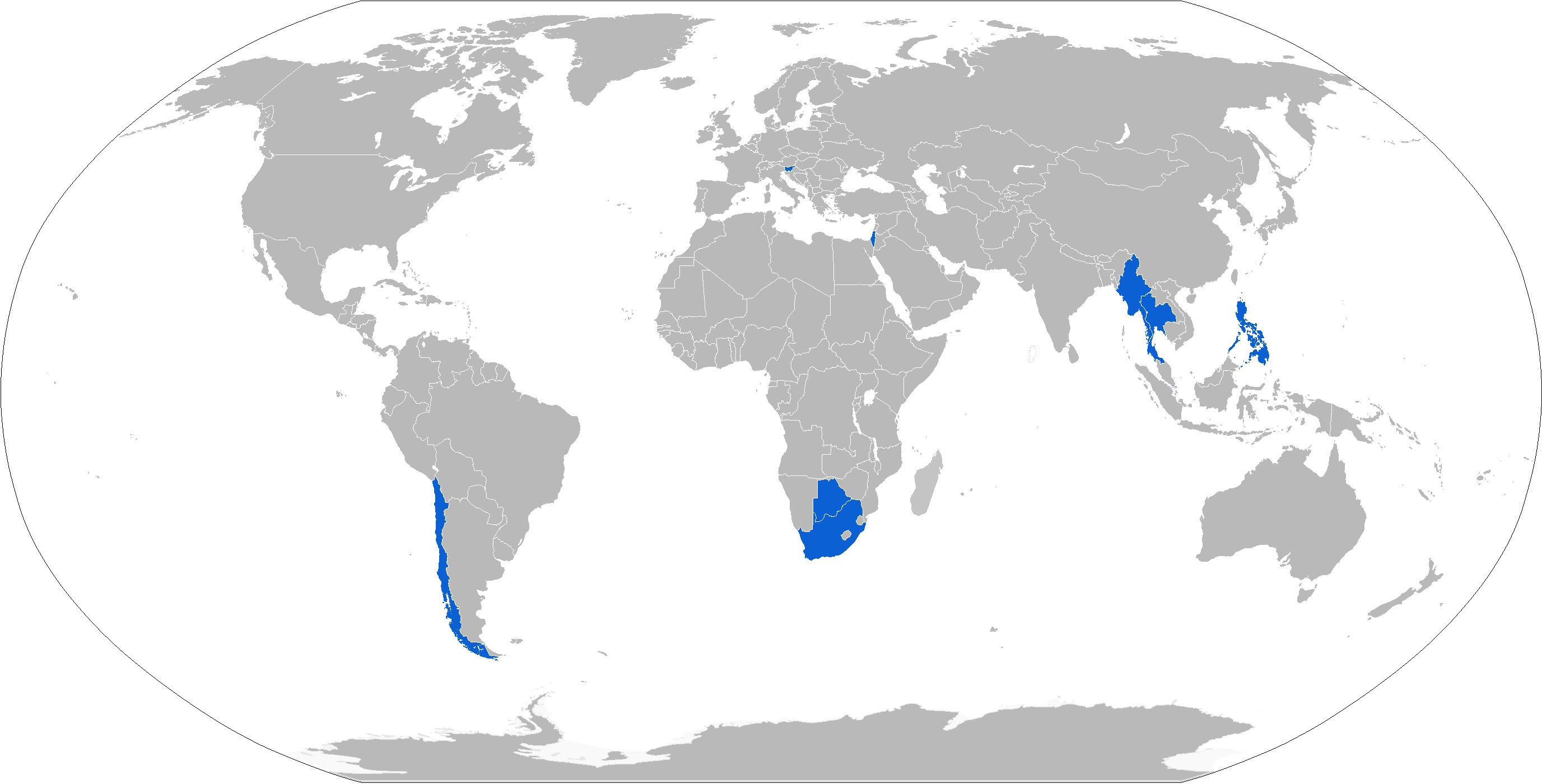
Map of M-71 operators in blue

- Botswana
- Cameroon: 18
- Chile: 60 howitzers used by the Chilean Army, 36 Soltam M-68s acquired in the 1970s later upgraded to Soltam M-71 standard and 24 Soltam M-71 howitzers acquired in the 1980s. 24 designated G-4 howitzers acquired by the Chilean Marine Corps in South Africa in 1992.
- Israel
- Myanmar: 72
- Philippines:
  - Philippine Army: 20
  - Philippine Marine Corps: 6
- Singapore: 13 or 38 - modified to the M-71S standard using less crew + addition of APU.
- Slovenia: 18; M839 variant.
- South Africa: 32; designated G-4.
- Thailand: 32

== See also ==
- 155 K 83 – (Finland)
- FH-88 – (Singapore)
- Soltam M-68 – (Israel)
- ATMOS 2000 – (Israel)
- M777 howitzer – (United Kingdom)
