= Soltam M-68 =

Israeli 155 mm towed howitzer

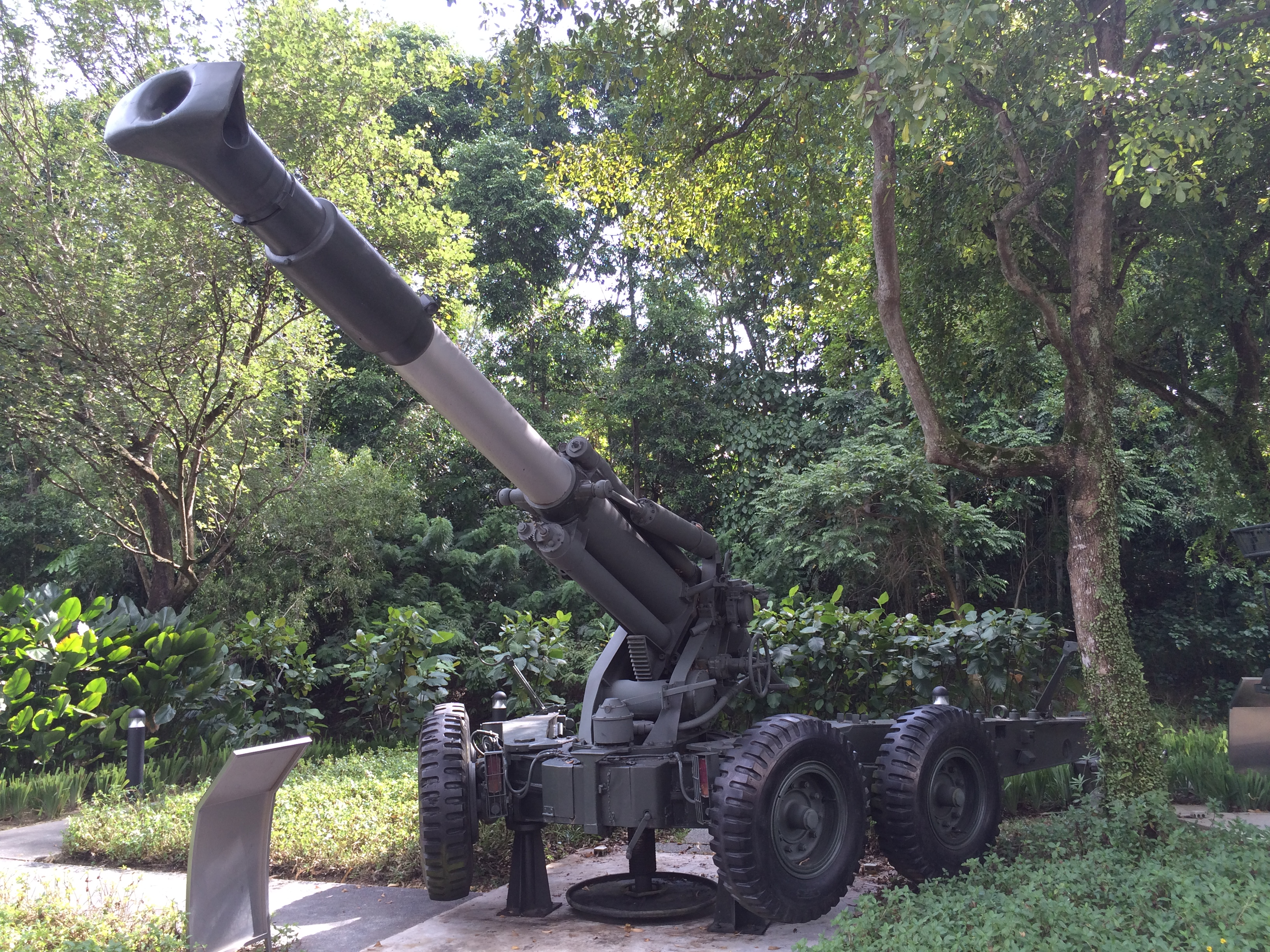
- Retired M-68 howitzer of the Singapore Army
- Type: Howitzer
- Place of origin: Israel

Service history
- Used by: See users

Production history
- Designer: Soltam Systems
- Designed: 1968
- Manufacturer: Soltam
- Produced: 1970
- Variants: Soltam M-71

Specifications
- Mass: 9,500 kg (20,900 lb)
- Length: Traveling: 7.5 m (24 ft 7 in)
- Barrel length: 5.115 m (16 ft 9 in) L/33
- Width: Traveling: 2.6 m (8 ft 6 in)
- Height: Traveling: 2 m (6 ft 7 in)
- Crew: 8
- Shell: Separate loading charge and projectile
- Caliber: 155 mm (6.1 in) NATO
- Breech: Horizontal sliding
- Recoil: Hydro-pneumatic
- Carriage: Split trail
- Elevation: -5°/75°
- Traverse: ±20° from centerline
- Rate of fire: 4-5 rpm
- Muzzle velocity: 253–725 m/s (830–2,380 ft/s) depending on charge
- Maximum firing range: 21.0 km (13.0 mi)

The M-68 was a 155 mm L33 caliber towed gun howitzer manufactured by Soltam Systems of Israel, and used by the Israeli Defense Force.

== Design ==
The M-68 is based on the Finnish designed 122 K 60 and 155 K 68 cannon series, first developed in the mid-1960s by the company Tampella Oy. Twelve Finnish cannons were built between 1970 and 1975, with more guns later built of later designs. These Tampella guns formed the basis for Soltam's production of the M-68 and later "Tampella series" guns. Before the 155 K 68 (Tampella), the 155HX prototype was shipped to Soltam for trials.

The first prototype was completed in 1968 for trials and evaluations by the Israeli Defense Force (IDF), who were satisfied with the performance of the howitzer. Subsequently, an order was placed with Soltam and a production line was initiated in 1970. The gun entered IDF service in time to serve IDF artillery corps during the Yom Kippur War of 1973.

In addition to Israel, the M-68 has also been exported to Singapore and Thailand.

== Description ==
The barrel of the M-68 was fitted with a simple muzzle brake while the recoil mechanism with its two pneumatic cylinder jacks are positioned on the back-end of the barrel.

The gun mount chassis, breech and recoil system were to see further use in the next development of this gun — the Soltam M-71, which has a slightly longer barrel (39 calibers versus 33 calibers of the M-68) and a compressed air-driven rammer to ease loading.

== Variants ==
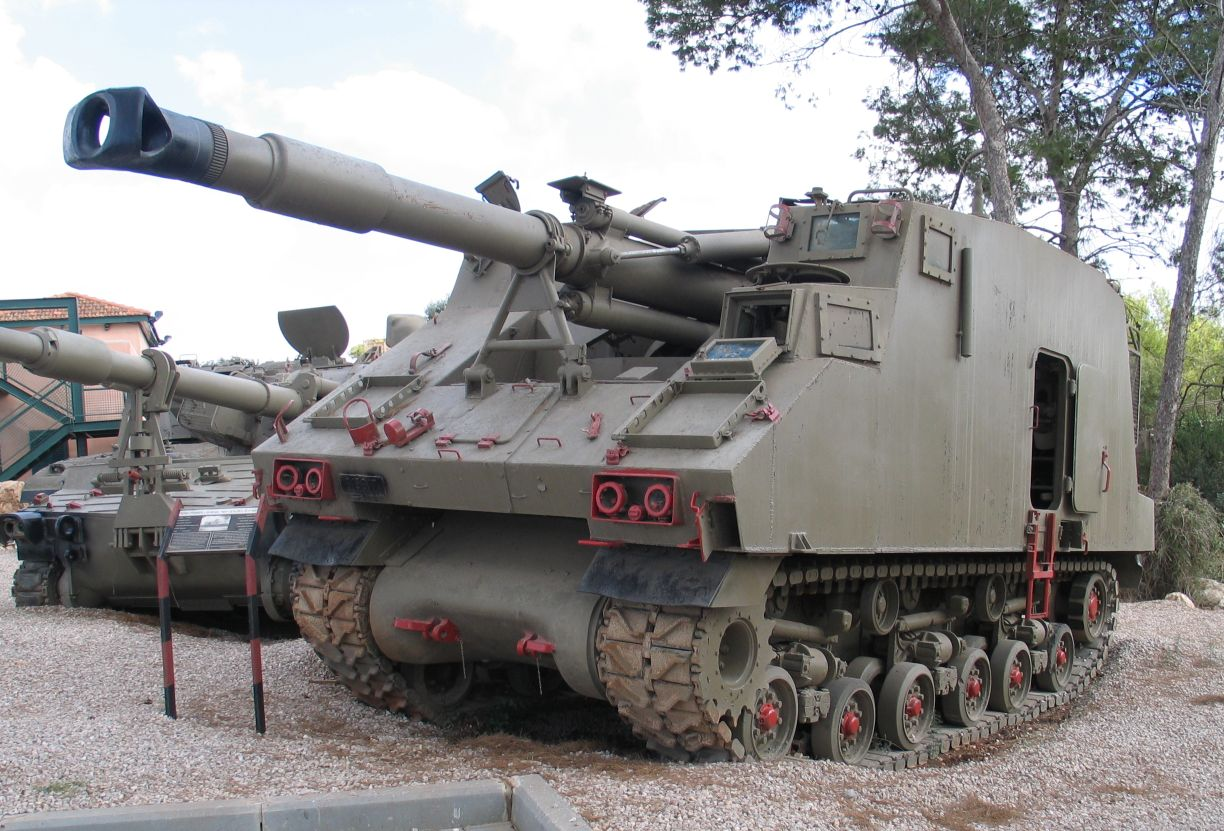
IDF Ro'em self-propelled gun, mounting a L/33 M-68

In the mid-1970s, the Israel Defense Forces engineered an improvised self-propelled gun known as the Ro'em / L-33 to complement the towed M-68. It mated an M-68 to a large, enclosed, turret atop the chassis and drive train of an M4 Sherman tank.

== Operators ==
- Chile: 36 howitzers acquired by the Chilean Army in the late 1970s. Later upgraded to Soltam M-71 standard.
- Israel
- Singapore: 48
- Thailand: 44

== See also ==
- 155 K 83 – (Finland)
- Soltam M-71 – (Israel)
