= List of wheeled self-propelled howitzers =

Howitzers are one of two primary types of field artillery. Historically, howitzers fired a heavy shell in a high-trajectory from a relatively short barrel and their range was limited but they were slightly more mobile than similar size field guns. Since the end of World War II, howitzers have gained longer barrels and hence increased range to become gun-howitzers.

Wheeled based self-propelled howitzer was a common option when motorised vehicles became a standard for armies, but this shifted to tracked based vehicles. Few wheeled solutions were used during the cold war, however, they have regained significance in recent years as a cheaper alternative to tracked platforms.

== Summary list of wheeled self-propelled howitzers ==
Model	Origin	Calibre	Vehicle	Status	Orders
Canon MT-12 sur camion	Algeria	100 mm L/63	6×6 truck	2017	Unknown
Obusier automouvant D-30	Algeria	122 mm L/38	6×6 truck	2017	Unknown
H-155	Bosnia and Herzegovina	155 mm L/52	6×6 truck	In development	Unknown
Jupiter III	Cuba	122 mm L/38	6×6 truck	2006	Unknown
Jupiter IV	Cuba	122 mm L/45	6×6 truck	2006	Unknown
Jupiter V	Cuba	130 mm L/55	6×6 truck	2006	Unknown
CS/AH2, PLL-01 derivative	China; Thailand	105 mm L/52	Not specified yet	In development	0
CS/SH-1, export PCL-09	China	122 mm L/38	6×6 truck	2018	6
PCL-09	China	122 mm L/38	6×6 truck	2010	300
PCL-161	China	122 mm L/38	4×4 truck	2020	300
PCL-171	China	122 mm L/38	6×6 AFV	2020	120
PCL-181	China	155 mm L/52	6×6 truck	2019	630
PLL-09	China	122 mm L/32	8×8 AFV	2009	350
SH-1	China	155 mm L/52	6×6 truck	2009	246
SH-2, export PCL-171	China	122 mm L/38	6×6 AFV	2020	3
SH-5	China	105 mm L/37	6×6 AFV	2020	2
SH-11	China	155 mm L/39	8×8 AFV	Demonstrator	0
SH-15, export PCL-181	China	155 mm L/52	6×6 truck	2021	268
SH-16	China	155 mm L/52	6×6 truck	Prototype	0
DANA	(Czechoslovakia) Czecho-Slovakia	152 mm L/37	8×8 truck	1981	750
Zuzana	Slovakia	155 mm L/45	8×8 truck	1998	28
Zuzana 2	Slovakia	155 mm L/53	8×8 truck	2019	49
EVA	Slovakia	155 mm L/52	6×6 or 8×8 truck	Prototype	0
EVA M2 initially revealed under name BIA	Slovakia	155 mm L/52	6×6 truck	Prototype	0
DITA	Czechia	155 mm L/45	8×8 truck	2024	9
MORANA	Czechia	155 mm L/52	8×8 truck	Prototype	0
M46-1M	Egypt	130 mm L/55	6×6 truck	2023	12 (minimum)
Patria ARVE	Finland	155 mm L/52	8×8 truck	Prototype	0
CAESAr Mk.I	France	155 mm L/52	6×6 or 8×8 truck	2008	441
CAESAr Mk.II	France	155 mm L/52	6×6 truck	2026	79
AGM, Artillery Gun Module	Germany Switzerland	155 mm L/52	6×6 / 8×8 / 10×10 AFV / truck	2027	36
RCH 155	Germany	155 mm L/52	8×8 AFV	2025	170
IFG Mk2 SPH	India	105 mm L/37	6×6 truck	Demonstrator	0
Garuda 105	India	105 mm L/37	4×4 truck	Demonstrator	0
Garuda 105 V2	India	105 mm L/37	4×4 AFV	In development	0
MArG TC-20 ULH	India	155 mm L/39	4×4 truck	2023	72
MGS program ATAGS	India	155 mm L/52	8×8 truck	Prototype	0
MGS program Dhanush	India	155 mm L/52	8×8 truck	Prototype	0
MGS program CAESAr	India; France	155 mm L/52	6×6 truck	Prototype	0
MGS program T5-52	India; South Africa	155 mm L/52	8×8 truck	In development	0
Bhim wheeled SPH	India; South Africa	155 mm L/52	8×8 truck	Cancelled	0
HM-41	Iran	155 mm L/39	6×6 truck	2017	Unknown
Ashura	Iran	155 mm L/39	6×6 truck	Prototype	0
Majnoon / Al-Fao	Iraq; Canada	155 mm L/52; 210 mm L/53	6×6 AFV	Prototypes	0
ATMOS 2000	Israel	155 mm L/39, L52	6×6 or 8×8 truck	2005	89
ATMOS M-46	Israel	130 mm L/52	6×6 truck	2010	6
ATMOS D30 (or Semser)	Israel; Kazakhstan	122 mm L/38	8×8 truck	2008	6
AHS Kryl (licensed ATMOS 2000)	Israel; Poland	155 mm L/52	6×6 truck	Prototype	0
ATROM (licensed ATMOS 2000)	Israel; Romania	155 mm L/52	6×6 truck	Prototype	3
SIGMA 155 Ro'em	Israel	155 mm L/52	10×10 truck	2025	Unknown
SIGMA 155	Israel; Germany	155 mm L/52, L/60	10×10 truck	In development	0
Autocannone da 65/17 su Morris CS8	Italy	65 mm L/17	4×2 truck	Retired	24
Autocannone da 75/27 su FIAT-SPA T.L.37	Italy	75 mm L/27	4×4 truck	Retired	12
90/53 su Breda 52	Italy	90 mm L/53	6×4 truck	Retired	90
90/53 su Lancia 3Ro	Italy	90 mm L/53	4×2 truck	Retired	30
Semovente Ruotato da 90/53 Breda 501	Italy	90 mm L/53	6×6 truck	Prototype, retired	2
Autocannone da 90/53 su SPA Dovunque 41	Italy	90 mm L/53	6×6 truck	Prototype, retired	1
100/17 su Lancia 3Ro	Italy	100 mm L/17	4×2 truck	Retired	16
102/35 su Fiat 634N	Italy	102 mm L/35	4×2 truck	Retired	7
102/35 su SPA 9000	Italy	102 mm L/35	4×2 truck	Retired	135
105/29 AV su SPA 9000C	Italy	105 mm L/29	4×2 truck	Retired	12
Centauro 155/39LW	Italy	155 mm L/39	8×8 AFV	Prototype	0
Type 19	Japan	155 mm L/52	8×8 truck	2018	49
Al-Whash 105	Jordan	105 mm L/32	4×4 AFV	Prototype	Unknown
Rum II	Jordan	155 mm L/39	6×6 truck	In development	Unknown
MOBAT	Netherlands	105 mm L/33	4×4 truck	2004	Unknown
SAMI 8×8 155mm SPH	Saudi Arabia	155 mm L/52	8×8 truck	Prototype	0
Nora B-52	Serbia	155 mm L/52	8×8 truck	2006	150
155 AMGS	Singapore	155 mm L/52	8×8 truck	Prototype	0
G6 Rhino howitzer	South Africa	155 mm L/45, L/52	6×6 AFV	1988	153
T5-52 Condor	South Africa	155 mm L/52	8×8 truck	Prototype	0
Denel T7 LAV III	South Africa; United States	155 mm L/39	8×8 AFV	Demonstrator	0
K9A2	South Korea	155 mm L/52	8×8 truck	In development	0
K105HT	South Korea	105 mm L/23	6×6 truck	2017	850
KLTV 105	South Korea	105 mm L/23	4×4 AFV	Demonstrator	0
SU-12	USSR	76 mm L/16.4	6×6 truck	Retired	299
GHY-02 Khalifa	Sudan	122 mm L/38	6×6 truck	Prototype	0
Archer – FH77BW	Sweden	155 mm L/52	6×6 articulated hauler, 8×8 or 10×10 truck	2016	48
M425 105 mm	Thailand	105 mm L/30	6×6 truck	Demonstrator	Unclear
M758 ATMG (licensed ATMOS 2000)	Thailand; Israel	155 mm L/52	6×6 truck	2014	30
KMO Aselsan	Turkey	155 mm L/52	6×6 truck	Prototype	0
Arpan ASFAT	Turkey	155 mm L/52	8×8 truck	2023	0
Yavuz T-155	Turkey	155 mm L/52	6×6 truck	Prototype	0
2S22 Bohdana	Ukraine	155 mm L/52	6×6 or 8×8 truck	2022	345
Calidus LAHAB	UAE	155 mm L/52	8×8 AFV	Demonstrator	0
Enigma FSV	UAE; UK	155 mm L/39	8×8 AFV	Demonstrator	0
AEC Mk I Gun Carrier	UK	57 mm L/43	4×4 truck	Retired	175
Brutus 155 MHS	USA	155 mm L/39	6×6 truck	Demonstrator	0
Hawkeye 105 MWS	USA	105 mm L/27	4×4 or 6×6 AFV	Prototype	0
T30 HMC	USA	75 mm L/18.4	Half track	Retired	312
T19 HMC	USA	105 mm L/22	Half track	Retired	324
To‘fon	Uzbekistan	155 mm L/52	6×6 truck	Prototype	Unknown
PTH105-VN15	Vietnam	105 mm L/22	6×6 truck	Prototype	Unknown
PTH85-VN18	Vietnam	85 mm L/55	6×6 truck	Prototype	Unknown
PTH 130 (base, Jupiter V)	Vietnam	130 mm L/55	6×6 truck	Prototype	Unknown

Note: a demonstrator intends to demonstrate the viability of a concept, the prototype is a step in the development of a future operational system.

== List of wheeled self-propelled howitzers ==
Model	Designer / Producer	Origin	Image	Calibre	Vehicle	Status	Entered service in	Orders	Clients	Notes and sources
Canon MT-12 sur camion	DFM (Direction des fabrications militaires)	Algeria	—	100 mm L/63	6×6 truck: Mercedes Zetros 2733a	Operational	2017	Unknown	(Algeria) Unknown	Based on MT-12 gun used as artillery piece
Obusier automouvant D-30	DFM (Direction des fabrications militaires)	Algeria	—	122 mm L/38	6×6 truck: Mercedes Zetros 2733a	Operational	2017	Unknown	(Algeria) Unknown	Based on D-30 gun
H-155	BNT TMiH (Factory of Machines and Hydraulics)	Bosnia and Herzegovina	—	155 mm L/52	6×6 truck: FAP 2832	Development program	—	—	(Bosnia and Herzegovina)	Automatic loader with 6 shells
CS/AH2 Derived from PLL-01	Norinco / DIEC / WPC	ChinaThailand	—	105 mm L/52	Not specified yet	Development program 2023	—	—	—	
CS/SH-1 Export variant of PCL-09	Norinco	China	—	122 mm L/38	6×6 truck: Shaanxi SX2150	Operational	2018	6	(Laos) 3 (Rwanda) 3	Sources are unclear on the number of howitzers exported.
PCL-09	Norinco	China		122 mm L/38	6×6 truck: Shaanxi SX2150	Operational	2010	300	(China) 300	
PCL-161	Norinco	China		122 mm L/38	4×4 truck: FAW MV3	Operational	2020	300	(China) 300	The SH-4 is its export variant
PCL-171	Norinco	China		122 mm L/38	6×6 AFV: Dongfeng CTL181A	Operational	2020	120	(China) 120	The SH-2 is its export variant
PCL-181	Norinco	China	—	155 mm L/52	6×6 truck: armoured Shaanxi	Operational	2019	630	(China) 630	The SH-15 is its export variant
PLL-09	Norinco	China	—	122 mm L/32	8×8 AFV: ZBL-08	Operational	2009	350	(China) 350	600 in service according to some sources
SH-1	Norinco	China		155 mm L/52	6×6 truck: Wanshan WS5252	Operational	2009	246	(Cambodia) 6 (Pakistan) 90 (Myanmar) 150	
SH-2 Export variant of PCL-171	Norinco	China	—	122 mm L/38	6×6 AFV: Dongfeng CTL181A	Operational	2020	3	(Nigeria) 3	
SH-5 SH-2 with 105 mm gun	Norinco	China	—	105 mm L/37	6×6 AFV: Dongfeng CTL181A	Operational	2020	2	(Nigeria) 2	
SH-11	Norinco	China	—	155 mm L/39	8×8 AFV: ZBL-08	Demonstrator 2018	—	—	—	Equivalent to the AGM
SH-15 Export variant of PCL-181, and evolution of SH-1	Norinco	China	—	155 mm L/52	6×6 truck: armoured Shaanxi	Operational	2021	268	(Pakistan) 236 (Ethiopia) 32	
SH-16	Norinco	China	—	155 mm L/52	6×6 truck:	Prototype 2024	—	—	—	Turret on truck
Jupiter III	Union de Industrias Militares	Cuba	—	122 mm L/38	6×6 truck: KrAZ-255B	Operational	2006	Unknown	(Cuba) unknown	Based on D-30 gun
Jupiter IV	Union de Industrias Militares	Cuba	—	122 mm L/45	6×6 truck: KrAZ 255B	Operational	2006	Unknown	(Cuba) unknown	Based on A-19 gun, highly modified chassis
Jupiter V	Union de Industrias Militares	Cuba	—	130 mm L/55	6×6 truck: KrAZ-255B	Operational	2006	Unknown	(Cuba) unknown	Based on M-46 gun, highly modified chassis
DANA	Konštrukta Trenčín	(Czechoslovakia) Czecho-Slovakia		152 mm L/37	8×8 truck: Tatra 815	Operational	1981	750	(Czech Republic) 273 (Poland) 111 (Slovakia) 135 (Libya) 80 (R) (Soviet Union) 150 (R) 2nd hand: (Azerbaijan) 36 (Georgia (country)) 47 (Ukraine) 20	All 2nd hand sales with former Czech Army DANA
Zuzana	Konštrukta-Defence	Slovakia		155 mm L/45	8×8 truck: Tatra 815	Operational	1998	28	(Slovakia) 16 (Cyprus) 12	
Zuzana 2	Konštrukta-Defence	Slovakia		155 mm L/53	8×8 truck: Tatra 817	Operational	2019	49	(Slovakia) 25 (Ukraine) 24	
EVA	Konštrukta-Defence	Slovakia		155 mm L/52	6×6 truck: Tatra 810; 8×8 truck: Tatra 817	Prototype 2015	—	—	—	Unveiled in 2015, gun derived from SpGH Zuzana 2. Malaysia interested
SpGH BIA	Konštrukta-Defence	Slovakia	—	155 mm L/52	6×6 truck: Tatra 810	Prototype 2023	—	—	—	Development started in 2021, testing from 2024
DITA	Excalibur Army	Czech Republic		155 mm L/45	8×8 truck: Tatra 817	Prototype 2021	—	—	(Ukraine) 9	Unveiled 2021, strong interest from Taïwan Ordered by Netherlands for Ukraine.
MORANA	Excalibur Army	Czech Republic	—	155 mm L/52	8×8 truck: Tatra 817	Prototype 2022	—	—	—	Unveiled 2022, strong interest from Taïwan
M46-1M	Military Factory 200	Egypt	—	130 mm L/55	6×6 truck: Ural-4320-1911-30; Kraz 63221	Operational	2023	12 (minimum)	(Egypt) 12 (minimum)	Based on M-46 gun, installed on armoured truck
Patria 155K98	Patria Vammas Oy	Finland	(Base vehicle)	155 mm L/52	8×8 truck: Sisu E13TP	Digital design 2015	—	—	—	Based on 155 K 98
CAESAR; Mk. I	Nexter	France		155 mm L/52	6×6 trucks: Renault Sherpa 5; Mercedes Unimog U2450L; 8×8 truck: Tatra 817	Operational	2008	447	(Czech Republic) 62 (Denmark) 19 (R) (Indonesia) 55 (Morocco) 36 (Saudi Arabia) 156 (Thailand) 6 (France) 107 (with 30 donated) (Ukraine) 18 (49 received 2nd hand + 18 ordered)	
CAESAR; Mk. II	Nexter / KNDS	France		155 mm L/52	6×6 truck: Arquus Armis	Development program 2021	2026	155	(Belgium) 28 (France) 109 (Lithuania) 18	
AGM "Artillery Gun Module"	KMW / KNDS	Germany Switzerland		155 mm L/52	6×6 truck: Navistar; 8×8 truck: Iveco Trakker; 10×10 AFV: Mowag Piranha I; On tracks: ASCOD 2; Boxer on tracks	Prototype 2004	—	36	(Switzerland) 36	—
RCH-155 "Remote Controlled Howitzer"	KMW / KNDS	GermanyUnited Kingdom		155 mm L/52	8×8 AFV: Boxer	Development program 2020	2025	36	(Ukraine) 36 (United Kingdom) —	Variant of the Artillery Gun Module that can shoot in movement.
ATI "Artillery Truck Interface"	Rheinmetall	Germany		155 mm L/52, or L/60	10×10 truck: Rheinmetall HX3	Prototype 2021	—	—	—	L/60 gun in development, and system as well.
IFG Mk2 SPH "Indian Field Gun"	Tata Power SED / OFB	India		105 mm L/37	6×6 truck	Demonstrator 2005	—	—	—	Based on IFG, for concept trials
Garuda 105 "Mobile Artillery System"	KSSL (Kalyani Strategic Systems Ltd) /Mandus Group	India	—	105 mm L/37	4×4 truck: Tata LPTA	Demonstrator 2014	—	—	—	Based on IFG
Garuda 105 V2 "Ultra-lightweight artillery"	KSSL (Kalyani Strategic Systems Ltd) / Mandus Group	India	—	105 mm L/37	4×4 AFV: Indian Light Tactical vehicle; Humvee	Development program 2014	—	—	—	Based on IFG Recoil system derived from American Hawkeye 105 mm
MArG TC-20 ULH "Multi-terrain Artillery Gun Ultra Lightweight howitzer"	KSSL (Kalyani Strategic Systems Ltd) / Bharat Forge Ltd	India	—	155 mm L/39	4×4 truck: Ashok Leyland Stallion Mk IV (armoured)	Operational	2023	72	(Armenia) 72	Only 155mm howitzer mounted on a 4×4, $155.5 million deal Armenia
MGS – ATAGS "Mounted Gun System" program	DRDO BEML KSSL (Kalyani Strategic Systems Ltd)	India	—	155 mm L/52	8×8 truck: BEML HMV	Development program 2022	—	—	—	
Dhanush MGS "Mounted Gun System" program	GCF Jalbapur / OFB	India		155 mm L/52	8×8 truck: BEML-Tatra; T815 27ET96 28 300	Development program 2018	—	—	—	
MGS – CAESAR "Mounted Gun System" program	Larsen & Toubro / Nexter	IndiaFrance	—	155 mm L/52	6×6 truck: Ashok Leyland Super Stallion	Prototype 2014	—	—	—	
MGS – T5-52 "Mounted Gun System" program	Tata Power SED / Denel Land Systems	IndiaSouth Africa	—	155 mm L/52	8×8 truck: Tata LPTA 3138	Development program 2023	—	—	—	
Bhim wheeled SPH	DRDO Denel Land Systems	IndiaSouth Africa	—	155 mm L/52	8×8 truck: Tatra	Program cancelled 2000	—	—	—	Based on Denel G6 turret. 200 planned on Arjun tank, and 200 on truck. Successful trials, later cancelled due to corruption.
HM-41	Defense Industries Organization	Iran		155 mm L/39	6×6 truck: MAN HX made under licence by Fath	Operational	2017	Unknown	(Iran) Unknown	
Ashura	Defense Industries Organization	Iran	—	155 mm L/39	6×6 truck: Iveco Trakker	Prototype 2017	—	—	—	CN79 barrel, RM79 recoil buffer, and CG79 mount
Majnoon / Al-Fao	Gerald Bull / Tribiland company	Iraq; Canada		155 mm L/52 / 210 mm L/53	6×6 chassis	Prototype 1989	—	2	(Iraq) 2	
ATMOS 2000	Elbit Systems	Israel		155 mm L/39, or L/52	6×6 truck: Tatra 815-7; 8×8 trucks: Tatra 815-7; Rheinmetall HX2	Operational	2005	89	(Botswana) 5 (Cameroon) 18 (Colombia) 18 (Denmark) 19 (Philippines) 12 (Rwanda) 5 (Uganda) 6 (Zambia) 6	Uganda, first recipient of the ATMOS 2000 in 2005.
ATMOS M-46	Elbit Systems	Israel	—	130 mm L/52	6×6 trucks: Tatra 815-7	Operational	2010	6	(Azerbaijan) 5	
ATMOS D30 or Semser	Soltam Systems	IsraelKazakhstan	—	122 mm L/38	8×8 truck: Kamaz6350	Operational	2008	6	(Kazakhstan) 6	Developed by Soltam, manufactured locally.
AHS Kryl Licensed variant of the ATMOS 2000	Elbit Systems / Huta Stalowa Wola	IsraelPoland		155 mm L/52	6×6 truck: Jelcz 663.32	Prototype 2014	—	—	—	Prototype, no production planned at the moment.
ATROM Licensed variant of the ATMOS 2000	Soltam Systems / Aerostar S.A,	IsraelRomania		155 mm L/52	6×6 truck: ROMAN 26.360 DFAEG	Prototype 2004	—	3	(Romania) 3	
SIGMA 155 Roem	Elbit System	Israel		155 mm L/52	10×10 truck: Oshkosh HEMTT	Development program 2020	2025	Unknown	Unknown	$106 million contract for unknown Asia-Pacific country
SIGMA 155	Elbit System / Rheinmetall	Israel; Germany	—	155 mm L/52, or L/60	10×10 truck: Rheinmetall HX3	Development program 2023	—	—	Unknown	Collaboration on Bundeswehr ZukSysIndF program
Autocannone da 65/17 su Morris CS8	Autofficine del 12° Autoraggruppamento AS	Italy	—	65 mm L/17	4×2: Morris CS8	Retired	1942	24	(Italy) 24	Captured Morris CS8 in 1940–41, used as highly mobile artillery with the Cannone da 65/17 modello 13
Autocannone da 75/27 su FIAT-SPA T.L.37	Fiat S.P.A. Autofficine del 12° Autoraggruppamento AS	Italy	—	75 mm L/27	4×4: FIAT-SPA TL.37	Retired	1942	12	(Italy) 12	Canon 75/27 model 11 installed on truck, developed to improve mobility in the North-African Campaign
90/53 su Breda 52	Società Italiana Ernesto Breda per Costruzioni Meccaniche / Ansaldo-Fossati	Italy		90 mm L/53	6×4 truck: Breda 52	Retired	1941	90	(Italy) 90	Canon 90/53 Model 1939 installed on truck, used as tank hunter and artillery.
90/53 su Lancia 3Ro	Lancia Veicoli Industriali Ansaldo-Fossati	Italy		90 mm L/53	4×2 truck: Breda 52	Retired	1941	30	(Italy) 30	Canon 90/53 Model 1939 installed on truck, used as tank hunter and artillery.
Semovente Ruotato da 90/53 Breda 501	Società Italiana Ernesto Breda per Costruzioni Meccaniche / Ansaldo-Fossati	Italy		90 mm L/53	6×6 truck: Breda 102	Prototype Retired	—	2	(Italy) 2	Canon 90/53 Model 1939
Autocannone da 90/53 su SPA Dovunque 41	S.P.A.,	Italy	—	90 mm L/53	6×6 truck: SPA Dovunque 41	Prototype Retired	—	1	(Italy) 1	Canon 90/53 Model 1939
100/17 su Lancia 3Ro	Autofficine del 12° Autoraggruppamento Africa Settentrionale	Italy		100 mm L/17	4×2 truck: Lancia 3Ro	Retired	1941	16	(Italy) 16	Canon 100/17 Mod. 14
102/35 su Fiat 634N	Fiat / Schneider Ansaldo	Italy		102 mm L/35	4×2: Fiat 634N	Retired	1941	7	(Italy) 7	Anti-air gun102/35 S.A. installed on truck in Tripoli, used by the Regia Marina as anti-tank and howitzers as well
102/35 su SPA 9000	Società Piemontese Automobili / Schneider Ansaldo	Italy		102 mm L/35	4×2 truck: SPA 9000	Retired	1915	135	(Italy) 135	Anti-air gun102/35 S.A. installed on truck and used as howitzer as well
105/29 AV su SPA 9000C	Società Piemontese Automobili / Schneider Ansaldo	Italy	—	105 mm L/29	4×2 truck: SPA 9000	Retired	1916	12	(Italy) 12	Anti-air gun Cannone da 105/28 Modello 1913 installed on truck and used as howitzer as well
Centauro 155/39LW "Porcupine"	Iveco / OTO Melara	Italy		155 mm L/39	8×8 AFV: Centauro	Demonstrator / Program cancelled	—	—	—	Gun used on the demonstrator is the FH-70
Type 19	Japan Steel Works	Japan		155 mm L/52	8×8 truck: Rheinmetall HX2	Operational	2018	200	(Japan) 200	33 in Japanese military in 2020
Al-Whash 105	KADDB	Jordan	—	105 mm L/32	4×4 AFV: Al-Wahsh AFV	Prototype 2016	—	Unknown	(Jordan) Unknown	Al Wahsh based on Tatra chassis, equipped with a M102 towed howitzer.
Rum II	KADDB	Jordan	—	155 mm L/39	6×6 truck: DAF	Development program 2018	—	—	—	
MOBAT "Mobile Artillery"	RDM Technology	Netherlands	—	105 mm L/33	4×4 truck: DAF YA 4440	Operational	—	—	—	Based on M101 towed howitzer, ordered in 1996
SAMI 8×8 155mm SPH	Saudi Arabian Military Industries (SAMI)	Saudi Arabia	—	155 mm L/52	8×8 truck: Tatra T815	Development program 2024	—	—	—	
155 AMGS "Advanced Mobile Gun System"	ST Kinetics	Singapore	—	155 mm L/52	8×8 truck	Digital design 2018	—	—	—	Based on FH-2000.
G6 Rhino howitzer	Denel Land Systems / Land Systems OMC	South Africa	—	155 mm L/45, or L/52	6×6 chassis: Land Systems OMC vehicle	Operational	1988	153	(Oman) 24 (South Africa) 51 (United Arab Emirates) 78	
T5-52	Denel Land Systems	South Africa	—	155 mm L/52	8×8 truck: Tatra T815	Prototype 2002	—	—	—	
Denel T7 (LSPH) "LAV III Self-Propelled Howitzer"	Denel Land Systems / General Dynamic Systems / Rheinmetall Denel Munitions	South Africa; United States		155 mm L/39	8×8 AFV: LAV III; Stryker	Demonstrator 1999	—	—	—	
K105HT	Hanwha Techwin	South Korea		105 mm L/23	6×6 truck: KM500 (improved M809, 5-ton variant)	Operational	2017	850	(South Korea) 850	M101A1 gun
KLTV 105	Hyundai WIA	South Korea	—	105 mm L/23	4×4 AFV: KLTV	Demonstrator 2024	—	—	—	
K9A2	South Korea	South Korea	—	155 mm L/58	8×8 truck: Doosan DST high mobility truck system	In development 2024	—	—	—	
SU-12 "СУ-12"	Leningrad Kirov Plant / Kirov Plant	USSR		76 mm L/16.4	6×6 truck: GAZ-AAA	Retired	1934	299	(Soviet Union) 299	Based on 76 mm regimental gun M1927 (200 experimental + 99 for training)
GHY-02 Khalifa	Military Industry Corporation	Sudan	—	122 mm L/38	6×6 truck: KamAZ-43118	Prototype 2015	—	—	—	Based on D-30 gun, with Karary IGZ01 fire control system
Archer – FH77BW	BAE Systems	Sweden		155 mm L/52	6×6 articulated hauler: Volvo A30D	Operational	2016	48	(Sweden) 48 (-22 sold / transferred) 2nd hand: (United Kingdom) 14 (Ukraine) 8	All 2nd hand sales with Swedish reserve Archer.
Archer – FH77BW	BAE Systems	Sweden	(Base vehicle)	155 mm L/52	8×8 truck: Rheinmetall HX2 8x8	Development program 2020	2024	48	(Sweden) 48	Trial phase in 2023, potential sales to Switzerland, UK.
M425	DIEC / WPC	Thailand	—	105 mm L/30	6×6 truck: M35	Demonstrator 2010	Unclear	Unclear	(Thailand) Unclear	M425 towed canon (M101 carriage with LG1 gun) mounted on a truck to test the concept.
M758 ATMG Licensed variant of the ATMOS 2000	Elbit Systems / DIEC / WPC	ThailandIsrael	—	155 mm L/52	6×6 truck: Tatra 815-7	Operational	2014	36	(Thailand) 36	Local production 24 for the Royal Thal Army, 12 for the Royal Thai Marine Corps
Arpan	ASFAT / Aselsan / MKE / BMC	Turkey	—	155 mm L/52	8×8 truck: BMC	Operational	2023	Unclear	(Turkey) Unclear	
KMO "Kamyona Monteli Obus"	Aselsan	Turkey	—	155 mm L/52	6×6 truck: BMC 10-tons (based on MAN truck)	Prototype 2017 / Program cancelled	—	—	—	
Yavuz T-155	MKE	Turkey	—	155 mm L/52	6×6 truck: BMC 10-tons (based on MAN truck)	Prototype 2017	—	—	—	18 to be sold to Malaysia, but tender investigated
2S22 Bohdana	Kramatorsk Heavy Duty Machine Tool Plant	Ukraine		155 mm L/52	6×6 truck: KrAZ-6322; MAZ-6317; 8×8 truck: Tatra 815-7	Operational	2022	>30	(Ukraine) >30	Entered service during the war.
LAHAB	Calidus	United Arab Emirates	—	155 mm L/52	8×8 AFV: WAHASH 8×8	Demonstrator 2025	—	—	—	
Enigma – FSV "Fire Support Vehicle"	Emirates Defense Technology / BAE Systems	United Arab Emirates; United Kingdom	—	155 mm L/39	8×8 AFV: Enigma	Demonstrator 2016	—	—	—	M777 flipping backwarrds
AEC Mk I Gun Carrier Known as "Deacon"	AEC / Park Royal Vehicles	United Kingdom		57 mm L/43	4×4 truck: AEC Matador	Retired	1942	175	(United Kingdom) 175	Equipped with QF 6-pounder gun
Brutus 155 MHS "Hawkeye – Mobile Howitzer System"	Mandus Group / AM General	United States		155 mm L/39	6×6 truck: FMTV	Demonstrator 2016	—	—	—	Based on M776 canon tube
Hawkeye 105 MWS "Hawkeye – Mobile Weapon System"	Mandus Group / AM General	United States		105 mm L/27	4×4 AFV: Humvee 2-CT (AM General); Sherpa Light (from MACK); Ford F250; 6×6 AFV: Coyote TSV	Prototype 2018	—	—	—	Based on M20A1 gun
T30 HMC "Howitzer Motor Carriage"	Ordnance Department / White Motor Company	United States		75 mm L/18.4	Half track: M3	Retired	1942	312	(United States) 312 (France) some received 2nd hand	Equipped with 75 mm Pack Howitzer M1
T19 HMC "Howitzer Motor Carriage"	Ordnance Department / Diamond T	United States		105 mm L/22	Half track: M3	Retired	1942	324	(United States) 324	Equipped with M2A1 gun
To‘fon	Defense Industry Corporation	Uzbekistan	—	155 mm L/52	6×6 truck:	Prototype 2025	—	—	—	
PTH105-VN15	Vietnamese Union Enterprise	Vietnam	—	105 mm L/22	6×6 truck: Ural-375D	Prototype 2014	Unknown	Unknown	(Vietnam) unknown	Exists in 3 variants, M1, M2 and M3
PTH85-VN18	Vietnamese Union Enterprise / Z751 factory	Vietnam	—	85 mm L/55	6×6 truck: Ural-43206	Prototype 2018	Unknown	Unknown	(Vietnam) unknown	
PTH 130 Based on Jupiter V (Cuba)	Vietnamese Union Enterprise / Z751 factory	Vietnam	—	130 mm L/55	6×6 truck: KrAZ-255B	Prototype 2021	Unknown	Unknown	(Vietnam) unknown	Based on M-46 gun

(R) = Removed from service from this army

== See also ==
- List of howitzers
