= Patria ARVE =

- Type: Wheeled self-propelled howitzer
- Place of origin: Finland

Production history
- Designer: Patria

Specifications (See technical data)
- Caliber: 155 mm
- Main armament: 155 GH 52 APU field gun

The Patria ARVE is a self-propelled howitzer that is based on the Patria 155 GH 52 APU field gun (known as the 155 K 98 in the Finnish Army) and the SISU E13TP all terrain 8×8 truck.

== Development ==
An initial digital designed was made public in 2015. One of the mentioned objective with this project was to ensure a domestic capacity to produce howitzers.

In 2017, Finland selected the K9 Thunder as its new self-propelled howitzer, and the project became dormant. But following the 2022 Russian invasion of Ukraine, needs to quickly modernise the indirect fire capabilities arose. Among the systems that need to be replaced are the field guns, especially the old soviet guns. The results of the Nexter CAESAR in the Ukraine war confirmed that this type of systems would be a good solution to replace the field guns, an economical and effective system, complementary to the K9 Thunder.

In 2024, the development of the project by Patria advanced with the intent to make a prototype. The first prototype was unveiled in 2025 at Arctic Event 2025, and its name was unveiled, the Patria ARVE (ARtillery on VEhicle).

In June 2025, Patria announced having fired the system for the first time. And the performances were as expected, even with a maximum of charges.

== Design ==
=== Prototype ===
The prototype takes the existing Patria 155 GH 52 APU gun, and is installed on the chassis of the SISU E13TP with an added hydraulic stabiliser installed at the rear of the vehicle. The spade is lowered before firing to transfer most of the recoil into the ground.

==== Gun ====
The gun barrel is equipped with a single-chamber muzzle brake. For the breach and recoil, it uses a Horizontal semi-automatic sliding block and hydro-pneumatic recoil system.

==== Ammunition ====
The system can transport 24 complete ammunition. The shells can weigh from 43 kg (95 lb) to 47 kg (104 lb).

==== Capabilities ====
The prototype can shoot its first round 90 seconds after stopping, and it is ready to leave 45 seconds after the last round is shot. The firing rate of the system is:

- 3 rounds in the first 15 seconds
- 8 rounds per minute at its maximum rate of fire
- 2 rounds per minute at a sustained rate

=== Planned improvements ===
The prototype will enable to test the concept and if the architecture of the system is sound. Depending on the cost target and the expectations of the potential clients, the original gun design might see some changes, such as an electrical laying system.

=== Technical data ===
The detailed specifications and capabilities of the current version are summarised in the following table.

Parameters	Sisu E13TP (8×8)
	Vehicle characteristics
Length	11.5 m (38 ft)
Width	2.6 m (8.5 ft)
Height	3.5 m (11 ft)
Mass	28.0 t (61,700 lb)
	Power train
Engine power	500 hp (370 kW)
Fuel capacity	400 L (88 imp gal; 110 US gal)
Power / mass ratio	13.2 kW/t (17.9 PS/t)
Drivetrain	Automatic 6-speed Allison HD4500SP with a torque converter; Steyr VG 2000/300 2-step reduction gear with longitudinal, lockable differential between the front and rear axles.
	Vehicle performance
Max speed	100 km/h (62 mph)
Cruising range	600 km (370 mi)
	Weapon system
Primary weapon	Gun-howitzer 155 mm 155 GH 52 APU L/52
Elevation	−3° to +60°
Traverse	±35° from centreline
Projectile magazine	24 projectiles
Sights	An optical panoramic periscopic dial sight, and a telescopic direct fire sight.
Crew	6 personnel
	Weapon performance
Rate of fire	Multiple rounds simultaneous impact (MRSI) capable: 3 rounds in the first 15 seconds; 8 rounds per minute at its maximum rate of fire; 2 rounds per minute at a sustained rate
Effective firing range	28 km (17 mi)—42 km (26 mi): 28 km (17 mi) (conventional high-explosive fragmentation shell); 42 km (26 mi) (base bleed shell)
	Protection
Armor	Cabin ballistic protection: STANAG 4569 level 2STANAG 4569; Cabin mine protection: STANAG 4569 level 2a.
CBRN	Pressurised cabin with protection against gases available.

== See also ==
- List of wheeled self-propelled howitzers
- ATMOS 2000 – 155 mm wheeled SPH on 6×6 and 8×8 truck, Israeli system.
  - AHS Kryl – 155 mm SPH on 6×6 truck, Polish derivative of ATMOS 2000
  - ATROM – 155 mm SPH on 6×6 truck, Romanian derivative of ATMOS 2000
- А-222 “Bereg – 130 mm coastal artillery system on 8×8 truck, Russian system
- CAESAr – 155 mm wheeled SPH on 6×6 and 8×8 truck, French system
- DANA – 152 mm wheeled SPH on 8×8 truck, Czech system
- DITA and MORANA – 155 mm wheeled SPH on 8×8 truck, Czech system
- G6 Rhino – 155 mm wheeled SPH on 6×6 truck, South African system
- PCL-09 – 122 mm wheeled SPH on 6×6 truck, Chinese system
- PCL-161 – 122 mm wheeled SPH on 4×4 truck, Chinese system
- PCL-171 – 122 mm wheeled SPH on 6×6 AFV (Dongfeng CTL181A), Chinese system
- PCL-181 – 155 mm wheeled SPH on 6×6 truck, Chinese system
  - SH-15 – 155 mm wheeled SPH on 6×6 truck, Chinese system for export, derived from PCL-181
- PLL-09 – 122 mm wheeled SPH on 8×8 AFV (ZBL-08), Chinese system
- SH-1 – 155 mm wheeled SPH on 6×6 truck, Chinese system for export
- RCH-155 – German 155 mm SPH available on
  - 8×8 wheeled AFV (Boxer) and 10×10 wheeled AFV (Piranha IV, prototype)
  - tracked AFV (Donar on ASCOD 2, prototypes, or RCH-155 Boxer module on tracked Boxer)
  - possible on 6×6 and 8×8 trucks (prototypes)
- Type 19 – 155 mm wheeled SPH on 8×8 truck, Japanese system
- Zuzana and Zuzana 2 – 155 mm wheeled SPH on 8×8 truck, Slovak system
- 2S22 Bohdana – 155 mm wheeled SPH on 6×6 and 8×8 trucks, Ukrainian system
