= 102/35 su Fiat 634N =

102/35 on Fiat 634N
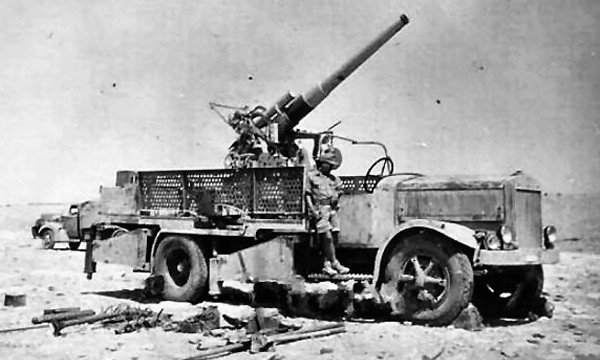
- 102/35 on Fiat 634N damaged and abandoned, captured by Britain
- Type: Anti aircraft truck
- Place of origin: Italy

Service history
- In service: 1941-1942
- Wars: Second World War

Production history
- Manufacturer: Fiat
- Produced: 1941
- No. built: 7 units

Specifications
- Mass: 6.2 t
- Length: 7.6 m
- Width: 2.3 m
- Height: 3.25 m
- Crew: 8
- Caliber: 102mm
- Elevation: 90°
- Traverse: 360°
- Main armament: 102/35 S. 1914-15
- Engine: Fiat 355C with 6 cylinders inline, 8355 cm^{3} 80 hp (60 kW) @ 1900rpm
- Power/weight: 12.9 hp/t
- Transmission: 4 × 2
- Fuel capacity: 150 L
- Operational range: 420 km
- Maximum speed: 41 km/h

The 102/35 on Fiat 634N was an anti aircraft truck used by the Regia Marina during the Second World War.

== History ==
The 102/35 on SPA 9000, produced since 1914 and used during the Great War, was one of first Italian gun trucks, obtained from the installation on a truck of a naval gun, designed for destroyers. After the end of the First World War, the trucks were disassembled and the guns were returned to Regia Marina. In 1941 the Fiat Tripoli plant set up seven gun trucks on the chassis of the Fiat 634 N for the Regia Marina, using 102/35 S. 1914-15 guns taken from the defenses of Benghazi. With these means two mobile batteries were created, the 1st and 6th, served by personnel of the Maritime Artillery Militia of the Blackshirts, together with some old naval guns of type 76/30 already installed on the 634N trucks. The 1st Battery and a section of the 6th were joined to the 132nd Armoured Division Ariete, while section B of the 6th was subordinated to the 102nd Motorised Division Trento.

In the last months of 1941 they participated in several battles; on November 19 it was used during the first battle of Bir el Gobi, destroying at least 15 British tanks from a long distance. All 102/35 trucks were lost due to battle damage or accidents by the end of the same year. In addition to the counter-tank actions, served by the fire stations, they carried out long-range bombardments and anti-aircraft attacks with good results. As this was an "emergency" solution, its defects soon became apparent, such as the excessively high silhouette, the deterioration of the off-road performance of the truck and the tendency of some mechanical parts to wear off. None of these gun trucks survived the North African campaign.

== Technology ==
The cannon 102/35 S. 1914-15 was installed on the truck bed using two different types of mounts: the OTO Mod. 33 on the first two specimens and the Vickers-Terni Mod. 25 mount on the others. The modifications of the vehicle, on the other hand, consisted in the "cutting" of the closed cabin, replaced by a canvas cover, and in the installation of four manually operated jacks; the rear body was replaced by a shooting platform on which the mount swung 360°; this platform could be expanded to battery placement through the 90° pivot of the two metal side rails, which thus increased the floor space for the crew. The latter are transported on uncovered benches located at the rear end of the platform, between the two stores of ready-to-use shells.
