= Sisu E13TP =

Finnish military truck

Sisu E13TP and E15TP
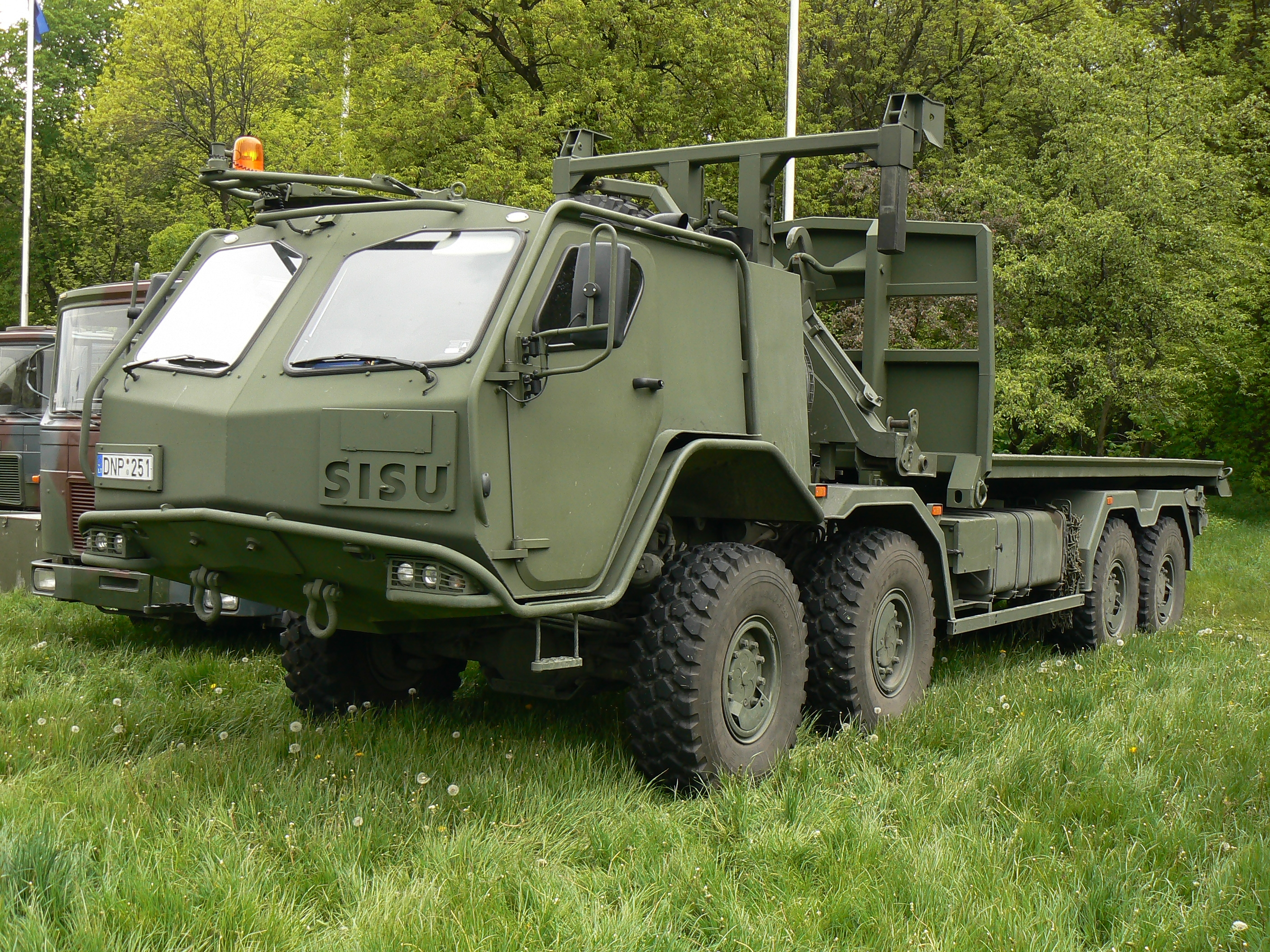
- Type: High Mobility Terrain Vehicle (HMTV)
- Place of origin: Finland

Service history
- Used by: see operators

Production history
- Manufacturer: Sisu Defence Oy, Raseborg
- Variants: 8×8; 10×10; (6×6 proposed)

Specifications
- Mass: 18,000 kg (40,000 lb)
- Length: 9,500 mm (370 in)
- Width: 2,500 mm (98 in)
- Height: 2,700 mm (110 in)
- Crew: 1+1
- Armour: STANAG 4569
- Engine: Caterpillar turbo-diesel E13TP: Cat C13, 332 kW (445 hp); E15TP: Cat C15, 410 kW (550 hp)
- Payload capacity: E13TP: 20,000 kg (44,000 lb); E15TP: 25,000 kg (55,000 lb)
- Transmission: Allison automatic transmission; Steyr reduction gear
- Operational range: 900 km
- Maximum speed: 90 km/h

Sisu E13TP is a military terrain truck produced by the Finnish heavy vehicle producer Sisu Defence. The vehicle was introduced in 2005 and the first vehicles were delivered in 2007. E13TP is available in layouts 6×6 and 8×8. The stronger variant E15TP is with 10×10 layout.

The primary military applications are hook loader, radar carrier, missile vehicle, recovery vehicle and bridging vehicle. Some civil applications are produced for oil fields and rescue purposes in particular.

== Development ==
Sisu E13TP is developed for military and peacekeeping missions in particular. It is heavily based on the preceding E11T model; the main differences are bigger engine displacement, armoured cabin and upgraded gearbox. The Finnish Defence Forces participated at the development work. In order to lower the operating costs and ensure availability of spares, large amount of the parts are standard components.

In March 2004 Lithuania joined an alliance to support NATO in remote peacekeeping and humanitarian missions, which it dedicated to a specific unit in the Armed Forces. Lithuania raised a tender for Level 2 protected armoured lorries at the end of 2005. Eight manufacturers from United States and Europe took part in the tender process; the three shortlisted producers were Iveco, MAN and Sisu. Eventually, in the same December it was announced Sisu became selected. Lithuanian Armed Forces ordered 24 vehicles which were delivered between 2007–2009; the first units entered in service in 2008. The value of the order was €20M. The deal was followed by further E13TP orders.

A 10×10-driven variant E15TP with a more powerful engine was introduced in Eurosatory 2006 exhibition.

== Technical data ==
=== Engine ===
E13TP is powered by Caterpillar C13 turbo-diesel engine. The six-in-line, 12.5-litre diesel has bore of 130 mm and stroke of 157 mm. It is equipped with a cross-flow breathing cylinder head. The engine weights 1 187 kg. Its output is 332 kW and the maximum torque is 2270 Nm /1200 1/min. The engine includes heaters for lubricating oil, cooling water and cabin.

E15TP is equipped with a stronger Caterpillar engine, C15. Also this model is a six-in-line turbocharged diesel engine. Its displacement is 15.2 litres, bore 137 mm and stroke 171 mm. The compression ratio is 17:1. The engine produces maximum output of 410 kW /1900 1/min and torque 2 508 Nm /1200–1500 1/min.

=== Transmission ===
The gearbox used in E13TP 8×8 models is an automatic 6-speed Allison HD4500SP with a torque converter. The Steyr VG 2000/300 2-step reduction gear contains longitudinal, lockable differential between the front and rear axles. All axles are driven and produced by Sisu Axles. CTI system is available as an option.

The E15TP 10×10 is equipped with a 7-speed automatic Allison. In this variant all the axles are with lockable differentials and there are four interaxle locks; the first, second and last axle are steering. Also these axles come from Sisu Axles.

=== Cabin and armour ===
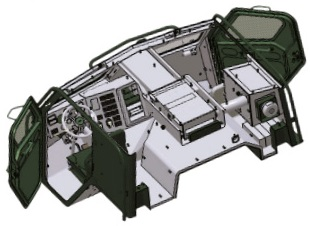
Armoured cabin used on E13TP and E15TP.

The cabin contains seating for driver and one passenger. Mine, ballistic and NBC protections are optional; the mine and ballistic protection can be also mounted afterwards. Cabin and engine mine protection is installed on the chassis under the cabin and on the floor in accordance with STANAG 4569 levels 3a and 3b against anti-tank mine blasts up to 6 kg. Armoured steel doors provide STANAG 4569 level 1 ballistic protection; levels 2 and 3 are reached with optional composite doors. The cabin is produced from Ruukki Ramor steel and fitted with pressurised NBC protection system.

=== Chassis ===
The chassis is mine-protected; the pneumatic, electric and fuel systems are placed in protected areas, for example behind the cabin. The frame is designed to withstand high torsional stress.

=== Superstructures ===
The modular design enables a wide variety of superstructures and applications, such as hook loader and radar or launcher carrier. An application with NASAMS air defence system was introduced in Norway in June 2010. A firefighting and rescue vehicle with a decouplable 10-ton extinguishing container was presented in 2012. The E15TP is fitted with 26-metre MLC70 Leguan armored rapid bridge and launching system produced by the German company KMW.

== Applications ==
- Logistics truck
- Patria ARVE self-propelled-howitzer
- Sisu E13 TP recovery vehicle (EMPL recovery module)
- Sisu E13 TP air defence (NASAMS launcher, radar transporter)
- Sisu E15 TP-L, Leguan bridge layer

== Characteristics ==
On firm, dry ground surface, the vehicle is capable of climbing 60% grades uphill and downhill forward and by reversing. Transit uphill start is possible on this gradient with the help of an interlocking transmission. The nominal fording depth is 0.8 m, but a 1.2-metre depth is achievable with preparation. The angles of approach and departure are 35°. Maximum side slope is 30% and vertical step about 0.6 metres. The terrain capability is further enhanced by a front-mounted hydraulic 150-kN self-recovery winch. The climatic operation range is from -55 °C to +50 °C.

Sisu E13TP is air-transportable by Hercules C-130 aircraft, suitable for rail transport (fulfills STANAG 2468 requirements), and is transportable by sea transport.

== Operators ==
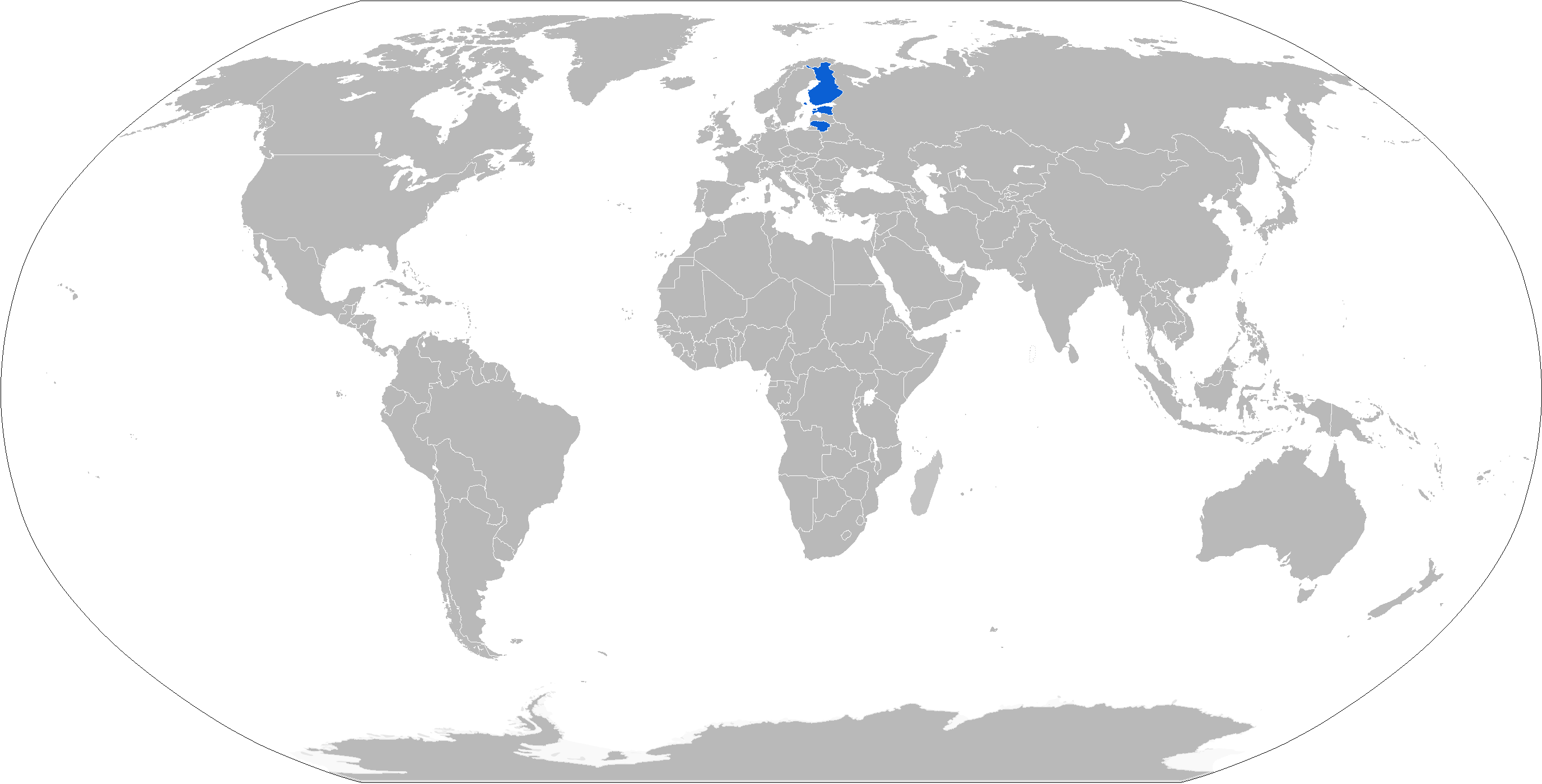
Map with E13TP operators in blue

=== Current applications ===
Estonia

The first 8×8 driven E13TP's were delivered to Estonian Defence Forces in 2012. The vehicles serve as a platform for the Air Force's Ground Master 403 air defence radar system.

Finland

The Finnish Defence Forces ordered 72 units of 8×8 driven E13TPs, which entered in service in 2010, and 9 units of 10×10 driven E15TP's, which were delivered 2007–2009. 20 E13TP vehicles were delivered to the Finnish Rapid Deployment Forces and they have been used in NATO led ISAF operation in Afghanistan and UNIFIL operation in Lebanon. 12 E13TP's are equipped with air surveillance radar systems; they entered in service in 2011. The E15TP's are fitted with MLC70 Leguan bridging system.

Lithuania

Lithuanian Armed Forces received 24 8×8 E13TP vehicles from 2007 to 2009. After further orders, the total number had reached 50 units by 2011.

=== Civilian operators ===
Anhui JAC International, China

A Sisu E13TP 8×8 rescue vehicle was delivered to Chinese Anhui JAC International in June 2014 as a part of a larger project.

OMV Petrom, Romania

Sisu Auto will deliver total 70 oil field service vehicles to Romanian oil company OMV Petrom. The contract includes both 8×8 and 10×10 driven variants. The vehicles are delivered with superstructures fitted by German company Koller GmbH. The first deliveries are scheduled to the late 2014 and serial production is planned to begin in 2015.

== Gallery ==
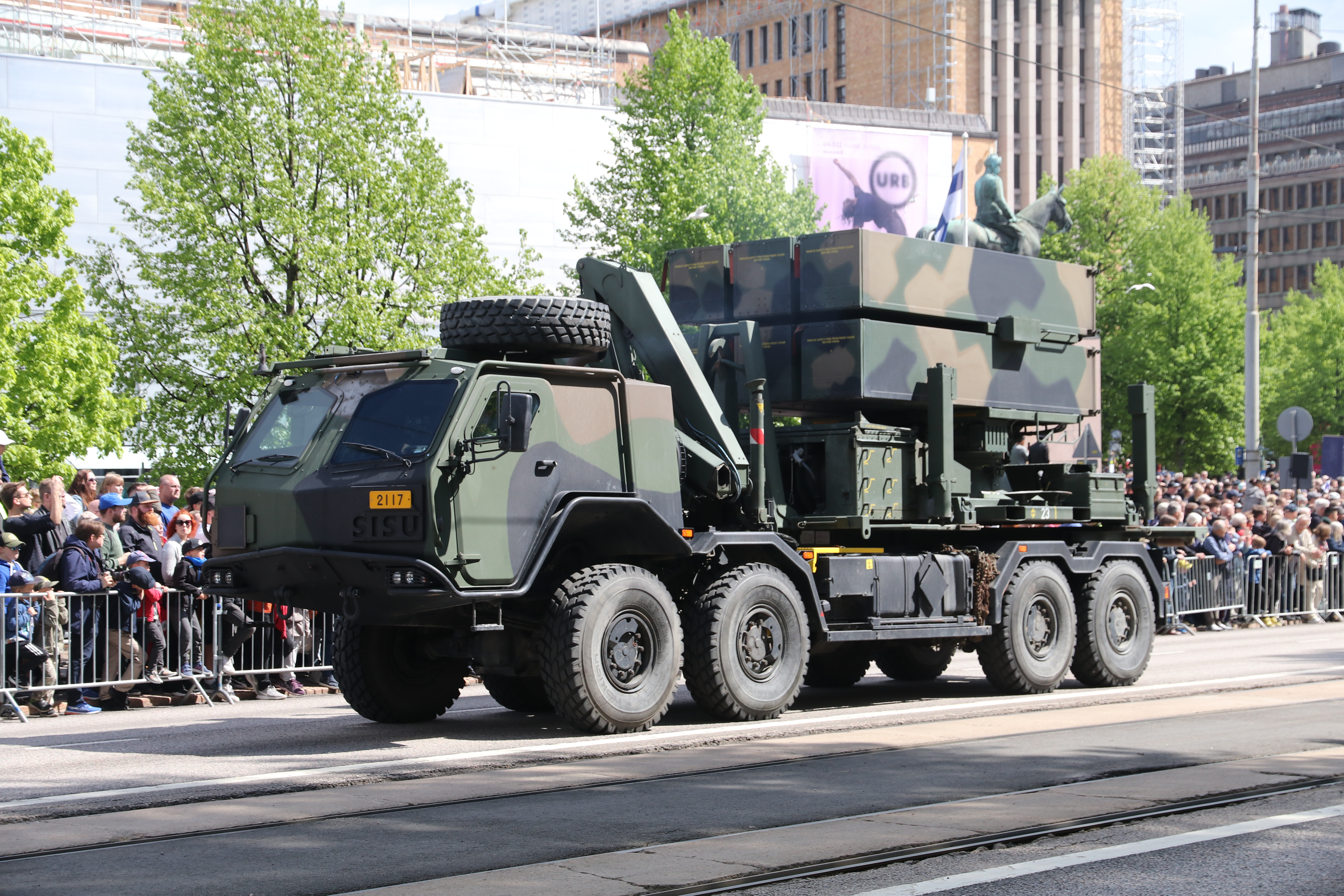
NASAMS on Finnish Defence Forces 2022 flag day parade

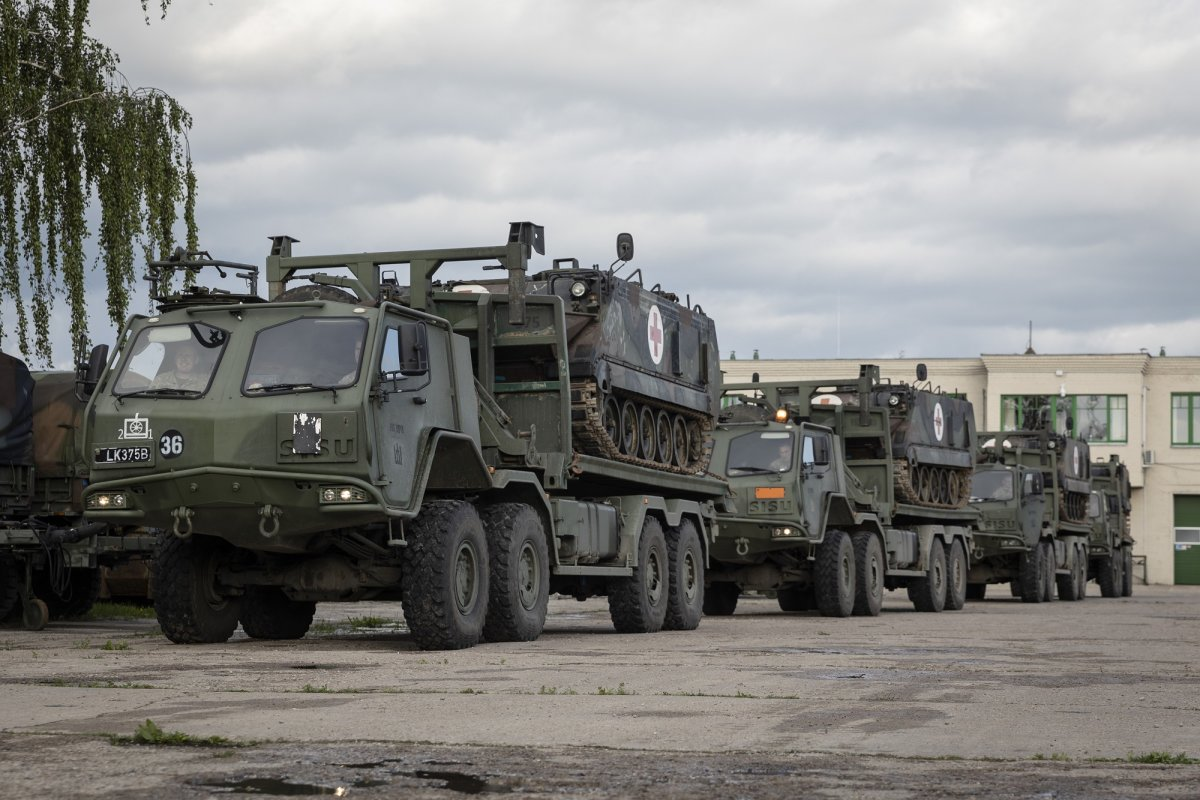
Lithuanian trucks transporting M113s for Ukraine due to the 2022 Russian invasion
