= SU-12 =

SU-12 self-propelled gun battery
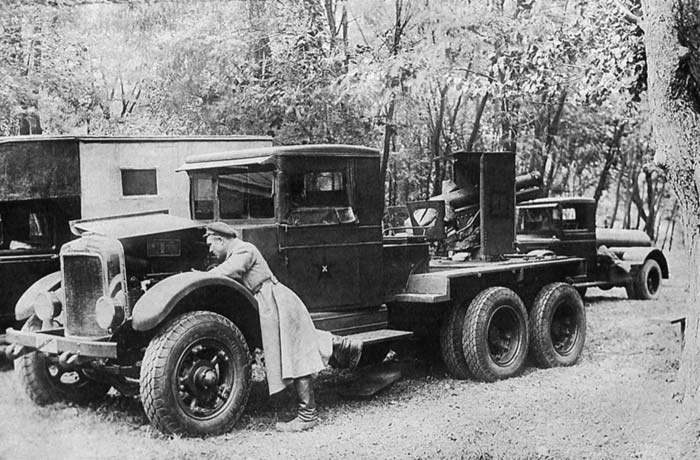
- SU-12 (based on а Moreland truck) after maneuvers. Kiev Military District, 45th Mechanized Corps. Autumn 1933.
- Place of origin: Soviet Union

Service history
- In service: 1933–1938 (SU-12), 1941(SU-1-12)
- Used by: Soviet Union
- Wars: World War II; Winter War; Soviet–Japanese border conflicts

Production history
- Designer: Leningrad Kirov Plant
- Designed: 1933
- Manufacturer: Kirov Plant
- Produced: 1933-1935
- No. built: 48 (SU-12), 51 (SU-1-12)

Specifications
- Mass: 3.7 tons
- Length: 5.61m
- Width: 1.9m
- Height: 2.325m
- Crew: 4
- Armor: 4 mm gun shield, 4 mm roof plate, 4 mm rear shield, 2 mm rear window (SU-1-12 only)
- Main armament: 76 mm regimental gun M1927 (36 rounds)
- Engine: GAZ M-1
- Suspension: Leaf spring
- Operational range: 370 km
- Maximum speed: 60 km/h, highway

The SU-12 (Russian: СУ-12) self-propelled gun battery (gun truck) was created in 1934 by the Union of Soviet Socialist Republics by mounting a 76 mm regimental gun M1927 onto a modified GAZ-AAA truck, and was in production from 1933 to 1935. The cannon's barrel and recoil system were modified to reduce recoil. It was the Soviet Union's first self-propelled gun. It had a four-man crew, including the driver, and the gun could rotate 270 degrees.

The SU-12 had no armor protection. This was corrected in the SU-1-12 model which added a front shield and roof armor of 4mm thickness. As time went by more armor, in the form of a 2mm rear window and a 4mm rear shield, were added to the SU-1-12 models. Most SU-12 units were decommissioned by 1938, but the Su-1-12 models served in the Battle of Lake Khasan, the Battles of Khalkhin Gol, and in the Winter War against Finland. By 1941 only 3 were left in service and had been supplanted by tracked SPGs.

== Other specifications ==
- fording depth = 0.82 m
- obstacle height = 0.75 m
- ditch crossing = 2 m
- ground pressure = 0.68 kg/cm^{2}
- gun elevation = -5°/+25°
- gun range of motion = 270°
