= 76 mm regimental gun M1927 =

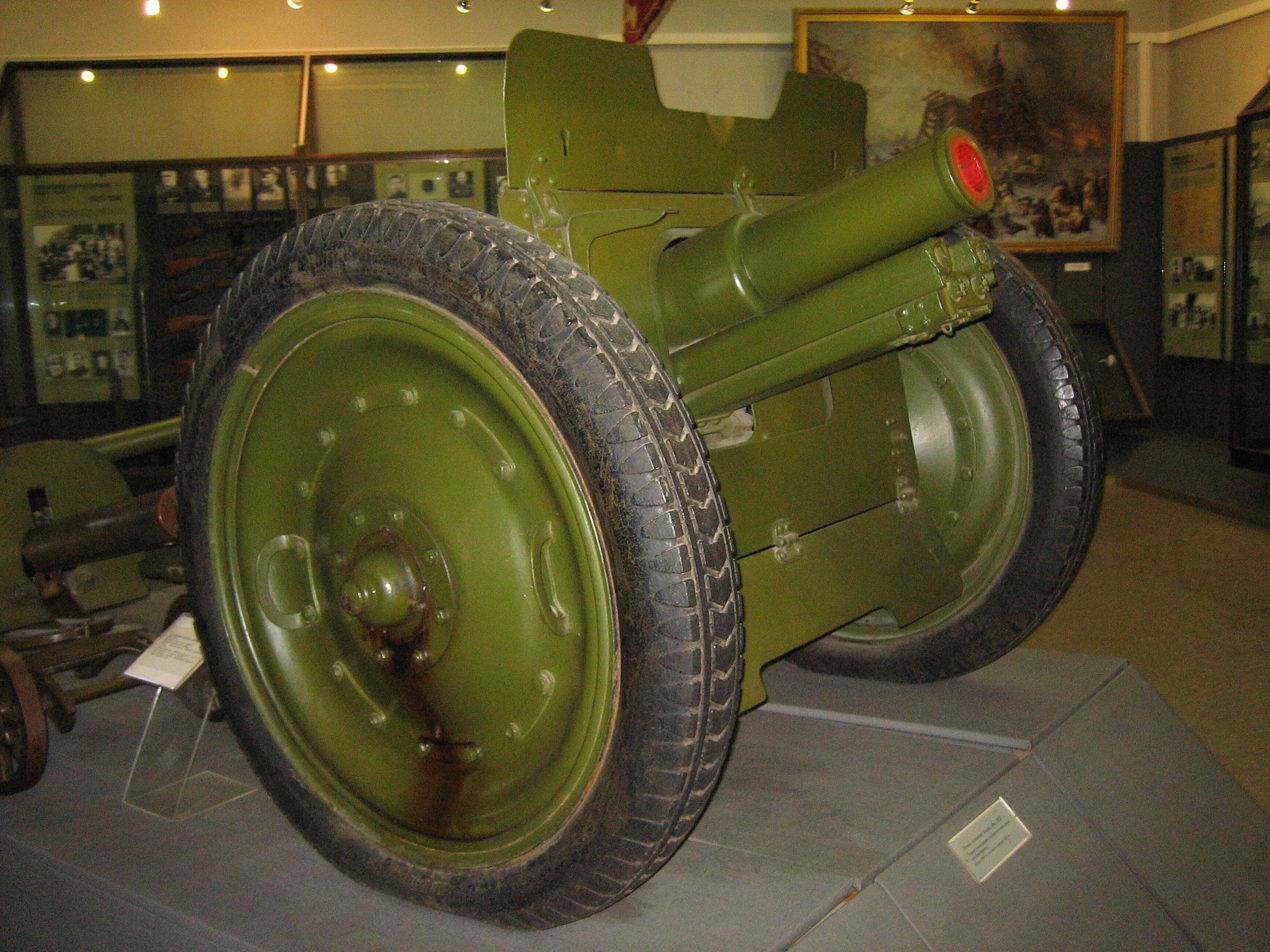
- 76-mm regimental gun model 1927 in the Central Armed Forces Museum, Moscow, Russia
- Type: Infantry support gun
- Place of origin: Soviet Union

Service history
- Used by: Soviet Union; Nazi Germany (captured); Finland (captured)
- Wars: Winter War; World War II

Production history
- Produced: 1928–1943
- No. built: 18,116

Specifications
- Mass: 780 kg (1,720 lb)
- Length: 3.5 m (11 ft 6 in)
- Barrel length: 1.25 m (4 ft 1 in) L/16.4
- Width: 1.7 m (5 ft 7 in)
- Height: 1.3 m (4 ft 3 in)
- Shell: Fixed QF 76.2 x 167mm R
- Shell weight: 6.2 kg (13 lb 11 oz)
- Caliber: 76.2 mm (3 in)
- Breech: interrupted screw
- Carriage: Pole trail
- Elevation: -6° to 25°
- Traverse: 6°
- Rate of fire: 10 - 12 rpm
- Muzzle velocity: 387 m/s (1,270 ft/s)
- Maximum firing range: 4.2 km (2.6 mi)

The 76 mm regimental gun M1927 (Russian: 76-мм полковая пушка обр. 1927 г.) was a Soviet infantry support gun.

The gun was developed in 1927 by the design bureau of Orudiyno-Arsenalny Trest (OAT) and entered production in 1928. A total of 18,116 pieces were built. On June 22, 1941, the Red Army had 4,708 of these guns. In 1943 the gun was replaced in production by the 76 mm regimental gun M1943, but remained in service until the end of the war. The Germans placed captured guns into service as the 7.62 cm Infanteriekanonenhaubitze 290(r) (infantry gun-howitzer), while in the Finnish army they were known as 76 RK/27.

The gun was intended for destruction of light field fortifications and openly placed personnel by direct fire similarly to how 7.7 cm Infanteriegeschütz L/27 with similar weight and ballistics was used by German troops in WWI. HEAT shell gave it limited anti-tank capabilities. It was chambered for the same shell size as 76.2mm divisional guns, but with a reduced propellant charge. Since firing higher-power divisional gun ammunition could damage the gun, the shell flange was modified so that divisional gun ammunition couldn't be loaded into the chamber of the regimental gun.

The M1927 was issued to rifle and cavalry regiments of the Red Army. Artillery battalion of rifle brigade included one battery of M1927. Some guns were used by anti-tank artillery battalions.

== Ammunition ==
- Ammunition types:
  - Fragmentation-HE: OF-350.
  - Fragmentation: O-350A.
  - HEAT: BP-350M.
- Projectile weight:
  - OF-350: 6.2 kg (13 lb 11 oz)
- Muzzle velocity:
  - OF-350, O-350A: 262 m/s (860 ft/s)
  - BP-350M: 311 m/s (1,020 ft/s)
- Effective range:
  - OF-350, O-350A: 4,200 m (4,600 yd)
  - BP-350M: 1,000 m (1,100 yd)

== 76 mm regimental gun M1943 ==
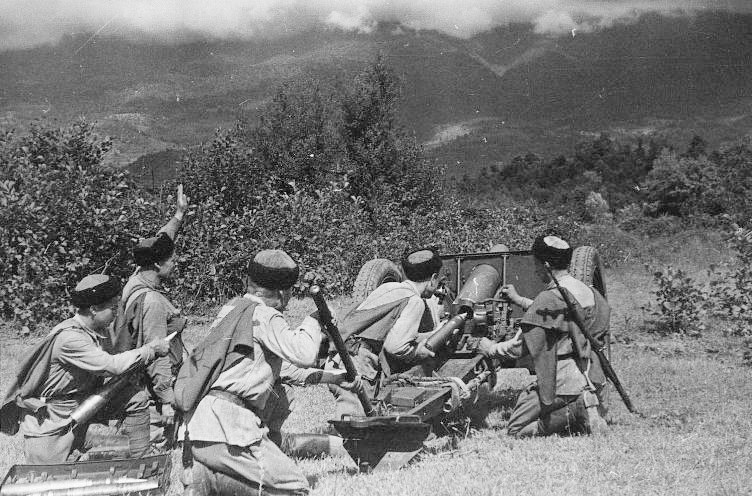
An M1927 gun crew firing at German positions during the Battle of the Caucasus, September 1942

The M1943 used a modernized barrel from the 76 mm regimental gun M1927 and the split-trail carriage from the 45 mm anti-tank gun M1942 (M-42).

== Self-Propelled Guns ==
- SU-12 - The M1927 was mounted on a shielded pedestal mount on a modified GAZ-AAA truck, and was in production from 1933 to 1935.
- SU-26 - The M1927 was mounted on a pedestal mount with a triangular shield on the chassis of the T-26 tank.

== Tank Guns ==
A variant of the M1927 with recoil length reduced from 90 cm (2 ft 11 in) to 50 cm (1 ft 8 in) was designated the 76 mm tank gun model 1927/32 (KT-28).

The 76 mm KT was installed in these Soviet tanks:

- BT-7A - The 76 mm KT was installed in a new turret on the chassis of the BT-7.
- T-26-4 - The 76 mm KT was installed in a new turret on the chassis of the T-26 .
- T-28 - The primary turret of early versions of the T-28 was armed with a 76 mm KT.
- T-35 - The primary turret was armed with a 76 mm KT.

== Bunker guns ==
The Soviets had also developed version of this gun for bunkers, the Finns called it 76 K/27-k. Finnish Army captured 13 bunker-version guns and reinstalled them to Finnish bunkers. Eight of those guns were lost in summer of 1944.

== Gallery ==
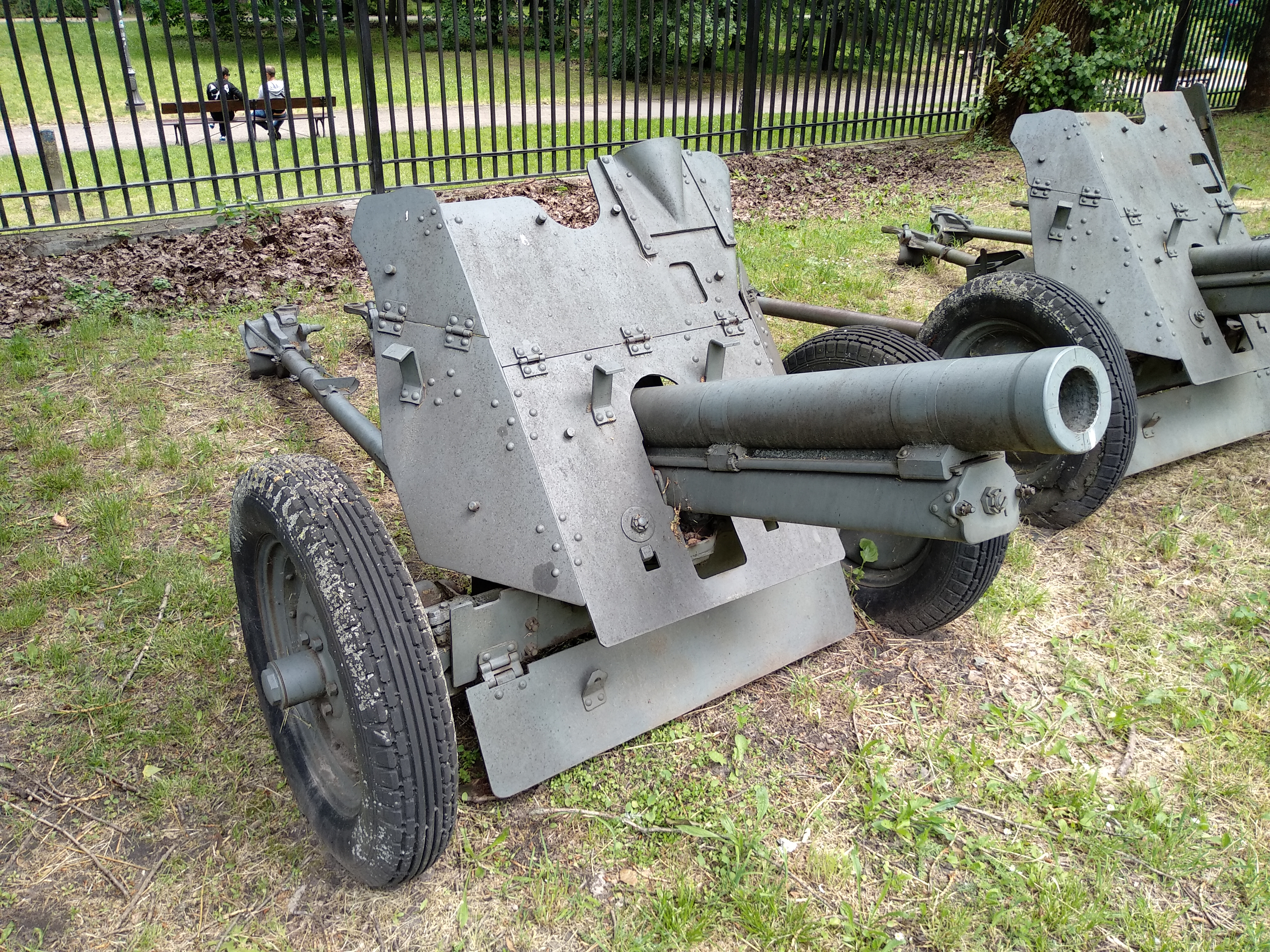
A M1943 at the Polish Army Museum in Warsaw.

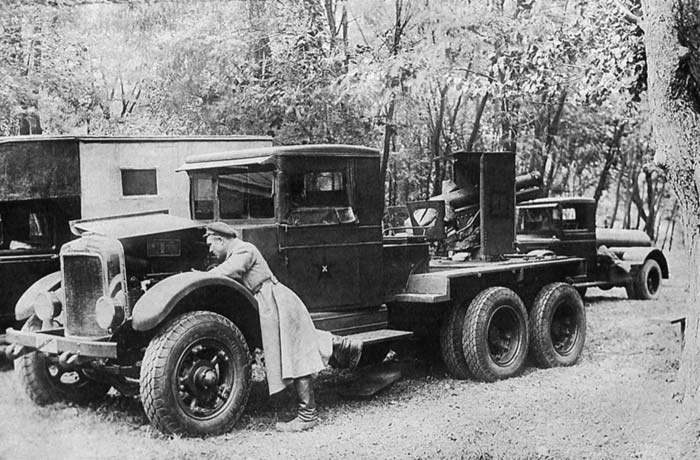
A SU-12 after maneuvers. Kiev Military District, 45th Mechanized Corps. Autumn 1933.

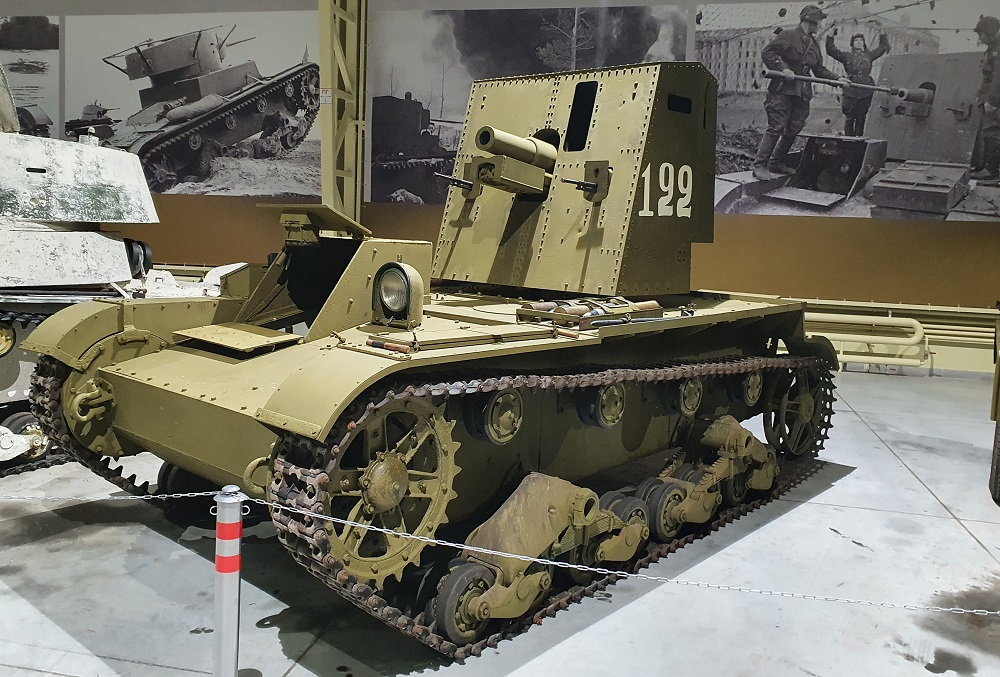
A SU-26 in the Museum of Russian Military History.

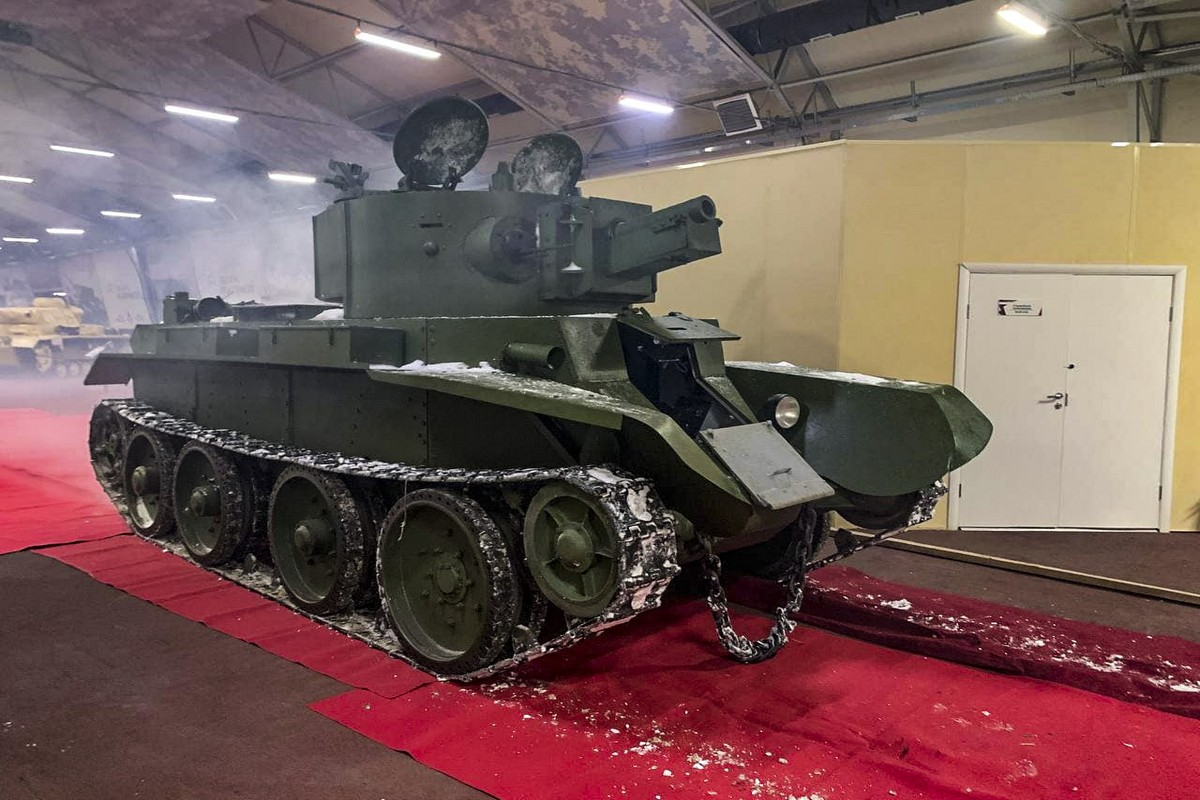
A BT-7A which is currently at Patriot Park near Moscow.

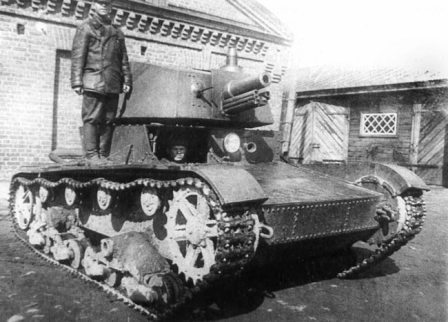
An early T-26 tank with A-43 turret.

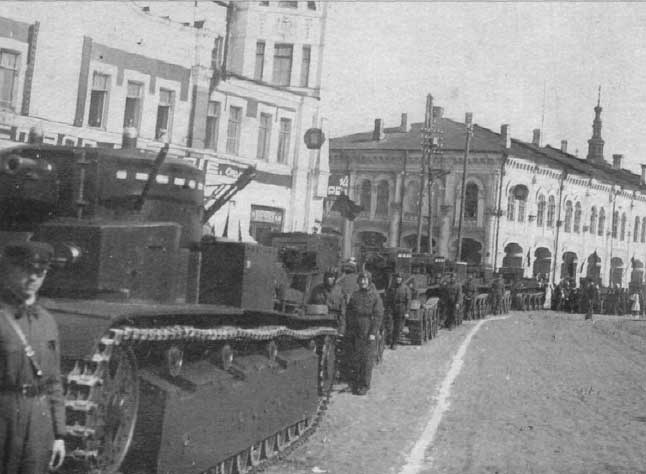
T-28 tanks in a military parade in Orel in the late 1930s.

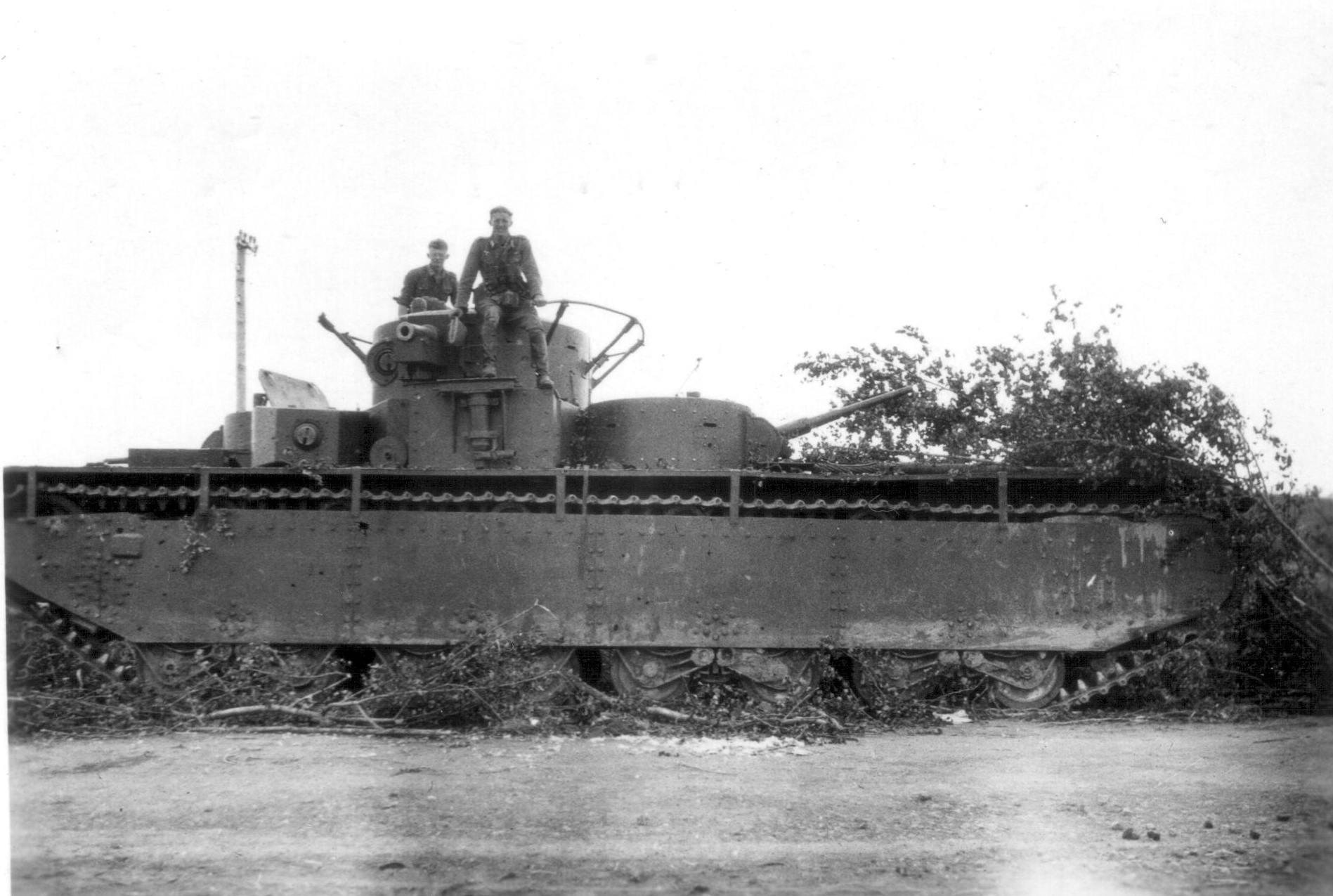
A captured T-35.

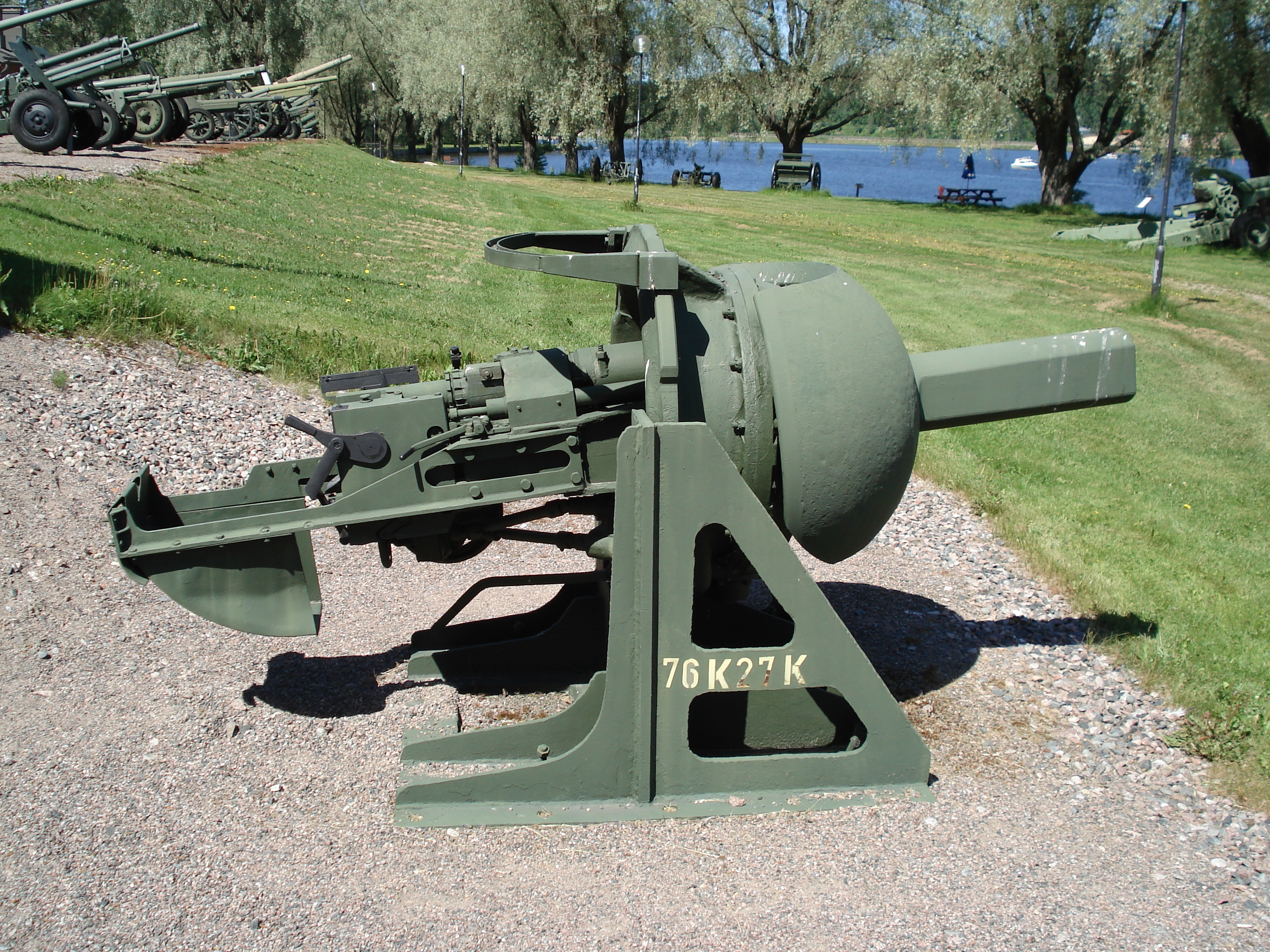
Side view of the 76 K/27-k

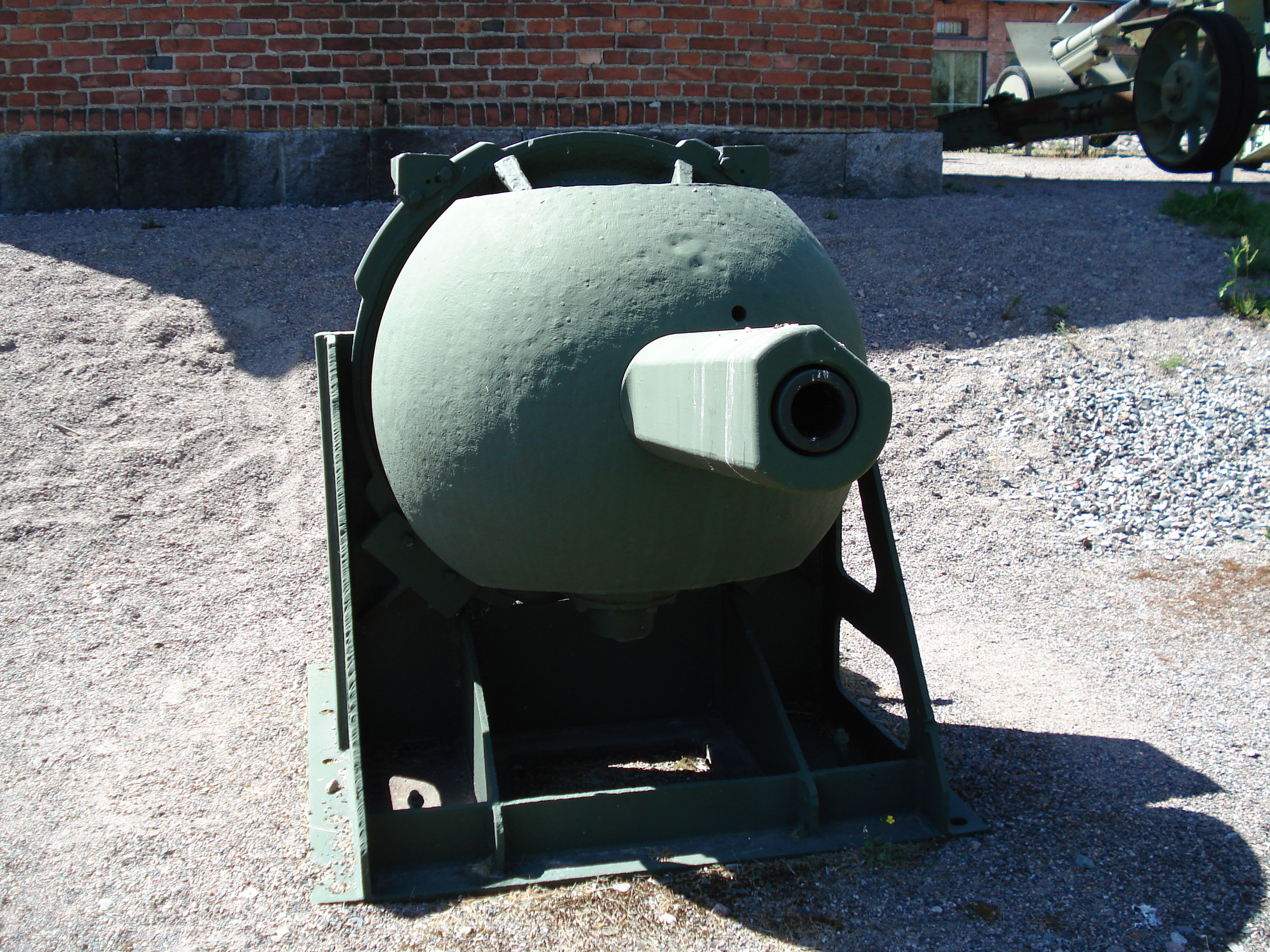
Front view of the 76 K/27-k
