= Enigma APC =

Enigma
- Type: Armored personnel carrier
- Place of origin: UAE

Production history
- Designer: Emirates Defense Technology
- Designed: 2015
- Manufacturer: Emirates Defense Technology
- Variants: See Variants

Specifications
- Mass: 28.0 tonnes (27.6 long tons; 30.9 short tons)
- Length: 8.4 metres (28 ft)
- Width: 2.9 metres (9 ft 6 in)
- Crew: 3 crew +8 passenger
- Main armament: 100 mm gun/launcher 2A70 (able to fire shells or the 9M117 Bastion ATGM); 30 mm autocannon 2A72
- Secondary armament: 1×7.62 mm PKT machine gun
- Engine: Caterpillar C13 Diesel; 711 horsepower (530 kW)
- Suspension: wheeled 8×8
- Operational range: 400 kilometres (250 mi)
- Maximum speed: 120 kilometres per hour (75 mph)

The Enigma is an 8×8 wheeled amphibious armored personnel carrier developed by Emirates Defense Technology in UAE. It was introduced at IDEX 2015.

== Design ==
The vehicle was designed and built in the UAE.

The driver sits at the front-left side with the engine to his right, the crew also includes a commander and gunner. The turret is in the middle, and the passenger compartment, which accommodates eight soldiers with their gear, is located at the rear. Soldiers enter and leave the vehicle via the powered rear door and roof hatches. Air-conditioning has been added for the comfort of crew and passengers.

The vehicle weighs 28 long tons (28 t). It measures 8.4 metres (28 ft) in length and 2.9 metres (9 ft 6 in) in width.

== Weapons ==
The Enigma is fitted with the turret of a Russian BMP-3 with 100 mm cannon, coaxial 30 mm machine gun, coaxial 7.62-mm machine gun, and smoke grenade launchers. The 100 mm cannon auto-loader is able to fire 10 rounds per minute, firing HE-FRAG projectiles beside ordinary and laser-guided anti-tank ammunition. It can launch laser-guided projectiles in the same manner as ordinary rounds.

The 30 mm auto-cannon is used against ground and low flying air targets with a range of 2 km against ground targets and 4 km against helicopters. Other proposed versions include a fire support vehicle (FSV) with a 155 mm howitzer, and an air defense vehicle fitted with automatic cannons.

== Protection ==
Enigma's front arc is able to withstand 30 mm armor-piercing rounds while other parts of the vehicle resist against 14.5 mm armor-piercing rounds. Additionally applied armor can be fitted according to customer requirements. The vehicle has a v-shaped hull to resist mines and IED explosions. The tires feature a 'run-flat' capability. Enigma has been provided with a battlefield management system (BMS), active defense suit, periscopes, local cameras and an NBC protection kit.

== Engine ==
The Enigma is powered by a Caterpillar turbocharged diesel engine developing 700 horsepower (520 kW). On paved streets, the Enigma can reach 120 kilometres per hour (75 mph) and has a range of around 400 kilometres (250 mi). The vehicle has an all-wheel steering capability. On water, the Enigma uses two propellers fixed to the rear of the hull.

== Variants ==
- Enigma AMFV - Base series designation.
- Enigma IFV - Infantry fighting vehicle.
- Enigma air defense variant with Rheinmettall Skyranger 35 turret
- Enigma CCV - command & control vehicle.
- Enigma - Fire support vehicle equipped with BAE systems M777 light weight howitzer (155mm caliber).
