= Bhim self-propelled howitzer =

Cancelled Indian howitzer

Bhim Self Propelled Howitzer
- Side view of the Bhim SPH prototype
- Type: Self-propelled artillery
- Place of origin: South Africa/India

Production history
- Designed: 1994
- Unit cost: US$4.5 million
- Produced: 1999-

Specifications
- Mass: Combat: 54 t (60 short tons)
- Length: 12.4 m (40 ft 8 in)
- Width: 4.7 m (15 ft 5 in)
- Height: 3.1 m (10 ft 2 in)
- Crew: 4 (commander, loader, driver and gunner)
- Traverse: 360°
- Maximum firing range: 52 km (32 mi)
- Armor: welded steel, 14.5 mm resistant additional bomblet protection
- Main armament: Denel 155 mm L52 G5 howitzer (50 rounds) 3 rounds in 9.0 seconds (Burst); 8 round/min
- Secondary armament: MAG 7.62 mm machine gun
- Engine: MTU 838 Ka-501; 1400 hp(1000 kW)
- Power/weight: 26 hp/t
- Suspension: hydropneumatic
- Operational range: 450 km (281 mi)
- Maximum speed: Road: 60 km/h (38 mph); Off-road: 45 km/h (28 mph)

The Bhim self-propelled howitzer was a type of self-propelled artillery developed by the South African company Denel under the supervision of the Indian Defence Research and Development Organisation. It was designed to meet the Indian Army's requirements for self-propelled artillery units. The howitzer is named after Bhima, one of the main protagonists and brother to Arjun of the Indian epic "Mahabharata".

== History ==
The Indian army had a requirement for 400 mounted 155-mm /52 howitzer, of which 200 would be mounted on the Arjun MBT chassis and another 200 to be mounted on modified Tatra trucks. Starting from a proposal to lease a few modern howitzer units, DRDO co-developed the Bhim SPH by mating a Denal T-6 turret provided by the South African Denal systems to the hull of a Arjun tank. The combination was found to be very effective and useful, and cleared all the development hurdles placed before it. During initial trails in 1998, The Bhim system had achieved a sustained rate of fire of 116 rounds in Pokhran, with an estimated deal signing by 2004, late postponed to 2005. The Indian Army was also reportedly pleased with the vehicles performance, and planned to divert a production line of the Arjun MBT for Bhim.

However, the programme ground to a halt in early 2005 when Denal systems was blacklisted by the Indian Government and South Africa faced Sanctions from India following a bribery allegation for the sale of rifles, just about two weeks before the Bhim deal was to be signed by DRDO with South Africa . It has largely been superseded by the acquisition of the K-9 Vajra howitzer from South Korea, which has been manufactured under license in India by L&T.

DRDO continued to attempt to find an alternative turret supplier, but was unsuccessful. DRDO declared completion of project works in 2011. The Investigation into Denal found no instance of wrongdoing, as India's Central Bureau of Investigation could not find find conclusive evidence to conclude that Denal had manipulated the deal. The Investigation concluded in 2012.

== Specifications ==
The Bhim artillery system has a fully automatic ammunition loading system as well as a turret-mounted auxiliary power unit, which powers all systems. The Bhim's primary armament is a Denel 155 mm howitzer gun, while its secondary armament consists of a single 7.62 mm machine gun. The turret has ammunition-loading hatches on the sides with a conveyor belt There are two hatches on the roof of the turret. The vehicle is equipped with GPS and an integrated fire control computer.

== See Also ==
- ATAGS
- Dhanush
- M-46 Catapult
- Pinaka
