= Maritime Artillery Militia =

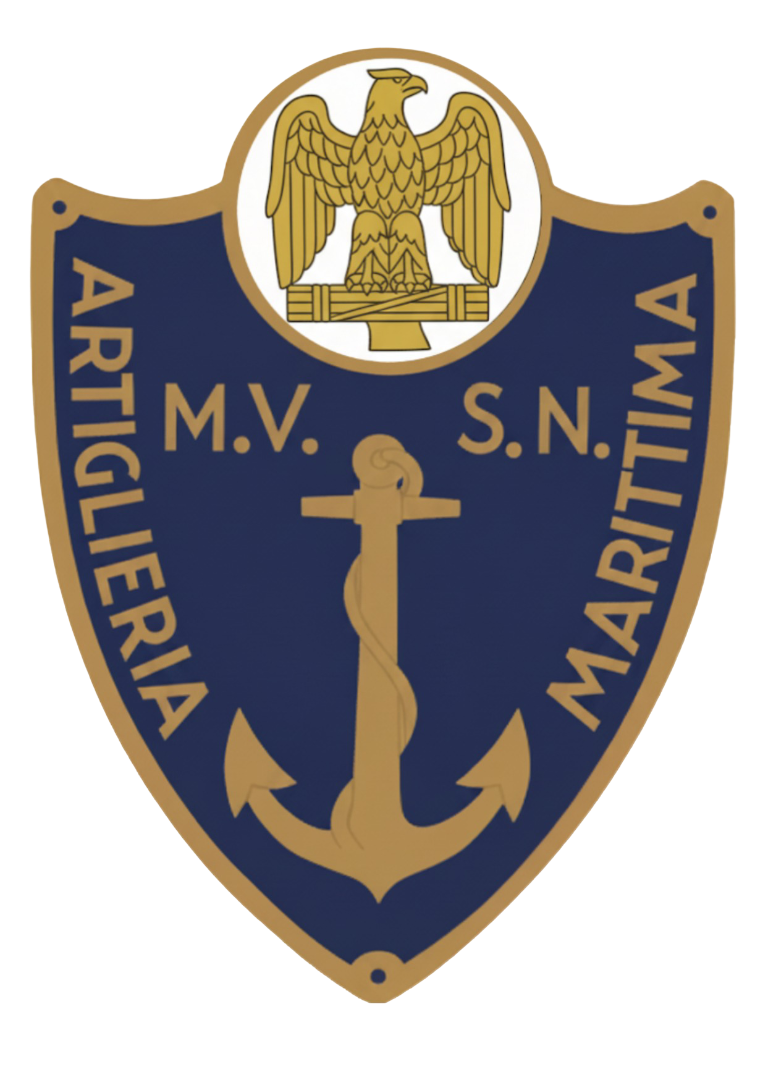
Badge

The Maritime Artillery Militia (Italian: Milizia marittima di artiglieria or MILMART) was an artillery unit of Italy's Milizia Volontaria per la Sicurezza Nazionale. It was active from 1939 to 6 December 1943.

== History ==
With the demobilisation of the Regio Esercito's coastal artillery units in 1934, responsibility for this had been transferred to the Regia Marina.

== Bibliography (in Italian) ==
- V. Ilari e A. Sema, Marte in orbace, Casa Editrice Nuove Ricerche, Ancona, 1988.
- E. Lucas e G. De Vecchi, Storia delle unità combattenti della M.V.S.N. (1923-1943), Ed. Volpe, Roma, 1976.
- L. Fulvi, Le Fanterie di Marina Italiane, Ufficio Storico della Marina Militare.
- G. Balestra e A. Curami, Gli autocannoni della Regia Marina nella campagna in Africa Settentrionale, Bollettino d'Archivio dell'Ufficio Storico della Marina Militare, dicembre 1991.
- C.A. Clerici, Le difese costiere italiane nelle due guerre mondiali, Albertelli Edizioni Speciali, Parma, 1996.

== External links (in Italian) ==
- "Page on regioesercito.it".
- "Batterie MILMART on 10 June 1940".
