= Dongfeng Mengshi =

Family of off-road vehicles

- Simplified Chinese: 东风猛士
- Literal meaning: Eastwind Warrior
Transcriptions

Dongfeng Mengshi was originally a family of 4×4 Infantry mobility vehicle/MRAPV/off-road vehicles developed by the Chinese Dongfeng Motor Group. Early generations of the vehicle are built with imported Hummer H1 chassis, while later generations are of indigenous design. Dongfeng Mengshi generally follows the trend of American military requirements. For example, CSK-141 is the Chinese equivalent of an armor-plated reinforced Humvee, while CSK-181 is the Chinese equivalent of the Joint Light Tactical Vehicle.

The Mengshi name was later introduced as an independent brand focusing on electric high performance and heavy duty SUVs inspired by the introduction of the GMC Hummer EV, with its first product being the Mengshi 917 also known as the M-Terrain prototype. While the electric Mengshi vehicles are introduced under the new Mengshi brand, Dongfeng continues to launch internal combustion engine-powered Mengshi series vehicles under the Dongfeng brand, such as the MS600 introduced around the same time period.

== First generation ==
=== EQ2050 ===
The Dongfeng EQ2050 is a Chinese-made 4×4 armored vehicle based on the Humvee, manufactured for government use by the Dongfeng Motor Group. It is known to be sold by the company for 700,000 Yuan ($93,000). The vehicle was created after People's Liberation Army (PLA) officials saw the Humvee deployed in the Gulf War. While it is used in the PLA, it has also been exported to friendly countries for military use. The EQ2050 is largely being replaced in its role by the newer Dongfeng Mengshi class of vehicles.

== Second generation ==
=== CSK-131 ===
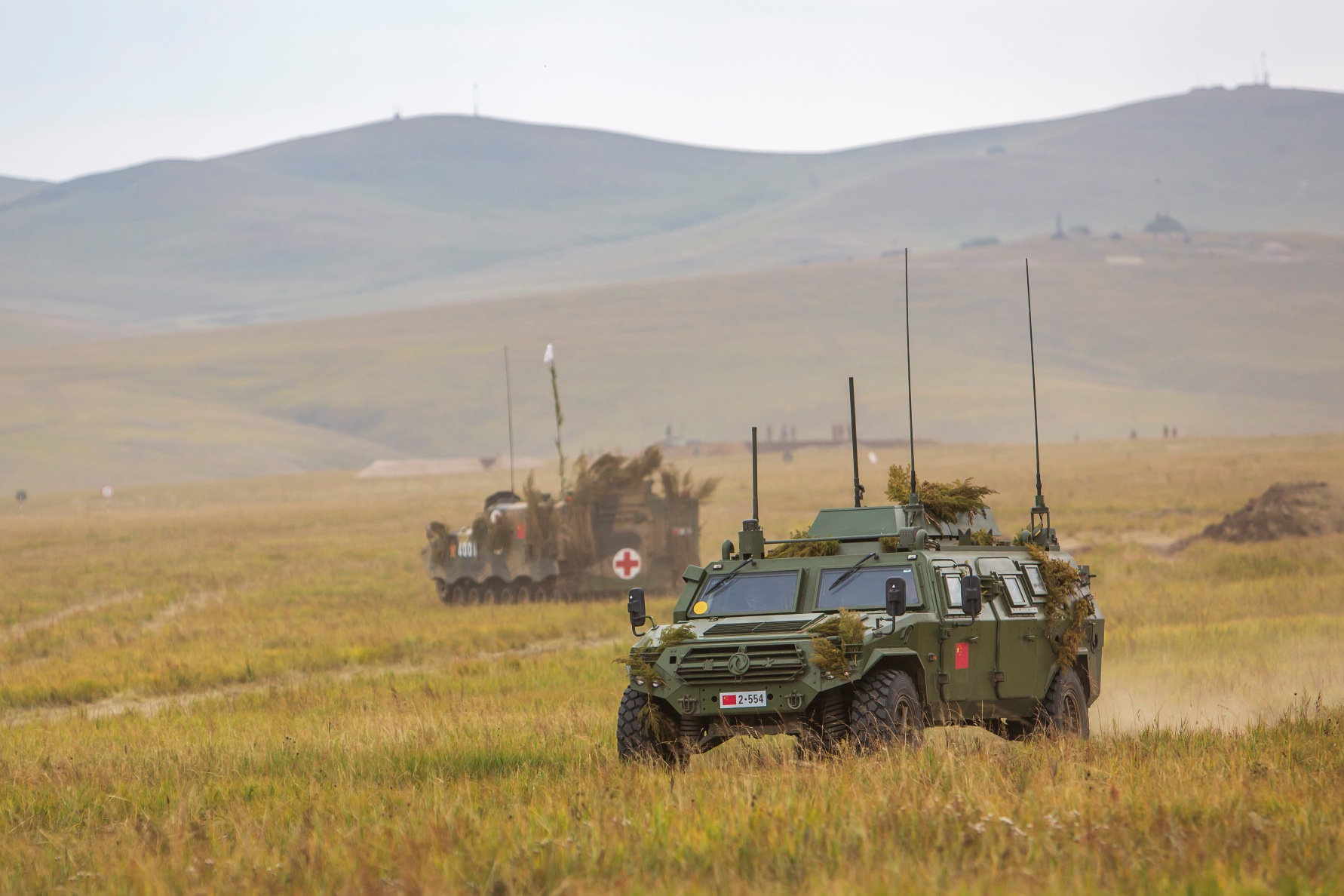
CSK-131 Mengshi (front)

Dongfeng CSK131 is Chinese light protected 4×4 vehicle developed by Dongfeng Corporation. The chassis has been completely redesigned from EQ2060 with new engine and electronics including onboard computers with digital map software and Beidou satellite communication and positioning system, one night-vision camera for driver and one for the rear door. It is one of the two principal light armored vehicle currently fielded by PLA. All CSK-131 are equipped with a manually controlled turret.

Dimensions and weight (CSK131)

- Weight (gross): 6,300 kg (13,900 lb)
- Weight (curb): 3,700 kg (8,200 lb)
- Payload capacity: 1,400 kg (3,100 lb)
- Towing capacity: 2,000 kg (4,409.2 lb)
- Length: 5,100 mm (200.8 in)
- Width: 2,400 mm (94.5 in)
- Height: 2,000 mm (78.7 in)

==== Variants ====
CSK-131 Command Post
Command post vehicle with communication suite on board.
CSK-131 Armored Reconnaissance Vehicle
Armaments include 12.7 mm machines guns and 35 mm automatic grenade launcher on a remote weapon station. The variant has a data-link, all-weather monitoring, and a retractable mast equipped with electro-optical sensor and radar. The vehicle is capable of conduct combat reconnaissance mission as well as providing fire support guidance for artillery.
TL-4 mounted missile system
Based on CSK-131 chassis, the variant is equipped with four TL-4 fire-and-forget anti-tank missiles.

=== CSK-141 (CS/VN11) ===
Dongfeng CSK141 is a Chinese light protected vehicle developed by Dongfeng Corporation. Although sharing a lot of similarities to the CSK-131, the chassis of CSK-141 has a much longer wheelbase with a longer crew cabin having space for 10 infantry. CSK141 shares similar electronics with CSK131 such as computer, satellite suite and night vision cameras. This vehicle features unusual clamshell doors on either side which the door divide into upper and lower part. It is one of the two principal light armored vehicle currently fielded by PLA. All CSK-141 are equipped with a remote-controlled turret that can be mounted with machine guns, anti-tank missile and grenade launchers. The civilian version is designated Dongfeng EQ2101 (with a 6x6 configuration), and the export version is designated CS/VN11. First released in 2016, CS/VN11 has conventional side doors instead of clamshell type side doors.

Dimensions and weight

- Weight (gross): 6,300 kg (13,900 lb)
- Weight (curb): 4,000 kg (8,800 lb)
- Payload capacity: 1,200 kg (2,600 lb)
- Towing capacity: 2,000 kg (4,400 lb)
- Length: 5,800 mm (228.3 in)
- Width: 2,400 mm (94.5 in)
- Height: 2,000 mm (78.7 in)

== Third generation ==
=== EQ2111 ===
EQ2111 is the prototype for the next-generation MRAP-like light tactical vehicle.

Dimensions and weight

- Weight (curb): 8,500 kg (18,700 lb)
- Payload capacity: 2,200 kg (4,900 lb)
- Length: 5,950 mm (234.3 in)
- Width: 2,485 mm (97.8 in)
- Height: 2,430 mm (95.7 in)

=== CSK-181 ===
CSK-181 is the new generation of 4×4 light tactical vehicles developed by Dongfeng for the PLA. It is based on the CSK-141 and features one driver, one weapon station operator as a co-driver, and eight infantry seats. This variant has improved satellite communication capabilities, longer-range night-vision cameras, and, most importantly, Mine-Resistant Ambush Protection capability. All CSK-181 vehicles are equipped with a remote-controlled turret that can be mounted with machine guns, anti-tank missiles, and grenade launchers. The vehicle has been in service since 2020.

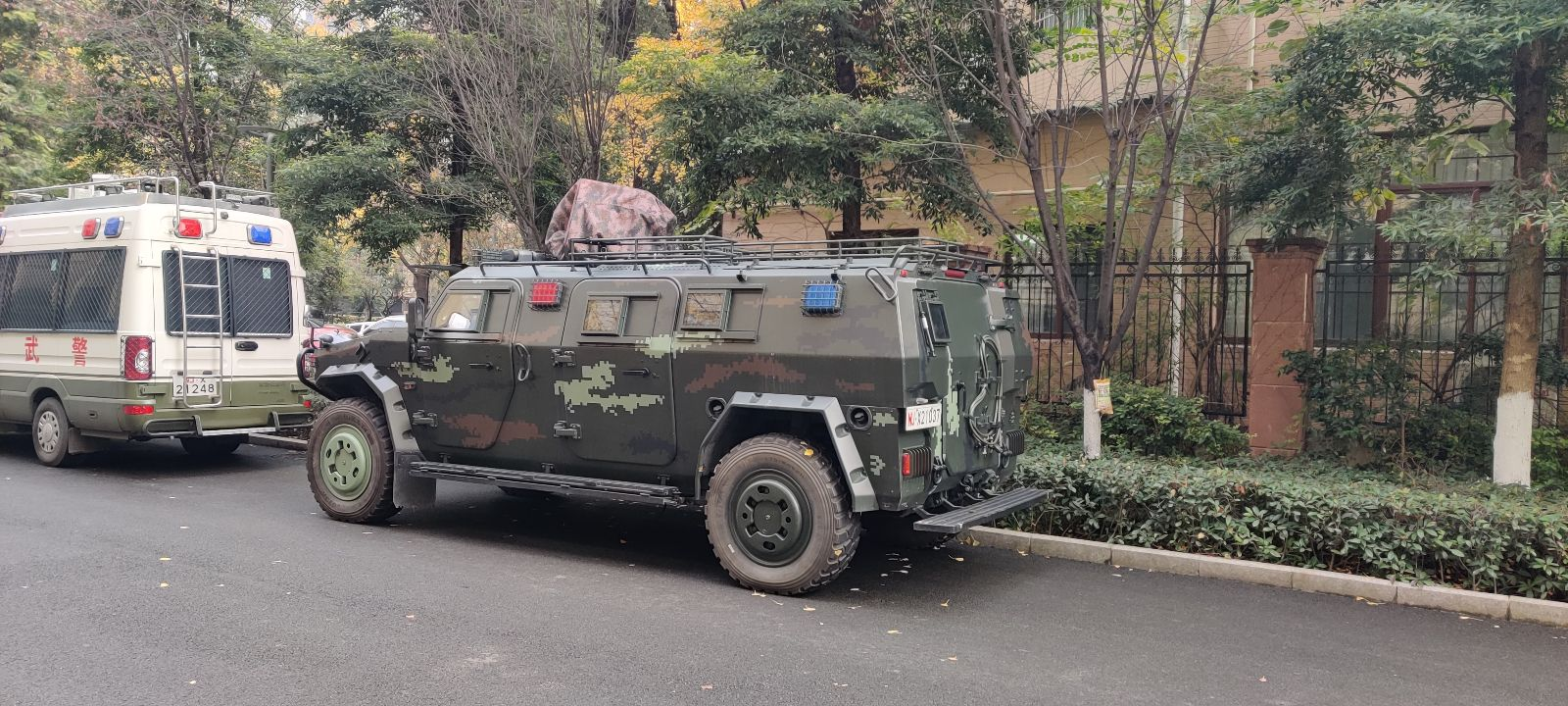
People's Armed Police CSK-181

Dimensions and weight

- Crew: 2 (driver and weapon station operator)
- Passengers: 8
- Weight (total): 8,000 kg (18,000 lb)
- Weight (curb): 6,200 kg (13,700 lb)
- Payload capacity: 1,800 kg (4,000 lb)
- Towing capacity: 2,000 kg (4,400 lb)
- Length: 5,650 mm (222.4 in)
- Width: 2,380 mm (93.7 in)
- Height (without turret): 2,125 mm (83.7 in)
- Maximum speed: 120 km/h (75 mph)
- Minimum speed: 3 km/h (1.9 mph)

==== Variants ====
CSK-181 C2
CSK-181 based command and control (C2) vehicle.
CSK-181 ATGM
CSK-181 based ATGM carrier. Fitted with sensors and unknown type of ATGM. HJ-11 or AFT-11, an improved derivative of HJ-8 missile, is estimated to be the missile mounted on CSK-181.
CSK-181 Reconnaissance
CSK-181 based reconnaissance vehicle with telescopic sensor tower.
CSK-182
CSK-182 is the shorter version of CSK-181 with six seats including one driver and one weapon station operator. It is based on EQ2111.

=== CTL181/CTL181A ===
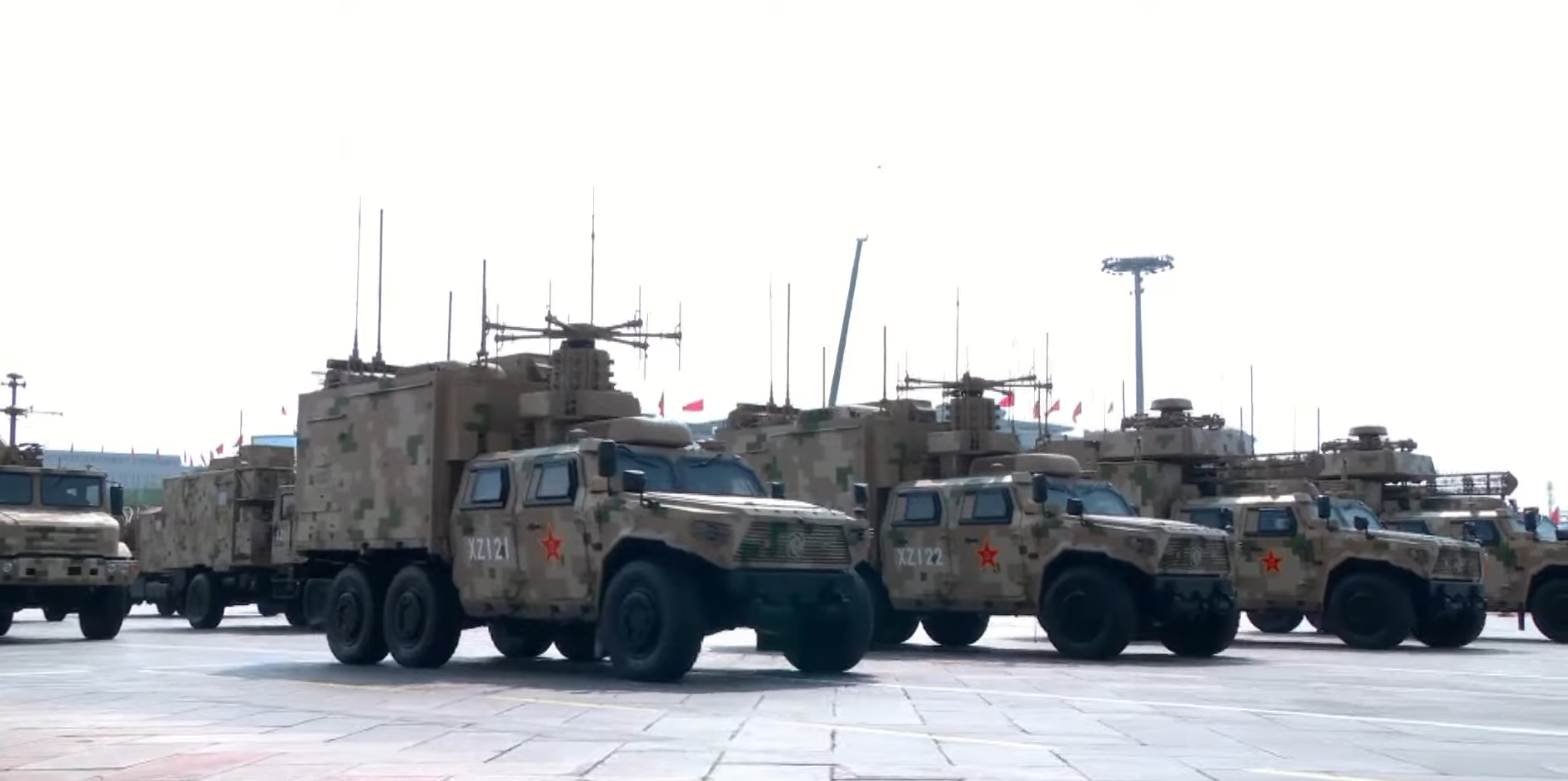
CTL-181A based cyberwarfare and information support vehicles

CTL181 and CTL181A are light protected trucks modified on CSK-181 chassis. The CTL181 has single cab while CTL181A is double cab.

Dimensions and weight (CTL181)

- 6x6 all wheel drive
- Weight (total): 10,500 kg (23,100 lb)
- Weight (curb): 6,800 kg (15,000 lb)
- Payload capacity: 3,650 kg (8,050 lb)
- Towing capacity: 2,500 kg (5,500 lb)
- Length: 6,450 mm (253.9 in)
- Width: 2,380 mm (93.7 in)
- Height: 2,125 mm (83.7 in)

==== Variants ====
PCL-171
122mm truck-mounted howitzer (self-propelled howitzer, SPH) capable of rapid deployment. The vehicle chassis is based on CTL-181A. PCL-171 is fitted with hydropneumatic suspension, allowing better gun depression when direct firing.
CTL-181A ATMC
Fitted with four HJ-10 anti-tank missile and electro-optical sensors.
CTL-181A Mortar Carrier
Fitted with vehicle-mounted 120 mm mortar and ammunition storage unit.
CTL-181A Multiple Rocket Launcher
Fitted with vehicle-mounted 122 mm multiple rocket launcher and ammunition storage unit.
CTL-181A Assault Bridge Builder
It is equipped with a vehicle-launched bridge at the back.
CTL-181A UAV Swarm
Fitted with a multiple launch system capable of launching small UAV/loitering munition.
CTL-181A EW/ESW
CSK-181A based EW vehicles.
CTL-181A EW C2
CSK-181A based C2 vehicles for EW units.
CTL-181A Air-Defense System
CTL-181A based anti-aircraft artillery system. It's fitted with a 20 mm (0.79 in) rapid-firing autocannon, three surface-to-air missiles, two anti-tank missiles, and optical sensors for tracking. A command vehicle based on the same chassis is also available.
CTL-181A OW5-A10 Laser Weapon
CTL-181A based laser weapon.
FB-10A Air-Defense System
Missile vehicle based on the Mengshi 6x6 truck chassis. The vehicle features a phased array radar, an optical sensor, and eight FB-10A missiles. A separate surveillance radar truck on the same chassis is available.
SWS3/LD35L Gun-Missile Air Defense System
Air defense vehicle based on Dongfeng Mengshi 6×6 truck chassis. The Aramanets consist of a 35mm single-barrel autocannon and two FB-10A missiles. The sensor onboard includes an electro-optical targeting system and a phased-array radar. This vehicle is deployed by PLAGF's light combined arms brigades.

=== CSZ181 ===
CSZ181 is the protected support vehicle variant in a box truck form.

Dimensions and weight (CSZ181)

- 6x6 all wheel drive
- Weight (total): 10,000 kg (22,000 lb)
- Payload capacity: 2,000 kg (4,400 lb)
- Towing capacity: 2,000 kg (4,400 lb)
- Length: 6,500 mm (255.9 in)
- Width: 2,380 mm (93.7 in)
- Height: 2,125 mm (83.7 in)
- Wheelbase: 3,600 mm (140 in) and 1,200 mm (47 in)
- Minimum ground clearance: 405 mm (15.9 in)
- Maximum speed: 120 km/h (75 mph)
- Maximum range: 750 km (470 mi)
- Fuel consumption (100 km): 18 L/100 km (13 mpg_{‑US})
- Maximum climbing gradient: 60%

==== Variants ====
CSZ-181 MEDVAC
medical evacuation vehicle based on the CSZ181 chassis.
CSZ-181 EW/ESM
multiple electronic warfare and electronic support measures systems based on CSZ181 box truck. Fitted with telescopic masts in VHF/UHF/SHF spectrum, for communication, monitoring, direction-finding, etc.

== Civilian line ==
The civilian line is called Chinese: 猛士; pinyin: Měngshī; lit. 'Ferocious Man' in Mandarin, differing in tone from the military line.

=== M50 ===
The Dongfeng Mengshi M50 launched in July 2021 is the civilian version of the original EQ2050. It is available in various body styles with options including a single cab or crew cab setup, low and high roof setups, sealed cargo compartment models, and chassis cab variants.

M50 Shen Nung
M50 based laser weapon system. Fitted with a high-power laser, search and track radar, and optical sensors to attack small UAVs.

=== MS600 (M20) ===
The Dongfeng Mengshi MS600 is a heavy-duty pickup, SUV, and chassis cab truck. With M20 being the name used before the official launch. Different from previous Mengshi ICE-powered products, the MS600 models are available to the general public. It was introduced in February 2023.

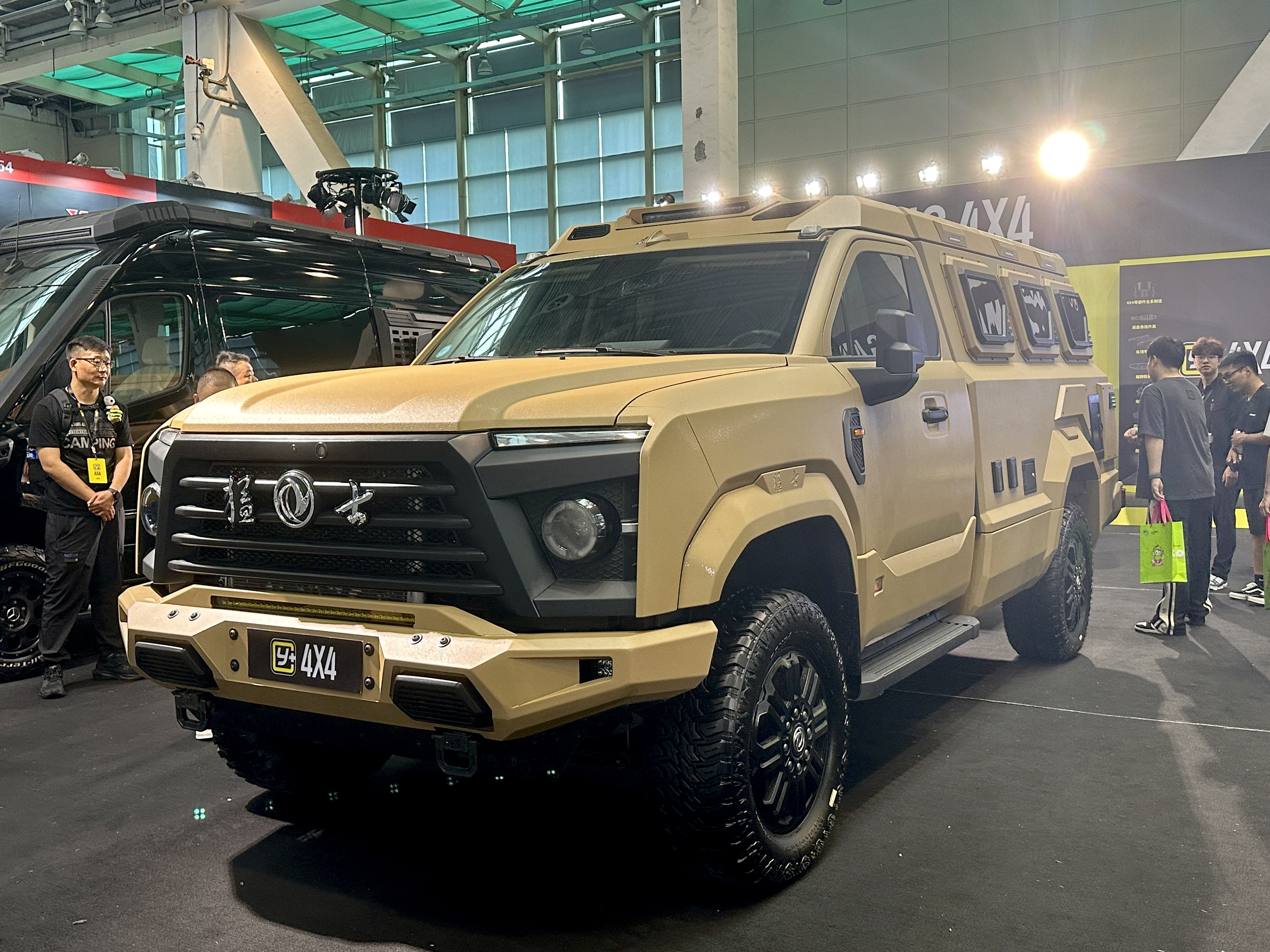
Dongfeng Mengshi MS600-based armored vehicle (front)

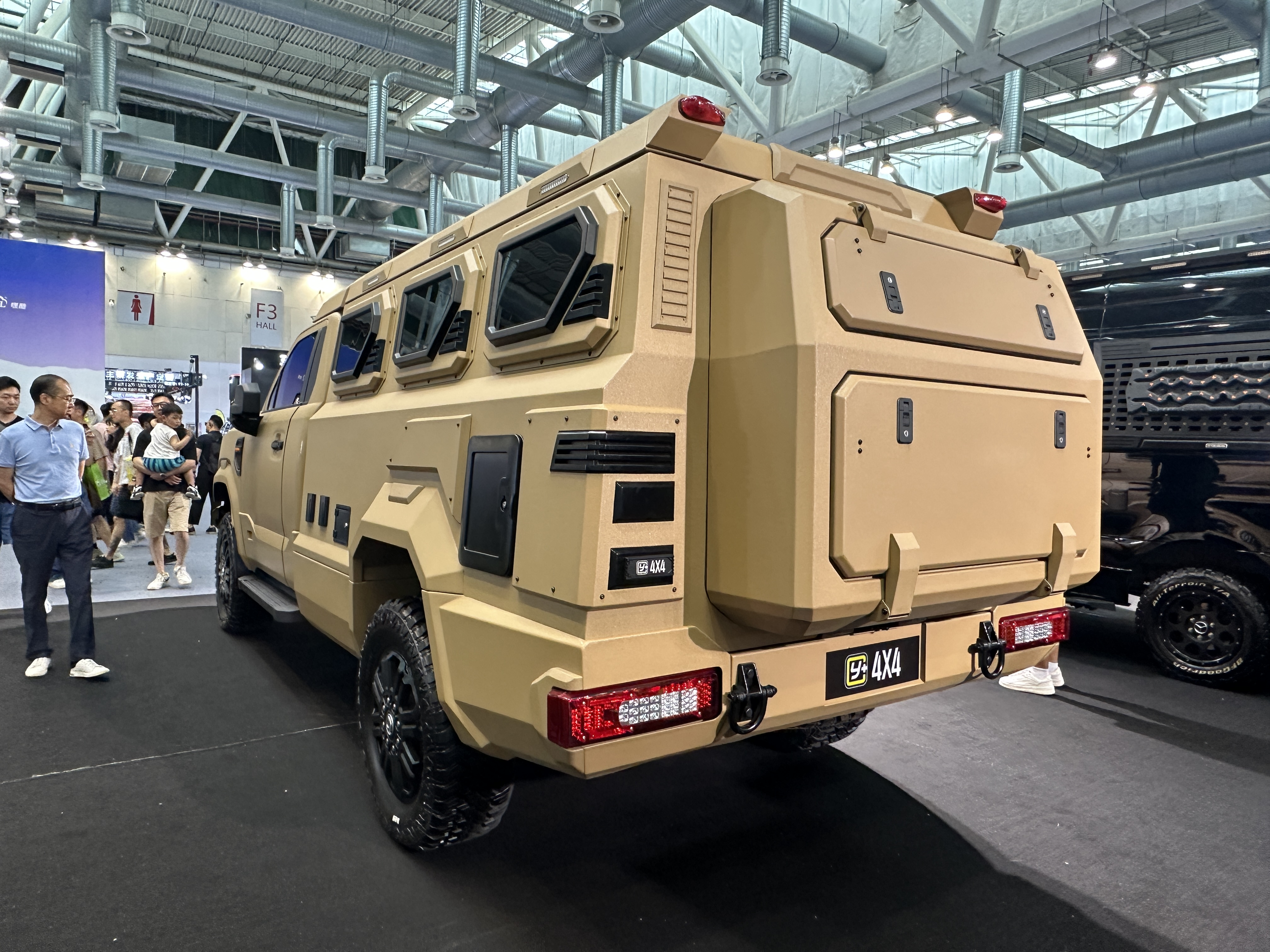
Dongfeng Mengshi MS600-based armored vehicle (rear)

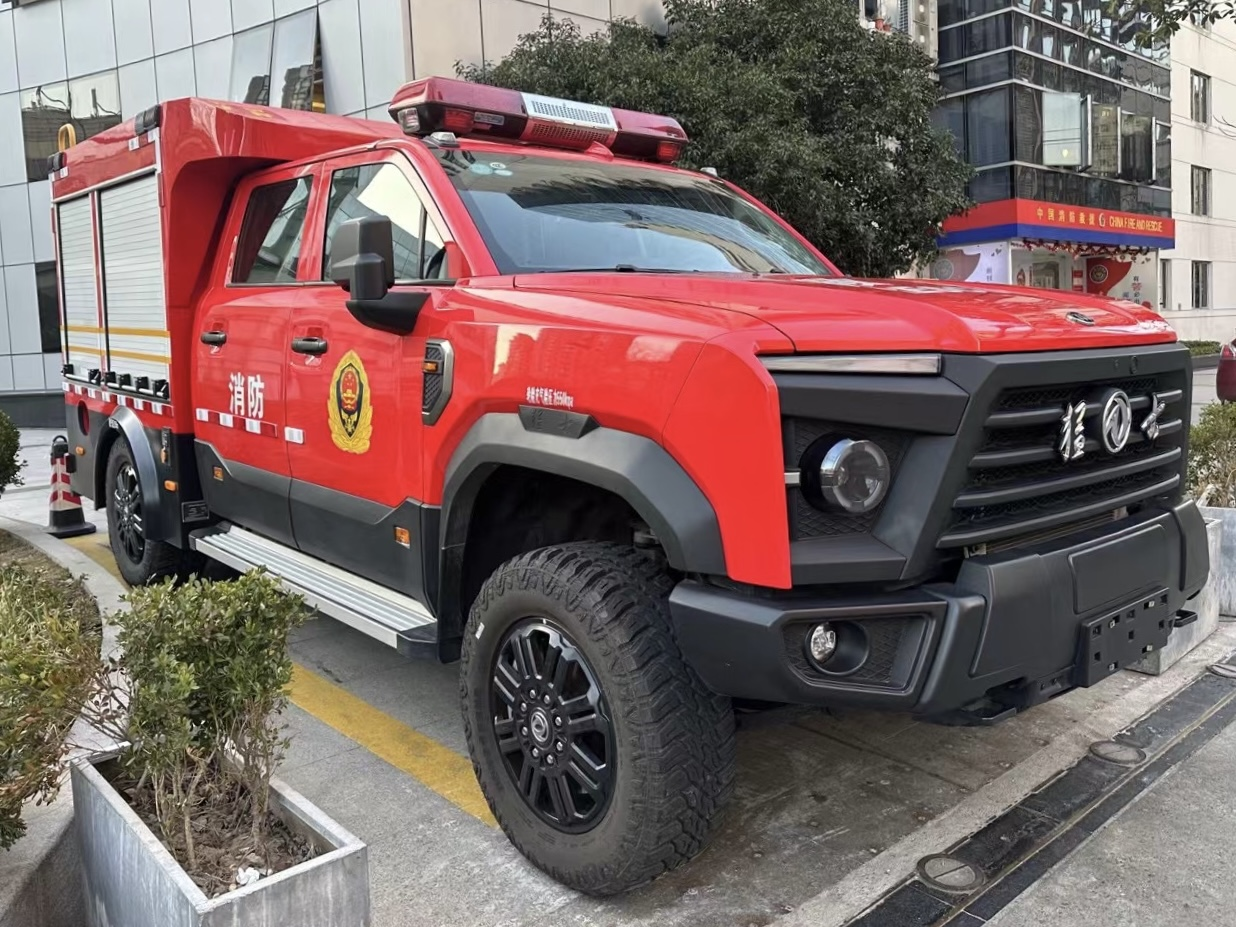
Dongfeng Mengshi MS600 of the National Fire and Rescue Administration

=== Mengshi 917 (M-Terrain) ===
The Mengshi M-Terrain EV SUV is a prototype previewing the production Mengshi 917 full-size electric SUV. The prototype was introduced in August 2022 during the launch of the independent Mengshi brand, with the production 917 unveiled in January 2023.

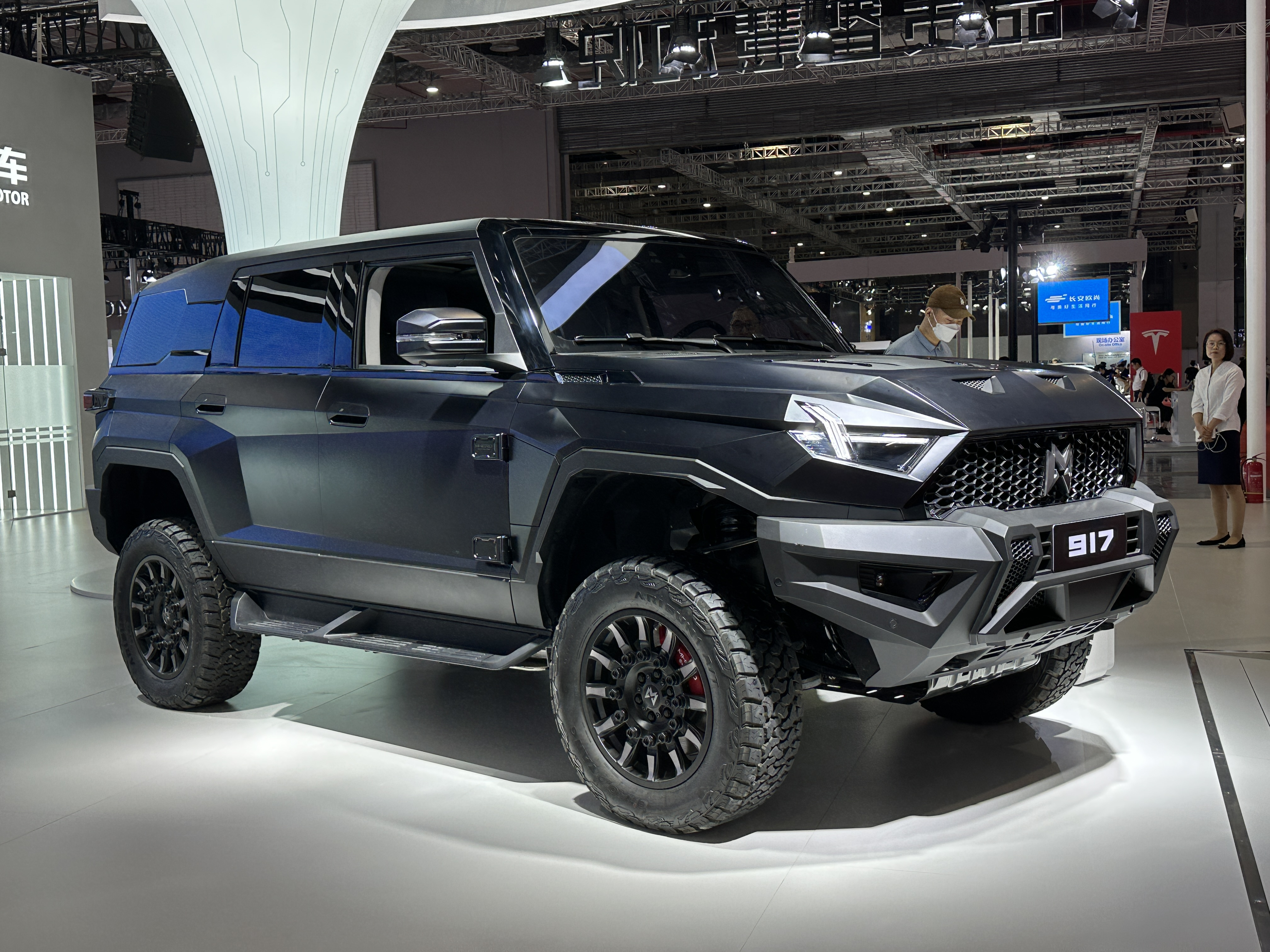
Mengshi 917 (front)

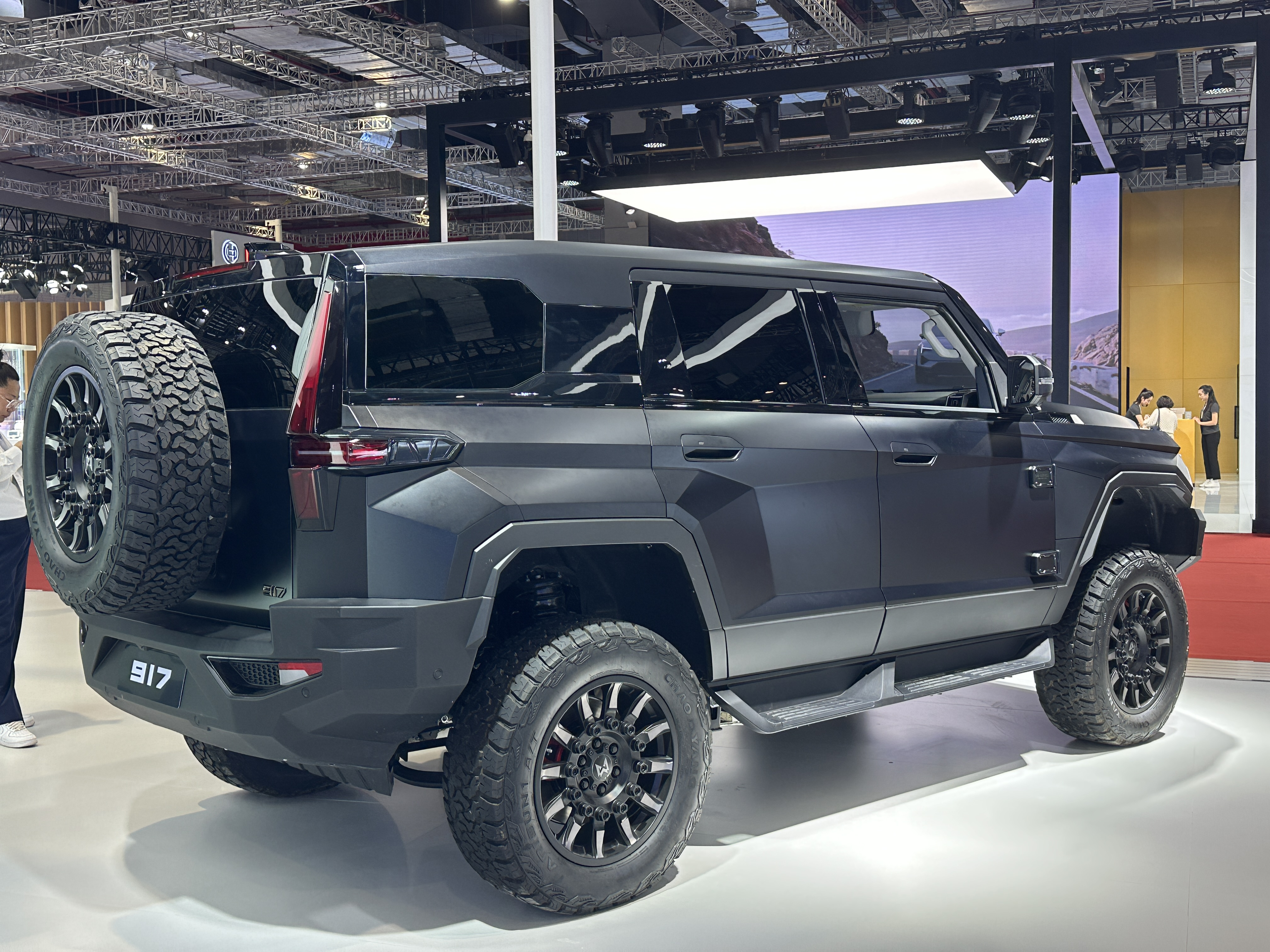
Mengshi 917 (rear)

== Operators ==
- China
  - People's Liberation Army Ground Forces
  - People's Armed Police
  - National Fire and Rescue Administration
- Pakistan: around 300 CSK-182 were delivered starting in 2021

== See also ==
- Humvee clone manufacturing in China
- MRAP
- BJ2022 – (China)

Vehicles of comparable roles

- Joint Light Tactical Vehicle – (United States)
- Humvee – (United States)
- GAZ Tigr – (Russia)
- Kamaz Typhoon – (Russia)
- Bushmaster Protected Mobility Vehicle – (Australia)
- Hawkei – (Australia)
