= PCL-171 =

Chinese 122 mm self-propelled howitzer

- Type: Self-propelled howitzer
- Place of origin: China

Service history
- In service: 2020–present
- Used by: People's Liberation Army

Specifications
- Mass: 11 t (11 long tons; 12 short tons)
- Length: 6.54–7 m (21.5–23.0 ft)
- Width: 2.38 m (7 ft 10 in)
- Height: 2.13 m (7 ft 0 in)
- Shell: 122 mm (4.8 in)
- Breech: Semi-automatic vertical wedge type breech block
- Effective firing range: 18–22 km (11–14 mi) (conventional projectile)
- Maximum firing range: 27–40 km (17–25 mi) (extended range projectile)
- Main armament: 122 mm howitzer gun
- Engine: YC6DV1 V-type six-cylinder water-cooled supercharged inter-cooled diesel engine 295 hp (220 kW)
- Suspension: hydropneumatic suspension
- Operational range: 700 km (430 mi)
- Maximum speed: 120 km/h (75 mph)

The PCL-171 is an assault-vehicle-mounted, 122 mm self-propelled howitzer used by the Chinese People's Liberation Army Ground Force. The designation "PCL" is an acronym derived from pinyin (Chinese: 炮车榴弹炮; pinyin: Pào Chē Liúdànpào; lit. 'Gun Vehicle Howitzer').

== Development ==
The PCL-171 made its first public appearance during a CCTV report of an exercise in December 2020. According to the report, it entered service in the second half of 2020.

It was designed as an even more mobile and lightweight platform to complement the PCL-161, which is based on a larger truck chassis but also equipped with a 122 mm howitzer.

== Design ==
Each battery consists of 6 PCL-171 guns, command vehicles, ammunition vehicles, reconnaissance vehicles and other equipment. Some of the non-gun vehicles are based on Dongfeng Mengshi CTL181A 4×4 armoured vehicles, with at least two variants in service. The command vehicle has communications equipment mounted on the vehicle while the reconnaissance vehicle is fitted with a counter-battery radar system, including a radar antenna and an opto-electronic sight mounted on an elevating mast.

=== Gun ===
The howitzer has a maximum firing range of 18–22 km (11–14 mi) with conventional ammunition and up to 27–40 km (17–25 mi) with extended range ammunition. Each vehicle can carry 28 rounds of 122 mm rounds, for a total of 168 rounds of rounds for a battery of 6 guns.

=== Vehicle ===
The PCL-171 is based on Dongfeng Mengshi 6×6 assault vehicle chassis, specifically the CTL181A variant.

After the gun enters its firing position, 2 front hydraulic jacks and 2 backhoes can be automatically lowered to increase stability. PCL-171 is fitted with hydropneumatic suspension, allowing better gun depression when direct firing.

== Deployment ==
In April 2020, at least 6 PCL-171s were deployed in a training exercise in an unknown location.

== Operators ==
- China: People's Liberation Army Ground Force – 120 units as of 2022.
