= Avibras A-80 Falcão =

Brazilian training aircraft

- A-80 Falcão photographed in São José dos Campos, 1963.

General information
- Type: Light aircraft
- Manufacturer: Avibras
- Designer: José Carlos de Sousa
- Number built: 1

History
- First flight: 23 October 1963

The Avibras A-80 Falcão was a training aircraft from the Brazilian manufacturer Avibras.

== Design and development ==
The A-80 Falcão was developed as a beginner trainer aircraft for the Brazilian Air Force, but the latter opted for the Aerotec A-122 Uirapuru, so only one prototype was built.

The aircraft was designed as a low-wing monoplane with a conventional tailplane and had a non-retractable nose wheel landing gear. The aircraft was of wooden frame construction covered with synthetic fabric. The instructor and student pilots sat in an enclosed cockpit, the canopy of which could be slid rearward for entry.

== Specifications ==
Data from The Aircraft of The World 1965

General characteristics

- Crew: Two
- Length: 7.04 m (23 ft 1 in)
- Wingspan: 8.36 m (27 ft 5 in)
- Wing area: 10 m^{2} (107.5 sq ft)
- Empty weight: 379 kg (836 lb)
- Gross weight: 584 kg (1,287 lb)
- Powerplant: 1 × Continental C65-8F , 48 kW (64 hp)
- Propellers: 2-bladed

Performance

- Maximum speed: 210 km/h (130 mph, 110 kn)
- Cruise speed: 185 km/h (115 mph, 100 kn)
- Range: 560 km (350 mi, 300 nmi)

== See also ==
- Avibras Falcão
