= Tatra 815-7 =

Czech heavy military truck

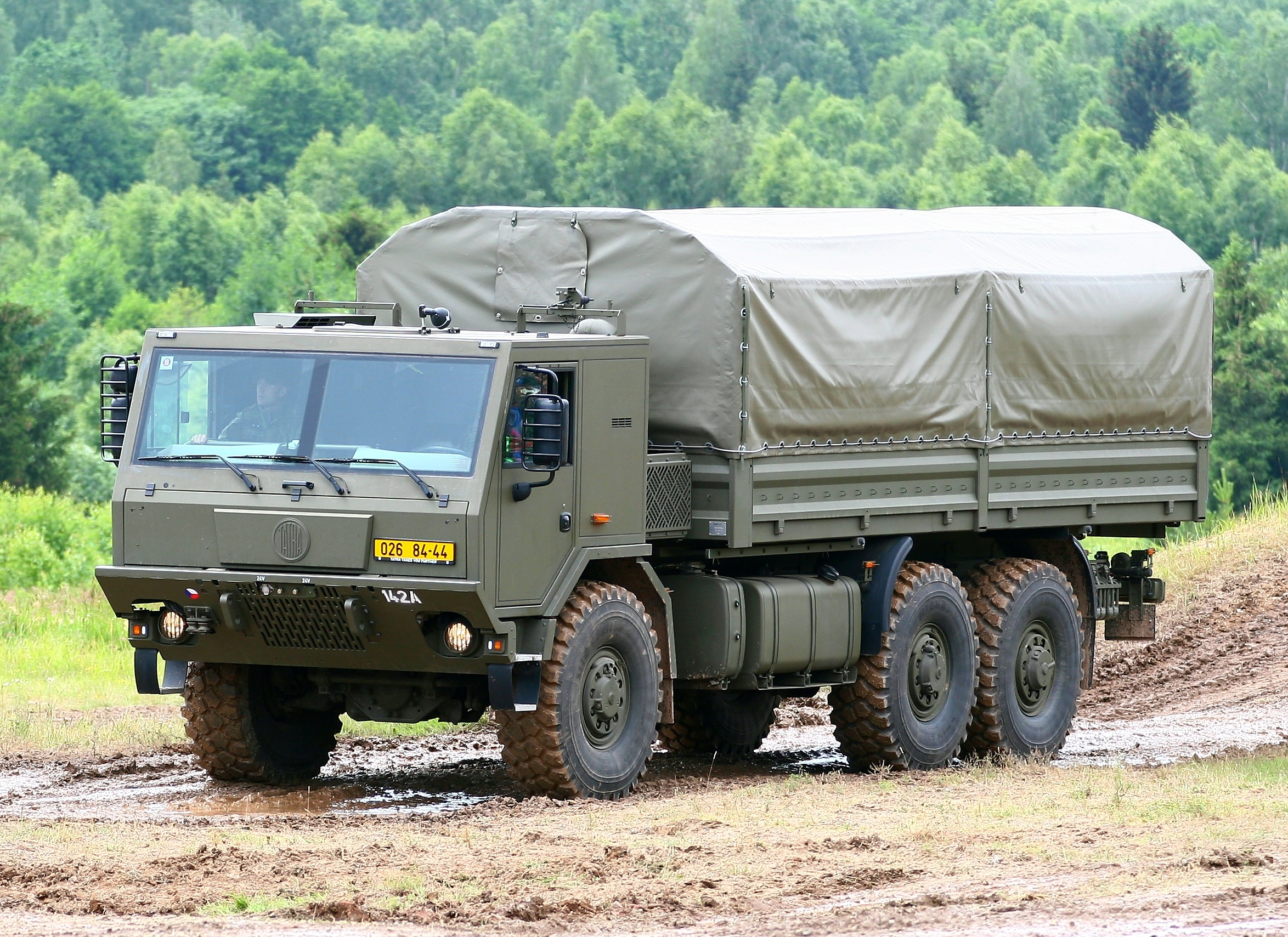

Overview
- Manufacturer: Tatra
- Production: 2007–present
- Assembly: Kopřivnice, Moravia, Czech Republic

Body and chassis
- Class: Heavy truck
- Platform: Tatra backbone tube chassis
- Related: Tatra 158 Phoenix

Powertrain
- Engine: Air-cooled: Turbo-diesel Tatra T3 V8 engines, up to 368 kW (493 hp); Turbo-diesel Tatra V12 engines, up to 515 kW (691 hp) Liquid cooled: Cummins engines, up to 447 kW (599 hp); Caterpillar Inc. engines

Dimensions
- Wheelbase: 1,450 mm (57.1 in); 1,950 mm (76.8 in); 2,860 mm (112.6 in)
- Length: 9,470 mm (372.8 in)
- Width: 2,550 mm (100.4 in)
- Height: 2,730 mm (107.5 in)
- Curb weight: 13,300 kg (29,300 lb)

Chronology
- Predecessor: Tatra 815

The Tatra 815-7 (also known as Tatra 817, T817 or Tatra Force) is a heavy army logistics vehicle made by the Czech company Tatra produced since 2007. T817 is primarily intended for military operators and for specialist roles in civilian sector (with Tatra 158 Phoenix being the company's primary general-purpose truck for civilian sector). The truck is made primarily with axle variations of 4×4, 6×6, 8×8 and 10×10. Other chassis variants up to 16×16 are also available.

== History ==
=== First generation (2007–2016) ===
In 2004, Tatra introduced a prototype of the new 817 line of trucks after presenting a 4×4 NATO C-130 Hercules transportable military truck. The prototype was based on Tatra's traditional backbone chassis, with a water cooled Cummins engine and a ZF transmission. Even though the truck was being developed as an entirely new line, the company decided to formally introduce it to the market under the 815-7 designation as a new version of the Tatra 815, in order to undergo a simplified homologation process.

The Tatra 817 entered serial production in 2007. This serial version offered a large extent of modularity for chassis components, engines (air-cooled Tatra or water-cooled Cummins), transmissions (manual, semi-automatic, automatic), and a cabin that allows the simple addition of armor components in line with the STANAG 4569 standard. Cab tightness allowed for the use of overpressure filtering.

While originally intended for military operators, the truck has been offered to civilian customers since 2010, particularly for specialist purposes such as firefighting.

=== Second generation (2016–2023) ===
The second generation T817 was introduced in 2016. Its cabin was modernized and a four-door long cab version was introduced. The chassis was modernized and unified with the Tatra 158 Phoenix. Apart from a standard cab, the truck was now offered with a high level of protection of armored cabs produced by sister company Tatra Defence Vehicles.

=== Third generation (since 2023) ===
In May 2023, at the PYROS expo, the third generation T817 was introduced when two fire trucks were presented to the public. This new version offers a modernized cabin coupled with a modified position of the engine. The new four-door cabin offers enough space for up to eight crewmen in three rows.

Tatra air-cooled V8 engines were also modernized, offering up to 368 kW of power output. With the third generation, Tatra re-introduced its previously discontinued air-cooled V12 engine, offering up to 515 kW of power output. The third generation continues to be available with a line of water-cooled Cummins engines. At the time of introduction, a hydrogen powered version was under development.

== Users ==
Tatra 817 standard trucks serve in the Army of the Czech Republic, Slovakia and Croatia, while 817 chassis with specialist superstructures (e.g., artillery cannon, rocket launcher, armored recovery vehicle, etc.) serve also in many other countries. It is also used in the civilian sector, especially in applications that particularly benefit from the truck's lower center of gravity, such as mobile cranes and fire trucks.

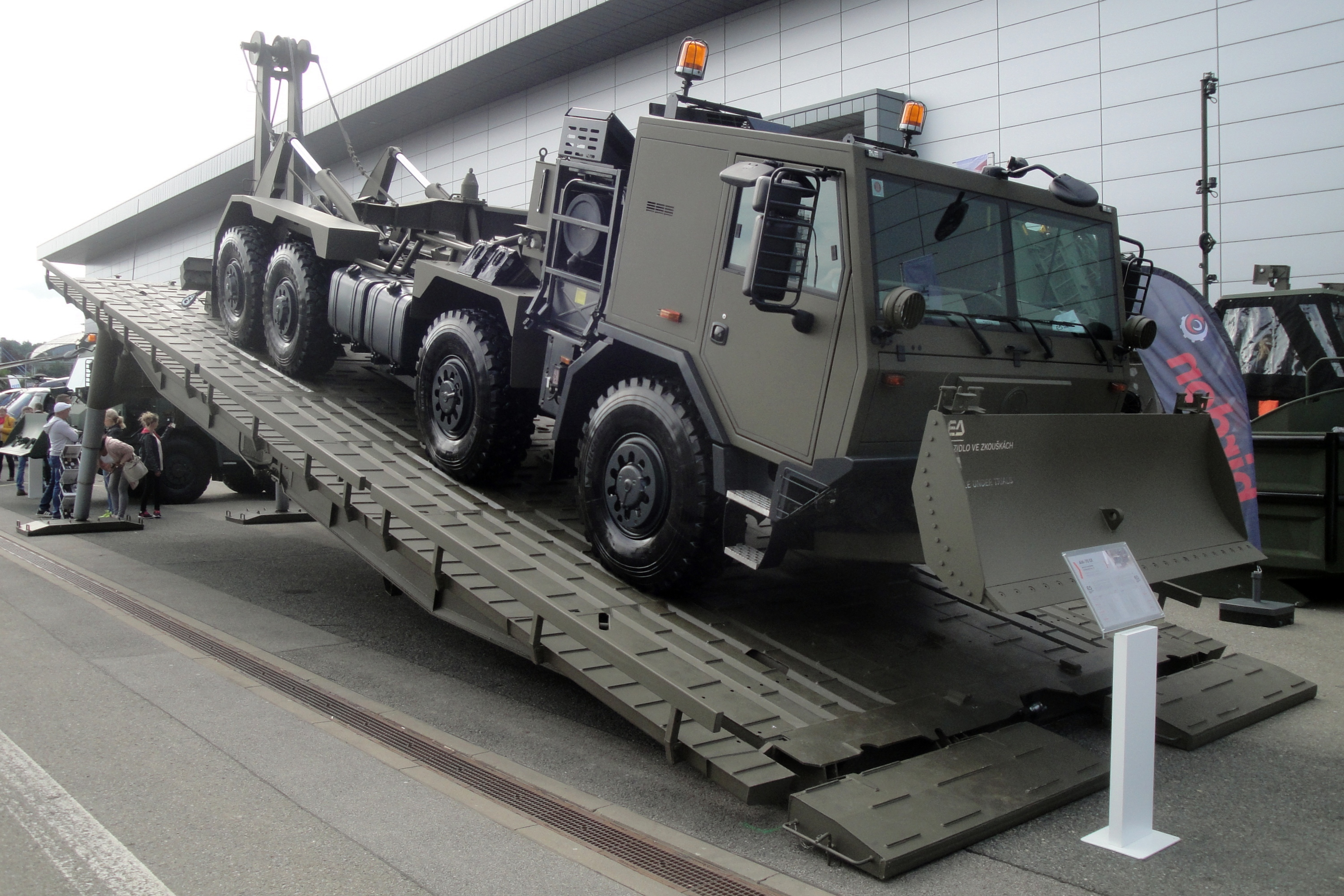
8×8 bridge layer

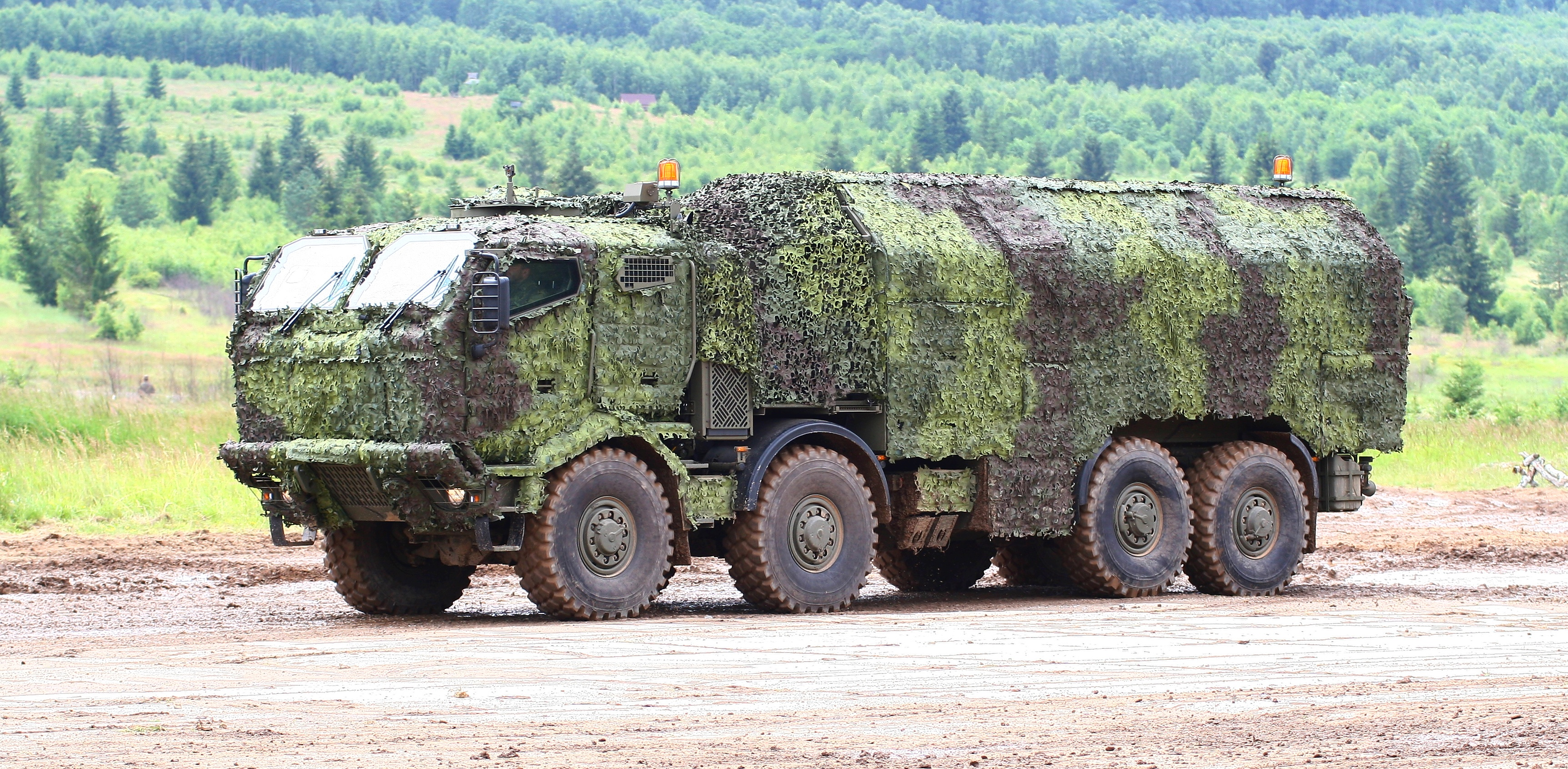
8×8 army truck with armored cab

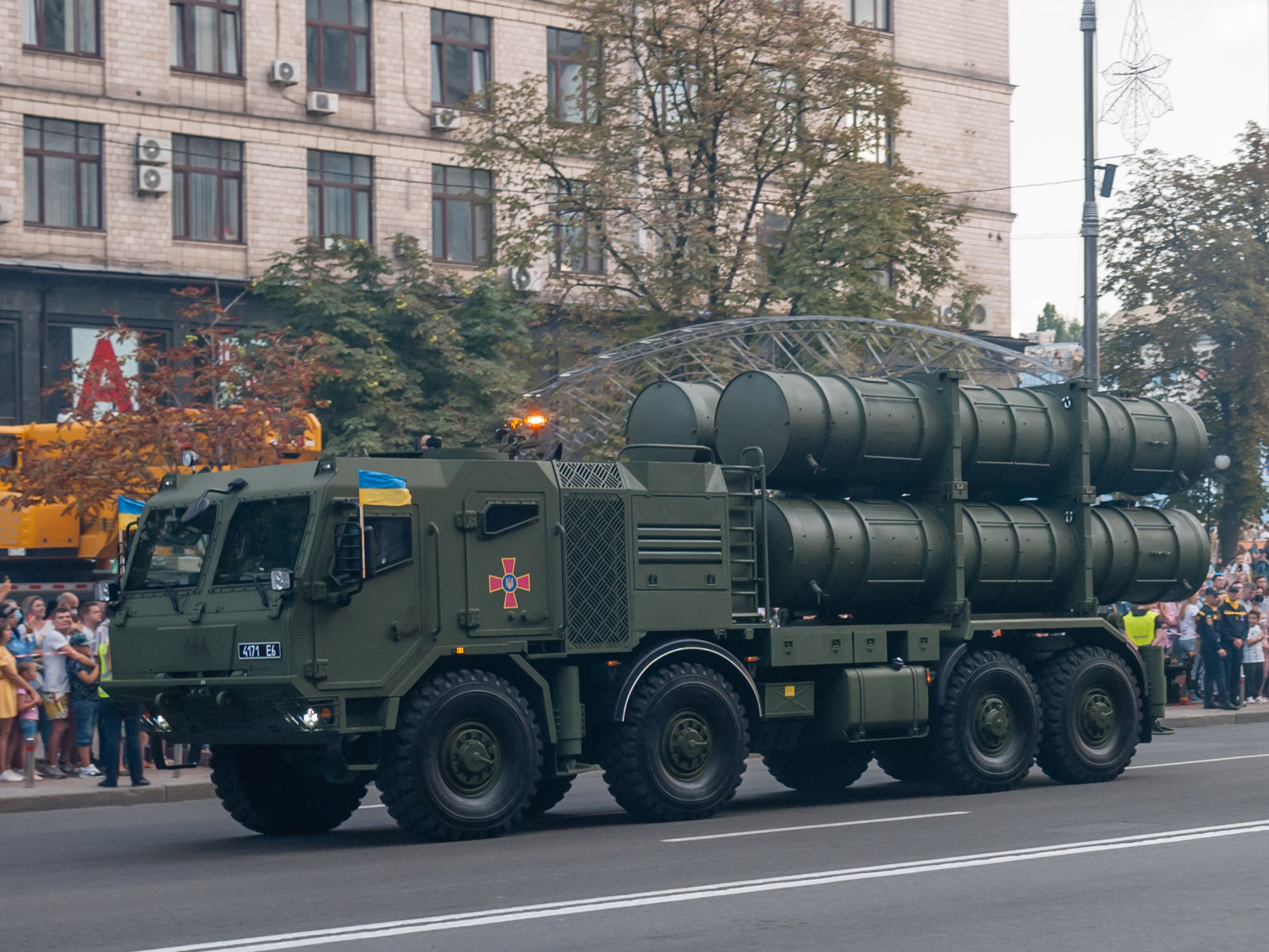
8×8 Neptune anti-ship system (Ukraine)

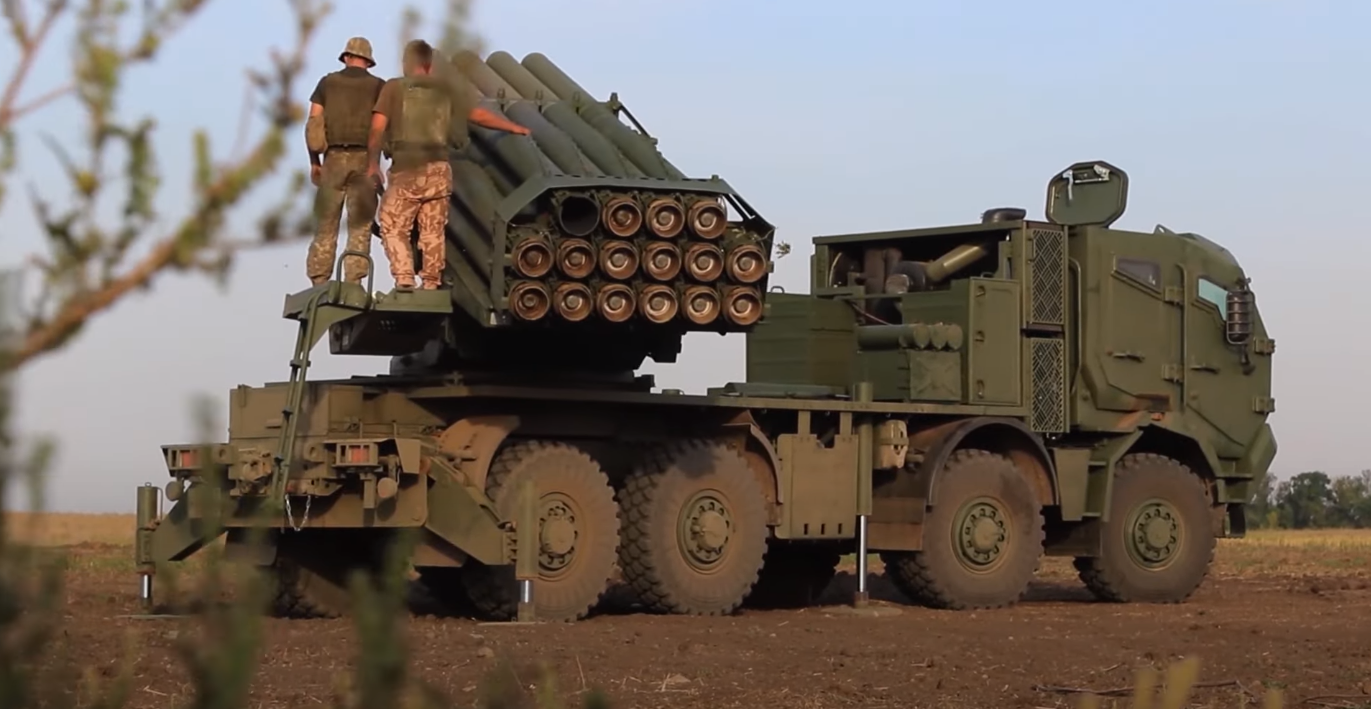
8×8 Bureviy rocket system
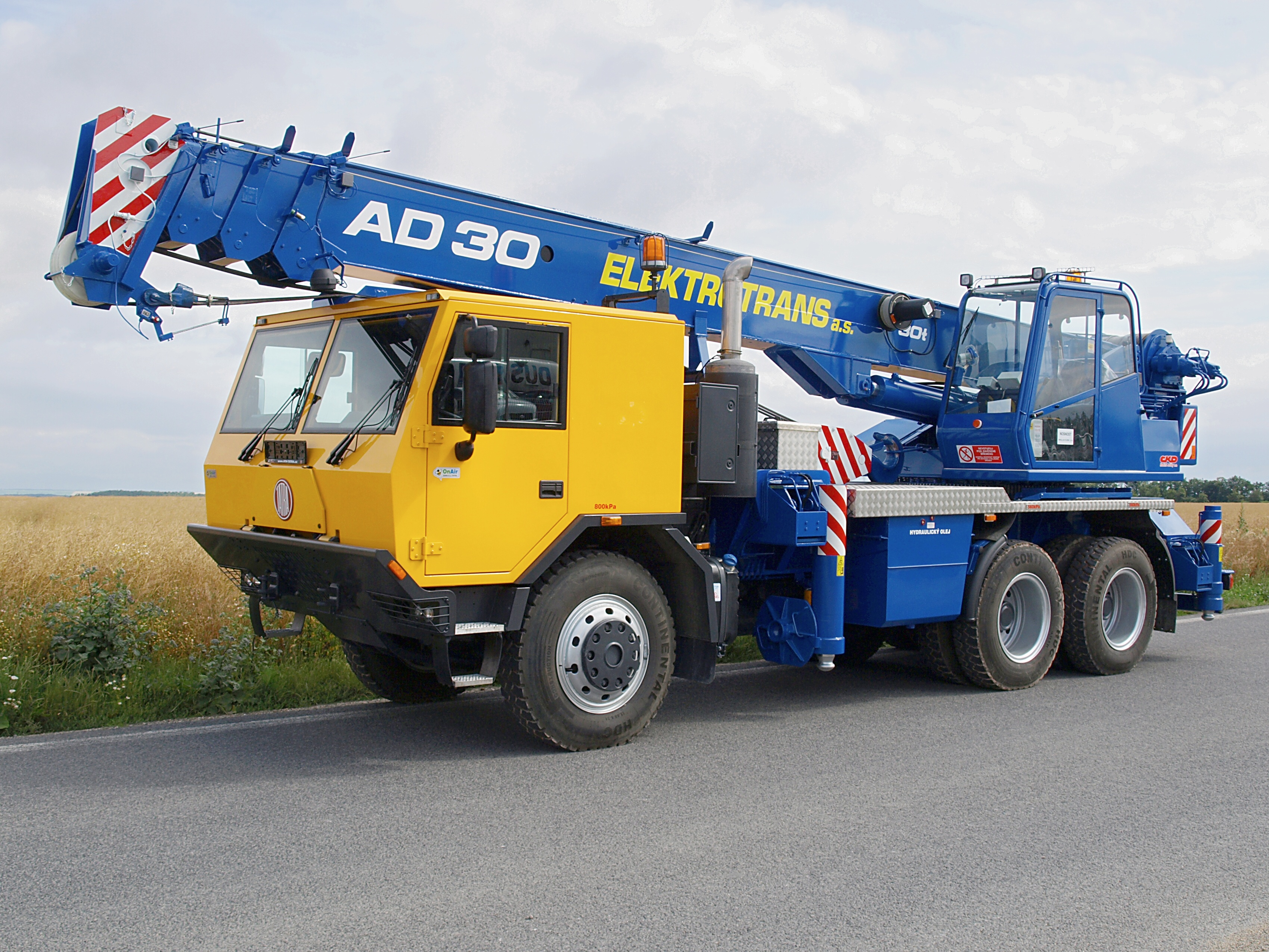
6×6 mobile crane

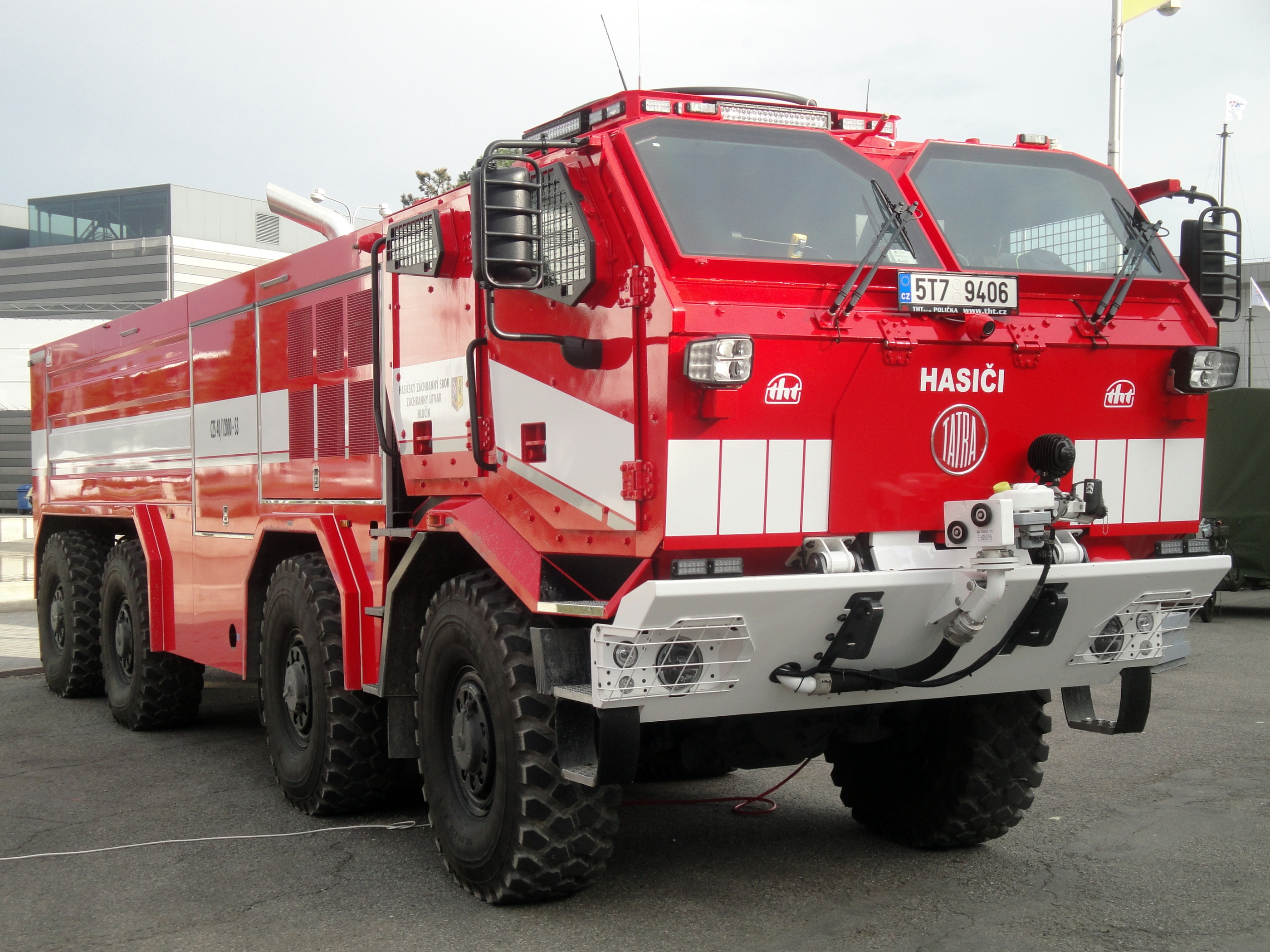
8×8 protected cab fire truck (Czech Republic)

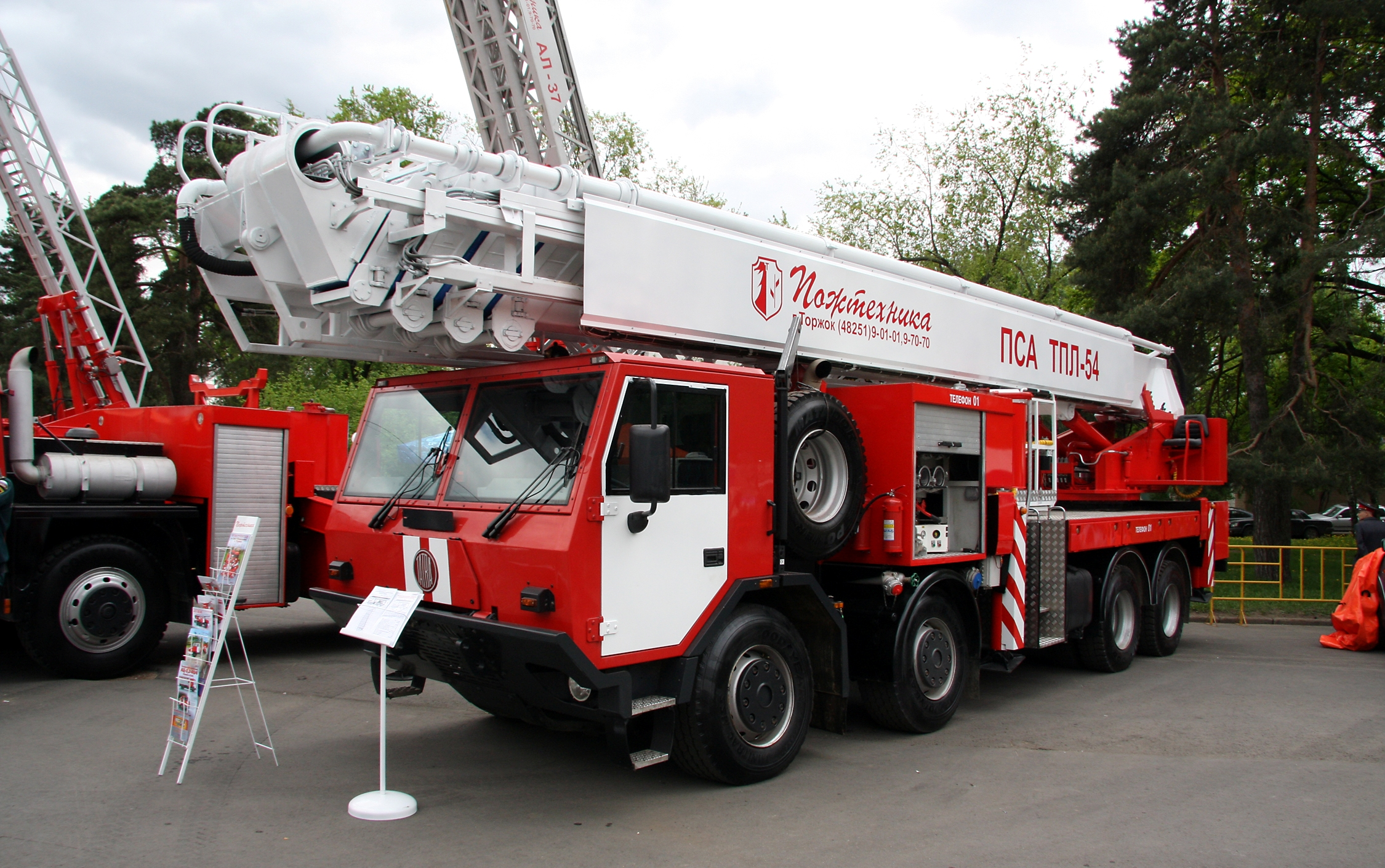
8×8 fire truck with ladder extension (Russia)

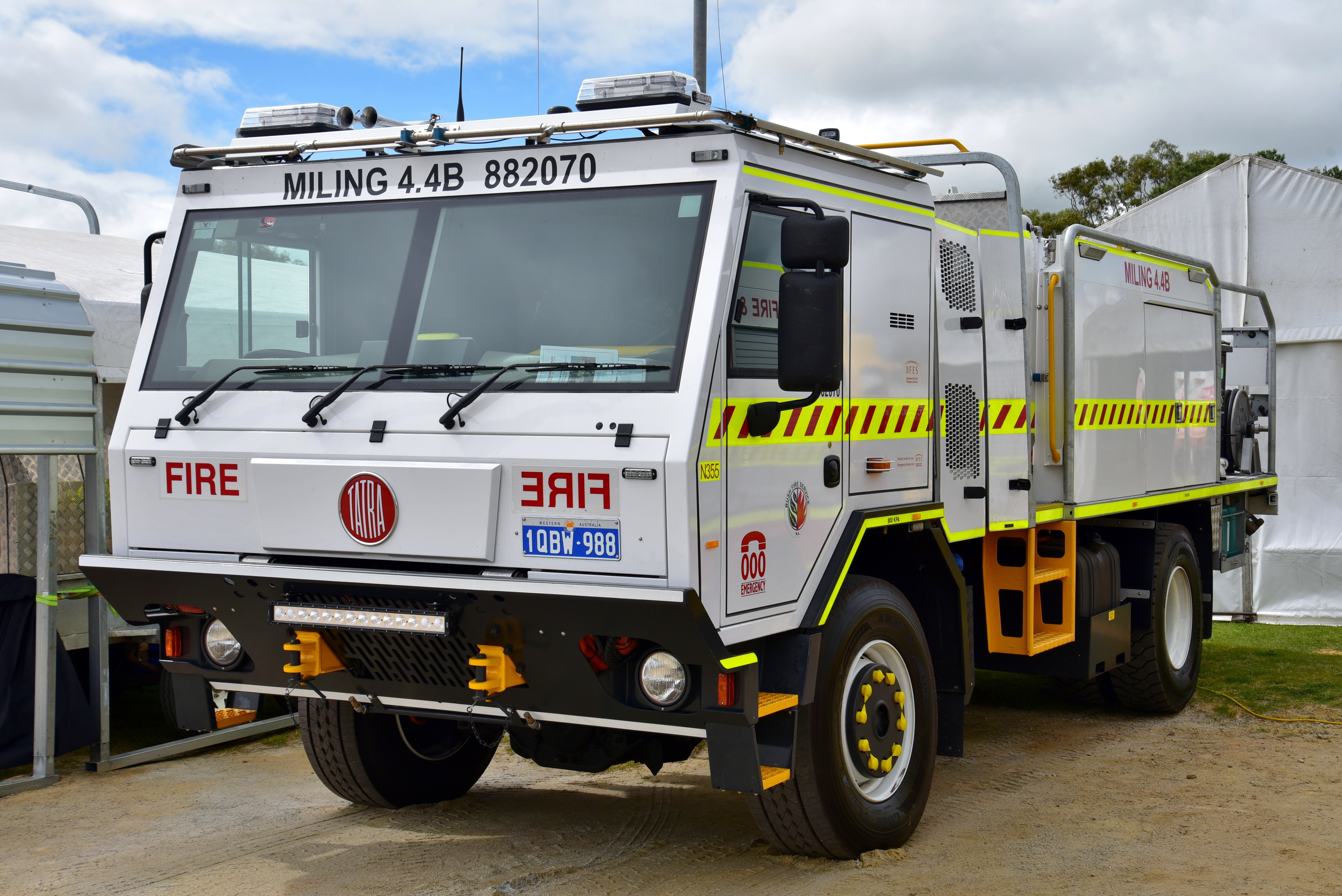
4×4 fire truck (Australia)

== Specifications ==
- Motor: air cooled, turbocharged Tatra T3C-928-90 V8
- Displacement: 12,667 cc
- Max. power: 300 kW (402 hp) @ 1800 rpm
- Max. torque: 2,100 N⋅m (1,500 ft⋅lbf) @ 1000 rpm
- Top speed: 115 km/h
- Fuel tank capacity: 420 l
- Cruising range: 750 km
- Angle of approach/departure: 45°/42°
- Fording depth: 1.5 m

== T817 chassis military applications ==
The T817 uses a traditional Tatra backbone tube chassis instead of the more typical truck ladder frame. The chassis is designed primarily for off-road applications, which gives it a comparative advantage over trucks primarily intended for roads that were modified for offroad use.

As such, Tatra Czech manufactured the T817 chassis to be used as the basis of other specialist vehicles made in a number of countries.

=== APC and MRAP vehicles ===
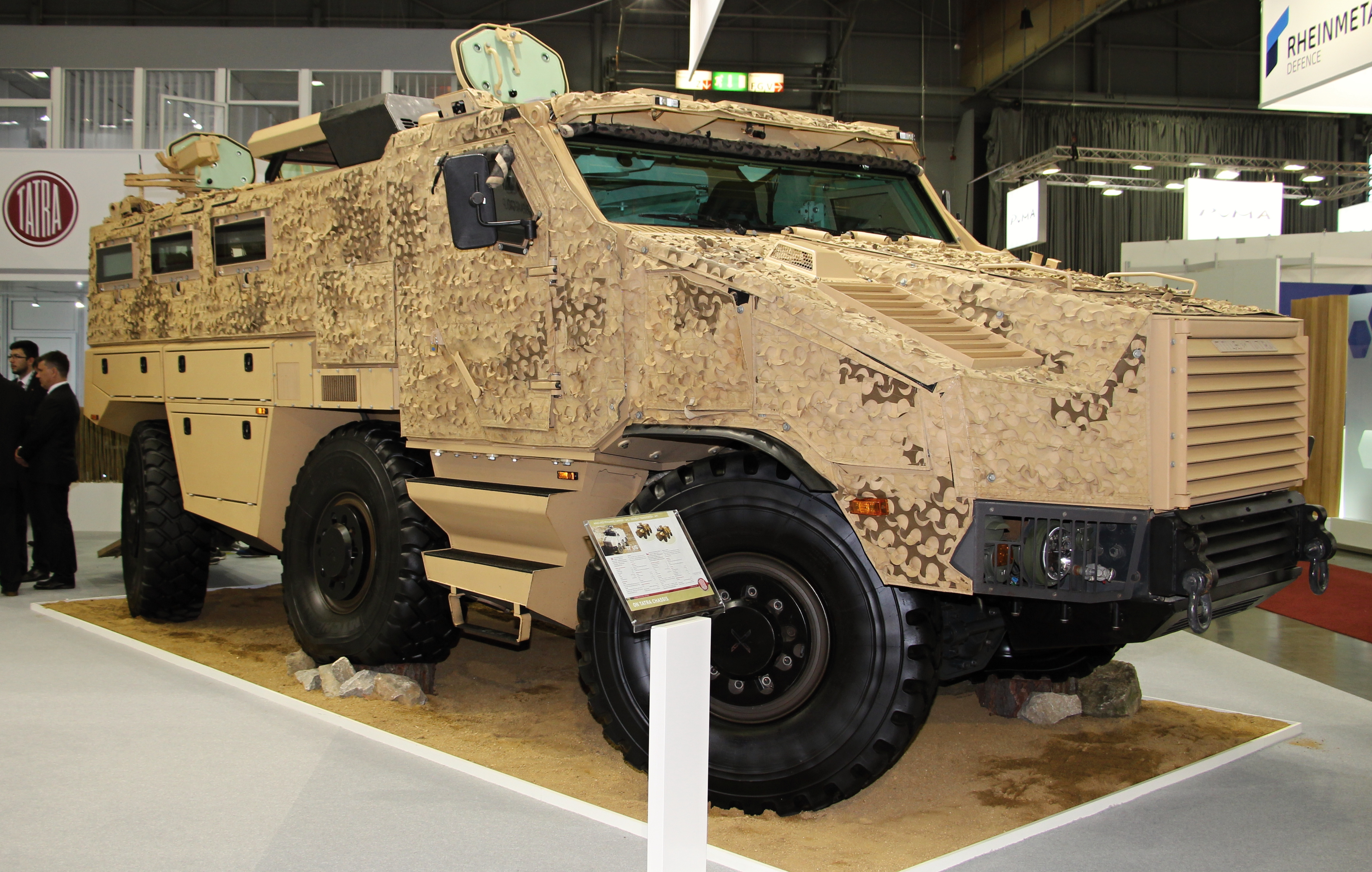
Nexter Titus 6×6 infantry mobility vehicle

The following armoured personnel carriers and mine-resistant ambush protected vehicles use T817 chassis:

- (Niger) Ara made by Proforce.
- (Egypt) Fahd 300 made by Arab Organization for Industrialization.
- (Czech Republic) Vega, also known as ATLAV 1, made by SVOS, spol. s r.o.
- (United Arab Emirates) Legion made by Isotrex Manufacturing FZE.
- al-Mared made by Jordan Manufacturing and Services Solutions.
- (Czech Republic) (France) Nexter Titus, made by Nexter Systems and Tatra
- (Czech Republic) Patriot, also known as Husar, made by Excalibur Army and HCP
  - (Poland) Waran, Patriot II derivative made under license by Huta Stalowa Wola for Polish Army, initially under the Autosan brand
- (United Arab Emirates) al-Wahsh made by Jordan Light Vehicle Manufacturing LLC
- Wildcat made by Israel Military Industries

=== Self-propelled artillery ===
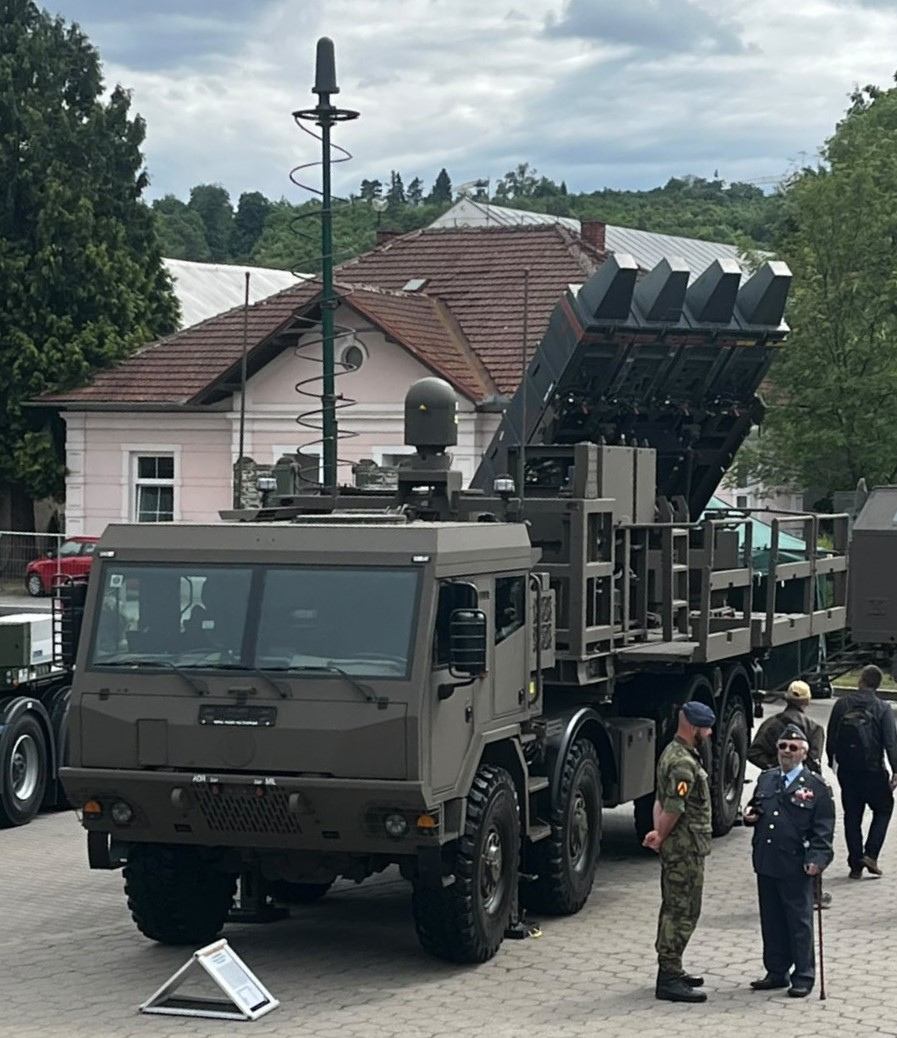
SPYDER Air Defense System

MORANA 8×8 SPG

- (Israel) ATMOS 2000 made by Elbit Systems (versions for Thailand and Zambia).
- (Ukraine) 2S22 Bohdana made by Kharkiv Tractor Plant
- (France) CAESAR made by Nexter Systems.
- (Czech Republic) Dita made by Excalibur Army.
- (Slovakia) EVA made by Závody ťažkého strojárstva Dubnica nad Váhom.
- (South Korea) K9MH made by Hanwha Aerospace
- (Czech Republic) Morana made by Excalibur Army.
- (South Africa) T5-52 Condor made by Denel Land Systems.
- (Slovakia) Zuzana 2 made by Závody ťažkého strojárstva Dubnica nad Váhom
- (Slovakia) SAM120 made by ZŤS Špeciál.

=== Rocket systems ===
- (Brazil) Astros II made by Avibras.
- (Czech Republic) BM-21 MT made by Excalibur Army.
- (Ukraine) Bureviy made by Ukroboronprom.
- (Turkey) Bora/Khan Made by Roketsan
- (Ukraine) Neptune made by Luch Design Bureau.
- (Israel) PULS Precise & Universal Launching Systems made by Elbit Systems.
- (Czech Republic) RM 70 Vampire made by Excalibur Army.

=== Air defense systems ===
- (Azerbaijan) CWS-30GD Viking made by Azersilah.
- (Israel) SPYDER made by Rafael Advanced Defense Systems.
