= Astros II =

Brazilian long-range multiple launch rocket system

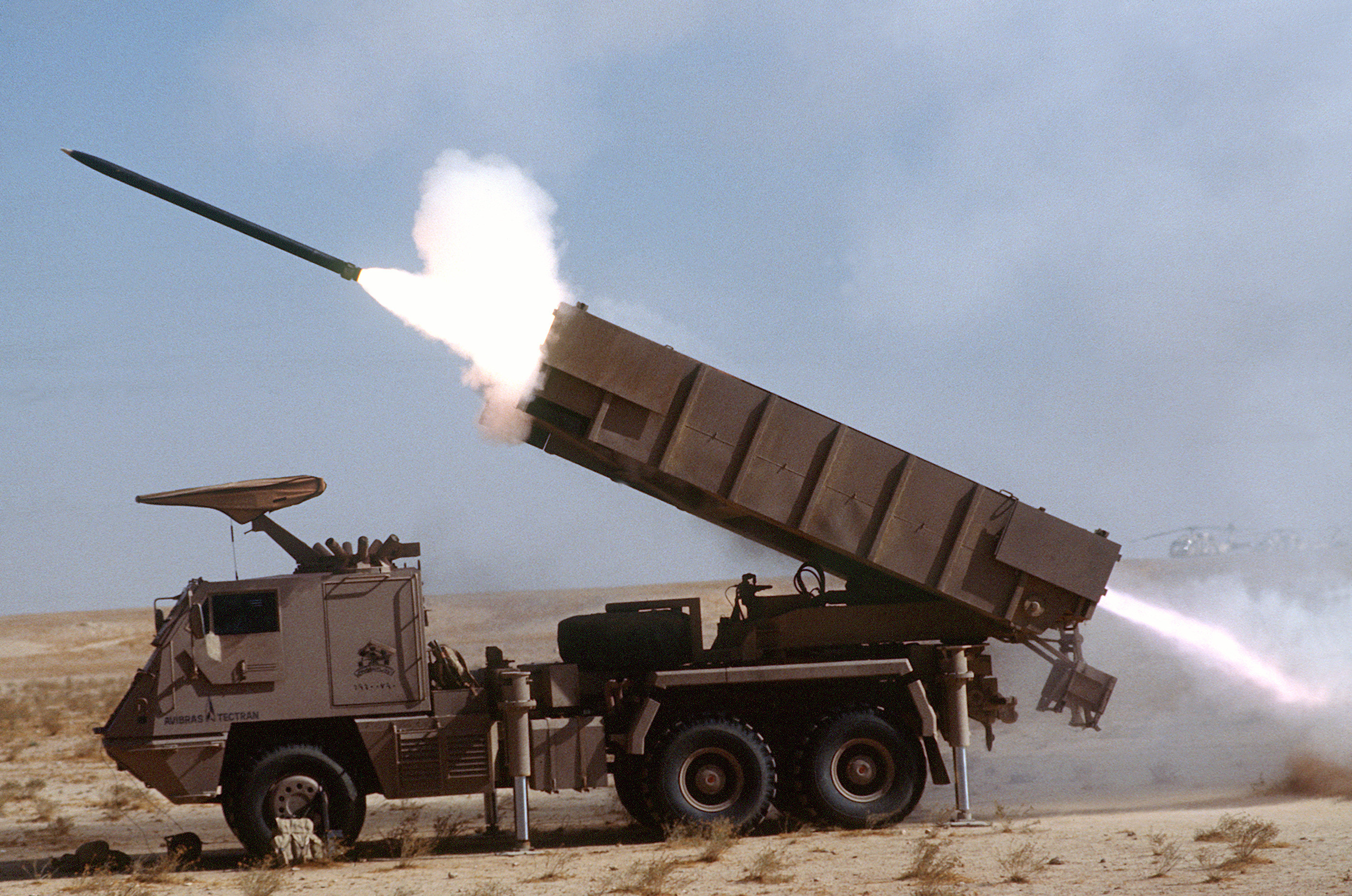
- ASTROS II launching SS-30 Rocket
- Type: Multiple rocket launcher
- Place of origin: Brazil

Service history
- In service: 1983-present
- Used by: See Operators
- Wars: Iran–Iraq War; Gulf War; Angolan Civil War; Yemeni Civil War (2015–present); Military Intervention in Yemen

Production history
- Manufacturer: Avibras
- No. built: 270+

Specifications
- Mass: 10,000 kg 27,000 kg (MK6)
- Length: 7 m (20 ft)
- Width: 2.9 m (9 ft 6 in)
- Height: 2.6 m (8 ft 6 in)
- Crew: 3
- Shell: Rocket length: 4.20 m (13 ft 9 in); Rocket weight: 152 kg (335 lb)
- Caliber: 450mm (7.08in)
- Maximum firing range: 30 (SS-30) to 300 km (AV-TM 300)
- Main armament: Universal Multiple Launcher Module 127–450 mm
- Secondary armament: 1 × 12.7 mm M2 Browning machine gun
- Engine: Mercedes OM422 8-cylinder diesel 280 hp (209 kW)
- Suspension: 6×6
- Operational range: 500 Km
- Maximum speed: 100 Km/h

Astros II (Artillery SaTuration ROcket System) is a self-propelled multiple rocket launcher produced in Brazil by the Avibras company. It features modular design and employs rockets with calibers ranging from 127 to 450 mm (5–17.72 inches). It was developed on the basis of a Tectran VBT-2028 6×6 all-terrain vehicle for enhanced mobility based on Mercedes-Benz 2028 truck chassis while later versions use Tatra 815-7 chassis.

== Overview ==
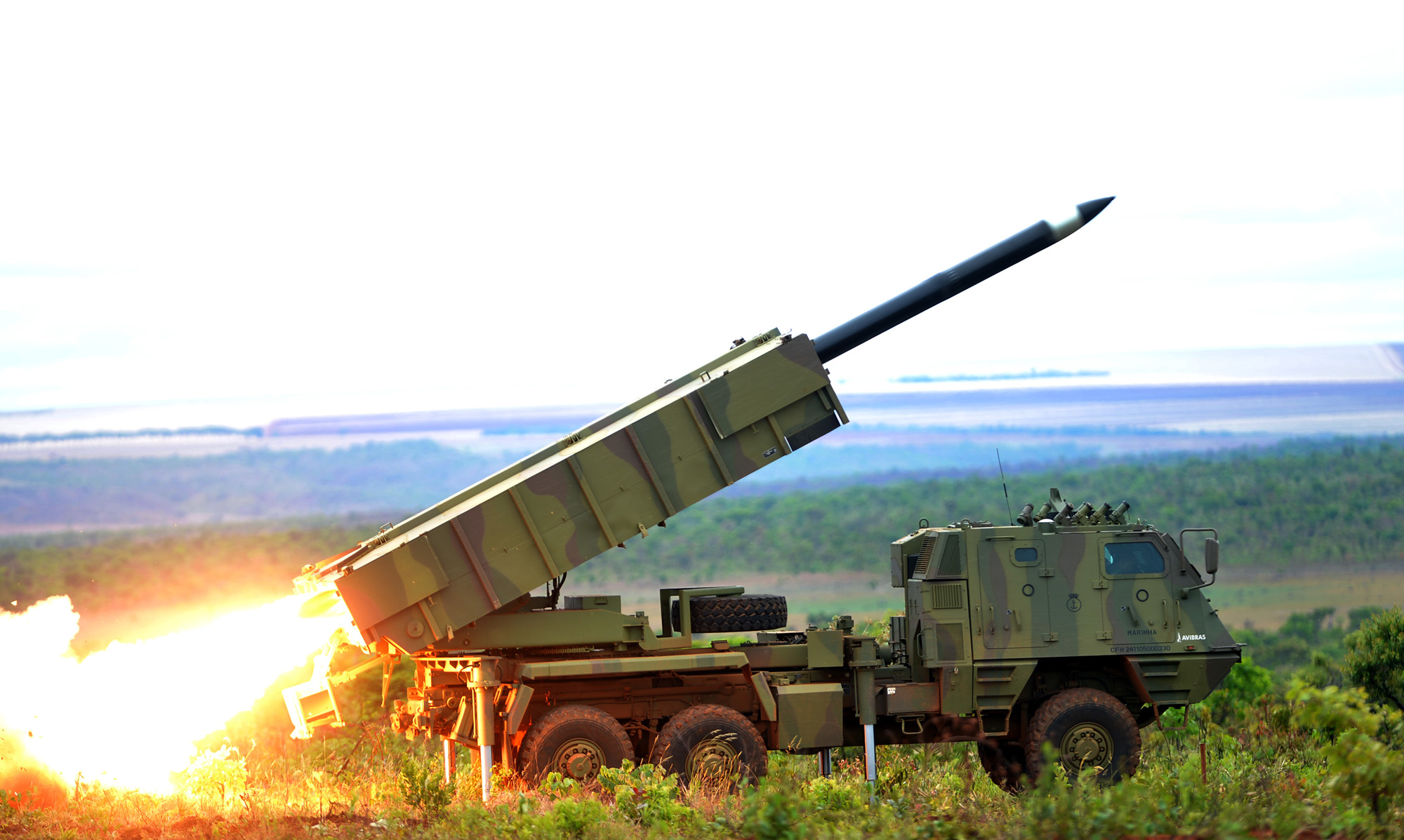
Astros II MK6 Brazilian Marine Corps.

A full Astros system includes 1 wheeled 4×4 Battalion level Command Vehicle (AV-VCC), which commands 3 batteries, and a series of 4×4 and 6×6 wheeled vehicles. Each battery consists of:

- 1 wheeled 4×4 Battery-level Command vehicle (AV-PCC)
- 1 wheeled 6×6 Radar Fire Control vehicle (AV-UCF)
- 6 wheeled 6×6 Universal Multiple Rocket Launchers vehicle (AV-LMU)
- 3 wheeled 6×6 Ammunition Resupply vehicles (AV-RMD)
- 1 wheeled 6×6 Field repair/workshop vehicle (AV-OFVE)
- 1 wheeled 4×4 Mobile Weather Station vehicle (AV-MET).

In the older version of the system, the fire control vehicle were listed as optional vehicle in a battery. The command vehicles and weather stations are recent additions, designed to improve overall system performance on newer versions. All vehicles are transportable in a C-130 Hercules. The launcher is capable of firing rockets of different calibers armed with a range of warheads.

Each rocket resupply truck carries up to two complete reloads.

== Service history ==
The Astros II artillery system entered service with the Brazilian Army in the early 1990s. The system is battle proven, having been used in action by the Iraqi Army in the Gulf Wars.

In the 1980s, Avibrás sold an estimated 66 Astros II artillery systems to Iraq. Iraq also built the Sajeel-60 which is a license-built version of the Brazilian SS-60. Sixty Astros II were sold to Saudi Arabia and an unspecified number sold to Bahrain and Qatar. Total sales of the Astros II between 1982 and 1987 reached US$1 billion. This fact made the Astros II multiple rocket launcher the most profitable weapon produced by Avibrás.

In the 1980s and early 1990s, Avibrás manufactured almost exclusively rockets and multiple-launch rocket systems (MLRS), such as the Astros II, in addition to developing antitank and antiship missiles. At its peak, Avibrás employed 6,000 people; later it would be reduced to 900 people in the early 1990s as the arms industry demand fell. Even so, in the first Gulf War in 1991, the Astros II was successfully used by Saudi Arabia against Iraq. The Astros II system was also procured by Angola during the 1990s, for use against UNITA guerillas.

== New generation ==
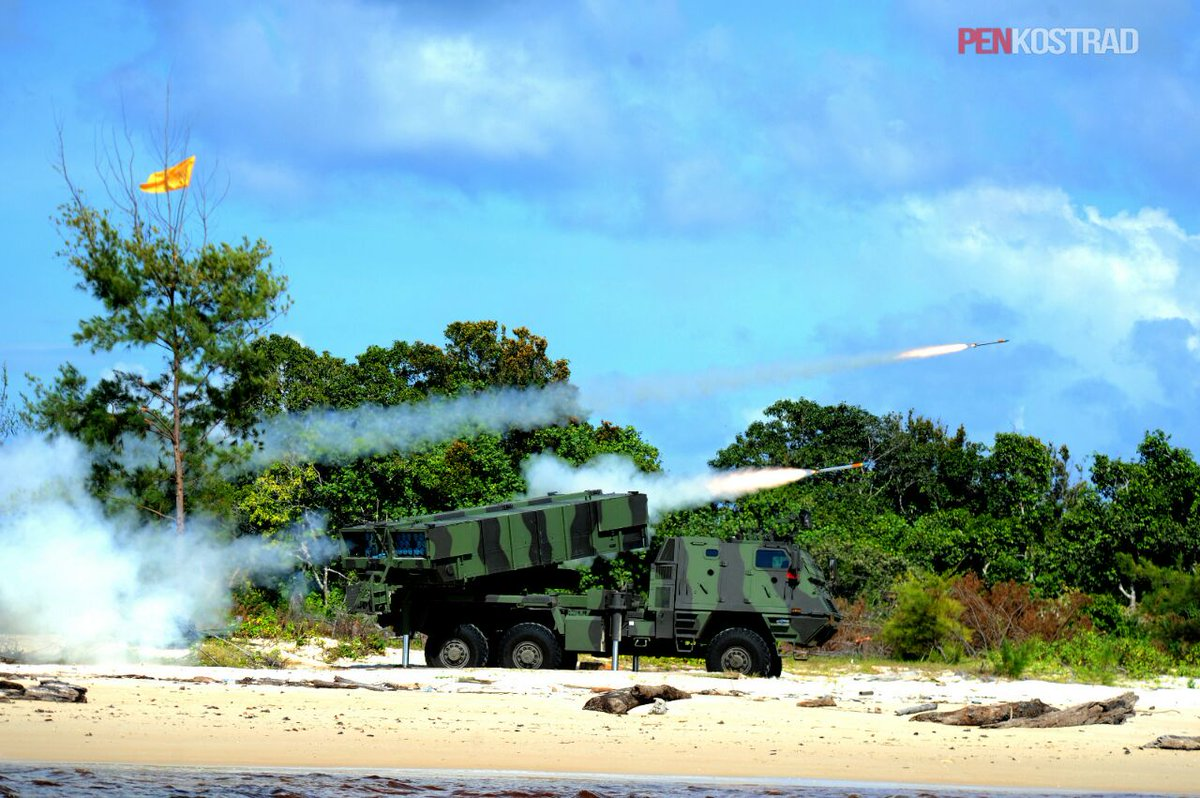
Astros II Mk6 of Indonesian Army firing SS-09TS rocket.

The next step is an ambitious program, the Astros 2020 (Mk6), based on a 6×6 wheeled chassis. Being a new concept, it will require an estimated investment of R$1.2 billion, of which about US$210 million will be invested solely in development. It will be integrated with the cruise missile AVMT-300 with 300-km range during the stage of testing and certification. It is said that the venture will, for example, enable the Army to integrate the Astros with defense anti-aircraft guns, paving the way for the utilization of common platforms, trucks, parts of electronic sensors and command vehicles. The new MK6 system will use Tatra Trucks’ T815-790R39 6×6 and T815-7A0R59 4×4 trucks instead of the original Mercedes-Benz 2028A 6×6 truck. ASTROS 2020 offers several basic improvements including an improved armored cabin, modern digital communications and navigation systems, and a new tracking radar that replaces the AV-UCF's Contraves Fieldguard system. The new tracking radar used by MK6 AV-UCF was later revealed to be the Fieldguard 3 Military Measurement System from Rheinmetall Air Defence. The Astros 2020 will also be equipped with a 180 mm GPS-guided rocket called the SS-AV-40G with a range of 40 km (25 mi) and SS-150 newly developed rockets with a claimed maximum range of 150 km. Four of them are carried. 36 Astros 2020 systems are to be acquired.

== Rocket variants ==
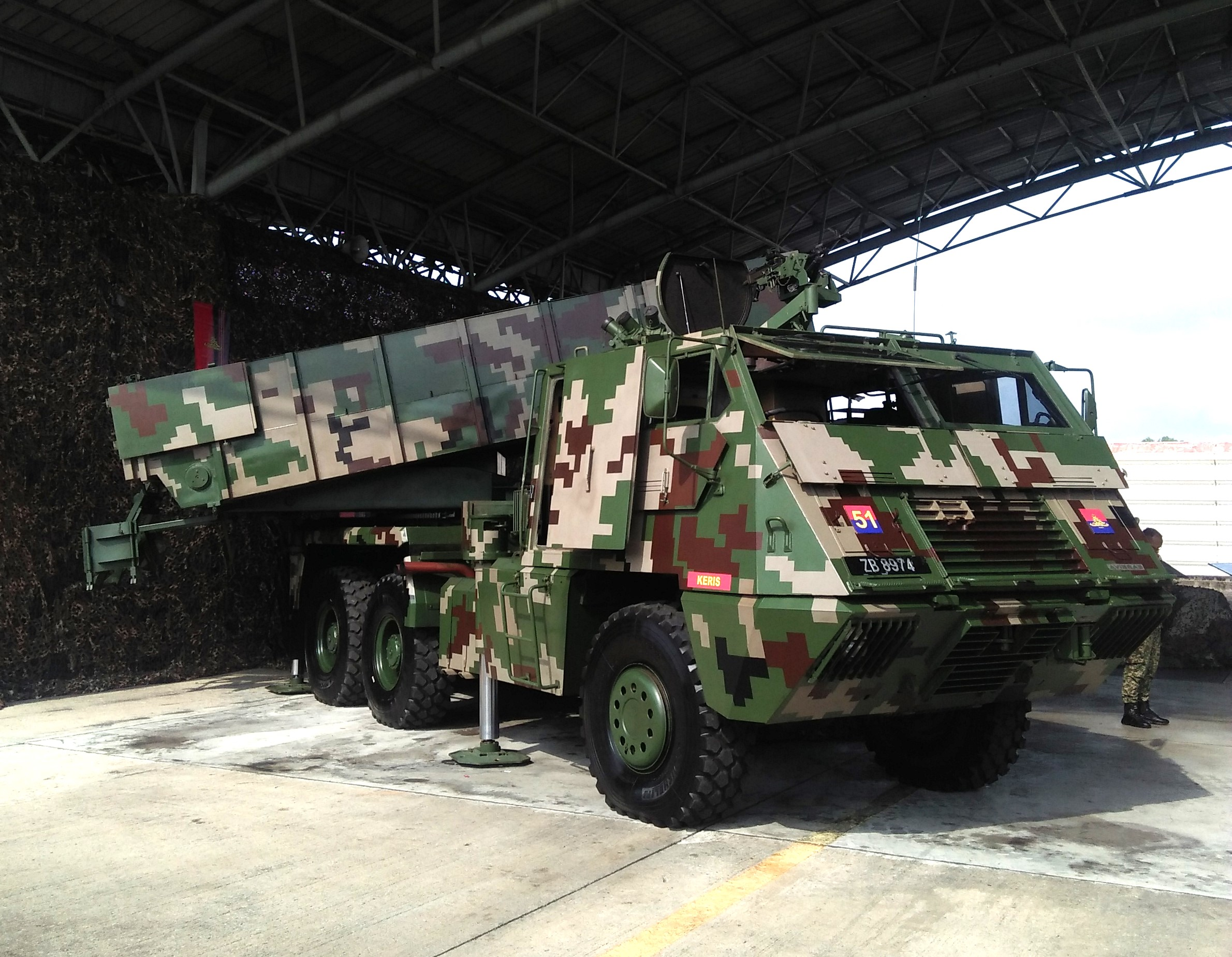
Astros II in Malaysian Army digital camouflage.

- SS-09TS – fires 70 mm rockets – Loads 40
- SS-30 – fires 127 mm rockets – Loads 32
- SS-40 – fires 180 mm rockets – Loads 16
- SS-40G – fires 180 mm rockets – Loads 16 (GPS Guided)
- SS-60 – fires 300 mm rockets – Loads 4
- SS-80 – fires 300 mm rockets – Loads 4
- SS-80G – fires 300 mm rockets – Loads 4 (GPS Guided)
- SS-150 – fires 450 mm rockets – Loads 4 (GPS Guided)
- MANSUP – fires 330 mm anti-ship missile – Loads 2
- AV-TM 300 – fires 450 mm cruise missile – Loads 2
- FOG MPM – fiber optics guided multi-purpose missile – anti-tank, anti-fortification and anti-helicopter missile
- FOG MLM – fiber optics guided multi-purpose missile

== Specifications ==
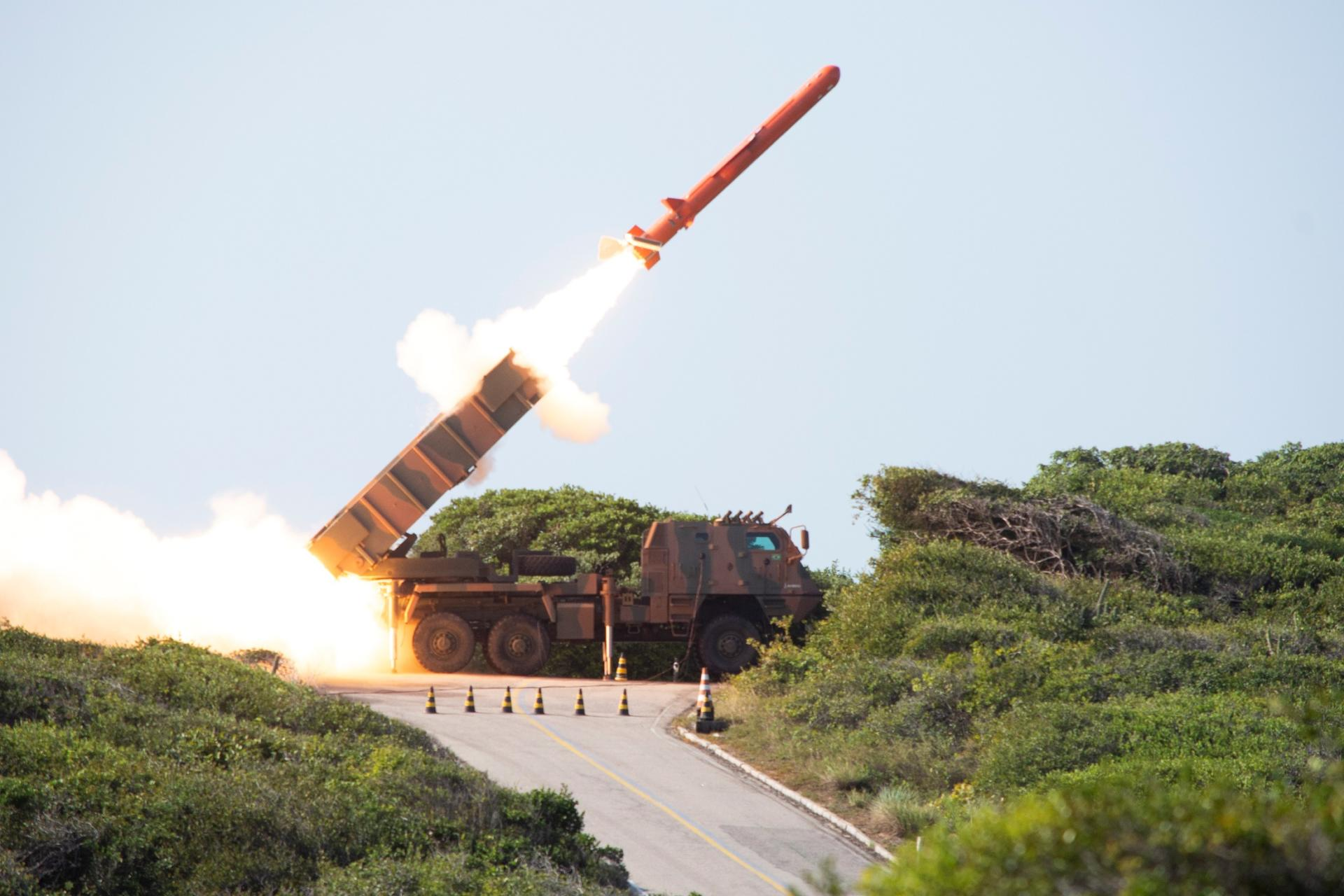
Astros II MK6 Brazilian Army launcing AV-TM 300 .

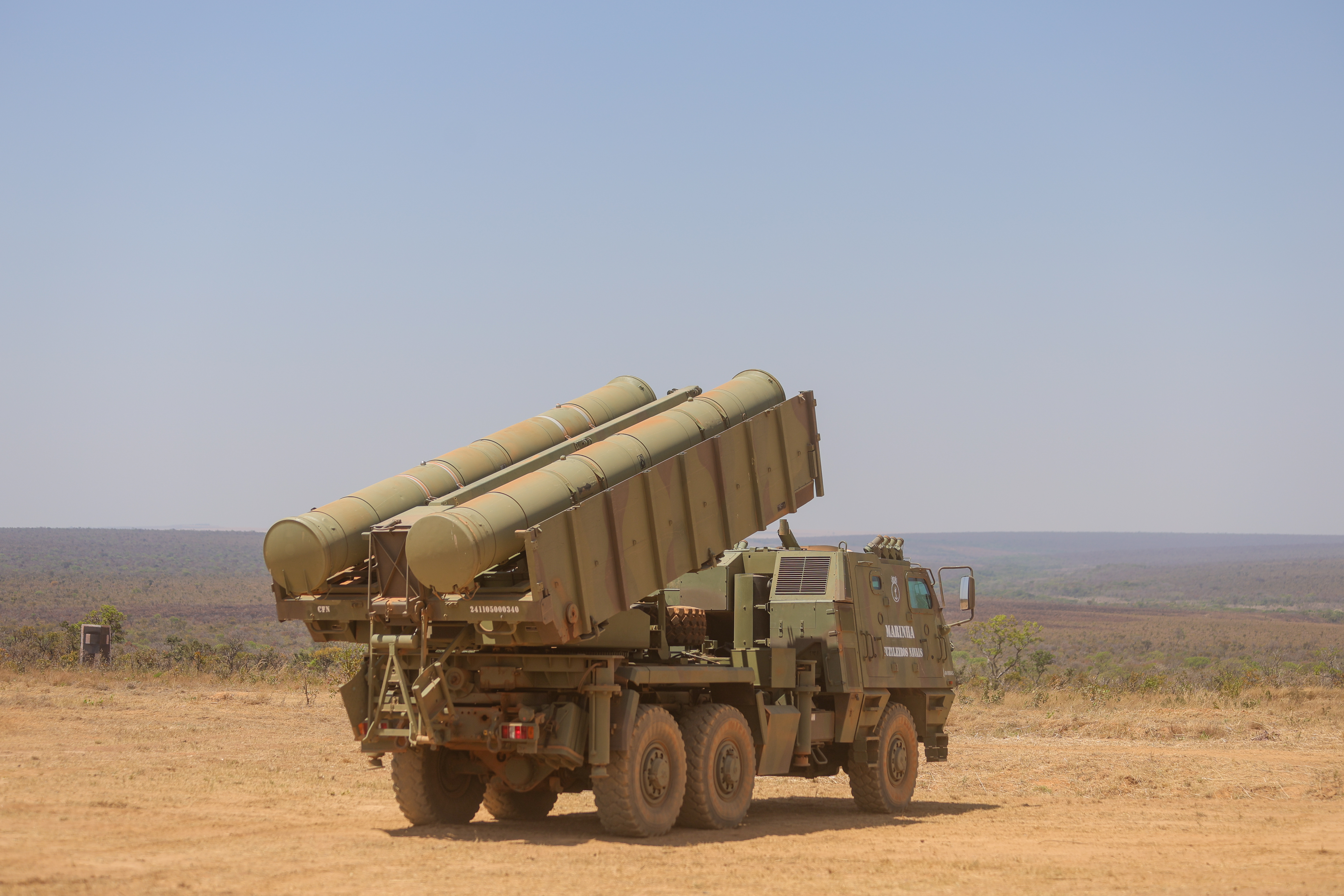
Astros system fitted for MANSUP anti-ship missile.

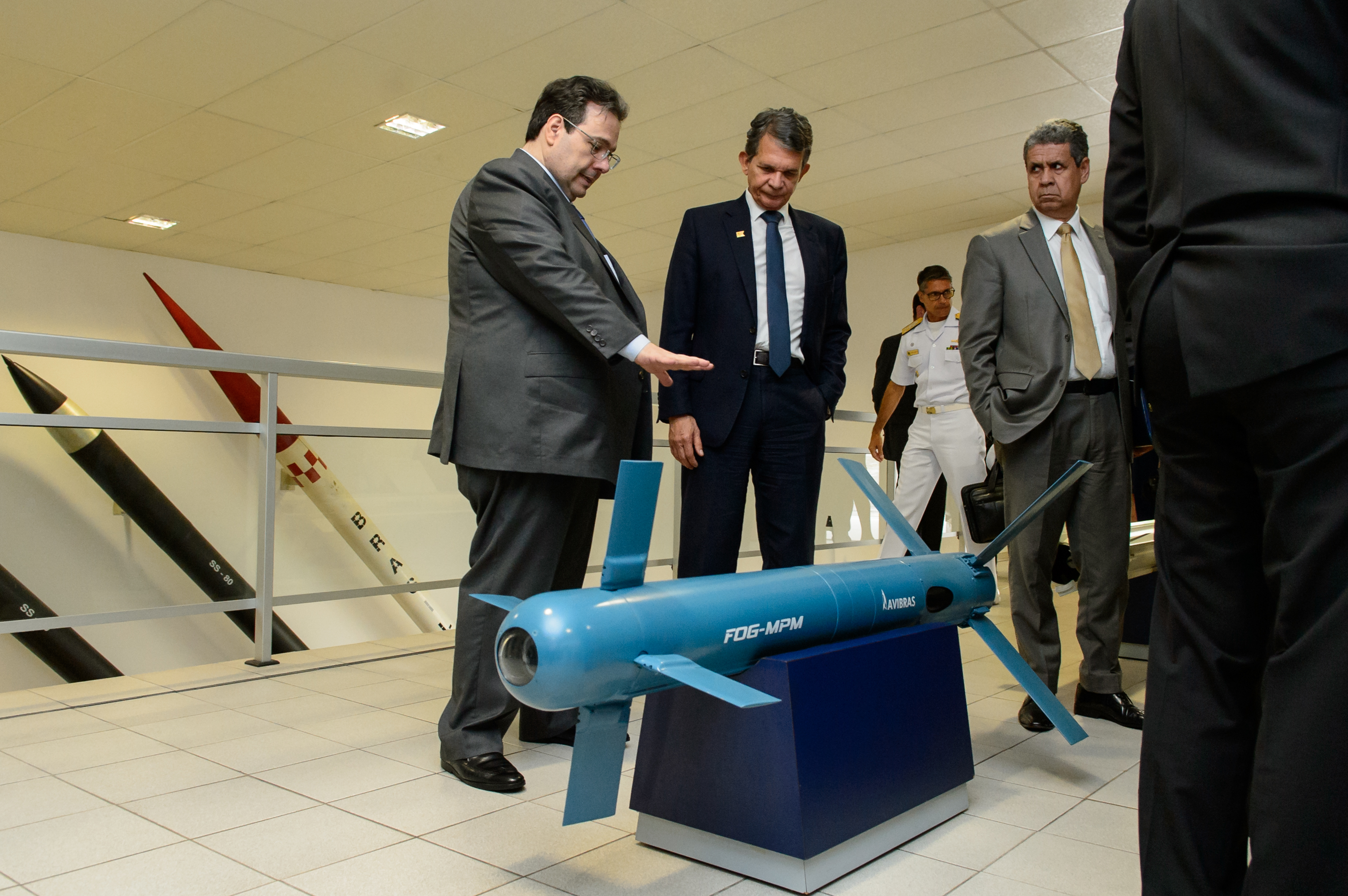
FOG-MPM.

- Range in indirect fire mode (first figure is minimum range):
  - SS-09TS: 4–10 km
  - SS-30: 9–30 km
  - SS-40: 15–40 km
  - SS-40G: 15–40 km
  - SS-60: 20–60 km
  - SS-80: 22–90 km
  - SS-80G: 22–90 km
  - SS-150: 29–150 km
  - MANSUP: 70–200 km
  - AV-TM 300: 30–300 km
  - FOG MPM: 5–60 km
- Armour: classified. Probably light composite to give protection against small-arms fire.
- Armament: one battery of 2, 4, 16 or 32 rocket-launcher tubes
- Performance:
  - fording 1.1 m
  - vertical obstacle 1 m
  - trench 2.29 m
- Ammunition Type: High explosive (HE) with multiple warhead

== Operators ==
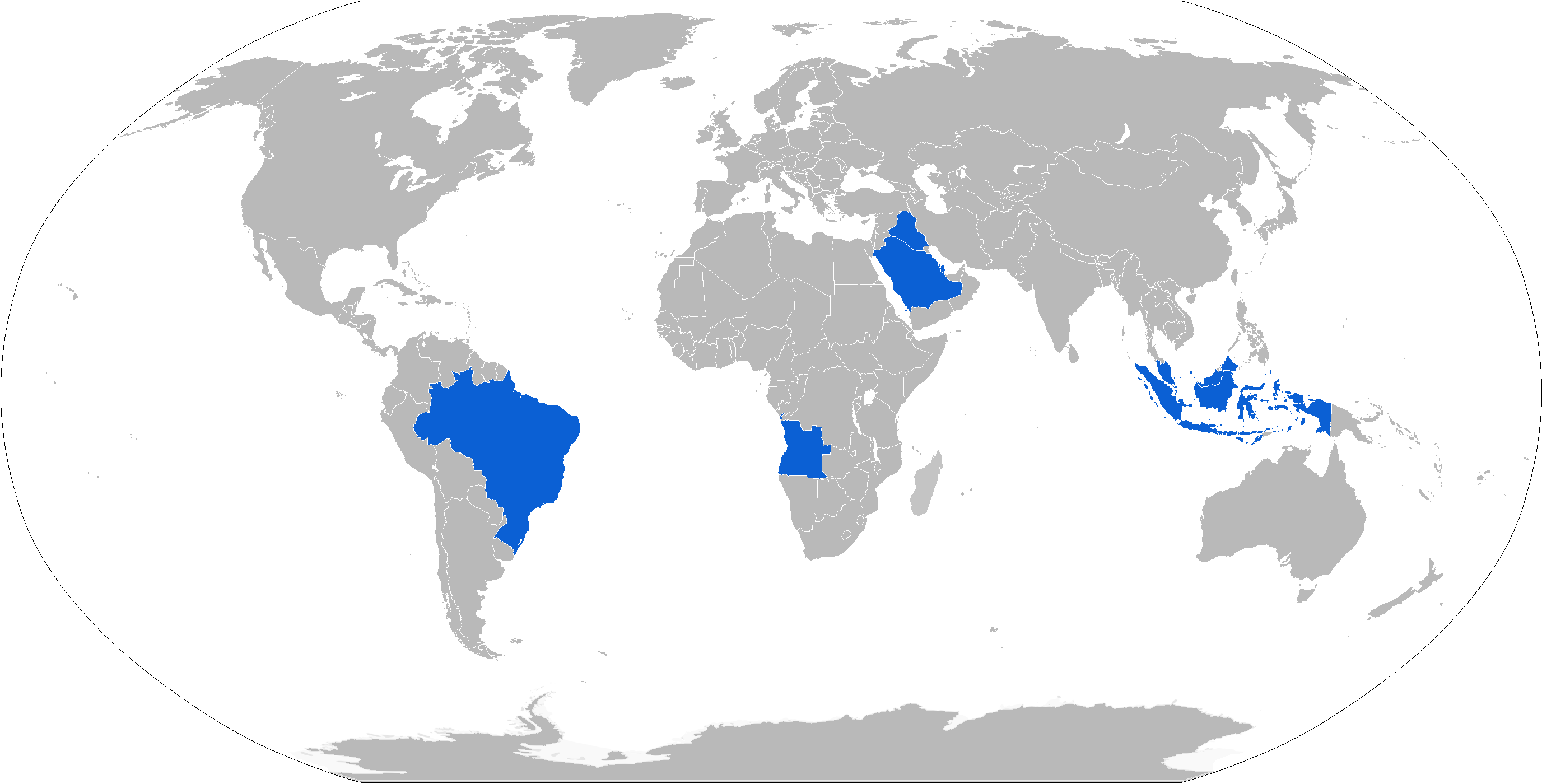
Map with Astros II operators in blue

- Angola: Likely 20 Astros II, with 6000 SS-40 and SS-60 rockets.
- Brazil
  - Brazilian Army: 20 Astros II Mk3M, 18 Astros II Mk6.
  - Brazilian Marine Corps: 6 Astros II Mk6.
- (Indonesia) Indonesian Army: 63 Astros II Mk6 (first batch of 36 ordered in 2012 and second batch of 27 delivered in 2020).
- Iraq: 66 Astros II. (also built under license as the Sajil-60). Only with rockets of shorter range SS-40 and SS-60.
- (Malaysia) Malaysian Army: 36 units of Astros II.
- Qatar
- Saudi Arabia: 60 Astros II.

=== Potential operators ===
- Spain: Spain is currently evaluating K239 Chunmoo, Astros II and PULS systems, but the decision regarding a potential order of one of these systems has not been made.
- Ukraine: On December 4, 2022, the Brazilian media reported a Ukrainian interest in the ASTROS system, to equip the Army in the Russo-Ukrainian War efforts. The sale was blocked by the Bolsonaro administration. A diplomatic effort by the United States to persuade the president-elect of Brazil, Luiz Inácio Lula da Silva, to unblock the deal was reported on the 5th of December 2022.

== See also ==
- Tayfun (missile) – (Turkey)
- Roketsan Multi-Barrel Rocket Launcher [MBRL]
- HIMARS – (United States)
- BM-21 Grad – (Soviet Union)
- RM-70 – (Czechoslovakia)
- T-122 Sakarya – (Turkey)
- 9A52-4 Tornado – (Russia)
- Fajr-5 – (Iran)
- TOROS – (Turkey)
- Falaq-2 – (Iran)
- Pinaka multi-barrel rocket launcher – (India)
