= Avibrás AV-VB4 RE Guará =

AV-VB4 RE
- AV-VB4 RE (Guará)
- Type: Infantry Mobility Vehicle
- Place of origin: Brazil

Production history
- Designed: 2003
- Manufacturer: Avibrás
- Produced: Manufactured in Brasil - tested in Haiti

Specifications
- Mass: 7.65 tonnes
- Length: 5.5 m
- Width: 2.3 m
- Height: 2.2 m
- Crew: 4-6
- Armor: Level 1
- Main armament: Top mounted FN MAG
- Secondary armament: Unknown
- Engine: Mercedes Benz OM 904 LA 4 turbo diesel 177 hp
- Power/weight: -
- Suspension: wheeled 4×4
- Operational range: 600 km
- Maximum speed: 97 km/h

The AV-VB4 RE 4×4 GUARÁ is an armoured personnel carrier manufactured and developed by the Brazilian company Avibrás and tested in Haiti. It holds a crew of four and six passengers, and weighs 7.65 tonnes. GUARÁ was developed from the chassis of the German off-road vehicle UNIMOG 4000, whose platform met some important requirements, such as the ability of high-speed roads (97 km/h) and to go over various terrains, to be transported by rotary and fixed-wing aircraft, maintaining a radius of 600 km, easy maintenance and good logistic dependence, low ground pressure, great tactical mobility and the option to be equipped with additional armor, a spacious interior and yet to have a relatively light weight of 7650 kg in standard configuration. Several versions were planned, of which the most significant were: Command Post, anti-tank equipped with missiles and radar, forward reconnaissance, mortar carrier, Ambulance, UNO etc..

== History ==
On April 16, 2002, the IPD (Institute for Research and Development Army) introduced the Brazilian designed prototype of the newest Light Armored Reconnaissance 4x4 Car, designated AV-VB4 RE and christened GUARÁ—a species of wolf inhabiting different regions of Brazil. Its official presentation took place from 22 to 25 April 2003 in the LAD, held in Rio de Janeiro, where it was possible to appreciate this vehicle on static display.

The project aims to introduce a new family of wheeled armored vehicles for the Brazilian Army, intended for future selection processes in 4×4, 6×6, or 8×8 configurations. Developed through a joint venture between a private company and a public research body at no cost to the government, the project demonstrates the capacity of local industry and research centers to produce viable domestic defense technologies.

At first glance the car impressed with its size, although there were smaller vehicles in the world and largest in this category, making it the youngest brother of other armored vehicles developed by Avibrás such as VBL, already exported to the Malaysian Army and in full serial production.

== Description ==
The prototype presented featured welded mono-bloc body armour steel plates imported from the United States, designed to withstand fire from rotary MAG 7.62 mm machine guns and 12.7 mm (.50) calibre bullets.

Its engine is a Mercedes Benz OM 904 LA 4 177 hp turbo diesel. It is also equipped with 24 Volts DC electrical system, disc brakes on all four wheels with ABS/ALB, hydraulic power steering and electronically controlled transmission. The suspension is progressive coil springs with shock absorbers, stabilizer bars and chassis frame of flexible, high torsional flexibility, 11:00-20SDC wheels and 335/80R20 radial tires, ready for any terrain.

Have as standard equipment: air conditioning system, thermal and acoustic insulation, heating and defogging; renewal system with air filtration, security lock starter; autopilot; toroid for driving with flat tire, gun hatch, antenna installation, directional lamp for reading maps; loophole / viewers, adjustable seats with three-point retractable seat belts, tool kit with flashlight, first-aid kit, hydraulic jack, two 20 liter canisters, rope winch, auxiliary air outlet, a fire extinguisher with external triggering; inclinometer; smoke grenade launcher, storage for machine gun ammunition and manuals.

As optional equipment may have: winch with a capacity of 7000 kg; smoke grenade launcher system, monitoring system control and tire pressure, additional shielding, additional anti-mine protection, internal anti-chipping lining; armored swiveling turret gun, driven electrically or mechanically, automatic fire detection and extinguishing; additional shielding for the windscreen, controlled from inside the cabin; CBN protection system, CBN contamination detection system, power mirrors, seats with integrated four-point safety belts, laser light detectors and infra-red night vision periscope for the shooter, driver and commander, laser range finder and targeting system, radio transmitter, intercom system, search light, camouflage transparent armor, parking brake on all four wheels, auxiliary power system, additional hatches, telescope mast for antennas with cameras (h = 7.6 m) GPS navigation system, steppe with crane, automatic transmission and low pressure tires.

== Status ==
The vehicle was in testing at the Proving Ground Marambaia in Rio de Janeiro, being evaluated by the Army Technology Center. The next step was the operational evaluation by the Center for reviews of the Army. The Guará was developed through a partnership between the IPD/SCT (Institute for Research and Development/Department of Science and Technology) and Avibrás, a survivor of the "golden period" of the production of military vehicles "Made in Brazil" between the 70s and early 90s. It was supposed to fill a gap that now exists in the Army in terms of armored 4x4 vehicles, and also to be exported to various countries, as had happened with other vehicles Avibrás series—e.g., to Malaysia.
