= AV-TM 300 =

Brazilian cruise missile

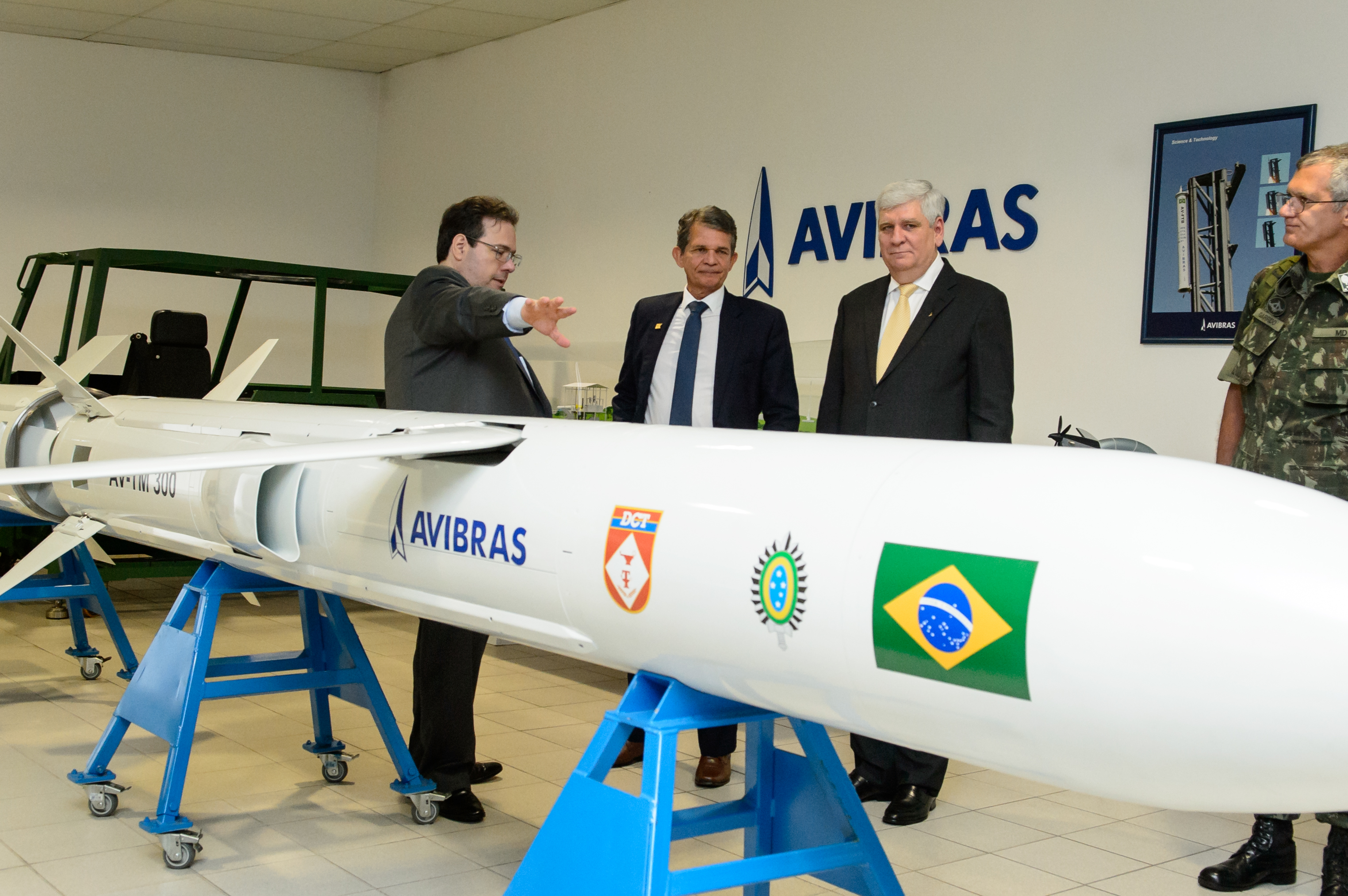
- Type: Cruise missile
- Place of origin: Brazil

Production history
- Manufacturer: Avibras
- Produced: Officially in development since 2001

Specifications
- Mass: 1140 kg
- Length: 5400 mm
- Diameter: 450 mm [9]
- Wingspan: 1250 mm
- Warhead: 200-500 kg
- Engine: Turbomachine TJ1000 Turbojet; 1,000 lbf
- Propellant: 1st stage: solid propellant 2nd stage: turbojet (0.85 Mach)
- Operational range: 30-300 km (Depending on the engine power, the Missile can reach more than 500 or 1,000 km)
- Maximum speed: 0.85 Mach
- Guidance system: GPS / INS
- Accuracy: less than 30 meters
- Launch platform: Astros II; JAS 39 Gripen (pending)

The AV-TM 300 Tactical Missile or MTC-300 (Míssil Tático de Cruzeiro) is a Brazilian cruise missile developed by Avibras for the Astros II system. Nicknamed Matador ("killer"), it is projected to be a less expensive alternative to the American BGM-109 Tomahawk. The missile is equipped with a central computer that combines a ring laser gyroscope, connected to an active GPS navigation device that uninterruptedly supplies positioning information for course correction. Apparently there also will be a naval version called X-300. The missile can use a single warhead of 200 to 500 kg high explosive or cluster munition warhead with 64 submunitions for anti-personnel or anti-tank targets.

== Development ==
The first version of the missile was created in 1999, however, the development of the missile officially started in September 2001. Eventually, the original specifications underwent a major modification, including removal of the retractable wings and addition of composite materials. The missile uses solid-fuel rockets for launching, and a turbojet during the subsonic cruise flight. The missile uses a variant of the Turbomachine TJ1000, an indigenous turbojet engine developed by Turbomachine company and used by Avibras under a manufacturing license agreement.

The Brazilian Army signed the development contract and invested R$ 100 million since 2012, the development stages are being finalized by 2021 and already have about two dozen launches from test fields such as the CLBI. The force has commissioned an initial batch of 100 units. In addition to being used in the land force, the weaponry can be used by the ASTROS of the Brazilian Marine Corps. As of December 2023, the missile was still in the test phase and had yet to enter service. By April 2024, Avibras faced debt and labor issues and owed approximately R$ 60 million worth of undelivered orders to the Brazilian Army. General Rocha Lima, head of the Army Projects Office, described the AV-TM as the company's greatest unconcluded project. On August 2026, Avibras and the Brazilian Army advanced in the certification fase of the program, with a new test launch of the missile.

== Air launched variant ==
The MICLA-BR (acronym in Portuguese for Brazilian Long-Range Cruise Missile) development was confirmed by the Brazilian Air Force in September 2019 to equip the JAS 39 Gripen with the first tests of the missile conducted in the same year with a Brazilian F-5 EM as a test platform. The Brazilian Air Force intends to declare the MICLA-BR fully operational in the early 2030s.

== Operators ==
Brazil

- Brazilian Army – used in the ASTROS system
- Brazilian Marine Corps – used in the ASTROS system
- Brazilian Air Force – under development for the JAS 39 Gripen

== See also ==
- 3M-51 Alfa – (Russia)
- Atmaca – (Turkey)
- Babur – (Pakistan)
- BGM-109 Tomahawk – (United States)
- BrahMos – (India, Russia)
- Hyunmoo-3 – (South Korea)
- Khalij Fars – (Iran)
- 3M-54 Kalibr – (Russia)
- Noor ASCM – (Iran)
- P-800 Oniks – (Russia)
- Qader – (Iran)
- Ra'ad (air-launched cruise missile) – (Pakistan)
- RK-55 – (Soviet Union)
- SOM – (Turkey)
- YJ-18 – (China)
- Zafar – (Iran)
