= Nexter Titus =

Titus
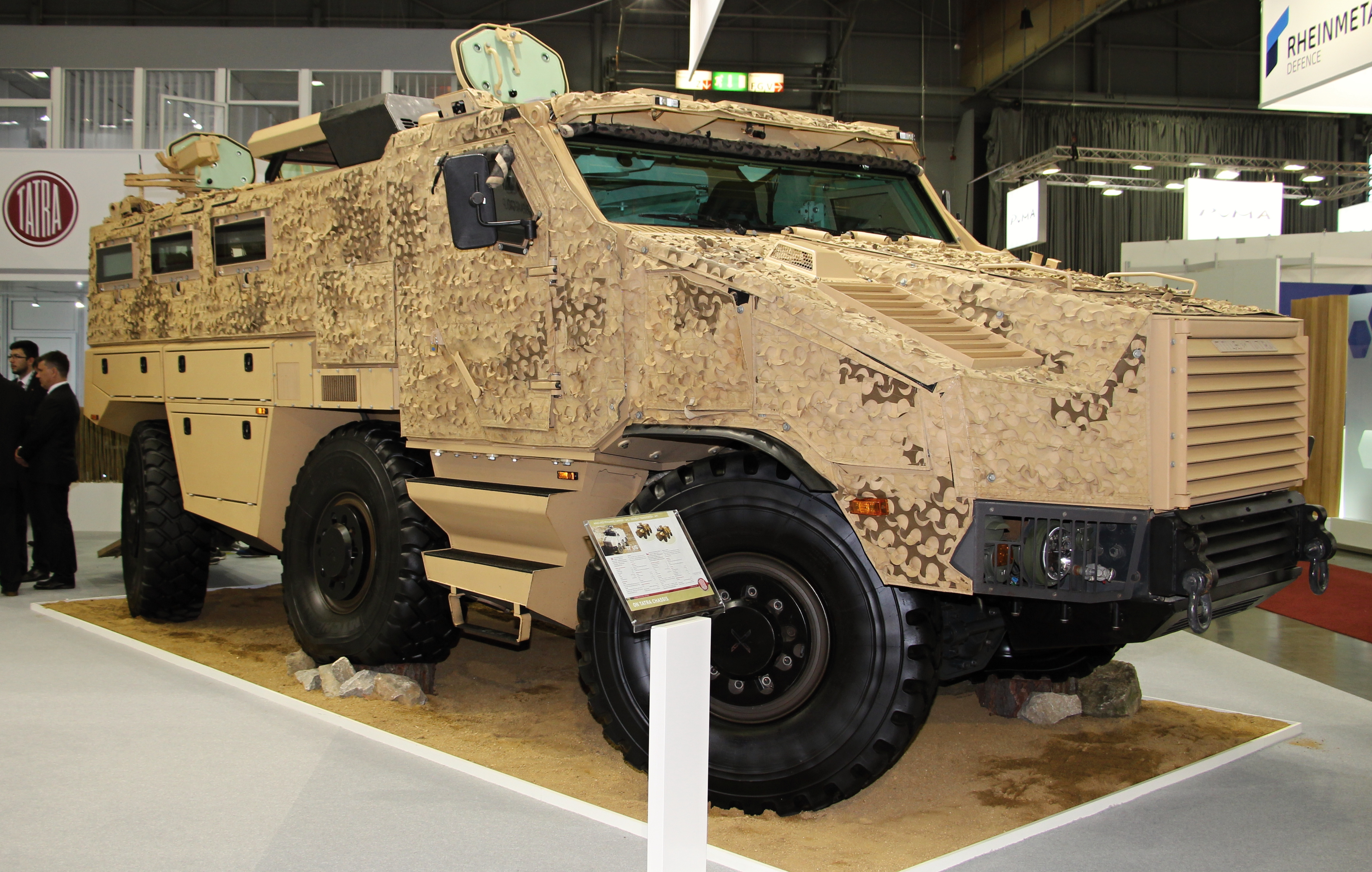
- The Titus on display at the IDET 2017 convention
- Type: Infantry Mobility Vehicle
- Place of origin: France/Czech Republic

Service history
- Used by: See Operators

Production history
- Manufacturer: Nexter and Tatra Defence Vehicle
- Produced: 2013-present

Specifications
- Mass: 17 t (19 short tons)
- Crew: 3+10
- Main armament: Remote weapon station (varies by customer/requirement)
- Engine: Cummins; 400 hp (300 kW)
- Operational range: 700 km (430 mi)
- Maximum speed: 110 km/h (68 mph)

The Titus is an infantry mobility vehicle developed and built by Nexter and Tatra Defence Vehicle.

== Design ==
The Titus platform uses the Tatra 817 chassis. The Nexter Titus is a six-wheeled vehicle capable of 700 km of range and sustaining a crew of 3 with 10 additional soldiers on-board. Its maximum speed is up to 110 km/h and it boasts the level 4 STANAG ballistic protection level.

== Operators ==
- (Albania) Albanian Land Force : 16 vehicles are currently trialed and to enter service soon.
- (Czech Republic) Czech Army : 62 vehicles ordered in 2019, in three versions (36 communications vehicles, 6 command and staff vehicles, and 20 fire support coordination vehicles).
- (Saudi Arabia) Royal Saudi Land Forces : Unknown number of Nexter Titus, used as 105mm howitzer tractor.
- United Arab Emirates Armed Forces : Excalibur Army has signed a contract worth 47 million euros with Resource Industries from the United Arab Emirates (UAE), which it announced at the IDEX 2023 trade fair. The contract means the production and supply of more than two hundred vehicles with Tatra chassis for military and civilian purposes for the UAE market. The contract, after taking into account the costs of the partner in the UAE, can reach a value of up to 77 million euros. These are Tatra Force trucks, Patriot II MRAPs, TREVA-30 ARVs and Tatra Titus MRAVs.
