= Tatra Phoenix =

Tatra 158 Phoenix
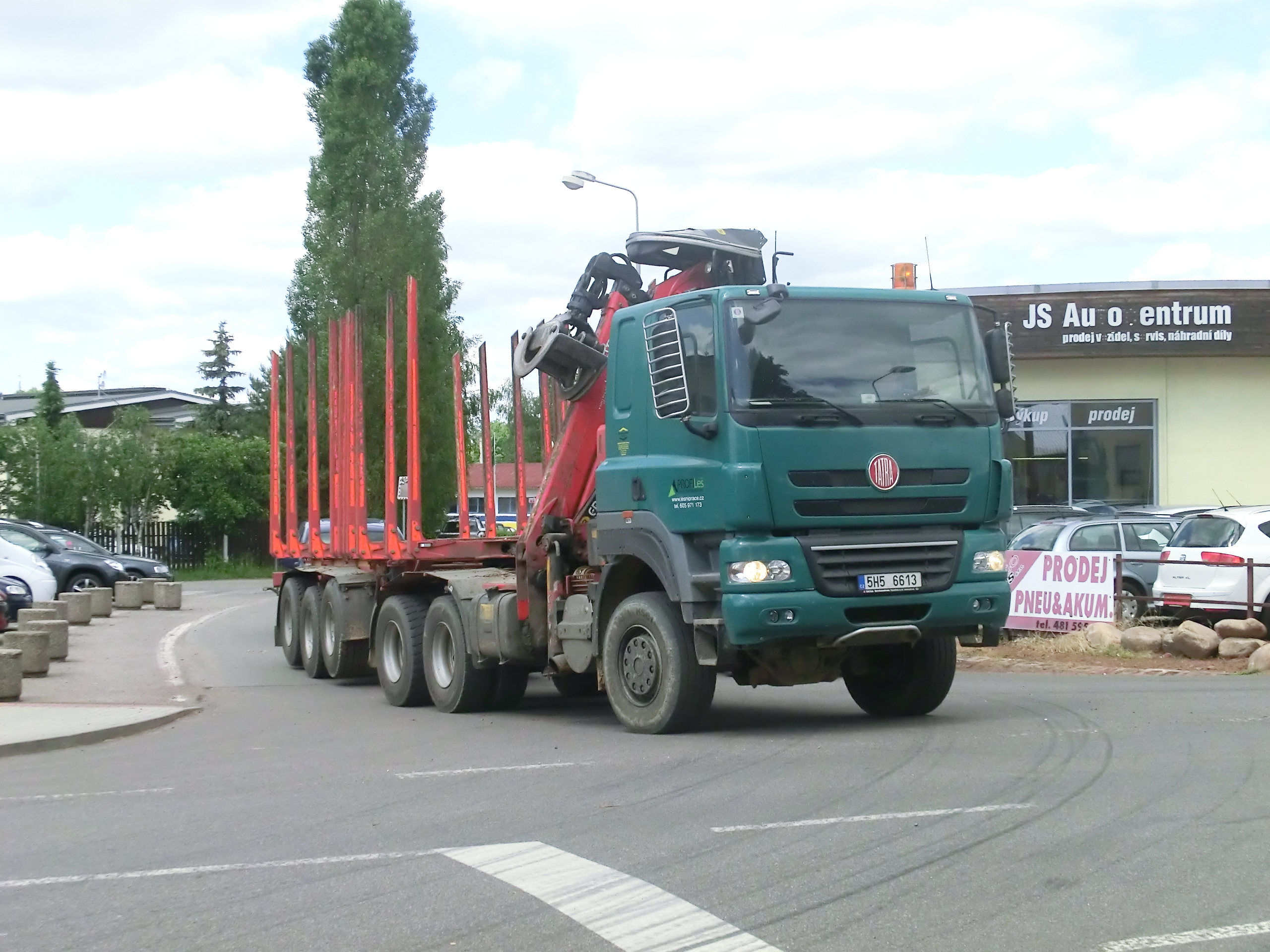

Overview
- Manufacturer: Tatra
- Production: 2011-present
- Assembly: Czech Republic

Body and chassis
- Class: Heavy truck
- Related: Tatra 817 Force; DAF CF

Powertrain
- Engine: Liquid cooled Diesel Paccar MX 11/13, up to 375 kW (503 hp)

Dimensions
- Wheelbase: 1,450 mm (57.1 in); 1,950 mm (76.8 in); 2,860 mm (112.6 in)
- Length: 6,690 mm (263.4 in)
- Width: 2,550 mm (100.4 in)
- Height: 3,240 mm (127.6 in)
- Curb weight: 8,700 kg (19,200 lb)

Chronology
- Predecessor: Tatra 815

The Tatra 158 Phoenix is a heavy truck made by the Czech company Tatra, produced since 2011, with axle variations of 4×4, 6×6, 8×6, 8×8 and 10×10, but it can even be made 14×12 or 16×16 for a custom order. The truck was developed in cooperation with the DAF Trucks company.

Phoenix is Tatra's main general purpose vehicle intended for civilian customers, while model T817 is intended primarily for military users.

== Description ==
For the Tatra 158 Phoenix model line, Tatra does not use air-cooled engines of its own design, but uses Paccar MX engines, according to the emissions standards of Euro III, Euro V, and since 2015 with Euro VI.

Standard is the 16-speed gearbox ZF, manual or automatic. The auxiliary transmission is of Tatra's own construction. The vehicle is built on the Tatra-concept chassis. Angle of approach is at 31°, this is one of the best values of the approach angle among off-road all-wheel drive trucks.

The Tatra Phoenix won second place in the European Truck of the Year 2012 competition. At Silva Regina 2012 exhibit in Brno has been awarded by the “Extraordinary Award of the CEO and Jury".

The first Tatra Phoenix Euro VI vehicles appeared in operation in early 2015. They have new facelifted cabins designed by DAF (again in Day or Sleeper Cab versions) and a completely reconstructed cabin floor.

The new generation of Tatra Phoenix come in june 2024, with the new series DAF CF cabs.

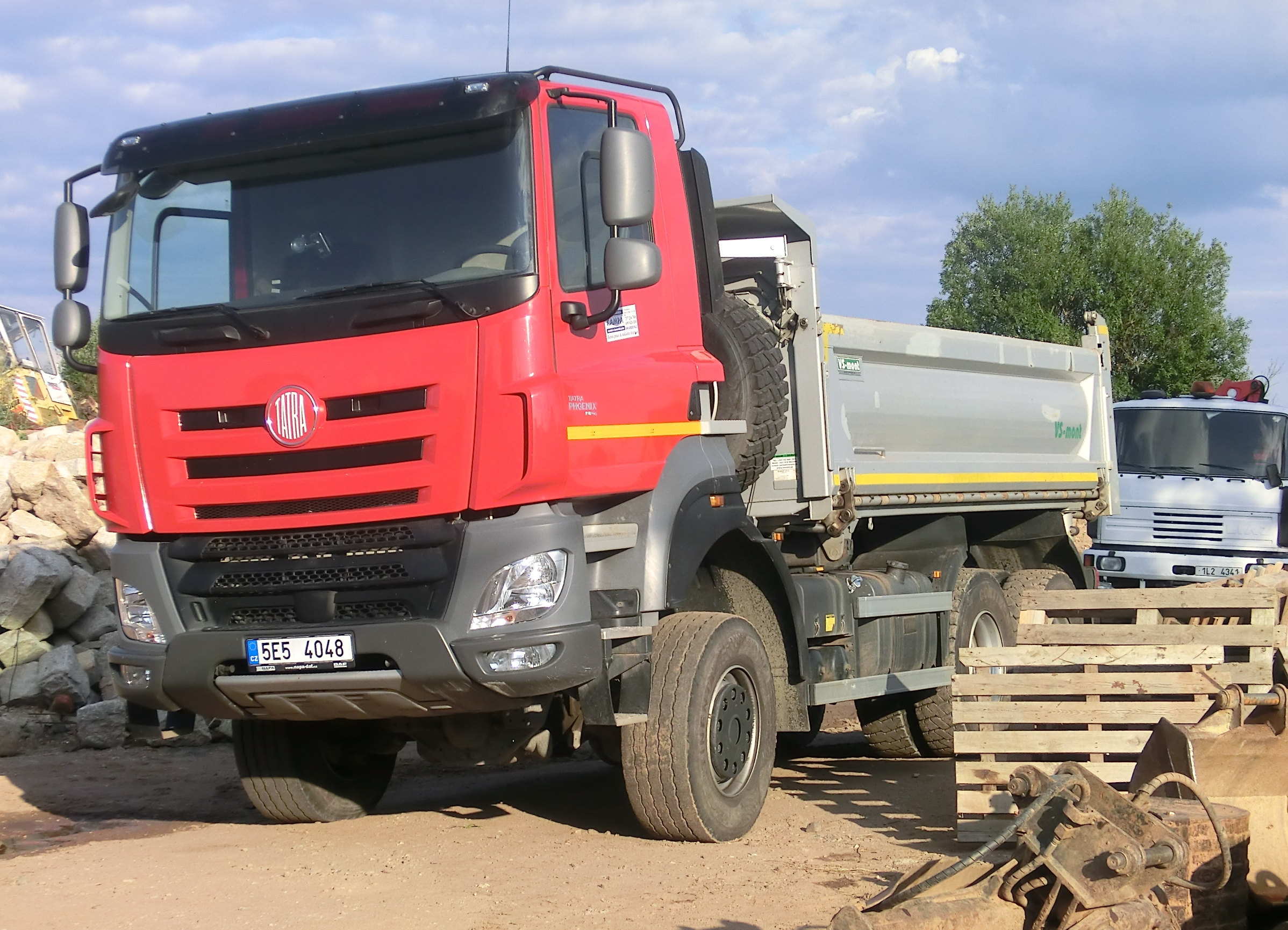
Tatra Phoenix Euro VI, with facelifted cabin

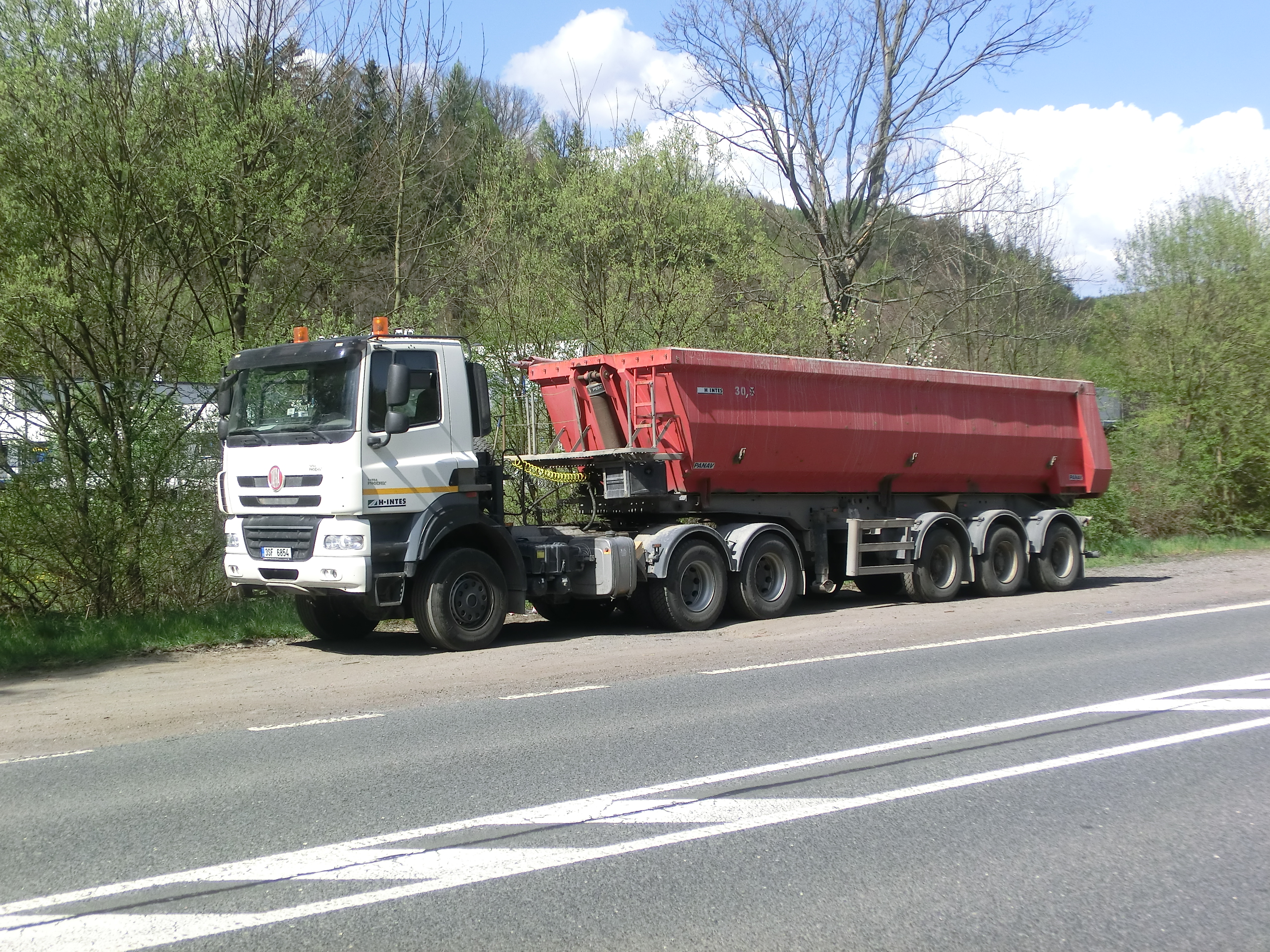
Tatra Phoenix prime mover

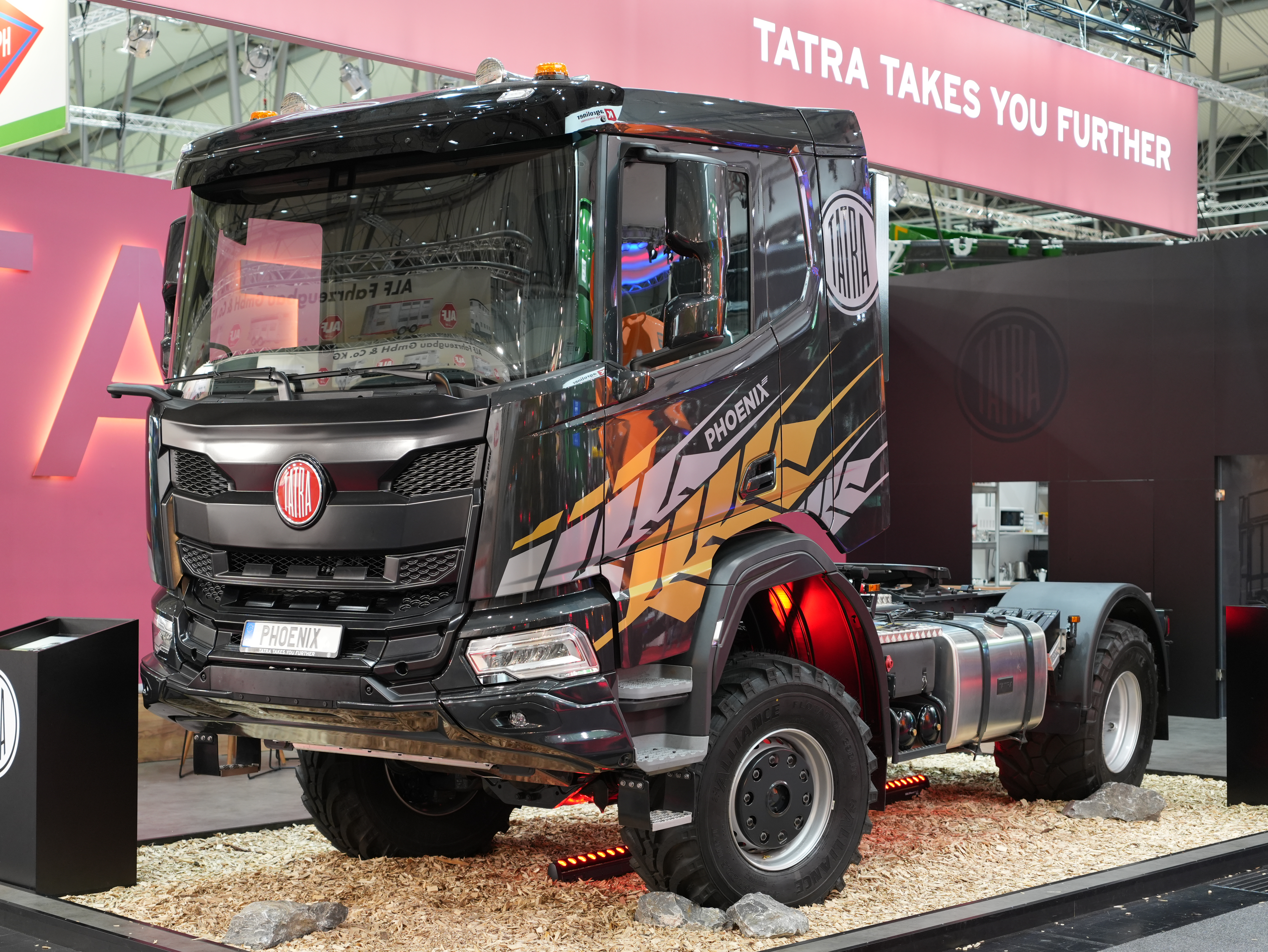
Tatra Phoenix since 2024

== Specifications ==
- motors: turbocharged Paccar MX 11 or MX 13
- displacement: 10.8 or 12.9 L
- max. power : 375 kW (503 hp) @ 1750 rpm
- max. torque : 2,500 N⋅m (1,800 ft⋅lbf) @ 1425 rpm
- top speed: 85 km/h
- fuel tank capacity: 345 l
- angle of approach: 31°
