= SAM120 =

- Type: Self-propelled mortar
- Place of origin: Slovakia

Service history
- Used by: Azerbaijan

Production history
- Manufacturer: ZŤS Špeciál
- Produced: 2026-present
- No. built: 0/96

Specifications
- Crew: 2 (driver and gunner/commander)
- Caliber: 120 mm
- Elevation: From +40° to +80°
- Traverse: 360°
- Rate of fire: 20 rounds per minute
- Effective firing range: 504 - 8200 meters
- Maximum speed: 90 km/h

SAM120 (short for Slovak Automatic Mortar with a caliber of 120 mm) is a self-propelled mortar developed by ZŤS Špeciál, from the Czechoslovak self propelled mortar Vz.85 ShM-120 PRAM-S.

The SAM120 is designed to destroy enemy firepower, light equipment and personnel that are hidden in trenches or light field shelters.

== Unveiling and Development ==
ZŤS Špeciál began the development of vehicle in 2021. An initial prototype, named AM120, based on a Tatra 815-7 6×6 chassis with a Puma armoured cabin, was presented in May 2024 at IDEB in Bratislava. The initial prototype that was presented could carry up to 60 rounds.

The next prototype, presented at IDET 2025 in Brno, featured a reworked loading system and could only carry 35 rounds, but this allowed the mortar to be mounted on an even wider variety of platforms including a 4×4 chassis. It was renamed to SAM120 as well.

== Design ==
The mortar can be installed on a wide variety of platforms which is one of the advantages of this vehicle. Immediately after firing, the vehicle can move quickly and avoid return fire thanks to its high top speed of 90 km/h. Another advantage of the mortar is its very high rate of fire of up to 20 rounds per minute.

The mortar's elevation range is from +40° to +80°, with a horizontal traverse of 360° (fully rotatable turret). Its minimum range is 504 meters and the maximum range with standard 120 mm mortar ammunition is 8,200 meters and thanks to a high degree of automation, the crew only consists of two, a driver and a gunner or a commander, though at the request of the customer, the crew can consist of up to four.

The vehicle was designed in such a way that firing is conducted primarily remotely from the armoured cabin, which is separate from the mortar's automated turret. If necessary, firing can also be conducted directly from the turret, which is equipped with a fully-featured manual control system. The Lansys AM120 fire-control system is manufactured by the Slovak company Kerametal.

== Operators ==
=== Future operators ===
Azerbaijan (96 on order)
In February 2026, the Slovak Minster of Defence, Robert Kaliňák, approved a framework agreement with Azerbaijan for around 300 SAM120 mortars. The first part of this agreement consists of an order for 96 mortars. The agreement was signed at the World Defense Show in Riyadh, Saudi Arabia. It's important to note that Azerbaijan ordered only the turrets, which will then be installed on a local chassis.

=== Potential operators ===
Czech Republic
In July 2026, the Slovak Minster of Defence together with the Czech Minister of Defence Jaromír Zůna agreed to cooperate on the purchase of the SAM120. In late July 2026, Zůna with his Czech delegation visited the Military technical and testing institute Záhorie, where the Slovak defence industry presented not only the SAM120, but also drones, UGVs, and the EVA M2 in live firing exercises and tests. According to Zůna, the Czech Armed Forces still need mortar systems as a part of the modernization and the development of their light and heavy brigades. The Czech Republic could join the framework agreement that the Slovak Ministry of Defence signed with ZŤS Špeciál in December 2025 and if they would it is estimated that they could order up to 50 mortars.

Slovakia
In December 2025, the Slovak Ministry of Defence signed a framework agreement with ZŤS Špeciál for the SAM120. The number of mortars ordered is unknown, but is rumored that Slovakia is obtaining 24.
