= Avibras Falcão =

Falcão

General information
- Type: Unmanned aerial vehicle
- National origin: Brazil
- Manufacturer: Avibras

The Avibras Falcão is a Brazilian unmanned aerial vehicle (UAV) designed for reconnaissance missions, target acquisition, support for firing direction, damage assessment, and land and maritime surveillance. Its design is the result of the work of several engineers, technicians and designers led by Eng. Alessandro L. Branco, Technical Manager to UAV and Aeronautical Systems at Avibras. The Falcão has an endurance of over 16 hours and a payload capability of 150 kg (330 lb), and it is configured to carry an electro-optical sensor and a radar with range of 1,500 kilometres (930 mi).
