= Avibras =

Brazilian defense industry company

Avibras Aeroco
- Type: Private company
- Industry: Defense
- Founded: 1961; 65 years ago
- Headquarters: Jacareí, São José dos Campos, Brazil
- Area served: Latin American
- Key people: Sami Hassuani (President and CEO)
- Products: Anti-aircraft; Artillery; Missiles; Armoured vehicles; Electronics; Explosives
- Number of employees: 800 (March 2024), 420 layoff
- Parent: Globe Investimentos
- Website: www.avibras.com.br/site/en

Avibras Aeroco, previously Avibras Indústria Aeroespacial S.A., is a Brazilian aerospace and defense company. Its range of products encompasses artillery and aircraft defense systems, rockets and missiles such as air-to-ground and surface-to-surface weapon systems, including artillery rocket systems; 70 mm air-to-ground systems and fiber optic multi-purpose guided missiles. It makes armoured vehicles as well. It also manufactures civilian transportation through a division called Tectran, telecommunications equipment, electronic industrial equipment (Powertronics), automotive painting and explosives.

Brothers Joesley and Wesley Batista, through Globe Investimentos, the company owned by the brothers who own JBS, bought 100% of manufacturer of weapons and equipment. Globe is a personal investment company through which they invested in Usiminas.

== History ==
In April 2024, DefendTex, an Australian company, had proposed acquiring the company, which has a debt of more than R$600 million or around €80 million, of which R$14.5 million is owed to workers. In June 2024, the Australian Government decided not to support DefendTex financially in the acquisition of Avibras. Norinco is also interested in Avibras, with 49% stake, if DefendTex could not raise US$70 millions from Australian Government Credit to its acquisition and transfer advanced missile manufacturing capability from Brazil to Australia. Avibras is supposed to be valued at US$200 million, laid off 420 employee, a third of its workforce in 2022, those who remained were not paid for more than a year. Its debt is estimated at R$570 million (US$104.5 million) in 2022 and had ballooned to R$700 million (US$128.480 million) in 2024. Federal Deputy Guilherme Boulos presented on July 18, 2024, in the Chamber of Deputies a proposal Federal Government to expropriate the industry with R$2 billion, to own brazilian government continue development of ongoing and new projects.

Avibras Indústria Aeroespacial S/A, located in Jacareí, might faced bankruptcy if it fails to settle outstanding tax payments. The request was made by the National Treasury Attorney General's Office to the Court on Wednesday 26 march 2025, after the company failed to comply with installments of a debt refinancing with the Union. The request was forwarded to the 2nd Civil Court of Jacareí, where Avibras' judicial recovery process is underway. The attorney for the National Treasury, Guilherme Chagas Monteiro, requested that the company be summoned to regularize its situation, under penalty of the judicial recovery being converted into bankruptcy. The company's current debt to the Federal Government is around R$200 million, which was already renegotiated in a previous agreement. The Metalworkers Union of São José dos Campos and Region (SindiMetal SJC) maintains its demand for the nationalization of Avibras, highlighting the strategic importance of the company for national sovereignty, in addition to its debts with the Union. The president of the Union, Weller Gonçalves, believes that the federal government should take control of the company, instead of filing for bankruptcy, arguing that the debts with public agencies such as BNDES and Finep would justify the nationalization. Since March 2022, Avibras has been in judicial recovery and currently has a 23-month salary debt with its approximately 900 workers, who have been on strike since September 2022. The company is responsible for manufacturing a large part of the missiles and rockets used by the Brazilian armed forces, including the 70mm missiles used by Super Tucano and Esquilo aircraft. In addition to its debts to the Federal Government, the company is facing even more serious financial problems. In an injunction issued on Monday (24), the Court ordered the freezing of Avibras shares, currently controlled by Rocket Bridge NewCo Holding Participações S/A. The measure was taken after a request from the Brasil Crédito investment fund, a creditor of the company. The decision also prevents Avibras from carrying out any corporate transaction that would change the status of its shares. Saudi investor Black Storm Military Industries, which has been negotiating with Avibras since January, will be ordered to make any payments related to the transaction. It is estimated that Avibras currently has around R$1.5 billion in debt.

On 31 January 2025 the company announced that it is in advanced discussions with Black Storm Military Industries of the Kingdom of Saudi Arabia (KSA) to facilitate a potential investment aimed at the financial recovery of Avibras. The terms and conditions of the investment are being finalised, according to Avibras. Talks between the Brazilian defence and aerospace conglomerate Grupo Akaer, the Abu Dhabi Investment Group (ADIG) of the United Arab Emirates (UAE), the Brazilian private investment bank Brasilinvest Banco de Negócios, and the US private capital investment firm GF Capital are currently taking place for the potential acquisition of 100% of Avibras.

== Main products ==
In production

- Astros II: A multiple rocket launcher and important product of Avibras, used in six countries. The Astros II was decisive in stopping the Iranian offensive during the Iran–Iraq War (1980–1988) and was used by Saudi Arabia against Iraqi forces during Operation Desert Storm (1991).
- AV VBL 4×4 : Is a Brazilian armoured personnel carrier, used by Malaysian Army.
- Guará 4×4: Is another Brazilian armoured personnel carrier.
- AV-SS 12/36, a light multiple rocket launcher. It can fire rockets with weight up to 6 kg, and range up to 12 km.
- Astros Hawk, the ASTROS HAWK is designed to support light forces through the use of high mobility launcher-vehicles and a variety of ammunition. The ammunition is compatible with the ASTROS II System. The system can place a high volume of fire in a very short period of time, at ranges up to 12 km.
- Skyfire, based on its extensive experience with the SBAT 70 (Air-to-Ground Brazilian System) Avibras developed and started to produce and export to its clients the most advanced 70 mm rocket system, the SKYFIRE, a high performance air-to-ground rocket system for employment in any type of combat aircraft or helicopter.
- EDT-FILA, state-of-the-art anti-aircraft defense fire control equipment, to detect aircraft and missiles at low altitude, directing the fire of anti-aircraft guns and missiles.
- VANT Falcão a single-engine, MALE Unmanned Aerial Vehicle low-wing composite material and structure.

Under development

- MANSUP: The developing jointly with the Mectron to the Navy of Brazil. Is an anti-ship missile with a range of about 75 km. developed from repowering project missiles MBDA MM40 Exocet Block III from Brazilian Navy with technology transferred by the MBDA.
- AV-TM 300: a GPS and/or laser-guided cruise missile, its range is up to 300 km.
- AV-SS-150: a GPS guided missile, its range is up to 150 km.
- SS-AV-40: a GPS guided missile, its range is up to 40 km. There is no support from the Brazilian government for this project.
- FOG-MPM in testing stage, the new generation FOG-MPM (Fiber Optics Guided Multi Purpose Missile), uses fiber optics to permit the operator, without a line of sight to the enemy, to guide the missile to the acquisition and destruction of the target. The use of fiber optics for guidance also makes the missile immune to enemy ECM (Electronic Counter Measures). With the present range of up to 60 kilometers, and a possibility to be further extended to over 100 kilometers, the FOG-MPM may also to be employed as an additional ammunition for the ASTROS II System. Today its employment is against tanks, helicopters and fortifications.
- A-Darter a fifth generation short range infrared homing ("heat seeking") air-to-air missile

== Gallery ==
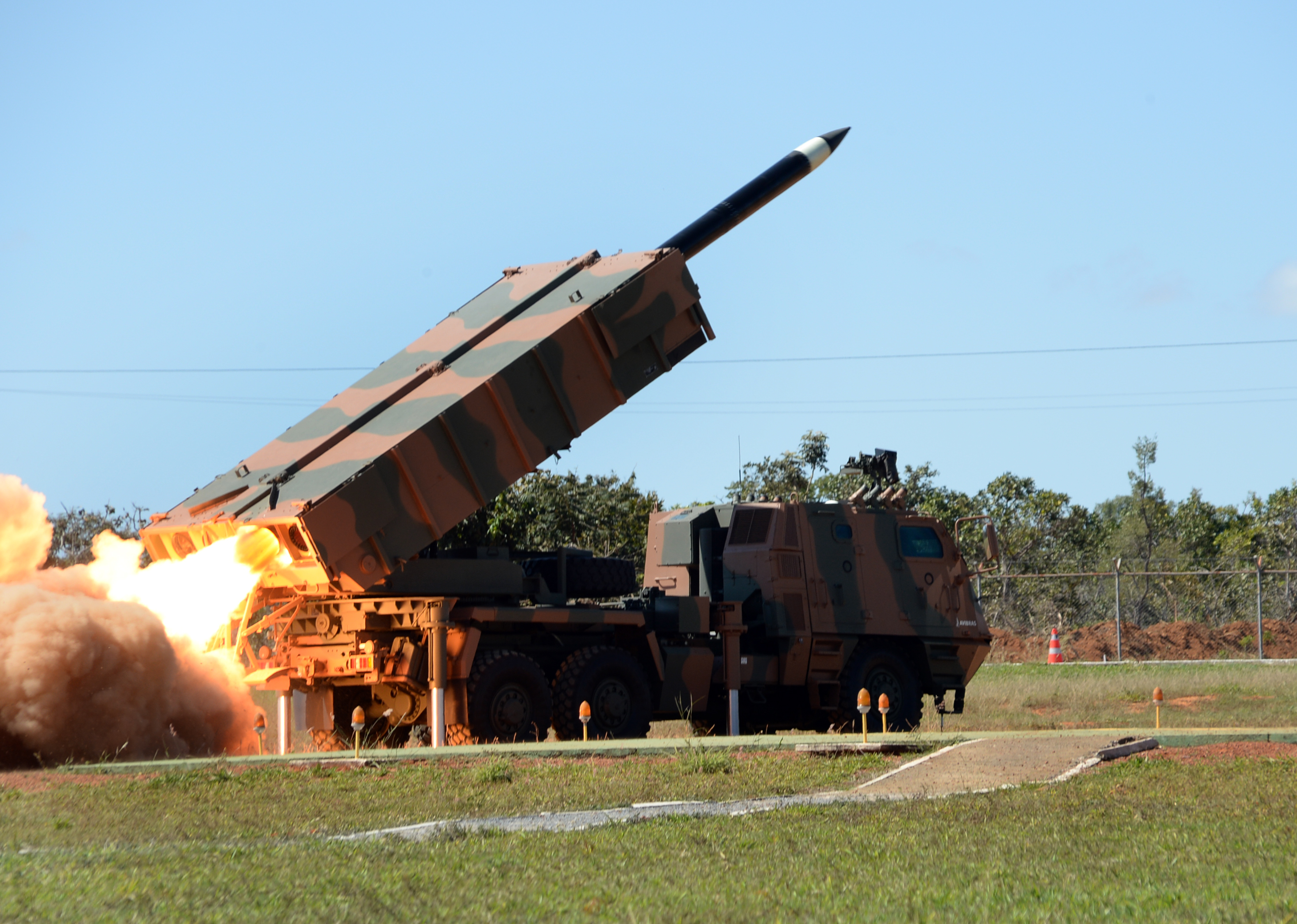
Artillery saturation rocket system, Astros II MK6

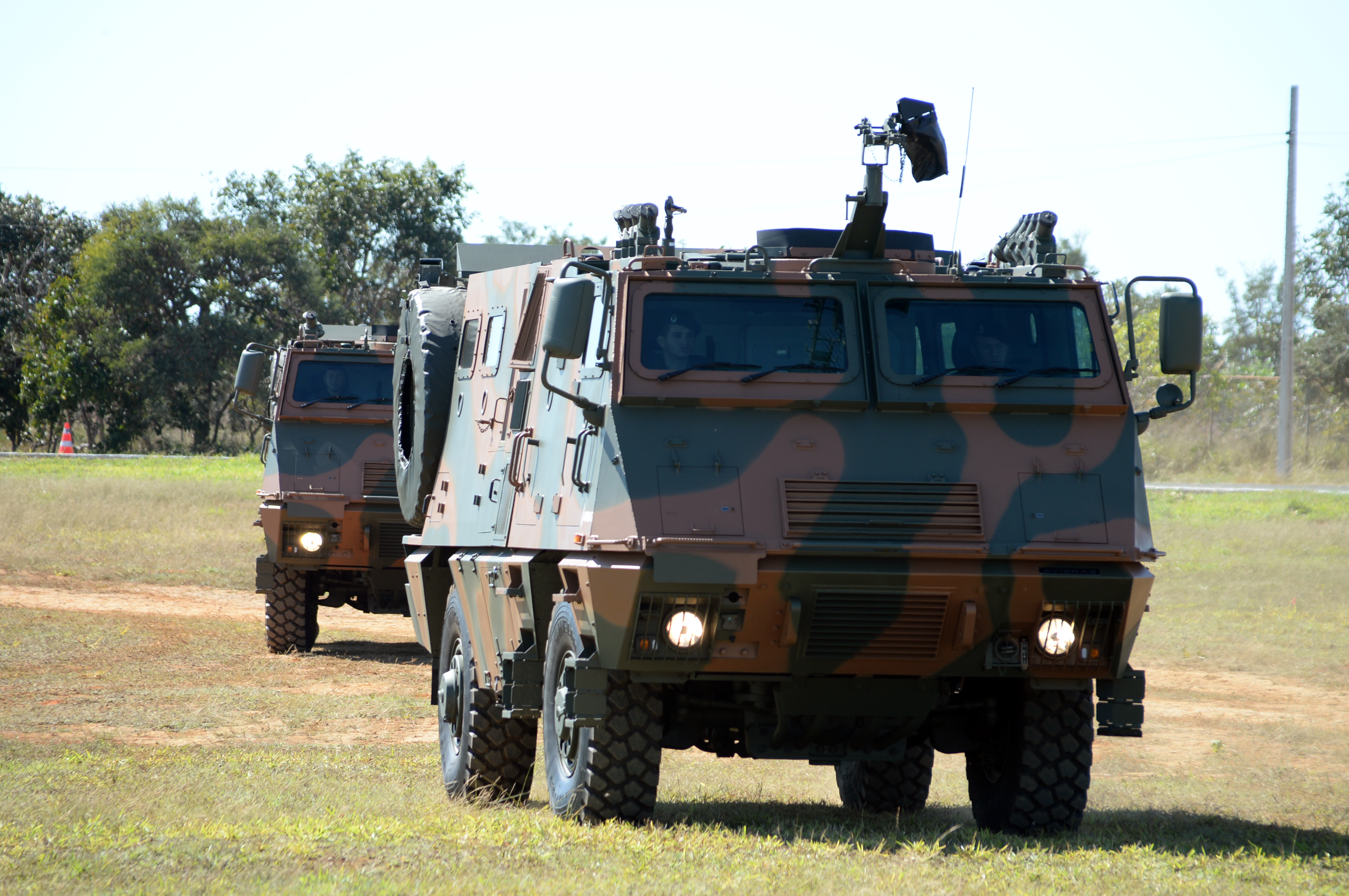
Armoured personnel carrier AV VBL 4×4

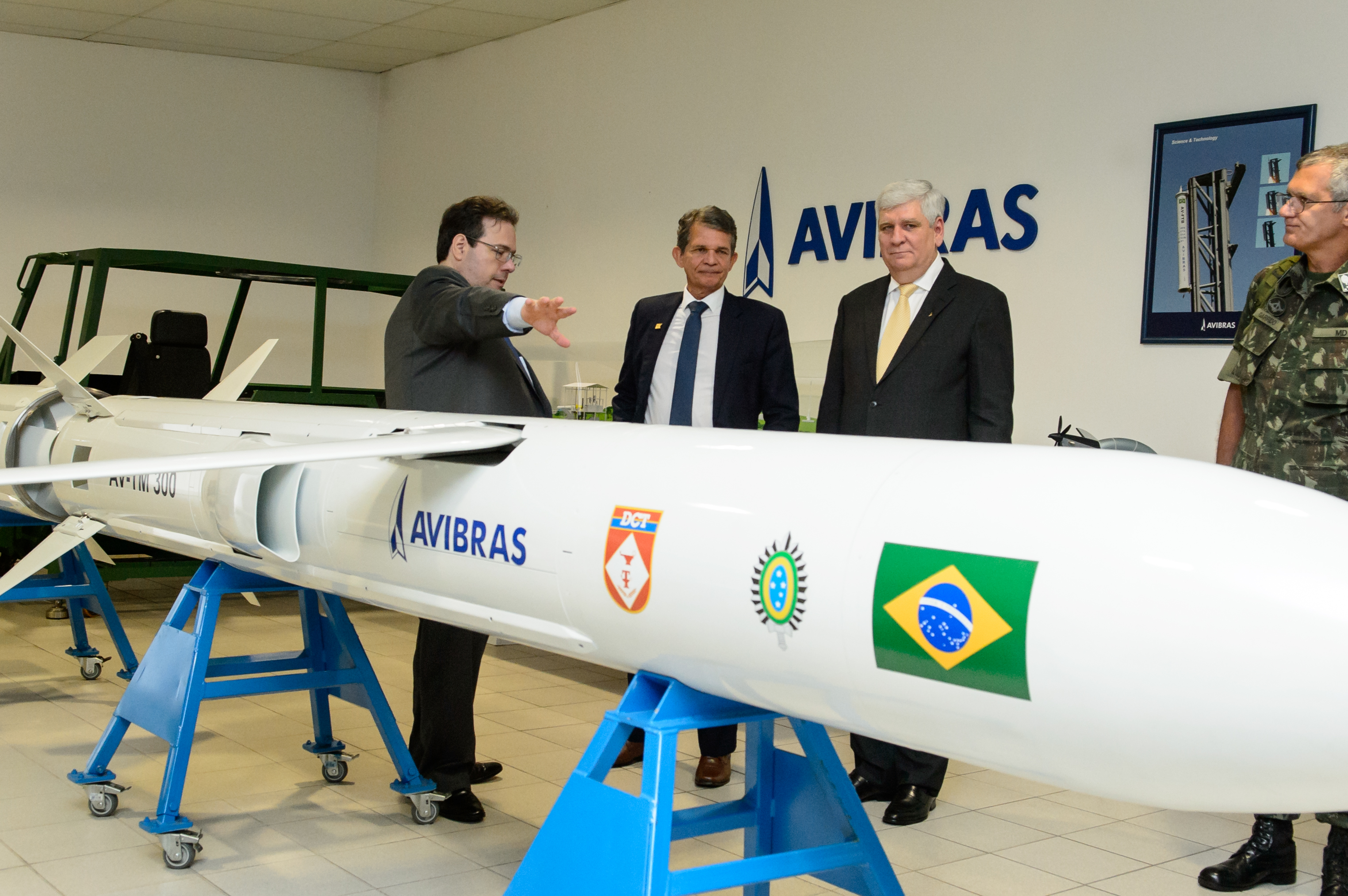
AV-TM 300

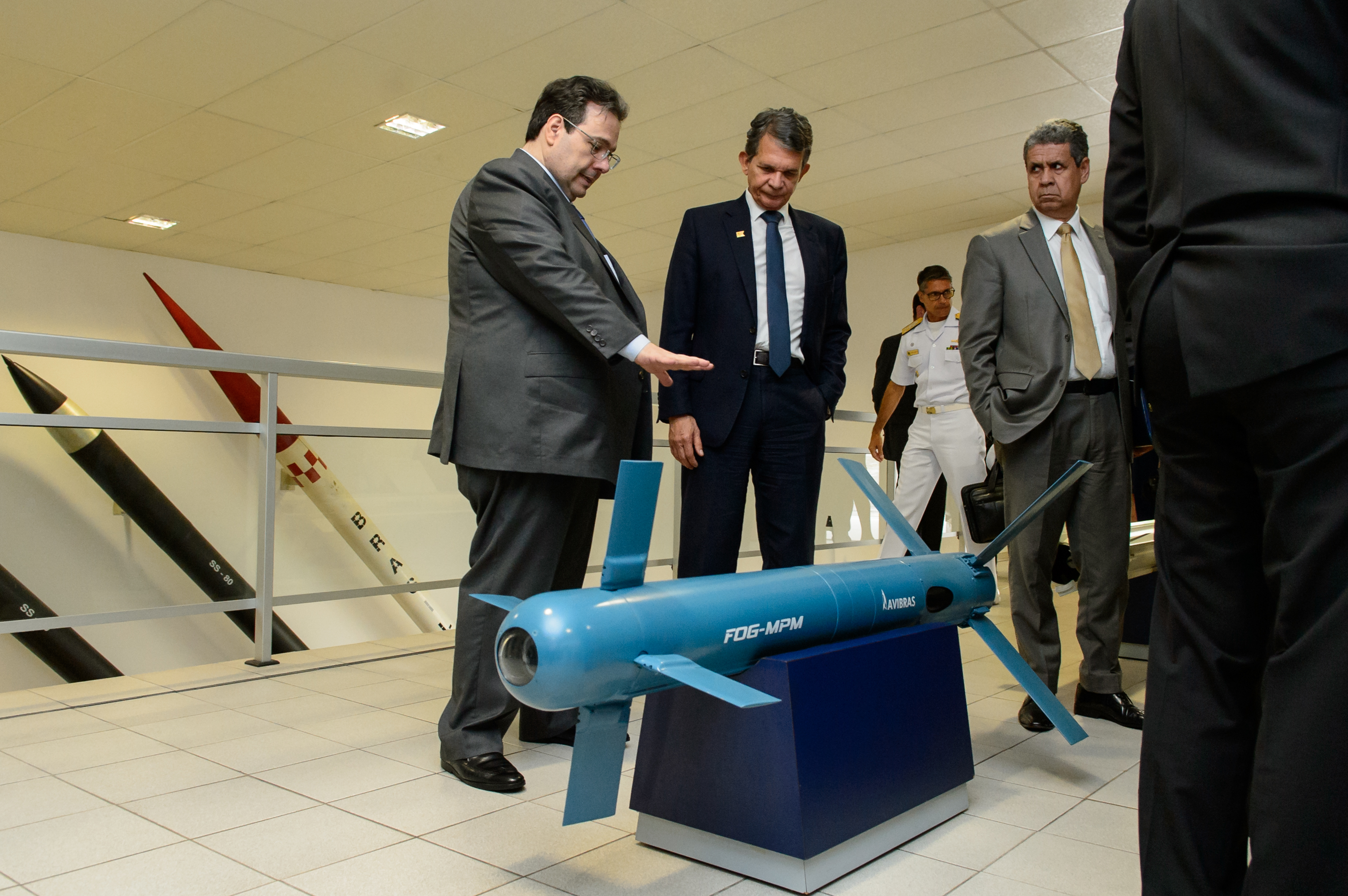
FOG-MPM

== See also ==
- Defense industry of Brazil
- Iron Dome
