= 152 mm SpGH DANA =

Czechoslovak self-propelled howitzer

Vz. 77 DANA
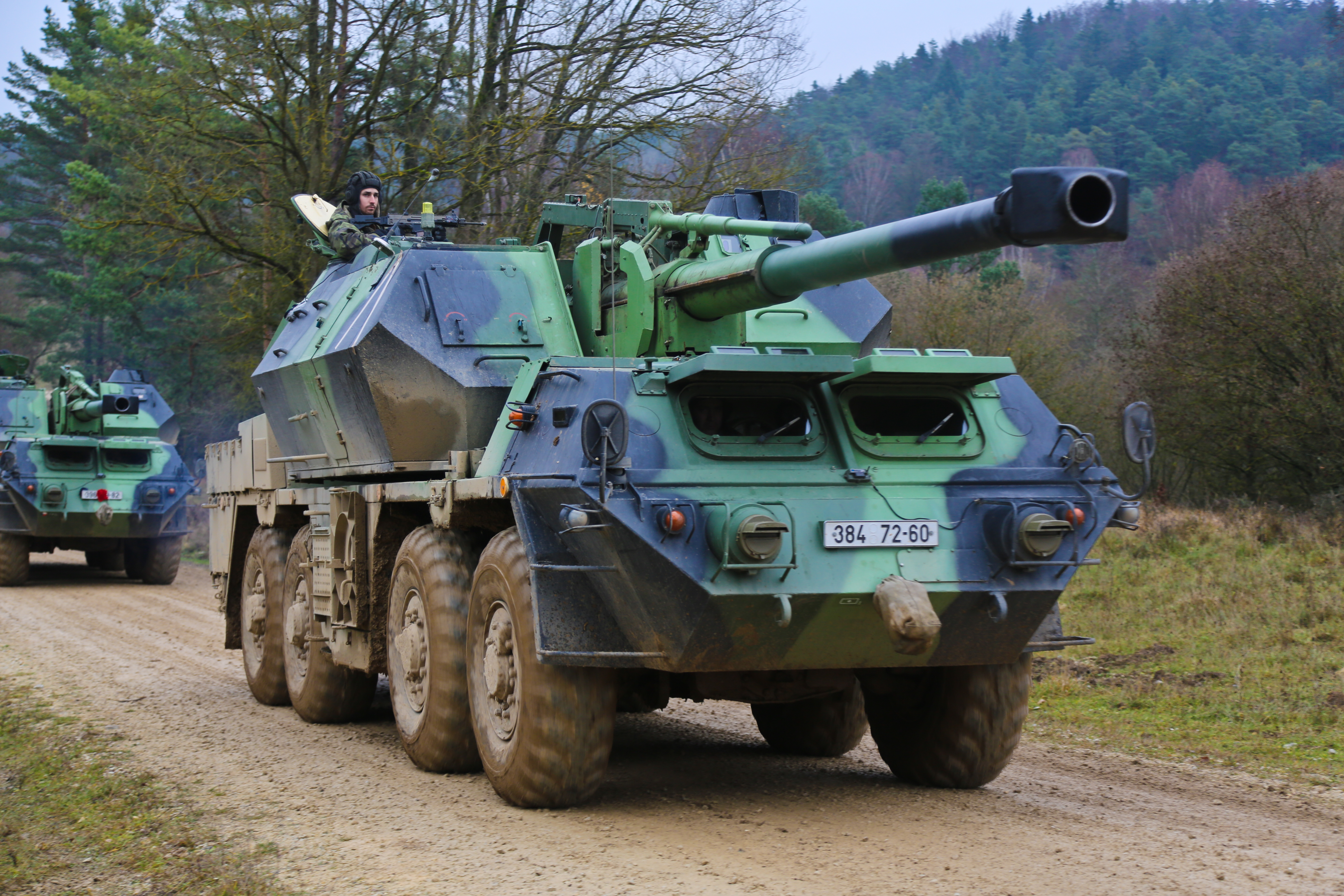
- ShKH vz. 77 of Czech Army during a military exercise, 21 November 2013.
- Type: Self-propelled gun
- Place of origin: Czechoslovak Socialist Republic

Service history
- In service: 1981–present
- Wars: Chadian–Libyan Conflict; War in Afghanistan; Russo-Georgian War; Libyan Civil War; 2020 Nagorno-Karabakh conflict; Russo-Ukrainian War

Production history
- Designer: Konštrukta Trenčín
- Designed: 1976
- Manufacturer: ZTS Dubnica nad Váhom (SK); Excalibur Army (CZ)
- Produced: 1980–present
- No. built: 750+

Specifications
- Mass: 29.25 t (32.24 short tons)
- Length: 11.156 m (36 ft 7.2 in)
- Width: 3 m (9 ft 10 in)
- Height: 3.63 m (11 ft 11 in) (with AAMG)
- Crew: 5
- Shell: HE, HEAT
- Shell weight: 43.5 kg (96 lb) (HE); 27.4 kg (60 lb) (HEAT)
- Caliber: 152.4 mm (6 in)
- Barrels: 5,580 mm (18 ft 4 in)
- Breech: Semi-automatic, vertical sliding-wedge
- Elevation: -4° to +70°
- Traverse: ±220°
- Rate of fire: 4 rpm (semi-automatic); 2 rpm (manual)
- Muzzle velocity: 693 m/s (2,274 ft/s) (HE)
- Effective firing range: 18.7 km (11.6 mi)
- Maximum firing range: 20 km (12 mi)
- Sights: ZZ-73 with PG1-M-D collimator (indirect fire); OP5-38-D (direct fire)
- Main armament: 152 mm howitzer (approx. 36.6 calibre) (60 rounds)
- Secondary armament: 12.7 mm DShK (2,000 rounds)
- Engine: Tatra T2-930-34; 253.7 kW (340.2 hp)
- Ground clearance: 0.41 m (1 ft 4 in)
- Operational range: 600 km (370 mi)
- Maximum speed: 80 km/h (50 mph)

The DANA (Dělo automobilní nabíjené automaticky - gun on truck loaded automatically) is a wheeled self-propelled artillery piece. It is also known as the Samohybná Kanónová Húfnica vzor 77 (ShKH vz. 77; self-propelled gun howitzer model 77). It was designed by Konštrukta Trenčín and built by ZTS Dubnica nad Váhom in the former Czechoslovakia (now Slovakia). Introduced in the 1979, it was the first wheeled 152 mm self-propelled artillery gun to enter service. It is based on a modified eight-wheel drive (8×8) Tatra 815 chassis with excellent cross-country mobility.

Compared to tracked vehicles, wheeled vehicles have the advantages of being cheaper to build and easier to maintain with greater strategic mobility. Tyre pressure can be regulated via a central tire inflation system to allow good mobility off-road and there is power-assisted steering on the front four wheels. Three hydraulic stabilisers are lowered into the ground before firing the main gun, and a roof-mounted crane is available to assist with ammunition loading.

The crew of the DANA consists of a driver (who operates the hydraulic stabilisers), the commander sitting in the front cabin, the gunner (aims the gun and opens fire) and loader operator (selects the appropriate amount of powder charges) are on the left side of the turret, the ammo handler (sets the shells' primers) is on the right side of the turret.

The original DANA had manual fire control and an autoloader. The latest version, MORANA, has computerised automatic fire control, allowing reduction of crew to three.

== Development ==
The DANA was designed in the late 1970s by Konštrukta Trenčín to provide the Czechoslovak People's Army with an indigenous self-propelled indirect fire support weapon without having to resort to purchasing the Soviet 2S3 Akatsiya. Design work was completed in 1976 and the DANA project was handed off to production at ZTS Dubnica nad Váhom. It was accepted into service in 1981, and by 1994 over 750 units had been built.

The DANA was also exported to Poland, Libya, and Georgia.

== Design ==
The DANA was a significant departure from contemporary self-propelled guns such as the tracked Soviet 2S1 Gvozdika and 2S3 Akatsiya or its Western-made counterpart, the M109 howitzer, as it used a wheeled chassis and featured an innovative automated loading system which was the first of its kind at the time of its introduction to service. The vehicle has a driving cabin at the front, an open-topped fighting compartment at mid-length and the engine compartment in the rear. The front crew cabin seats both the driver/mechanic and vehicle commander. The armoured turret is installed on a traversable mount adapted to the Tatra 815 wheeled chassis (8×8) and is divided into two halves, divided by the howitzer's recoil mechanism and a pathway for the reciprocating action during firing. The left half of the turret is occupied by the gunner and first loader and houses the various fire control optics, electro-mechanical gun laying controls, the automatic propellant charge feeding device, and an auxiliary ammunition magazine. The right side of the turret contains a mechanised projectile delivery system which is operated by a second loader at this position.

The DANA's primary weapon is a 152 mm howitzer with a monolithic barrel (with a fixed rifling pitch) equipped with one expansion chamber. The howitzer has a semi-automatic, vertically-sliding-wedge-type breech which opens to the left side. The recoil assembly consists of a hydraulic buffer, two pneumatic return cylinders and a controlling plunger which governs the displacement of the buffering system. The gun laying is carried out by an electro-hydraulic drive system or an emergency manual control.

DANA's unique feature is that its autoloader is able to load a shell and a cartridge in any elevation of the barrel.

As there is no gyroscopic or similar system for independent, automated and autonomous gun laying in the DANA, the gunner of howitzer uses a ZZ-73 panoramic telescope with a PG1-M-D collimator for indirect gun laying. This sight has a horizontal scale used to set the appropriate horizontal laying via aiming at reference points. This means that the DANA is not an autonomous system there needs to be an additional device to assist in gun laying (in fact, the firing positions of such artillery systems are usually prepared before the guns are positioned there). For direct fire engagements, the gunner uses an OP5-38-D telescopic sight.

== Ammunition ==
As of 2014, there are three main shell types used by Czech Army:

1. 152-EOF, which means "high-explosive" with a maximum range of 18 kilometres (11 mi)
2. 152-EOFd, which means "high-explosive long-range" with a maximum range of 20 kilometres (12 mi)
3. 152-EPrSv, which means "high-explosive anti-tank" used for direct-fire at armored targets

== General characteristics ==
- Length: 10.5 m (34 ft)
- Width: 2.8 m (9 ft)
- Height: 2.6 m (8.53 ft)
- Weight: 23,000 kg (50,706 lb)
- Performance:
  - Maximum Road Speed: 80 km/h (50 mph)
  - Range: 600 km (373 mi)
  - Rate of Fire: 3 rpm for 30 minutes
  - Maximum Gun Range: 28 km (17 mi)
  - Fording: 1.4 m (4.59 ft)
  - Vertical Obstacle: 1.5 m (5 ft)
  - Trench: 1.4 m (4.59 ft)
- Crew: 4 to 5
- Armament:
  - Primary: 152 mm gun-howitzer, length: 5,580 mm (37 calibers)
  - Secondary: 12.7 mm DShK
- Elevation: -4° to +70°
- Traverse: ±45°
- Powerplant: one V12 air-cooled diesel Tatra T2-939-34 engine delivering 345 horsepower (257.27 kW)

== Variants ==
Variant	Image	Year	Crew	Calibre	Maximum range	Rate of fire	Chassis	Users	Notes
Czechoslovak variants
DANA		1979	5	152.4 mm (6 in) 37 calibers	18.7 km (11.6 mi); 25.5 km (15.8 mi) (DN1CZ shells)	5 rounds per minute 2 rounds per minute in manual mode 36 rounds carried in autoloader, up to 60 in total	Tatra 815 8×8; V12 engine Tatra T2-930-34 253.7 kW (340.2 hp)	Czech Republic; Georgia; Poland; Ukraine Former operators: Czechoslovakia; Slovakia; Great Socialist People's Libyan Arab Jamahiriya; Soviet Union	
ONDAVA		Late 1980s	4	152.4 mm (6 in) 47 calibers	32 km (20 mi)	6 rounds per minute 2 rounds per minute in manual mode 36 rounds carried in autoloader, 40 in total	Tatra 815 8×8; V12 engine Tatra T3-930-52 265 kW (355 hp)	Prototype only.	
Slovak development
MODAN		1999	4	152.4 mm (6 in) 42 calibers	20 km (12 mi)	5 rounds per minute 2 rounds per minute in manual mode 36 rounds carried in autoloader, 60 in total	Tatra 815 8×8; V12 engine Tatra T3-930-52 265 kW (355 hp)	Former: Slovakia	
vz. 2000 Zuzana		1998	4	155 mm (6 in) 45 calibers	39 km (24 mi)	5 rounds per minute 2 rounds per minute in manual mode 36 rounds carried in autoloader, 40 in total	Tatra 815 8×8; V12 engine Tatra T3-930-52 265 kW (355 hp)	Slovakia; Cyprus	
A40 Himalaya			4	155 mm (6 in) 45 calibers	39 km (24 mi)	5 rounds per minute 2 rounds per minute in manual mode 36 rounds carried in autoloader, 40 in total	T-72 tank chassis V-46 engine 573 kW (768 hp)	Prototype only	
Zuzana 2		2019	4	155 mm (6 in) 52,9 calibers	41 km (25 mi); 51.5 km (32.0 mi) (VLAP shells)	5 rounds per minute 2 rounds per minute in manual mode 40 rounds carried	Tatra 817 8×8; V8 engine Tatra T3D-928-70 325 kW (436 hp)	Slovakia; Ukraine	
Czech development
DANA M1		2011	5	152.4 mm (6 in) 37 calibers	18.7 km (11.6 mi); 25.5 km (15.8 mi) (DN1CZ shells)	5 rounds per minute 2 rounds per minute in manual mode 36 rounds carried in autoloader, up to 60 in total	Tatra 815 8×8; V12 engine Tatra T3-930-52M 265 kW (355 hp)	Azerbaijan	
DANA M2		2018	2 minimum (+1)	152.4 mm (6 in) 37 calibers	18.7 km (11.6 mi); 25.5 km (15.8 mi) (DN1CZ shells)	5 rounds per minute 2 rounds per minute in manual mode 36 rounds carried in autoloader, up to 60 in total	Tatra 815 8×8; V12 engine Tatra T3-930-52M 265 kW (355 hp)	Poland; Ukraine	
DITA		2021	2 minimum (+1)	155 mm (6 in) 45 calibers	39 km (24 mi) (HE BB shell)	6 rounds per minute (including Multiple round simultaneous impact) 40 rounds carried in autoloader	Tatra 817 8×8; V8 engine Tatra T3D-928-90 300 kW (400 hp)	Ukraine; Azerbaijan	
MORANA		2022	3	155 mm (6 in) 52 calibers	Indirect fire: 41.5 km (25.8 mi) (HE BB shell) Direct fire: 5 km (3.1 mi)	6 rounds per minute (including Multiple round simultaneous impact) 45 rounds carried in autoloader	Tatra 817 wide-body 8×8; I6 engine Cummins ISX 447 kW (599 hp); STANAG Level 2 Armor protection	Latvia	

== Combat history ==
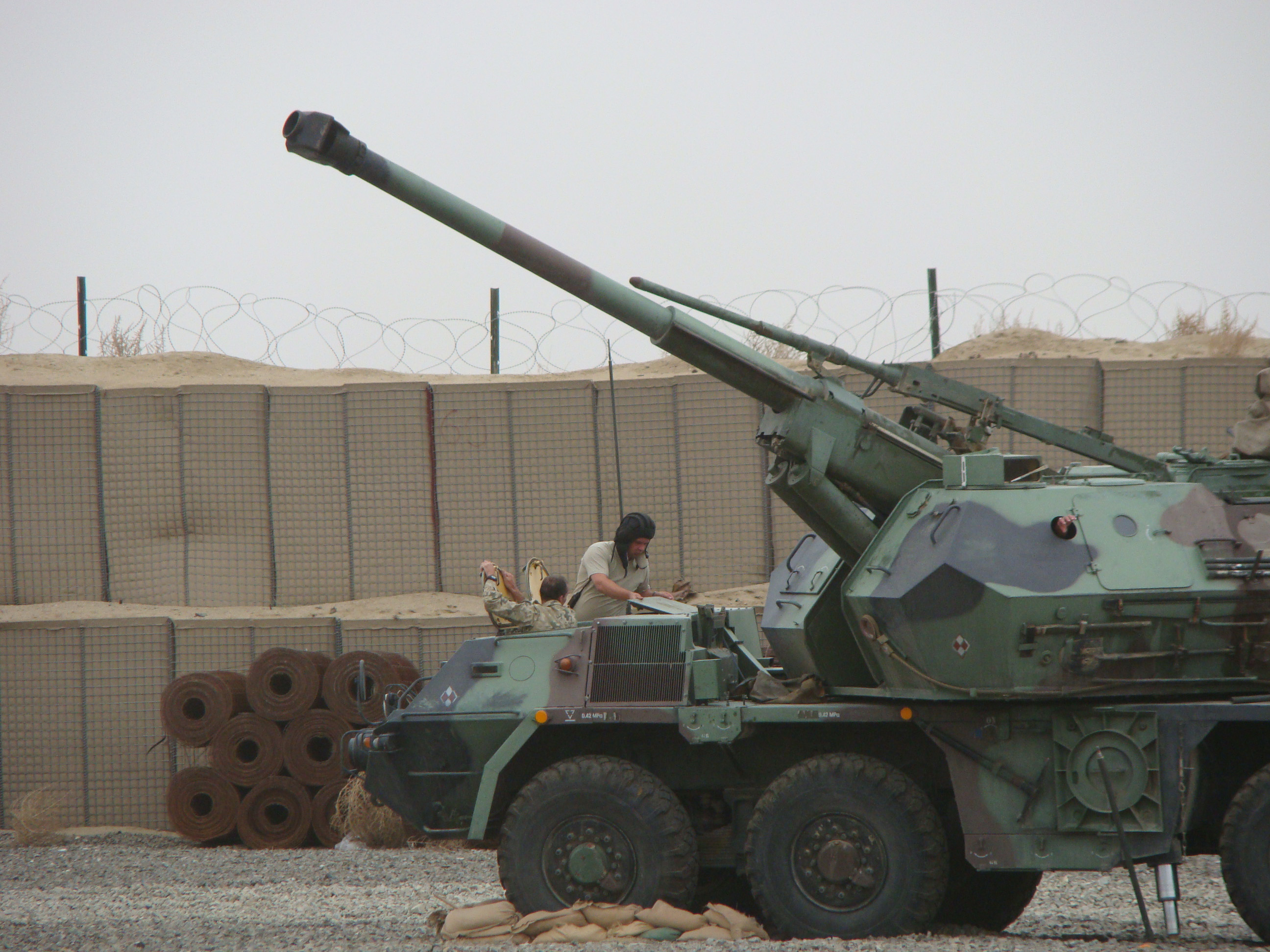
Polish artillery supporting Polish, U.S. and Afghan forces in Afghanistan

Used by Georgia against Russia during the Russo-Georgian War. Two Georgian DANAs were destroyed and three or four captured in 2008.

Used by Poland during the War in Afghanistan (2001–2021). Five Polish DANAs had been used in Afghanistan in Ghazni Province since 2008.

Used by Azerbaijan in the Second Nagorno-Karbakh War against Armenia.

=== Ukraine ===
Currently in service with Ukraine since the 2022 Russian invasion of Ukraine after 13 152 mm SpGH DANA vz. 77 and an unknown number of 152 mm SpGH DANA M2 were supplied by the Czech Republic in 2022.

So far, four vz. 77 DANAs have been destroyed, with another four being damaged.

== Operators ==
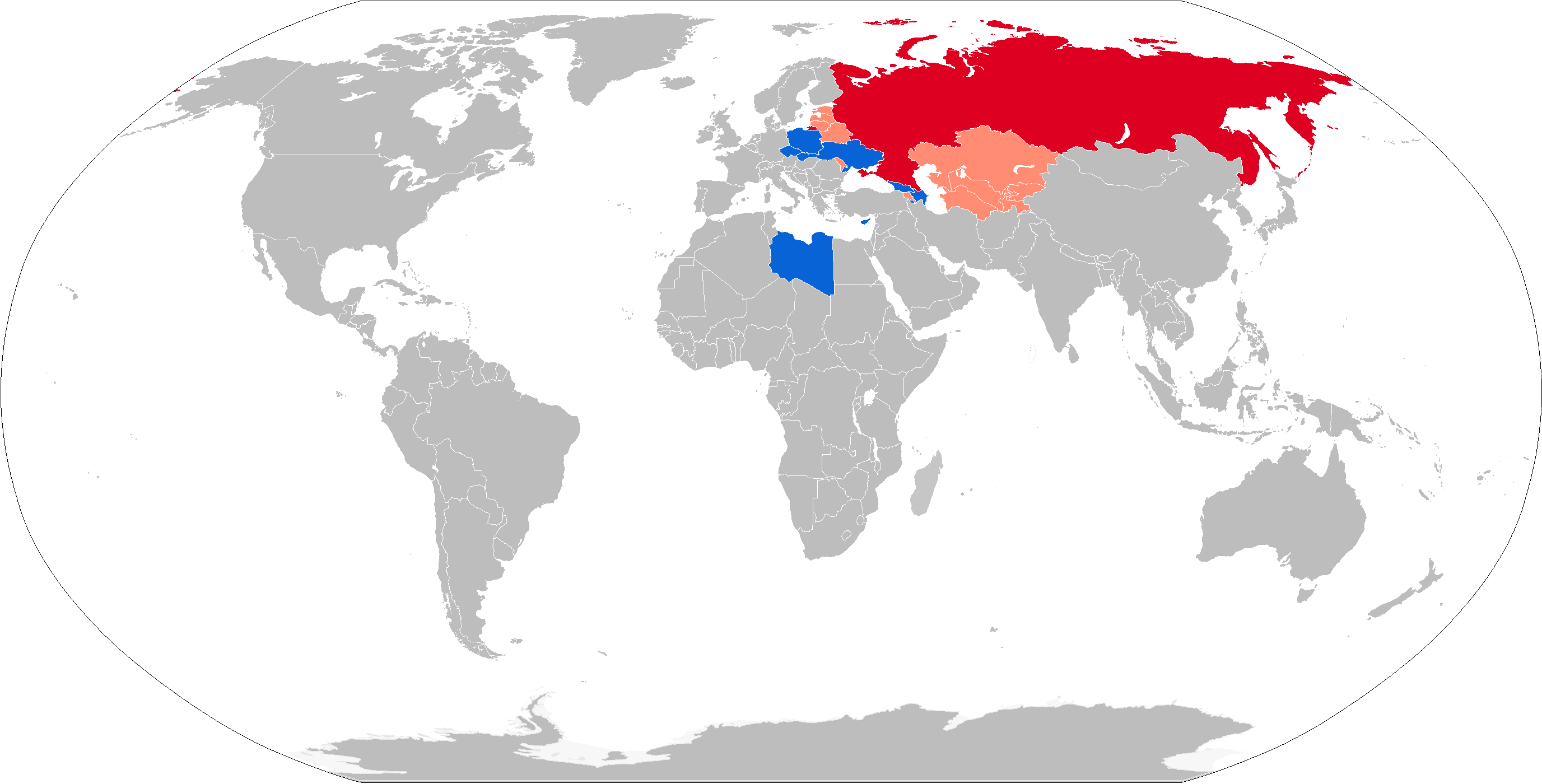
Current operators Former operators (as part of the Soviet Union) Former operators

=== Current operators ===
- Azerbaijan – 36 DANA M1.
- Czech Republic – 164 vz. 77 (to 1 July 2008) of original 273.
- Poland – 111 vz. 77
- Georgia – 47 vz. 77 delivered by the Czech Republic from 2004.
- Ukraine
  - DANA vz. 77
    - 13 vz. 77 were supplied by the Czech Republic in 2022.
  - DANA M2:
    - 26 M2 were ordered by Ukraine in 2020.
    - An unknown number of M2 were supplied by the Czech Republic in 2022.
  - Zuzana 2: (24)
    - Slovak Ministry of Defence announced the donation of eight Zuzana 2 in May 2022, with delivery being completed in January 2023.
    - Germany, Norway and Denmark agreed to purchase further 16 Zuzana 2 for delivery to Ukraine in 2022.
  - DITA: (15)
    - Netherlands financed the purchase of nine DITA for Ukraine on February 2024, all of which were delivered in summer of 2024.
    - Another six DITA have been purchased by Netherlands on behalf of Ukraine in October of the same year.

=== Future operators ===
- Azerbaijan – 70 DITA ordered in May 2024 to Excalibur Army.
- Latvia – 18 MORANA ordered in September 2026.

=== Former operators ===
- Czechoslovakia – 408, passed on to successor states the Czech Republic (273) and Slovakia (135).
- Libya – 80 delivered in the 1980s. All had been retired in the 1990s.
- Slovakia – 135 vz. 77 were inherited from Czechoslovakia, were later retired, currently no longer in service.
- Soviet Union – 150 delivered by Czechoslovakia between 1986 and 1990.

== Comparable weapons ==
- 155 mm SpGH Zuzana – Slovak 155mm self-propelled gun-howitzer
- 155 mm SpGH EVA – Slovak 155 mm self-propelled howitzer
- Archer Artillery System – Swedish self-propelled howitzer
- ATMOS 2000 – Israeli 155 mm self-propelled howitzer
- A-222E Bereg-E 130mm coastal mobile artillery system – Russian self-propelled coastal defense gun
- 2S22 Bohdana – Ukrainian 155 mm self-propelled howitzer
- CAESAR self-propelled howitzer – French 155 mm artillery
- G6 Rhino – South African 155 mm self-propelled artillery
- AHS Kryl – Polish 155 mm self-propelled wheeled gun-howitzer
- Nora B-52 – Serbian 155 mm self-propelled howitzer
- PCL-09 – Chinese 122 mm self-propelled howitzer
- PCL-161 – Chinese 122 mm self-propelled howitzer
- PCL-181 – Chinese 155mm self-propelled howitzer
- PLL-09 – Chinese amphibious wheeled armoured fighting vehicle family
- Type 19 155 mm wheeled self-propelled howitzer – Japanese artillery
