= AHS Kryl =

Polish 155 mm self-propelled wheeled gun-howitzer

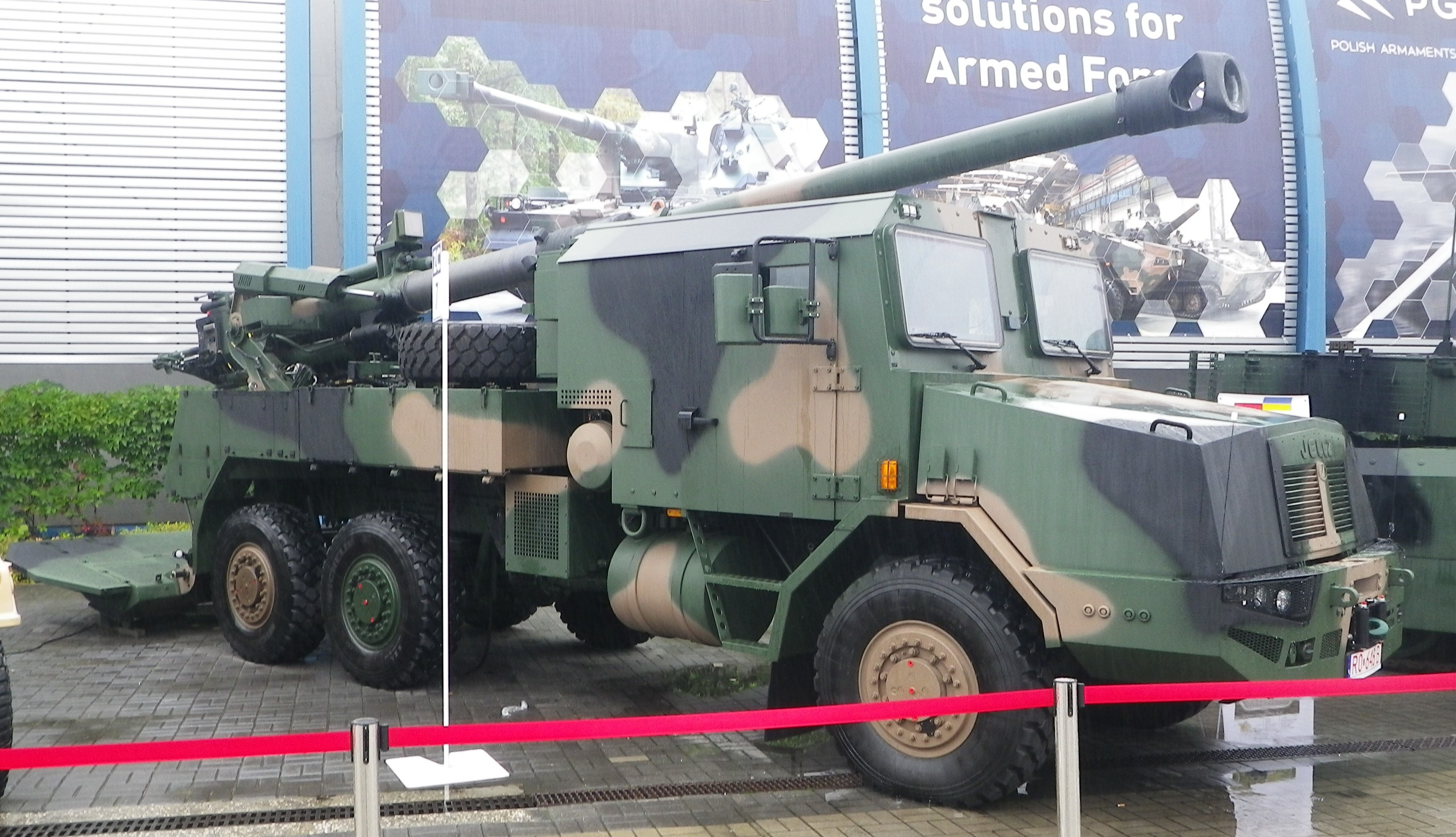
Kryl prototype (2017)

The AHS Kryl is a 155 mm NATO-compatible self-propelled wheeled howitzer (or more precisely a gun-howitzer) designed in Poland by Centrum Produkcji Wojskowej Huta Stalowa Wola. It is a licensed copy of the Israeli ATMOS 2000 52-caliber gun mounted on a Polish Jelcz 663 armoured 6×6 chassis and integrating WB Electronics' "Topaz" artillery fire control system.

The prototype was built by June 2014. A series production was planned from 2021 but never started.

== Comparable artillery systems ==
- Archer – (Sweden)
- ATMOS 2000 – (Israel)
- A-222 Bereg – (Russia)
- 2S22 Bohdana – (Ukraine)
- CAESAR self-propelled howitzer – (France)
- 152 mm SpGH DANA – (Czechoslovakia)
- G6 howitzer – (South Africa)
- Nora B-52 – (Serbia)
- PCL-09 – (China)
- PCL-161 – (China)
- PCL-181 – (China)
- PLL-09 – (China)
- Type 19 155 mm wheeled self-propelled howitzer – (Japan)
- 155 mm SpGH Zuzana – (Slovakia)

== See also ==
- AHS Krab – Polish 155 mm self-propelled howitzer
- Nora B-52 – Serbian 155 mm self-propelled howitzer
