= 2S22 Bohdana =

Ukrainian 155 mm self-propelled howitzer

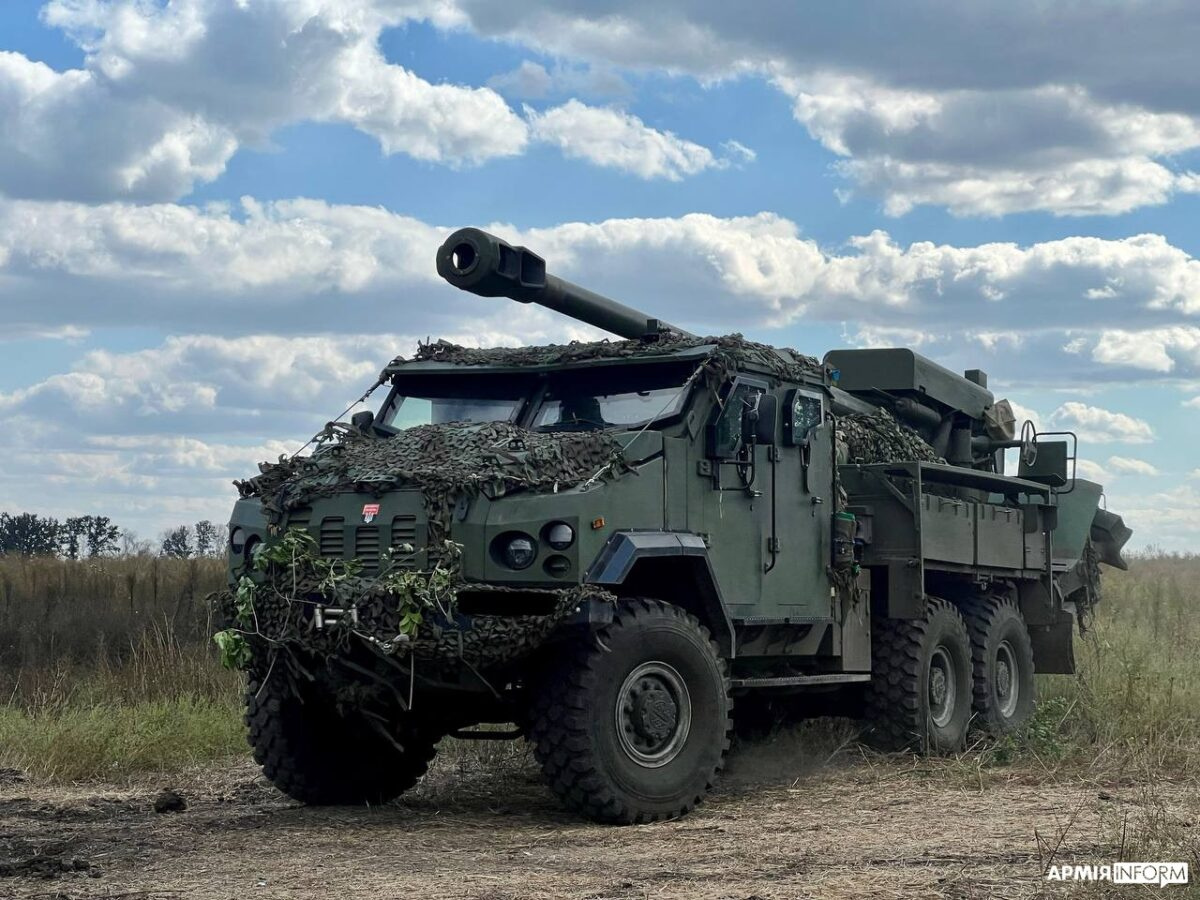
- 2S22 Bohdana 2.0 on MAZ chassis
- Type: Self-propelled howitzer
- Place of origin: Ukraine

Service history
- In service: 2022–present
- Used by: See § Operators
- Wars: Russo-Ukrainian War

Production history
- Designer: Kramatorsk Heavy Duty Machine Tool Plant
- Designed: 2016–2022
- Unit cost: US$2.5 million
- Produced: 2023–present
- No. built: 600+ (this number may include 2P22 Bohdana)
- Variants: See § Variants

Specifications
- Mass: 28 tonnes (62,000 lb)
- Crew: 5
- Rate of fire: 5 rounds per minute
- Maximum firing range: 42–60 km (26–37 mi)
- Main armament: 155 mm (6.1 in) howitzer
- Engine: 380–420 hp (280–310 kW)
- Operational range: 800 km (500 mi) (road); 300 km (190 mi) (off-road)
- Maximum speed: 80 km/h (50 mph) (road)

The 2S22 Bohdana is a 155 mm 52-caliber NATO standard, wheeled self-propelled howitzer developed in Ukraine. Its prototype is mounted on the chassis of the Ukrainian six-wheel-drive KrAZ-6322 truck. It has an armoured cabin and storage for 20 shells. The howitzer has an effective range of 42 km (26 mi) with conventional shells and 60 km (37 mi) with rocket-assisted projectiles according to the manufacturer manuals. It can fire several types of shells including the extended-range M982 Excalibur at a rate of five rounds per minute.

== Background ==
In the early 2010s, the Tasko Corporation presented a proof of concept for a wheeled 155 mm howitzer destined for domestic and export markets. The Tasko prototype consisted of a 155 mm L/45 or 155 mm L/52 caliber barrel with a muzzle brake mounted on a KrAZ-6322 6×6 chassis powered by a V8 turbocharged diesel engine developing 265 hp (198 kW) at 3,000 rpm. According to Tasko, the 155 mm L/45 caliber version had a range of 39.6 km (24.6 mi) while the 155 mm L/52 caliber version had a range of 42 km (26 mi), presumably using High Explosive Base Bleed (HE-BB) shells.

The prototype had a crew of six and carried 16 155 mm projectiles and propellant charges. The system could be taken in and out of action in one minute and was also capable of quick-firing three rounds in 15 seconds. While the chassis lacked an armoured cab, it did include a central tire pressure regulation system, allowing the driver to adjust the pressure of the tires to better suit the terrain being crossed.

According to Roblin, the development of the Bohdana, which could be traced back to a proposed truck-mounted design back in 2009, would only begin in 2016. During the War in Donbas, Ukraine only had a handful of long-ranged self-propelled howitzers capable of shoot and scoot to avoid Russian counter-battery fire, like the 2S19 Msta-S (around 35 pre-war), and the older 2S5 Giatsint-S and 2S7 Pion (13 and 18 in service before the war, respectively), underscoring the need for more and better artillery systems.

Ukraine's supply of Soviet-standard 152 mm shells also proved problematic as the primary producer is Russia. The choice of a NATO-standard caliber was made on the assumption that 155 mm shells could be procured from more sympathetic countries.

== Development ==
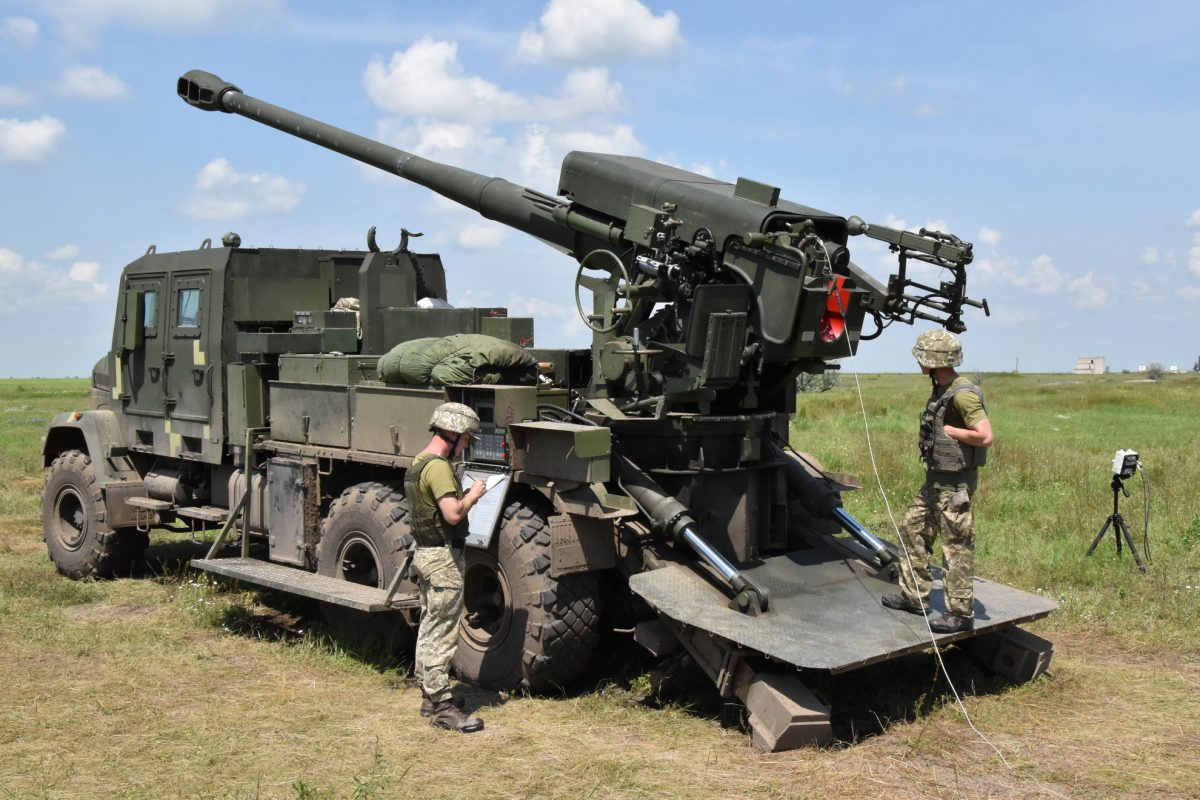
Bohdana 1.0 during firing trials, 2021

The howitzer underwent live fire tests in 2018, while its first public display was in the Kyiv Independence Day Parade on 24 August 2018. Development was nearly halted in 2020 due difficulties obtaining 155 mm shells at the time, legal disputes between the government and manufacturer, temporary cancellation of the program funding, and excessive recoil that would be eventually solved with the introduction of an improved muzzle brake.

Another round of test firings were conducted at the Shyrokyi Lan training area} in May 2021. Further test firings were carried out at a range in Odesa Oblast in December 2021 and January 2022, where 450 shots were fired at a range of 42 km, greater than the manufacturer's specification of 40 km (25 mi).

== Production ==
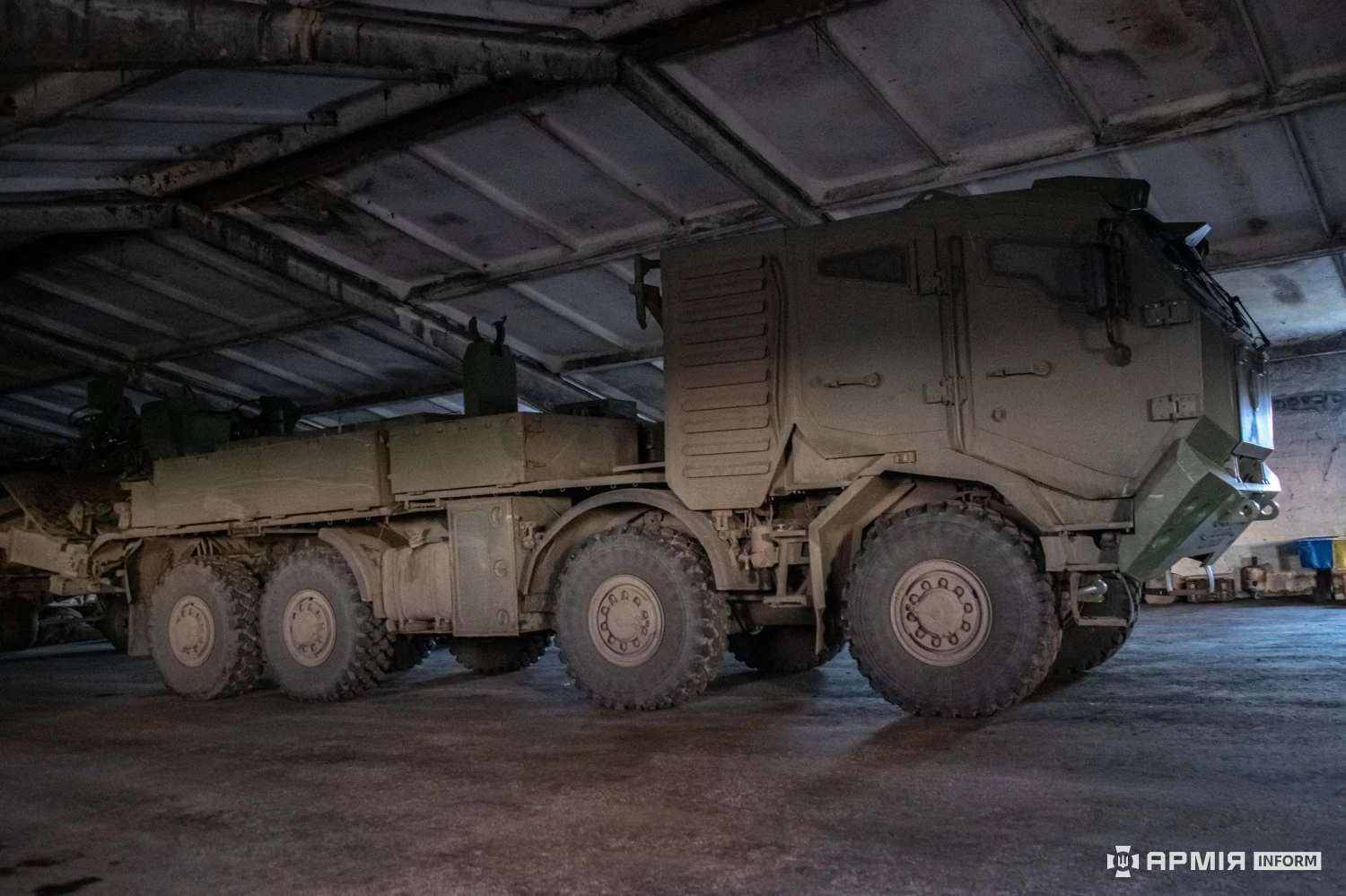
Bohdana 3.0 undergoing maintenance

Ukrainian Defense Minister Oleksii Reznikov said at the beginning of 2023 that serial mass production of an improved Bohdana had started. With Ukraine unable to import additional MAZ-6317 chassis from Russia-aligned Belarus, and the original KrAZ-6332 chassis largely dependent on a Russian-made engine, Reznikov suggested that they could be replaced with a six-wheeled KrAZ or MAN chassis or an eight-wheeled Tatra. Production Bohdanas initially used a Tatra 815-7 8×8 truck chassis fitted with an armoured cab. Militarnyi reported that the Tatras had likely been bought to be used as chassis for the Burevyi multiple rocket launcher, which ran out of ammunition during the first year of the Russian invasion. As of 2025, production Bohdanas use a Tatra Phoenix 8×8 chassis instead.

In December 2023, it was reported by Eсonomichna Pravda that the Ukrainian Ground Forces had already received around 30 Bohdanas, and that a towed version was under development. Early production versions of the Bohdana lacked some features such as autoloaders and ballistic radars, which were eventually incorporated into the newest models.

With support from the European Union, the production rate of the Bohdana increased from six per month in 2023 to more than 20 by 2025. According to Arsen Zhumadilov, director of the Ukrainian Defense Ministry's defense procurement agency, more than 85% of the components of the Bohdana are produced locally, and by the end of 2025 it's expected that this proportion will increase to 95%. In July 2024, Denmark placed an order for 18 Bohdanas and in September of the same year, they were handed over to the Ukrainian Armed Forces according to the Danish Defense Minister Troels Lund Poulsen. According to Nordjyske frozen Russian assets were used to finance the 1.3 billion kroner order.

On 3 October 2024, a prototype of a towed Bohdana, mounted on the carriage of a 2A36 Giatsint-B, was seen for the first time. On 24 March 2025, the press service of the 47th Artillery Brigade released photos showing crews deploying and firing the towed howitzer.

Ukraine manufactured a total of 154 artillery systems in 2024, according to President Zelenskyy. While he did not specify exact types, military analysts suggest that the 2S22 Bohdana is probably included.

== Variants ==
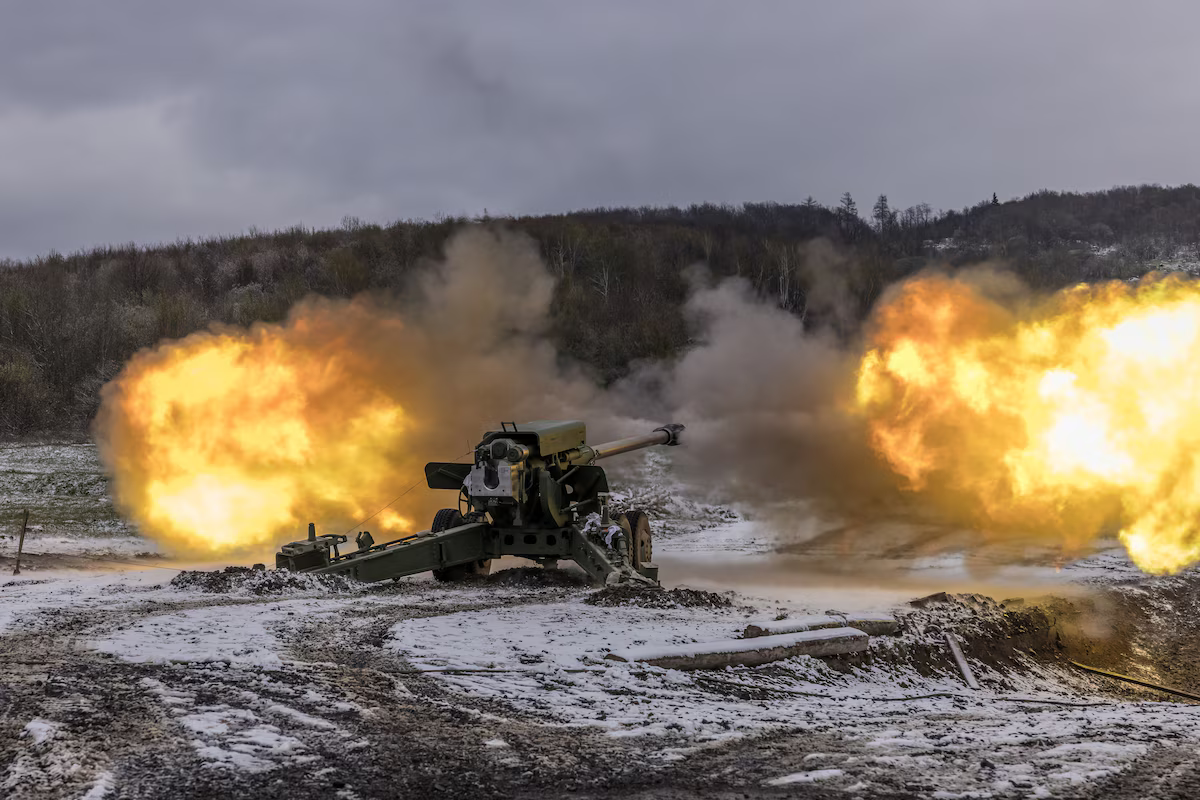
2P22 Bohdana-BG during acceptance trials

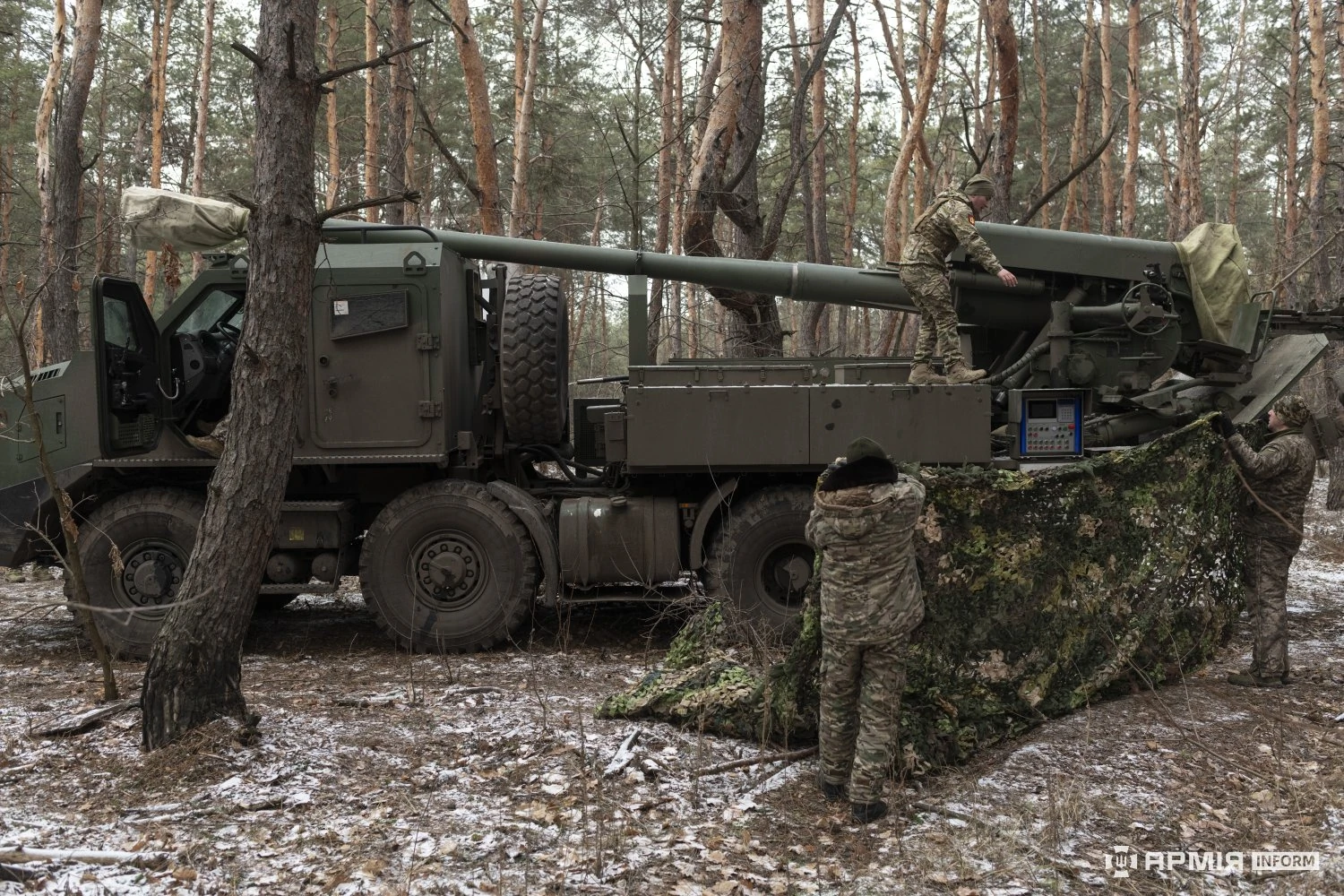
Bohdana 4.0 in service with the 45th Artillery Brigade

Bohdana (Bohdana 1.0)
Original production version. Mounted on a KrAZ-63221 6×6 truck chassis
Bohdana 2.0
Mounted on a MAZ-6317 6x6 chassis. Improved variant with redesigned armored cabin and other improvements including the ability to fire American Excalibur shells.
Bohdana 3.0
Mounted on a Tatra 815-7 8x8 chassis, equipped with a Czech Puma armored cabin.
Bohdana 4.0
Mounted on a Tatra 158 Phoenix 8×8 chassis, equipped with an armored cabin designed by the local company Ukrainian Armor and featuring a semi-automatic loading system.
Bohdana 5.0
Latest production variant, mounted on a Tatra Force 8x8 chassis. Visually similar to variant 3.0, except for the locally-produced cab which has a distinct front grille and cab side-louvres.
Bohdana 6.0
Projected variant, based on a MAN or Mercedes-Benz Zetros truck, 200 financed by Germany for the Ukrainian Ground Forces.
2P22 Bohdana-BG
A family of towed howitzers using the same barrel as the self-propelled 2S22. Normally towed by a KrAZ-6322 truck or a MT-LB tracked transport.

== Operational history ==
On 25 February 2022, at the start of the Russian invasion of Ukraine, the Bohdana's manufacturers were ordered to destroy the sole prototype, to prevent the Russians from capturing it. However, it was able to be moved away from the Russians and handed to the Ukrainian Armed Forces. On 7 May 2022, Forbes reported that the prototype had been deployed at the front and was firing at Russian targets.

In June 2022, Ukrainian forces on the mainland of Ukraine reportedly used the 2S22 Bohdana to shell Russian forces on Snake Island, which is 35 km (22 mi) from the mainland. This along with strikes from other artillery systems as well as drones led to the withdrawal of Russian forces from the island on 30 June.

The 2S22 Bohdana was officially adopted by the Ukrainian Armed Forces on 21 July 2023. In the meantime, the Kramatorsk factory managed to assemble two pre-production Bohdanas (mounted on the MAZ-6317 chassis) for the 57th Motorized Brigade. These would see action in the Kherson and Bakhmut regions. Some National Guard and National Police units such as the 18th Sloviansk Brigade and the Liut Brigade are also equipped with Bohdanas.

== Operators ==
- Ukraine
  - Ukrainian Ground Forces − 350 in active service as of February 2026
  - National Guard of Ukraine
  - National Police of Ukraine

== See also ==
- Archer – Swedish self-propelled howitzer
- ATMOS 2000 – Israeli 155 mm self-propelled howitzer
- A-222 Bereg – Russian self-propelled coastal defense gun
- CAESAR – French 155 mm artillery
- 152 mm SpGH DANA – Czechoslovak self-propelled howitzer
- G6 Rhino – South African 155 mm self-propelled artillery
- AHS Kryl – Polish 155 mm self-propelled wheeled gun-howitzer
- 2S43 Malva – Russian 152 mm self-propelled howitzer
- Nora B-52 – Serbian 155 mm self-propelled howitzer
- PCL-09 – Chinese 122 mm self-propelled howitzer
- PCL-161 – Chinese 122 mm self-propelled howitzer
- PCL-181 – Chinese 155mm self-propelled howitzer
- PLL-09 – (China) – 122 mm or 155 mm self-propelled howitzer
- RCH 155 - German 155 mm self-propelled howitzer
- Type 19 155 mm wheeled self-propelled howitzer – Japanese artillery
- 155 mm SpGH Zuzana – Slovak 155mm self-propelled gun-howitzer
