= Nora B-52 =

Serbian 155 mm self-propelled howitzer

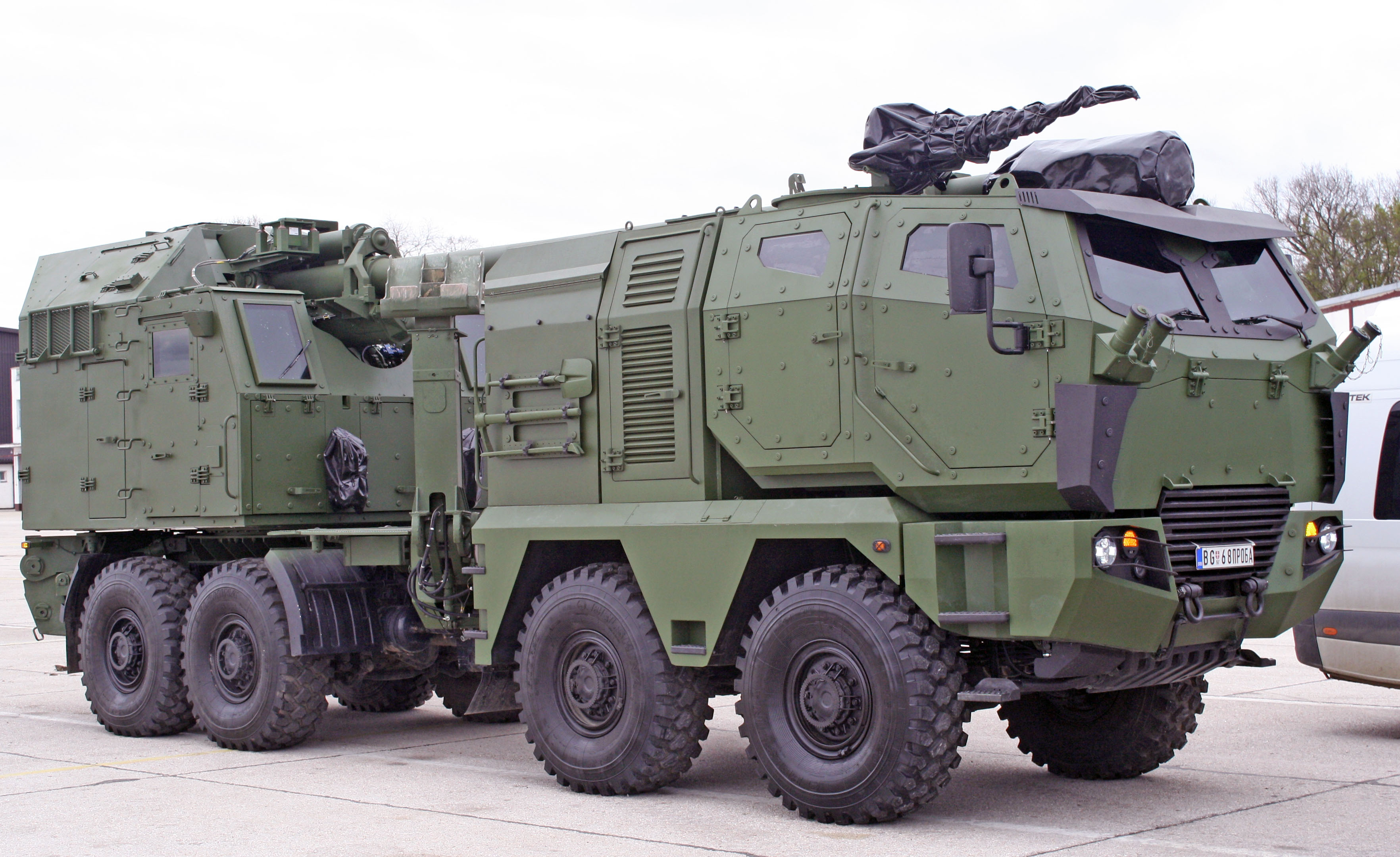
- Nora B-52 M21
- Type: Self-propelled artillery
- Place of origin: Serbia

Service history
- Used by: See § Operators

Production history
- Designer: Military Technical Institute
- Manufacturer: Yugoimport SDPR
- Unit cost: $0.7 million (2020) $2.0 million (2021) $7.06 million (2024)
- Produced: 2006–present
- No. built: 114+ delivered 108 more on order

Specifications
- Mass: 34 tonnes (K-I); 27.4 - 28 tonnes (K0, K1, M03); 25 tonnes (MGS-25)
- Length: 11000 mm
- Width: 2950 mm
- Height: 3450 mm
- Crew: 3–5
- Elevation: -3° to +65°
- Traverse: 60°
- Rate of fire: 6–12 projectiles per minute (depending on version) first 3 rounds in 20 seconds
- Maximum firing range: 56km (HE ERFB/RA-BB VLAP)
- Armor: STANAG 4569 Level II on the front and back, STANAG 4569 Level I on the sides, mine protection STANAG 4569 Level 2A and 2B, NBC protection through a pressurized hull and filter-ventilation system (K-I)
- Main armament: 155 mm/52-calibre (23 liter chamber) or 155 mm/52-calibre (25 liter chamber)
- Secondary armament: 7,62mm machinegun 7,62mm or 12,7mm RCWS can also be installed Optional coaxial 20mm cannon.
- Engine: turbo diesel 410 hp
- Suspension: 8x8 off-road wheels
- Operational range: 1,000 km (620 mi), at speed of 80 km/h (50 mph) for K-I version
- Maximum speed: Paved road: 90 km/h (56 mph); Unpaved road: 25 km/h (16 mph); Off-road: 15 km/h (9.3 mph)

The Nora B-52 is a Serbian 155 mm self-propelled howitzer designed by the Military Technical Institute and manufactured by Yugoimport SDPR.

== History ==
The first self-propelled Nora B (developed on the basis of the Nora C) was designed by the Military Technical Institute in 1984 with a modified 152 mm Nora M-84 howitzer mounted on a FAP 8x8 truck bed. It belonged to the third generation of artillery systems. Later, in the 2000s, the Military Technical Institute developed a new fourth generation artillery system with a 52 caliber 155 mm gun for integration on a new system of the Nora family with the B-52 designation.

By 2013, Serbia had exported the K1, KE, KI variants, as well as reconnaissance BOV M11, command (BOV M10) and battery fire control and meteorological vehicles, ammunition loading trucks, artillery battlefield software for platoon, battery and division level to the armed forces of Myanmar, Kenya, and Bangladesh. One fully equipped battery usually consists of 6–12 self-propelled howitzers, 1–2 BOV M11 reconnaissance vehicles, three BOV M10 command vehicles (1 for each platoon and 1 for battery command), 3–6 munition trucks, a communications and workshop vehicle, 2–3 general supply vehicles (fuel, food, water, etc.) and 1–2 fire direction and gunfire locator vehicles with radar and sound ranging. With the order for Cyprus, the new BOV M16 Miloš was delivered as the artillery reconnaissance and artillery battery command vehicle instead of the BOV M11.

== Variants ==
The Nora B-52 is made in the following versions:

- K0 – first serial variant, open turret, manual power drive and line of sight.
- K1(S) – semi-open turret, full automatic, independent automatic navigation, automatic fire and control system, smaller crew number.
- M03 (S) – semi-open turret, automatic based on K0, K1 designs, with S designation for Serbian Army.
- KE – semi-open turret, full automatic export variant.
- K-I (M15) – additional armored full automatic with closed turret, new stronger chassis, radar on barrel for measuring projectile trajectory and speed, NBC protected cabin and turret, automated fire-suspension system, smoke grenade launcher, intercom for crew and new software; with M15 designation for Serbian Army.
- M21 – upgraded variant featuring STANAG 4569 level 2 protection.
- NG – upgraded variant with increased auto-loader capacity (30 in the auto-loader with additional 6 on the vehicle), 60 second deployment time and fully automatic fire data setting.
- MGS-25 Aleksandar – newest variant featuring a rate of fire of 6 rounds per minute and a maximum firing range of 32.5 km with standard ammunition and 56 km with the 155 mm HE ERFB RA/BB (VLAP), laser guided long range ammunition, smaller crew, 12 rounds ready for fire in a revolver type of automatic loader, 12 additional ammunition that are stored in a storage box located at back behind the crew cabin and engine-hydraulic compartment, smaller weight (~25 tonnes), automatic levelling of the gun towards the north, new smoke and light grenade. Due to a high level of automation of all functions, it can be remotely controlled by the crew up to 100 meters from the vehicle. As a fully autonomous module, it can be mounted on different trucks chassis (such as Kamaz or MAN).

The K designation is applied to vehicles that use a Kamaz chassis, the number refers to the orientation of the main weapon in relation to the north and the letter for the level of equipment and/or export designation.

All versions have differences in chassis, armour, turret, loading and support systems. All versions with an automatic loader have multiple rounds simultaneous impact capability. Standard equipment includes a computerized fire control system and a land navigation system. Ballistic protection is provided against small arms fire, shell splinters and some mines. For training and simulation purposes, a special computer simulator was developed by the Mihajlo Pupin Institute that includes terrain maps of the customers' respective countries. This system has the ability to train the crews of an entire battalion of 18 self-propelled howitzers, including for the designation of targets.

== Ammunition ==
The system can fire several different types of ammunition, including domestic and foreign 155mm projectiles, which are JBMOU-compatible. Depending on the typo of ammunition used, different maximum ranges and effects on target can be achieved.

Designation	Type	Range in m	Caliber	Note
M107	HE M88	32,000	155 mm	produced by Sloboda
M04	ERFB	34,000	155 mm	produced by Sloboda
M03	ERFB	26,600	155 mm	produced by Yugoimport
M02	ERFB/BB	41,850	155 mm	produced by Sloboda
M19	HEER-BB M19	38,000	155 mm	produced by Yugoimport
M15	HE ERFB RA/BB	41,100	155 mm	produced by Sloboda
Krasnopol	BB	30,000	155 mm	produced by KBP
M982 Excalibur	BB	40,000	155 mm	produced Raytheon
not designated	HE V-LAP	67,000	155 mm	in development by Yugoimport SDPR

== Operators ==
Map of current Nora B-52 operators as of September 2026.

=== Current operators ===
- Azerbaijan – Nora B-52 self-propelled howitzers are operated by the Azerbaijani Land Forces. A total of 48 Nora B-52NGs were reportedly contracted in 2024. The system was officially presented as newly accepted into Azerbaijani service during the November 2025 Victory Parade in Baku. A second batch was reported to be transferred from Serbia in June 2026.
- Bangladesh – 18 Nora B-52 self-propelled howitzers are reported in service with the Bangladesh Army.
- Cyprus – 24 in service with the Cypriot National Guard.
- Kenya – At least 18 Nora B-52 self-propelled howitzers were acquired from Serbia and are reported in service with the Kenya Army.
- Myanmar – 30 Nora B-52 self-propelled howitzers are reported in service with the Myanmar Army.
- Serbia – At least 24 Nora B-52 M15 self-propelled howitzers are in service with the Serbian Army's Mixed Artillery Brigade. In January 2024, the Serbian government announced the procurement of 8 additional Nora howitzers.

=== Potential operators ===
- Algeria – Algeria was reported in 2023 to be negotiating the acquisition of approximately 50–54 Nora B-52 self-propelled howitzers for the Algerian People's National Army, reportedly in the M21 configuration. No official contract or delivery has been publicly confirmed.

=== Evaluation only ===
- Brazil
- Pakistan – tested by the Pakistan Army in 2017.
- United Arab Emirates – tested by the United Arab Emirates Army in 2017.
- United States – tested by the U.S. Army in 2021 together with the Archer Artillery System, the CAESAR self-propelled howitzer, and the ATMOS 2000. The K9 Thunder was selected in August 2026.

== Gallery ==
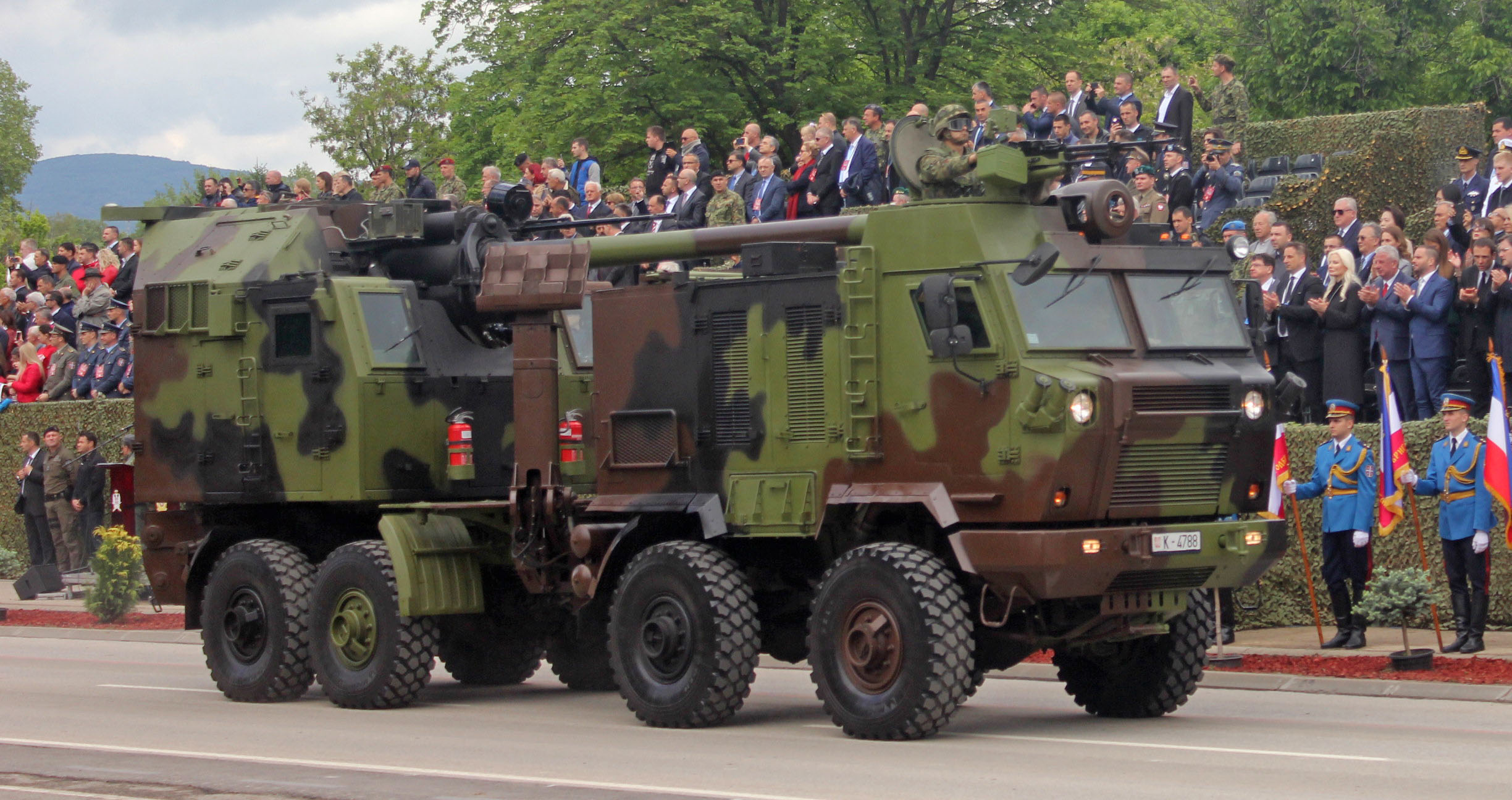
Nora B-52 M21 of Serbian Army

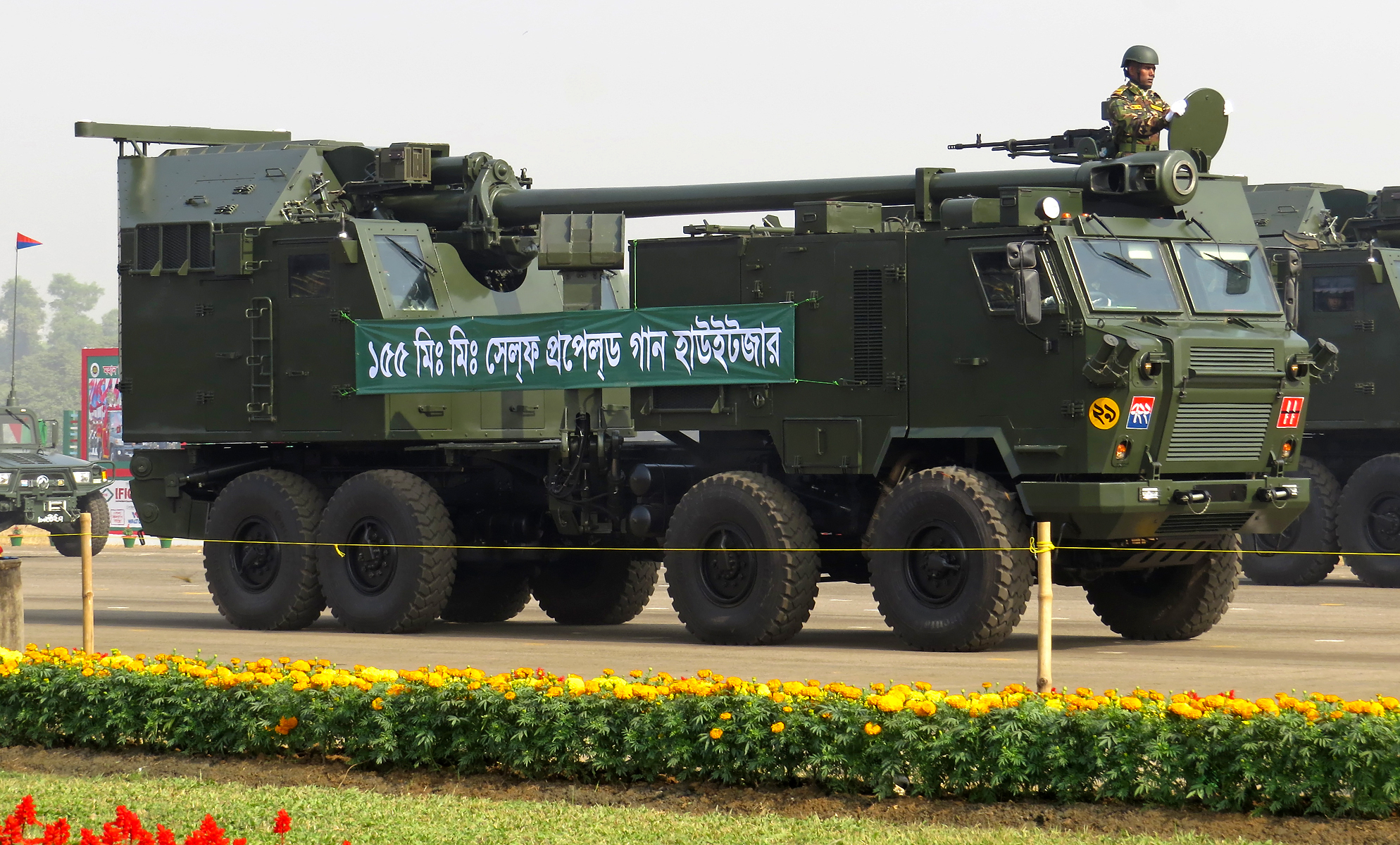
Nora B-52 K1 of Bangladeshi Army

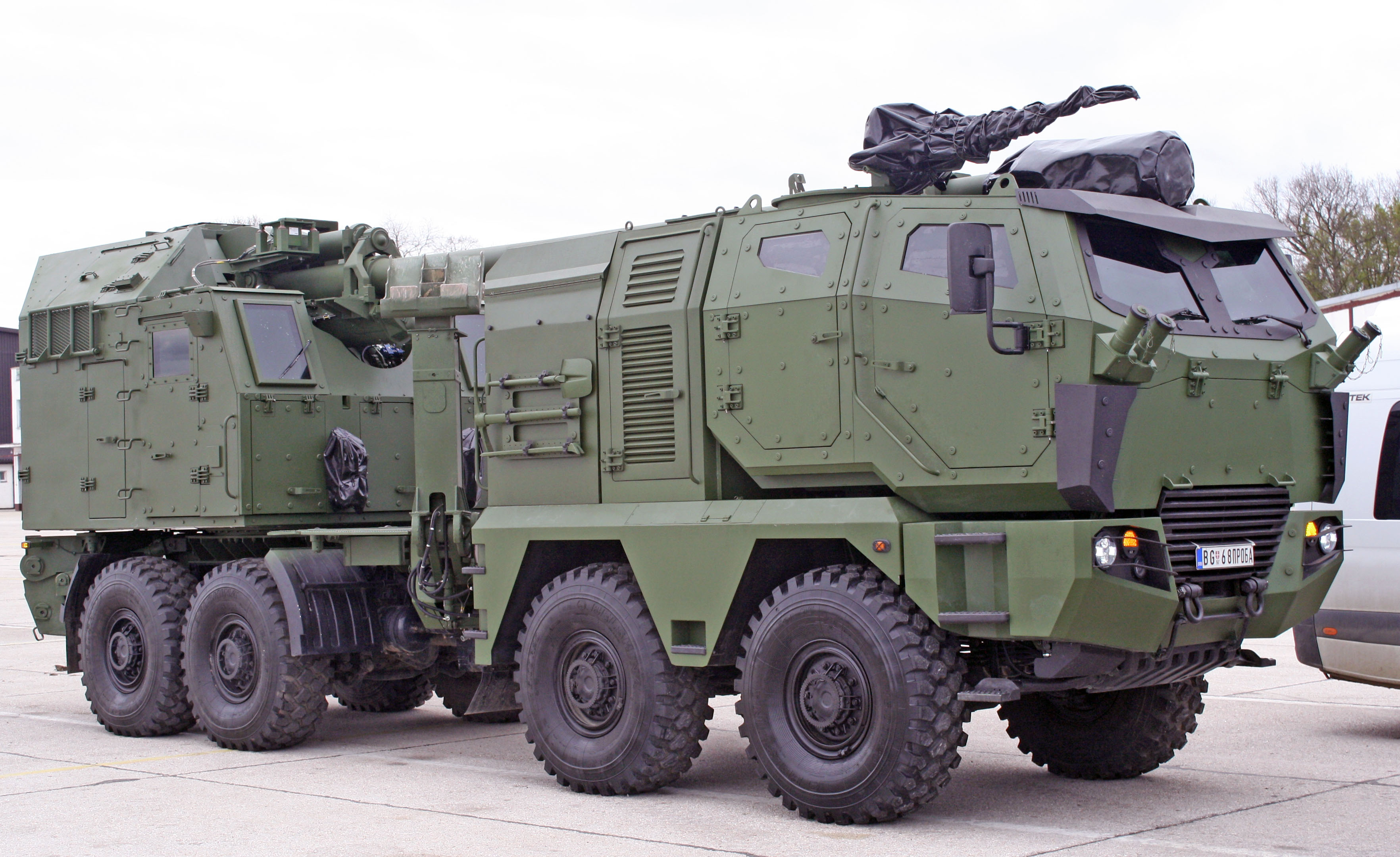
Nora B-52 NG

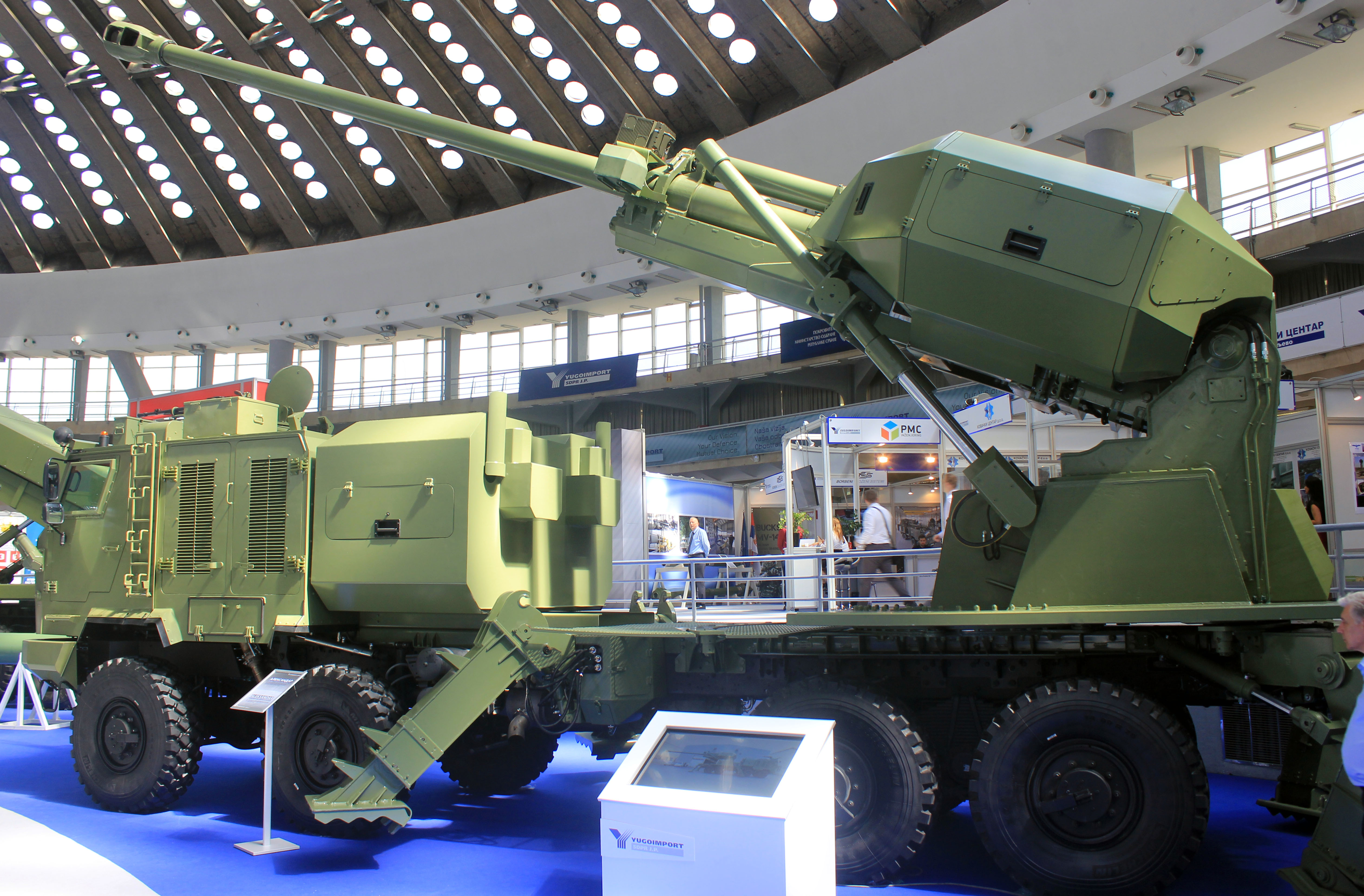
MGS-25 Aleksandar

== See also ==
- Archer Artillery System – (Sweden)
- Advanced Towed Artillery Gun System – (India)
- ATMOS 2000 – (Israel)
- A-222 Bereg (artillery system) – (Russia)
- 2S22 Bohdana – (Ukraine)
- CAESAR self-propelled howitzer – (France)
- 152 mm SpGH DANA – (Czechoslovakia)
- G6 howitzer – (South Africa)
- AHS Kryl – (Poland)
- PCL-09 – (China)
- PCL-161 – (China)
- PCL-181 – (China)
- PLL-09 – (China)
- Type 19 155 mm wheeled self-propelled howitzer – (Japan)
- 155 mm SpGH Zuzana – (Slovakia)
