= PCL-181 =

Chinese 155mm self-propelled howitzer

- Type: Self-propelled howitzer
- Place of origin: China

Service history
- In service: 2019–present
- Used by: See § Operators
- Wars: 2025 India–Pakistan conflict

Production history
- Designer: Nanjing University of Science and Technology
- Manufacturer: Norinco

Specifications
- Mass: 25 t (25 long tons; 28 short tons)
- Length: 6.5 m (21 ft 4 in) (SH-15)
- Width: 2.66 m (8 ft 9 in) (SH-15)
- Height: <3.6 m (11 ft 10 in)
- Crew: 6
- Caliber: 155 mm (6.1 in)
- Barrels: 52 caliber
- Breech: Semi-automatic vertical wedge type breech block
- Elevation: Around 20° to 70° (except for front due to cab)
- Traverse: 360°
- Rate of fire: 4–6 rounds/min (SH-15)
- Effective firing range: 20 km (12 mi) (conventional projectile)
- Maximum firing range: 53 km (33 mi) (rocket-assisted projectile)
- Main armament: PLL-01 155 mm howitzer gun
- Engine: diesel
- Drive: 6×6
- Suspension: hydropneumatic suspension
- Maximum speed: 90 km/h (56 mph)

The PCL-181 is a Chinese truck-mounted, 155 mm self-propelled howitzer used by the People's Liberation Army Ground Force (PLAGF). The designation "PCL" is an acronym derived from pinyin (Chinese: 炮车榴弹炮; pinyin: Pào Chē Liúdànpào; lit. 'Artillery', 'Vehicle', 'Howitzer').

== Development ==
The PCL-181 made its first public appearance during the 70th Chinese National Day Parade on 1 October 2019.

It was designed to replace the 152 mm (6.0 in) PL-66 towed gun-howitzer and the 130 mm (5.1 in) Type 59-1 towed field guns used by the PLAGF and will complement the PLZ-05, and improve upon its functionality in many ways.

== Design ==
=== Armament ===
The gun has a 52-caliber barrel and is exactly the same as that of the PLZ-05 self-propelled howitzer. It has a maximum firing range of up to 40 km (25 mi) with conventional ammunition and 72 km (45 mi) with extended range ammunition. The gun can also fire laser-guided munition, which is capable of all-weather operation. Each vehicle can carry 27 rounds of ammunition.

The vehicle features a semi-automatic ammo loader, where the operator places the shell on the loading arm, which loads the round into the breech. The PCL-181 is equipped with an automatic fire-control system. Following the operator's input of a target's azimuth data, the vehicle-mounted computer can calculate the trajectory of the artillery, and automatically lay the gun.

=== Mobility ===
The PCL-181 is based on Taian GM's 6×6 truck chassis. The PCL-181 is fitted with hydropneumatic suspension, allowing better gun elevation and depression. Due to its comparatively lighter weight of 25 tons, the PCL-181 can also be transported in a Shaanxi Y-9.

== Operational history ==
=== China ===
In 2020, according to Chinese state media, most of the country's five military jurisdictions, known as theater commands, have been equipped with PCL-181 155 mm vehicle-mounted howitzers.

In June 2020, it was reported that the PCL-181 had been deployed in the Tibet Autonomous Region amid tensions with India. In February 2021, it was reported that at least 18 PCL-181s had been inducted into the PLAGF's Xinjiang Military Command.

=== Pakistan ===
In 2019, Pakistan signed a contract for 236 SH-15s. Deliveries started in January 2022, and the SH-15s participated in the Pakistan Day parade on March 23, 2022. As per sources, Pakistan may have acquired transfer of technology to further build these self-propelled howitzers locally at Heavy Industries Taxila. Pakistan acquired it in response to India's acquisition of the K9 thunder self-propelled howitzer.

The SH-15s are Pakistan Army's first 155 mm/52-caliber gun. It is capable of firing VLAP rounds that have a range of 50 km. For example, Pakistan ordered 1,332 VLAP in 2017, and acquired ToT to produce further VLAP shells domestically. It can also fire laser-homing, satellite-guided, and top-attack projectiles. These guided shells are cheaper than the guided rockets in Pakistan's inventory. Finally, it can also reportedly fire nuclear artillery. The SH-15's chassis reportedly performs well off-road, but not in more demanding terrain.

Amidst the 2025 India-Pakistan crisis, the Pakistan Army deployed its SH-15s along the international border with India and the Line of Control in Pakistani Administrative Kashmir. After the outbreak of the 2025 India-Pakistan conflict, the SH-15s were reportedly used in combat missions against Indian military targets along the LoC which included logistic bases, artillery positions and checkpoints. By late 2026, Pakistan had deployed over 250 SH-15 units close to the Indian border. They are equipped with VLAP shells for long range strikes upto 72km.

== Variants ==
PCL-181
PLA designation
SH-15
Export designation

== Operators ==
In China's PLAGF, each group army commands one artillery brigade which doctrinally includes two self-propelled or towed artillery (122 mm, 152 mm, or 155 mm) battalions, each of which comprises three batteries of four to six howitzers each.

=== Current operators ===
- People's Republic of China
  - People's Liberation Army Ground Force: 600 units as of 2024.
    - 71st Artillery Brigade, 71st Group Army
    - 72nd Artillery Brigade(Stationed in Wuxi) - 72nd Group Army
    - 73rd Artillery Brigade(Stationed in Nan'an) - 73rd Group Army
    - 74th Artillery Brigade(Stationed in Shaoguan) - 74th Group Army
    - 75th Artillery Brigade - 75th Group Army
    - 77th Artillery Brigade - 77th Group Army
    - 80th Artillery Brigade(Stationed in Weifang) - 80th Group Army
    - 83rd Artillery Brigade - 83rd Group Army
- Pakistan
  - Pakistan Army
    - Pakistan Army Artillery Corps - 300 in service as of 2025. A total of 200-300 more planned to be purchased.
- Ethiopia
  - Ethiopian Ground Forces: Satellite imagery confirms the arrival of at least 32 SH-15 self-propelled howitzers.
- Myanmar
  - Myanmar Army: 150

== See also ==
- Archer – (Sweden)
- ATMOS 2000 – (Israel)
- A-222 Bereg – (Russia)
- 2S22 Bohdana – (Ukraine)
- CAESAR – (France)
- 152 mm SpGH DANA – (Czechoslovakia)
- G6 howitzer – (South Africa)
- ATAGS – (India)
- Dhanush (howitzer) – (India)
- AHS Kryl – (Poland)
- Nora B-52 – (Serbia)
- PCL-09 – (China)
- PCL-161 – (China)
- PLL-09 – (China)
- 155 mm SpGH Zuzana – (Slovakia)
- Type 19 155 mm wheeled self-propelled howitzer – (Japan)
