= ATMOS 2000 =

Israeli 155 mm self-propelled howitzer

ATMOS
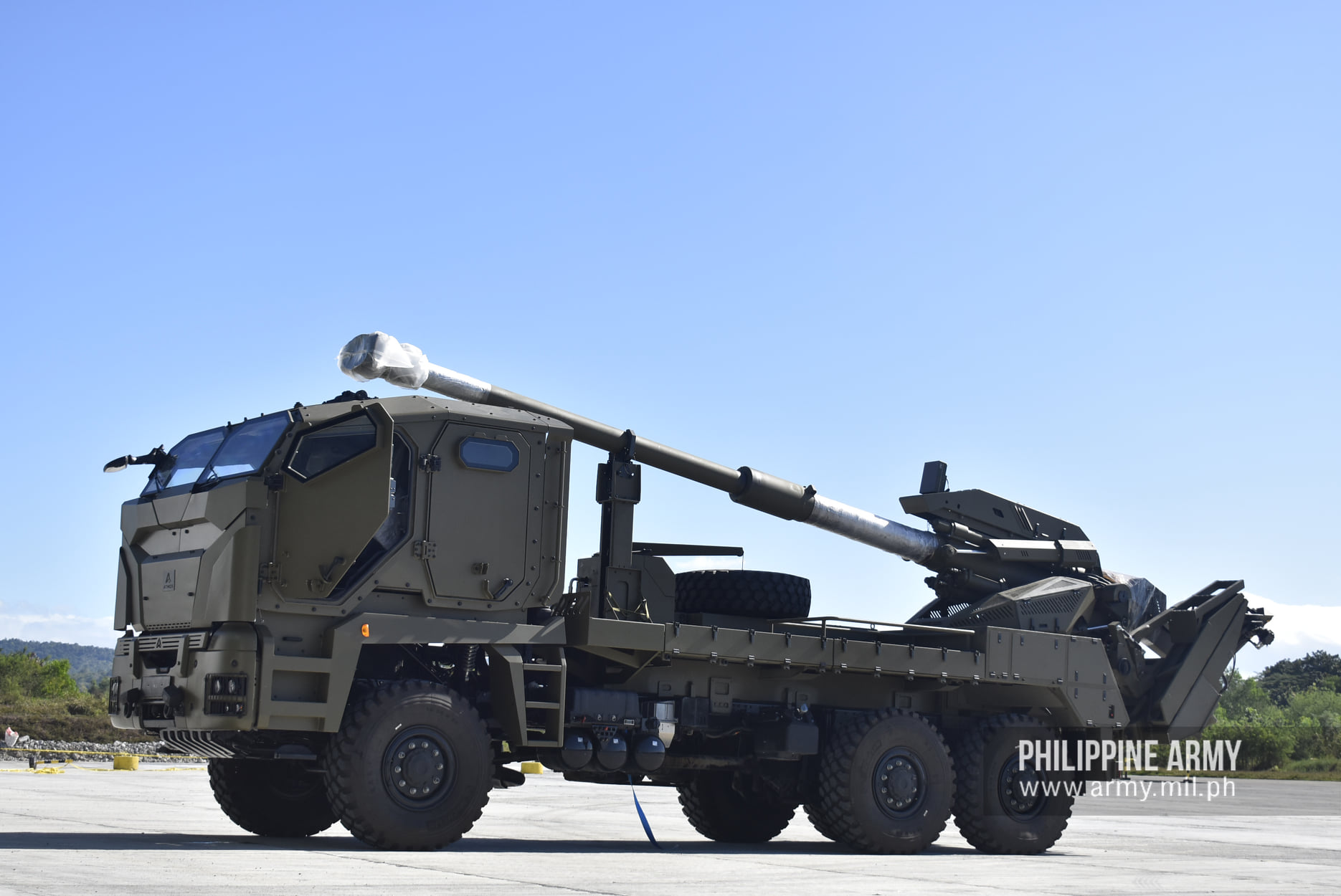
- An ATMOS system in service
- Type: Self-propelled howitzer
- Place of origin: Israel

Service history
- In service: 2001
- Wars: 2020 Nagorno-Karabakh conflict 2025 Cambodian–Thai clashes

Production history
- Manufacturer: Soltam Systems (now Elbit Systems)

Specifications
- Crew: 2 to 6
- Caliber: 155 mm (6.1 in)
- Maximum firing range: >40 km (25 mi) with ERFB-BB

ATMOS (Autonomous Truck Mounted howitzer System) is a 155 mm/52 calibre self-propelled gun system manufactured by Israeli military manufacturer Soltam Systems.

The system is a long ranged, fast moving, truck mounted with high firepower and mobility, rapid deployment, short response time, operable in all terrain areas. The system is integrated with a fully computerized system, providing an automatic control, accurate navigation and target acquisition, the system is offered with various gun barrel lengths, ranging from 39 up to 52 calibre, in order to meet different customer requirements.

== Overview ==
ATMOS is fitted with a 155 mm/52 calibre ordnance which conforms to NATO Joint Ballistic Memorandum of Understanding (JBMoU), and is mounted on a 6 × 6 cross-country truck chassis. The breech mechanism is horizontal sliding which automatically opens to the right with a self-sealing metal obturating ring. The buffer is a hydraulic cylinder with a hydro-pneumatic recuperator, and the recoil length is variable from 850 to 1,100 mm. Two pneumatic equilibrators balance the barrel, weapon elevation and traverse are all hydraulic and computer controlled. The gun's aiming gears, load assist systems and spades are operated by a hydraulic power pack. With a 155 mm/52 barrel, a 41 km (25 mi) maximum range can be achieved, using Extended Range Full-Bore - Base Bleed (ERFB-BB) projectile, 30 km (19 mi) firing the NATO L15 High Explosive (HE) projectile and 24.5 km (15.2 mi) firing the older M107 HE projectile.

ATMOS carries a total of 27 155 mm projectiles and associated charges and can be operated by a 4-man crew, consisting of two loaders positioned on either side at the rear. The system provides a rate of fire of between 4 and 9 rds/min.

== Development ==
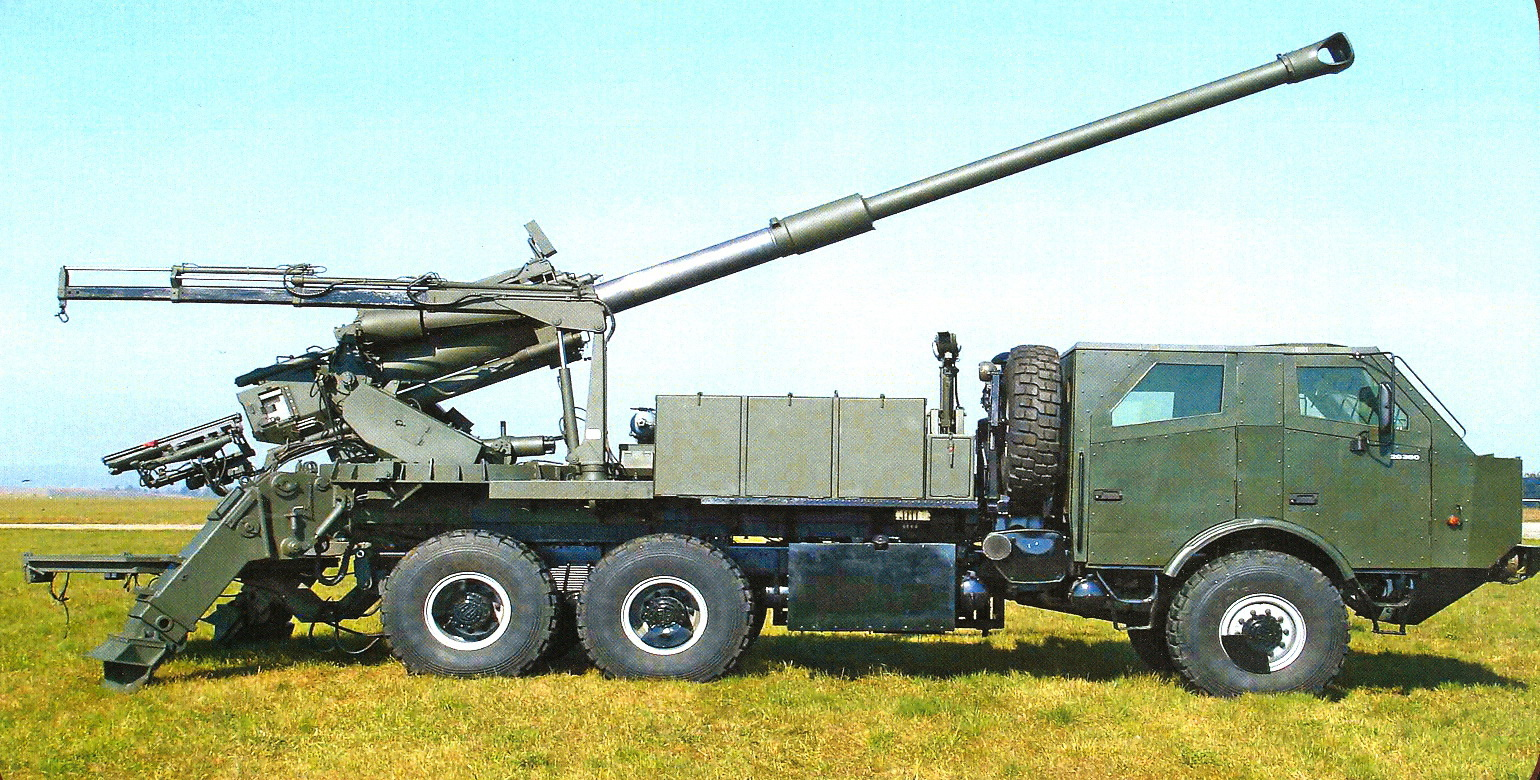
52 calibre ATROM system

Late in 2001, Soltam Systems released details of the latest version of its ATMOS whose existence was first revealed late in 1999. At that time, it was also referred to as the 155 mm Self-Propelled Wheeled Gun (SPWG). The ATMOS was developed as a private venture and is aimed mainly for export markets, although it has already been demonstrated to the Israel Defense Forces (IDF). Wheeled self-propelled guns are usually cheaper to procure than their more common tracked counterparts, have lower life cycle costs and are easier to operate and maintain. In addition, they also have greater strategic mobility and do not rely on Heavy Equipment Transporters (HETs). By late 2001, the system fired over 1,000 rounds, during extensive trials in Israel.

In mid-2003, an undisclosed export customer had placed a contract with the company worth USD5 million for an undisclosed batch of ATMOS systems. From late 2004 the Israel Defense Forces (IDF) carried out extensive field tests the ATMOS 155 mm/39 calibre system.

== Variants ==
- ATROM – Romanian version that uses the same Soltam M-17 155 mm gun on a locally developed ROMAN 26.360 DFAEG 6x6 truck chassis. The system never entered production and the project was put on hold after three prototypes were built.
- AHS Kryl – Polish version on a Jelcz 663 armoured 6×6 chassis and integrating WB Electronics "Topaz" artillery fire control system. Production was planned for 2021, but never started.
- M758 ATMG - Thai version on a Tatra armoured 6×6 chassis jointly developed by Soltam and DTI. 24 systems were in service as of 2023.

== Operators ==
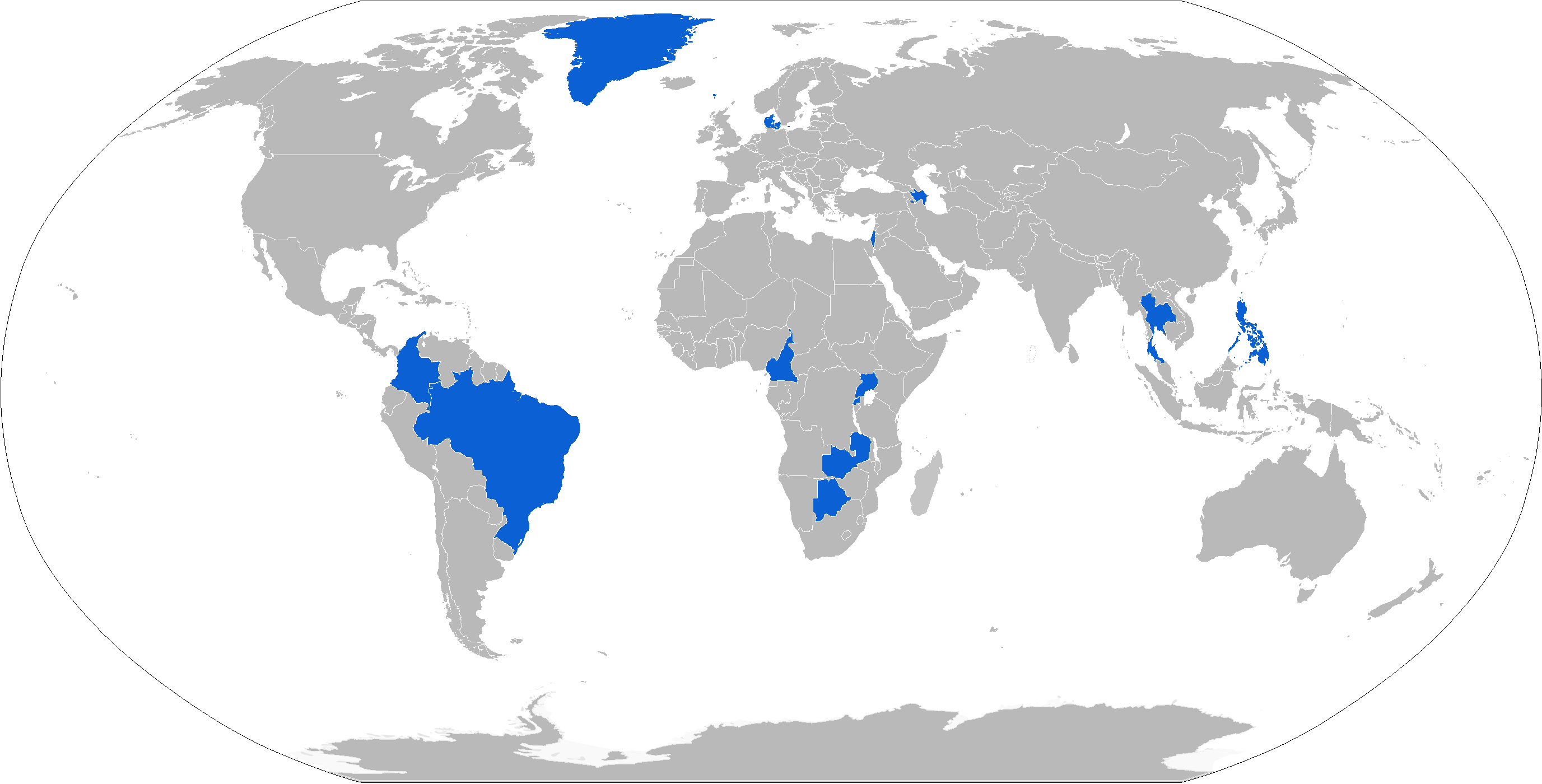
Map of ATMOS operators in blue

=== Current operators ===
Albania

- Albanian army Unknown amount

Azerbaijan

- Azerbaijani Army: 6 systems

Botswana

- Botswana Defence Force: 5 systems in 2018

Cameroon

- Cameroonian Army: 18 systems

Denmark

- Royal Danish Army: 1 system - 18 systems under construction. To replace the 19 ordered units of French produced CAESAR 8x8 howitzers that has been pledged to the Ukrainian armed forces.

Moldova

- Moldovan Armed Forces: at least one battery in use (4 firing units and support vehicles), might be more on order.

Philippines

- Philippine Army: 12 systems + 12 additional systems on order

Thailand

- Royal Thai Army: M758 ATMG - 24 systems + 6 systems on order
- Royal Thai Marine Corps: M758 ATMG - 6 systems + 6 systems on order

Rwanda

- Rwandan Defence Force: at least 5 ATMOS systems

Uganda

- UPDF Land Forces: 6 systems

Zambia

- Zambian Army: 6 systems

=== Future operators ===
Brazil

- ATMOS was selected by the Brazilian Army in April 2024 for the acquisition of 36 systems.

Colombia

- Colombian Army: The Colombian Army will acquire 18 units of the self-propelled howitzer developed by the Elbit Systems.

Morocco

- Morocco chose to buy 36 units following technical difficulties with French CAESAR systems

=== Potential operators ===
Romania

- Of the five self-propelled artillery battalions, three are to be tracked and two are to be wheeled. According to Gen. Incicaș, the chief of the General Directorate for Armaments, the wheeled battalions are intended for the Vânători de munte, while the tracked battalions are intended for the heavy infantry units and the 282nd Armored Brigade. As of 2023, Elbit Systems is confirmed to participate with the ATMOS system in the contract bid.

Bulgaria

- ATMOS is one of the favourites to win The Bulgarian Ministry of Defence's contract for new 155 mm Self-propelled howitzer.

=== Evaluation only ===
Poland

- The Polish Land Forces planned but never ordered the AHS Kryl 155mm Howitzer, a domestically made version of the ATMOS

Romania

- ATROM variant prototypes only, the system never entered production.

United States

- The US Army is interested in a more mobile artillery platforms. Some "Mobile Howitzer Trials and Shoot-Off" had been occurring in 2021. The systems tested were the CAESAR, the ATMOS, the Archer and the Nora B-52. The Army was impressed by the Archer,also very positive with the CAESAR. But not much has filtered about potentially ordering one of these systems. As some M777 howitzers were donated to Ukraine, it is certainly possible that the Army would consider a truck mounted variant to compensate as a gap filler to cover the donated howitzers. But ultimately decided to not move forward with the decision.

== See also ==
- SIGMA 155 – Israeli self-propelled howitzer of the same company and family
- Archer – Swedish self-propelled howitzer
- A-222E Bereg-E 130mm coastal mobile artillery system – Russian self-propelled coastal defense gun
- 2S22 Bohdana – Ukrainian 155 mm self-propelled howitzer
- CAESAR self-propelled howitzer – French 155 mm artillery
- DANA – Czechoslovak self-propelled howitzer
- G6 Rhino – South African 155 mm self-propelled artillery
- Nora B-52 – Serbian 155 mm self-propelled howitzer
- PCL-181 – Chinese 155mm self-propelled howitzer
- PLL-09 – Chinese amphibious wheeled armoured fighting vehicle family
- Type 19 155 mm wheeled self-propelled howitzer – Japanese artillery
- 155mm SpGH ZUZANA – Slovak 155mm self-propelled gun-howitzer
- MaRG 155-BR – Mounted Gun System
