= Type 19 155 mm wheeled self-propelled howitzer =

Japanese artillery

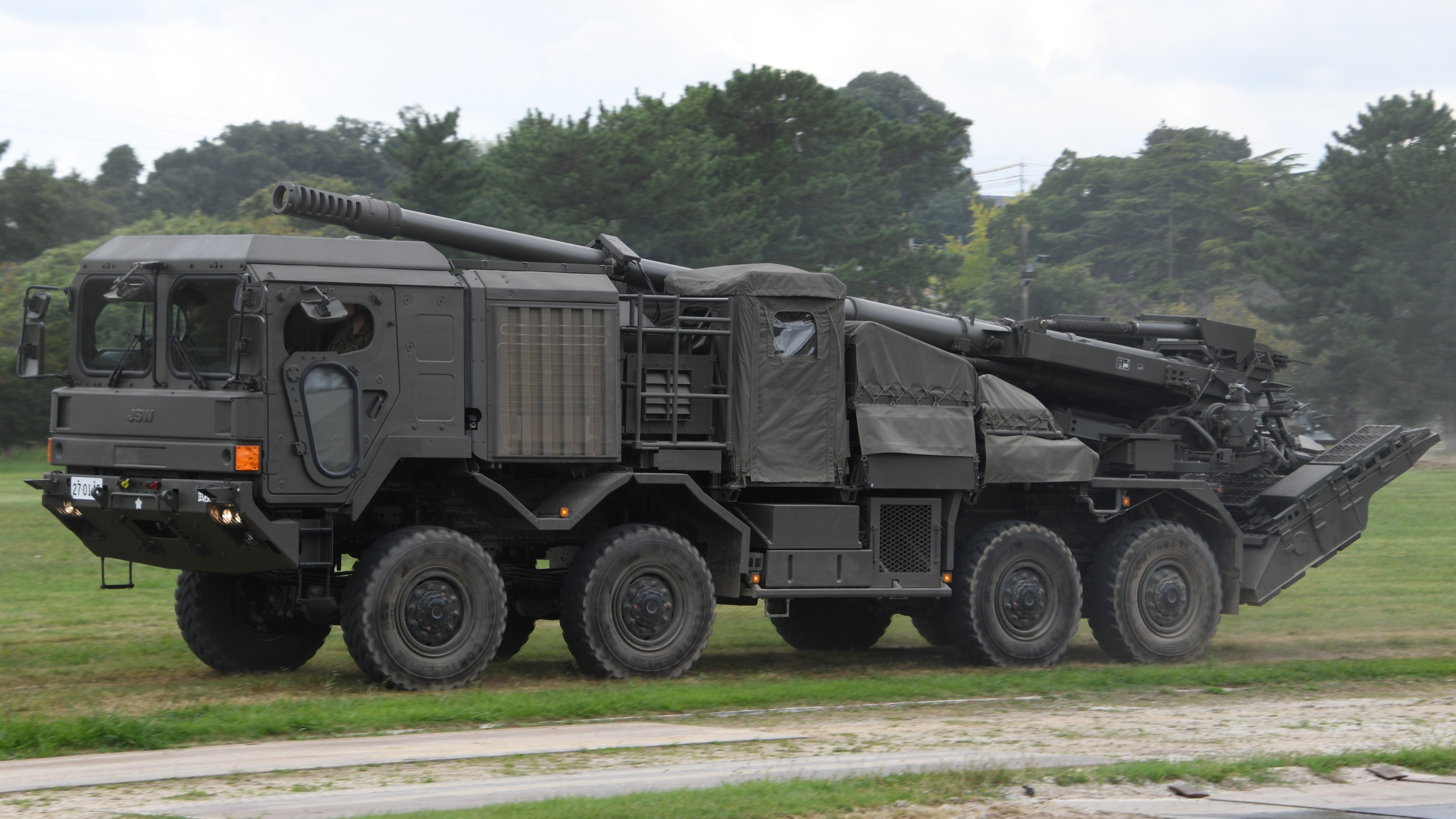
- A Type 19 155 mm self-propelled howitzer in service
- Type: Self-propelled howitzer
- Place of origin: Japan

Service history
- In service: 2020–…
- Used by: Japan

Production history
- Designer: Acquisition, Technology & Logistics Agency
- Designed: 2013–2018
- Manufacturer: Japan Steel Works
- Unit cost: see Operators
- Produced: 2019–…
- No. built: 70 (2026)

Specifications
- Mass: 25.0 t (55,100 lb)
- Length: 11.21 m (36.8 ft)
- Width: 2.50 m (8.2 ft)
- Height: 3.40 m (11.2 ft)
- Crew: 5 (driver, gunner, commander, 2 loaders)
- Caliber: 155 mm
- Breech: interrupted screw
- Rate of fire: 6 rpm
- Effective firing range: 30 km (19 mi) (standard); 40 km (25 mi) (base bleed)
- Main armament: 155 mm/L52 howitzer gun
- Engine: MAN D2066; 440 hp (330 kW) (1900 rpm)
- Power/weight: 17.6 hp/t (13.1 kW/t)
- Transmission: ZF 12 AS 23010D AS-Tronic (AMT) (12 front/ 2 rear); MAN G172 transfer case (high/low range) with engageable front axles
- Operational range: 800 km (500 mi)
- Maximum speed: 90 km/h (56 mph)

The Type 19 155 mm wheeled self-propelled howitzer (19式装輪自走155mmりゅう弾砲, Hitokyuu-shiki-sourin-jisou-155mm-ryuudan-hou) is a Japanese wheeled 155 mm self-propelled howitzer. The vehicle is designed to replace Japan's inventory of FH70 towed howitzers. The Type 19 continues to serve exclusively in the Japan Ground Self-Defense Force as a more affordable counterpart of the Type 99 155 mm self-propelled howitzer.

== Development ==
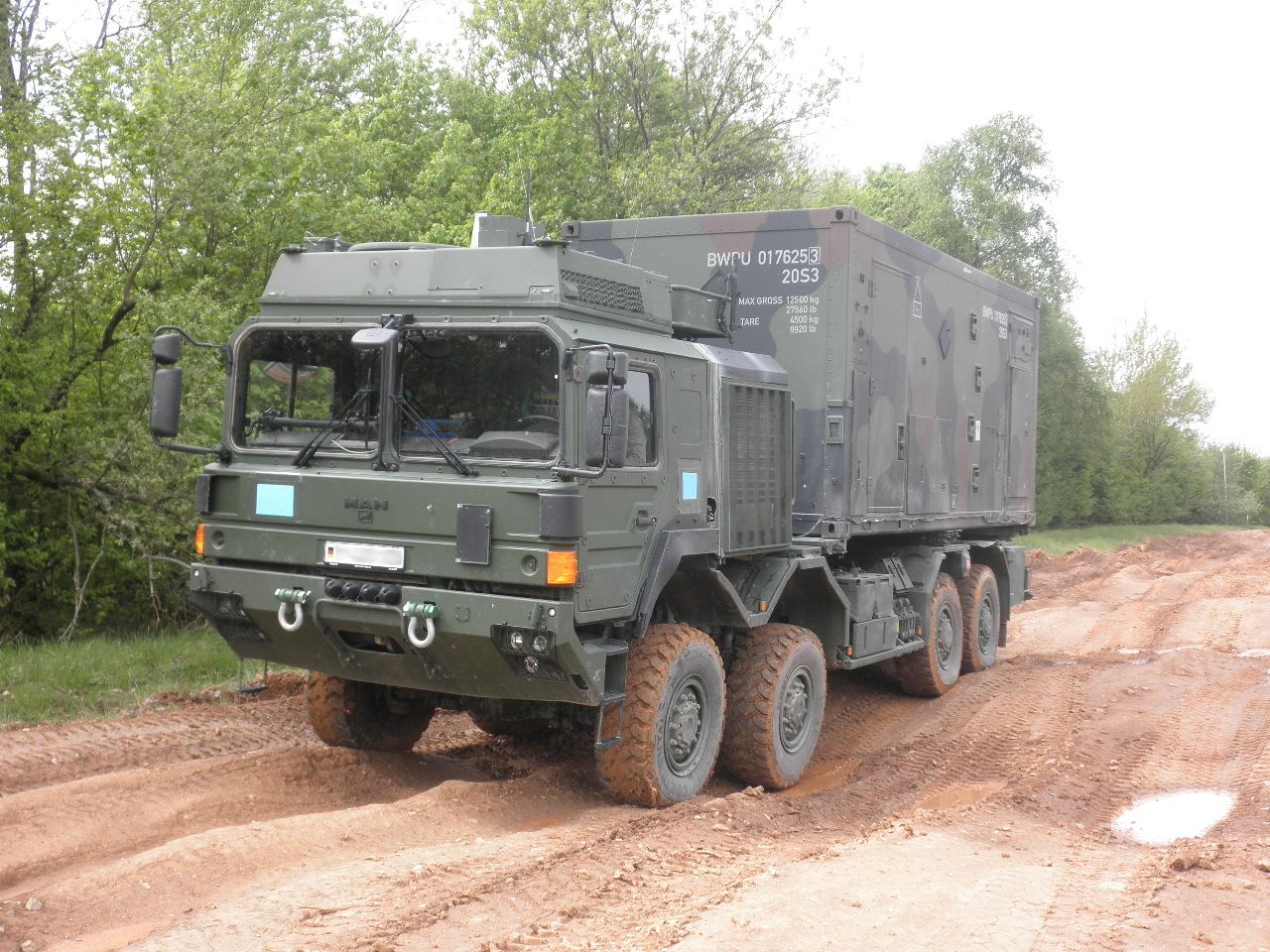
The Type 19 155 mm self-propelled howitzer uses Rheinmetall MAN Military Vehicles' HX44M chassis from the company's HX range of tactical trucks.

In 2011, the Japanese Ministry of Defence evaluated a proposal to develop a vehicle capable of networking with other systems and performing shoot-and-scoot tactics to replace the FH70 towed 155 mm howitzer. The evaluation concluded in 2012 and the ministry requested 6.4 billion yen to be invested into the development of the vehicle in the fiscal year (FY) 2012 defence budget. The initial request was declined, only to be approved the following year. Research and development funds for the 155 mm wheeled howitzer were granted in the FY 2013 defence budget, although the budget was lowered to 1.4 billion yen. That marks the official beginning for the development of the Type 19 155 mm self-propelled howitzer.

The new self-propelled howitzer was to make use of off-the-shelf technologies. To reduce development costs, the initial plan was to mount the howitzer gun from the Type 99 155 mm self-propelled howitzer on a heavy recovery vehicle chassis. As the limitations of that option became clear during development and Japan had no other suitable chassis available – developing a proprietary chassis was deemed financially unfeasible –, an existing foreign 8×8 chassis was chosen instead. Rheinmetall MAN Military Vehicles' HX44M became the chassis of the Type 19, which was produced under licence by Japan Steel Works.

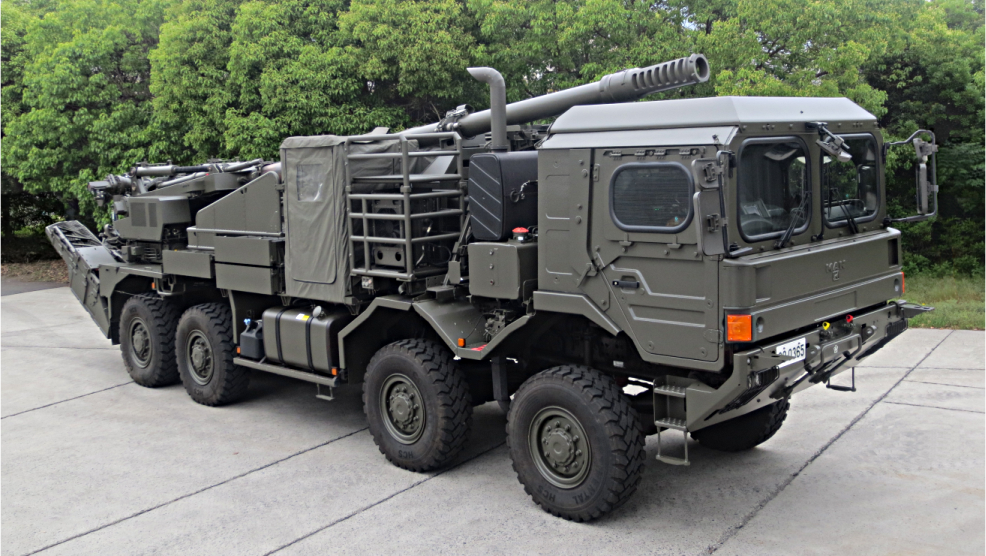
Type 19 155 mm self-propelled howitzer prototype

On 31 May 2018, the Acquisition, Technology & Logistics Agency (ATLA) received 5 prototypes from Japan Steel Works for testing and evaluation. Testing concluded in 2019, when the Type 19 155 mm wheeled self-propelled howitzer was accepted into Japan Ground Self-Defense Force Service. Seven wheeled howitzers were procured for training purpose in the FY 2019 defence budget for a total of 5.1 billion yen.

The artillery was officially unveiled to the public in 2019 during exercises in the East Fuji Manoeuvre Area.

== Design ==
=== Chassis ===
The Type 19 155 mm self-propelled howitzer uses Rheinmetall MAN Military Vehicles' HX44M 8×8 chassis from the company's HX2 series of tactical military trucks. Japan Steel Works produces the chassis under licence domestically.

The air-conditioned front cabin has seats for three crew members. Two other crew members are seated at the middle of the truck, one on either side of the gun, in a small open compartment designed for their transport. The howitzer gun is mounted to the rear of the vehicle, which is equipped with a spade to absorb recoil from the gun.

=== Gun ===
The howitzer gun is a modified version of the 155 mm 52-calibre gun used on the Type 99 155 mm self-propelled howitzer. As the gun is externally mounted, it was modified to remove the smoke extractor of the propellant gasses (present on the Type 99).

Unlike the Type 99 that has an automatic loader for both shells and propellant charges, the Type 19 is equipped with an automatic loader only for the shells. Propellant charges are loaded manually by the crew. This is also the reason why the Type 19 has an additional loader when compared to the Type 99.

The elevation and traverse angles of the gun have not been revealed publicly. With the aid of its rear spade, the Type 19 is reportedly able to traverse and shoot its gun almost sideways.

=== Fire control system ===
The Type 19 features a highly automated fire control system, which is linked to the Fire Combat Command and Control System. Targeting is conducted via a tablet, where the gunner inputs the target location obtained from the command and control system.

The self-propelled howitzer is equipped with both GPS and INS (Safran Sigma 30) systems. Backup targeting devices include optical sights in case of a system failure.

=== Ammunition ===
The Type 19 uses the same shells and propellant charges as the Type 99. Having the same howitzer gun also implies that the effective firing range is very similar – 30 km (19 mi) using standard shells and 40 km (25 mi) when using base bleed shells. In September 2024, Japan placed an order for Leonardo's guided long-range Vulcano 155 GLR shells, received the first batch in December, and began the integration process into the Type 19.

Among the shells used on the Type 19 are:

- HE shell:
  - Range: ≤ 30 km (19 mi)
- Type 93 base bleed shell:
  - Range: ≤ 40 km (25 mi)
- Vulcano GLR:
  - Range: ≤ 70 km (43 mi)
  - Guidance: autonomous IMU + GPS
  - Combined with a quadcopter drone for targeting in Japan Ground Self-Defense Force service.

== Operational history ==
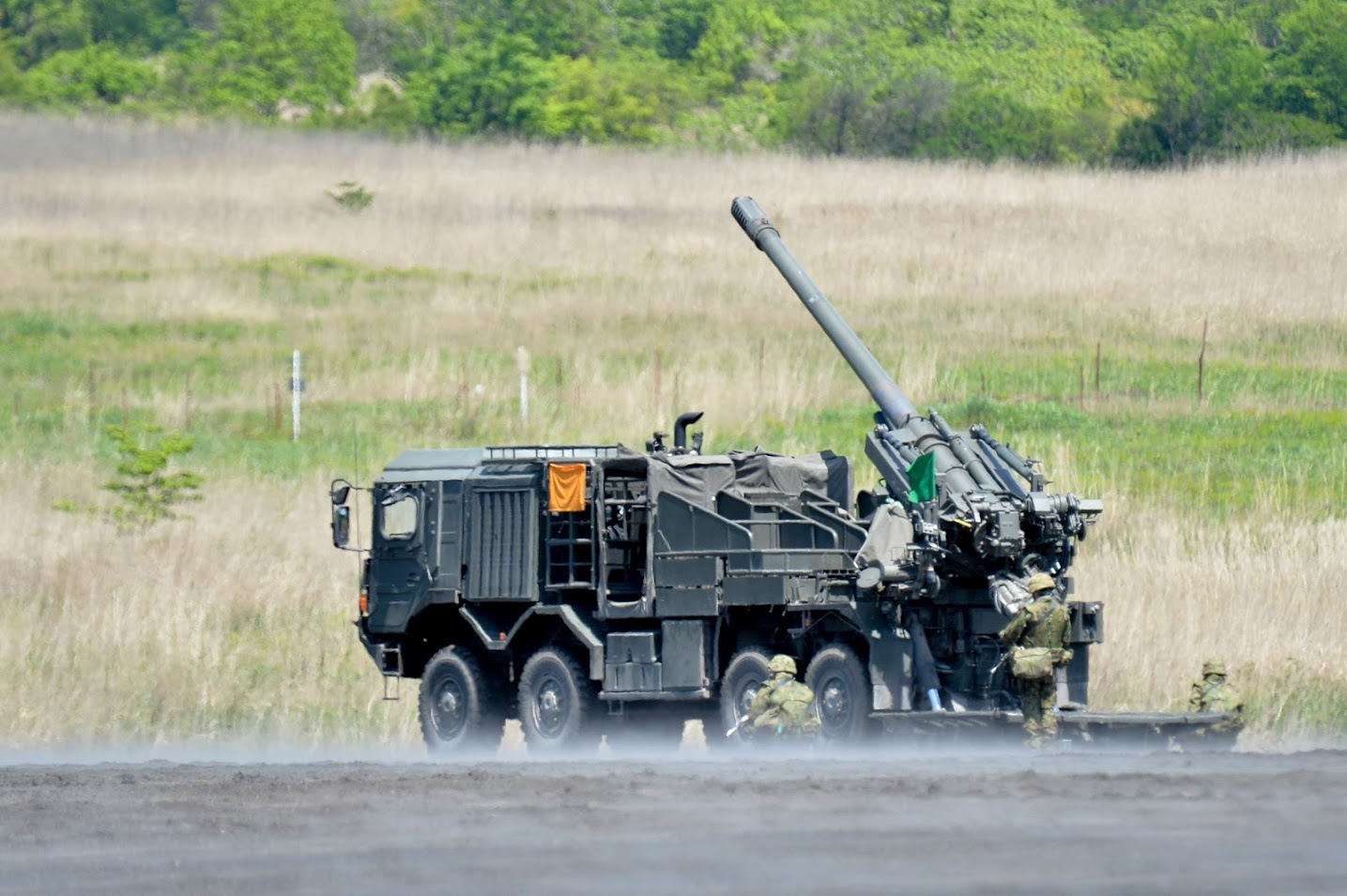
A Type 19 in firing position during live fire exercises held in the East Fuji Maneuver Area in 2020.

Procurement of the Type 19 155 mm self-propelled howitzer started in 2019. Prototypes were first revealed to the public in 2019 during the annual live fire exercises held at the East Fuji Maneuver Area. The first production vehicle belonging to an artillery training unit appeared a year later during the 2020 live fire exercises. Type 19s are expected to arm units that operate the FH70 towed howitzer, as the latter are gradually phased out of service.

In 2025, the Japan Ground Self-Defense Force tested long-range shells and propellant charges for the Type 19 in the Yuma Proving Ground. It was not possible to test the long-range ammunition in Japan. For the same reason, Japan is going to dispatch Type 19s to the United Kingdom for testing Vulcano GLR shells in QinetiQ's MOD Aberporth testing range.

== Operators ==
=== Current operators ===
Japan (70 ordered as of 2025)

This is the list of orders with each fiscal year:

Fiscal year	Budget (¥ billion)	Quantity	Notes
Total planned	–	227	
2027	¥ 0.0	–	
2026	¥ 0.0	–	
2025	¥ 14.0	14	
2024	¥ 14.9	16	
2023	¥ 9.8	12	
2022	¥ 4.4	7	
2021	¥ 4.5	7	
2020	¥ 4.5	7	
2019	¥ 8.1	7	
Total	¥ 60.2	70	–

Targeted number of vehicles
Budget request

== Similar vehicles ==
- 2S22 Bohdana – (Ukraine)
- 2S43 Malva – (Russia)
- AHS Kryl – (Poland)
- ATMOS 2000 – (Israel)
- Archer – (Sweden)
- CAESAR – (France)
- EVA – (Slovakia)
- Nora B-52 – (Serbia)
- PCL-181 – (China)
- Zuzana 2 – (Slovakia)
