= A-222 Bereg (artillery system) =

Russian self-propelled coastal defense gun

A-222
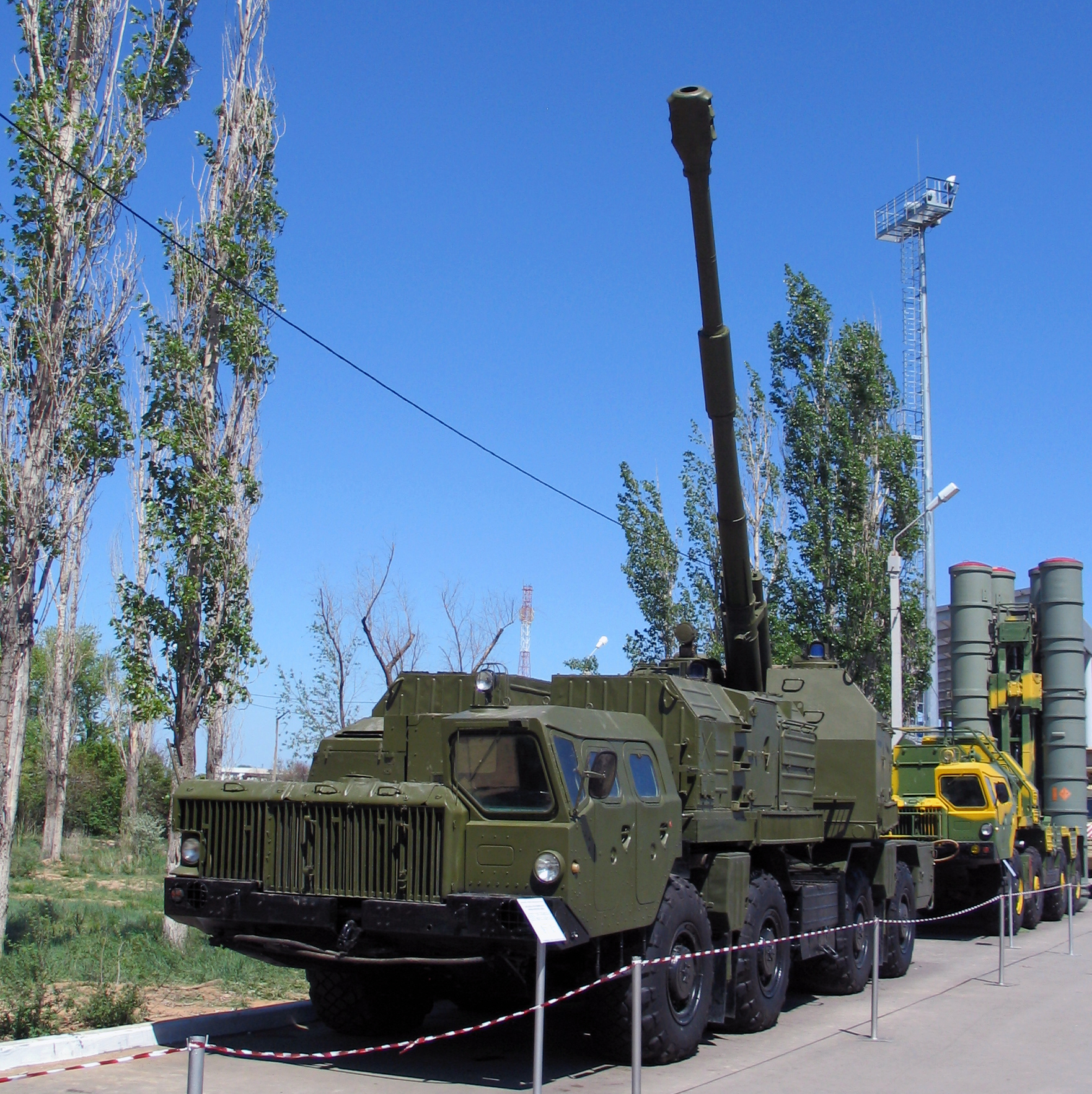
- A-222 at a military exhibition on the Kapustin Yar missile range
- Type: Self-propelled coastal defense gun
- Place of origin: Russia

Service history
- In service: 1988–present
- Used by: Russian Navy

Production history
- Manufacturer: NPO Barrikady

Specifications
- Caliber: 130 mm (5.1 in)
- Elevation: -5° to 50°
- Rate of fire: 10-12
- Maximum firing range: 22–23 km (14–14 mi)
- Main armament: 130 mm A-222 (40 rounds)
- Engine: D12A-525A diesel 525 hp
- Operational range: 650 km (road)
- Maximum speed: 60 km/h

The A-222 Bereg is a 130 mm self-propelled coastal artillery gun developed by the Soviet Union. It entered service with the Russian Navy.

== Design ==
The A-222 gun is a variant of the AK-130 naval gun. It uses the same ammunition and has the same ballistics. The gun is mounted on an eight-wheel drive MAZ-543M truck.

The battery includes command and generator vehicles, and radar with a range of 35 kilometers.

== History ==
According to Norman Friedman, development started in December 1976, and battery underwent government trials from November 1992 to May 1993; the battery was then seized by Ukraine. According to Adam Świerkowski, development started in the 1980s and the system entered service in 1988.

The system was exhibited in Abu Dhabi in 1993, but there were no export orders.

== Operators ==
- Russia
  - Coastal Troops of the Russian Navy: 36 as of 2024. All deployed by the 11th Independent Coastal Missile-Artillery Brigade. Reportedly in service with the Dnieper River Flotilla in 2025.

== Comparable weapons ==
- 152 mm SpGH DANA – Czechoslovak self-propelled howitzer
- 155 mm SpGH Zuzana – Slovak 155mm self-propelled gun-howitzer
- Nora B-52 – Serbian 155 mm self-propelled howitzer
- PLL-09 – Chinese amphibious wheeled armoured fighting vehicle family
- Type 19 155 mm wheeled self-propelled howitzer – Japanese artillery

== Sources ==
- Friedman, Norman (1997). The Naval Institute Guide to World Naval Weapons Systems, 1997-1998. Naval Institute Press. ISBN 1-55750-268-4.
- International Institute for Strategic Studies (2025). The Military Balance 2025. Routledge. ISBN 978-1-041-04967-8.
