= PCL-161 =

Chinese 122 mm self-propelled howitzer

- Type: Self-propelled howitzer
- Place of origin: China

Service history
- In service: 2020–present
- Used by: People's Liberation Army

Specifications
- Mass: 12–13 tonnes (12–13 long tons; 13–14 short tons)
- Caliber: 122 mm (4.8 in)
- Rate of fire: 8 rounds/min
- Effective firing range: 22 km (14 mi) (conventional projectile)
- Maximum firing range: 30 km (19 mi) (rocket-assisted projectile)
- Main armament: 122 mm howitzer gun
- Drive: 4×4
- Suspension: hydropneumatic suspension

The PCL-161 is a truck-mounted 122 mm (4.8 in) self-propelled howitzer used by the Chinese People's Liberation Army Ground Force. The designation "PCL" is an acronym derived from pinyin (Chinese: 炮车榴弹炮; pinyin: Pào Chē Liúdànpào; lit. 'Gun Vehicle Howitzer').

== Development ==
The PCL-161 was first unveiled while doing exercises in the Tibet Autonomous Region in October 2020. It is speculated to be a successor of the 122 mm truck-mounted howitzer PCL-09.

== Design ==
PCL-161 features a 122 mm howitzer with semi-automatic loader and digital fire-control system. The range is 22 km (14 mi) with conventional ammunition and 30 km (19 mi) with rocket-assisted projectiles. It features various improvements over the PCL-09, including better firing accuracy, and the ability to fire directly in the forward direction of the vehicle. The PCL-161 features a semi-automatic loading system that is identical to the one found on the PCL-181, where the operator places the shell on the loading arm and the loading arm loads the round into the breech. The fire-control system is also identical to that of the PCL-181, featuring automatic calculation and gun-laying via the vehicle-mounted fire-control computer.

The truck chassis is based on the FAW MV3 series of tactical trucks, specifically the 4×4 CTM-133 variant. During combat, two front vertical stabilizers and two rear stabilizers are extended and dug into the ground to dampen the recoil. PCL-161 is fitted with hydropneumatic suspension, allowing better gun elevation and depression.

== Operators ==
- China: People's Liberation Army Ground Force – 60 units as of 2022.
