= PCL-09 =

Chinese 122 mm self-propelled howitzer

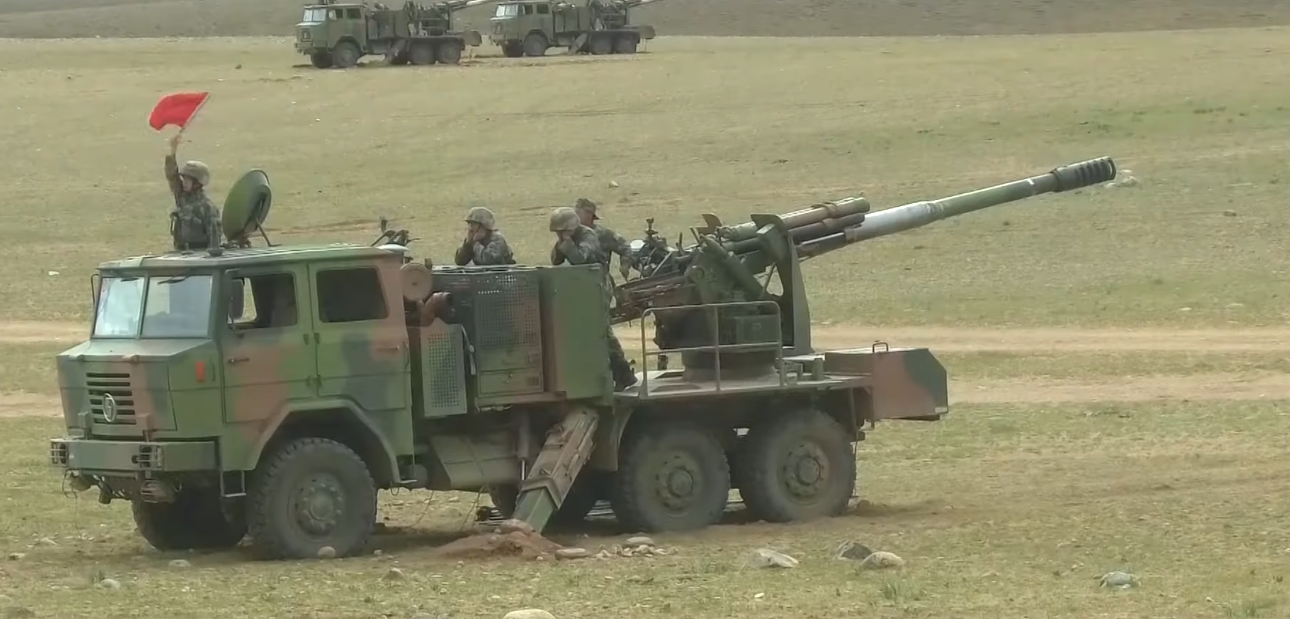
- Type: Self-propelled howitzer
- Place of origin: China

Service history
- In service: 2009–present
- Used by: See § Operators

Production history
- Manufacturer: Norinco

Specifications
- Mass: 16.5 t (16.2 long tons; 18.2 short tons)
- Crew: 5
- Caliber: 122 mm (4.8 in)
- Rate of fire: 6–8 rounds/min
- Effective firing range: 22 km (14 mi) (conventional projectile)
- Maximum firing range: 27 km (17 mi) (rocket-assisted projectile)
- Drive: 6×6
- Operational range: 600 km (370 mi)
- Maximum speed: 85 km/h (53 mph)

The PCL-09, exported as CS/SH1, is a Chinese truck-mounted howitzer developed by Norinco for use by the People's Liberation Army Ground Force. It was first commissioned in 2009 with a 122 mm gun-howitzer with an effective range of 27 km (17 mi) and a rate of fire of 6–8 rounds per minute. Mounted on a Shaanxi SX2150 6×6 military truck, it is also equipped with the satellite navigation system BeiDou. It was used for the first time during a military exercise of the Shanghai Cooperation Organisation in 2010.

== Operators ==
Cambodia

- Royal Cambodian Army: 30 SH-1s

People's Republic of China

- People's Liberation Army Ground Force: 300 units as of 2022.

Rwanda

- Rwanda Defence Force: 6 units as of 2022.

== See also ==
- PCL-161 – the successor of PCL-09
