= 2nd Mechanized Brigade (Slovakia) =

- 2. mechanizovaná brigáda
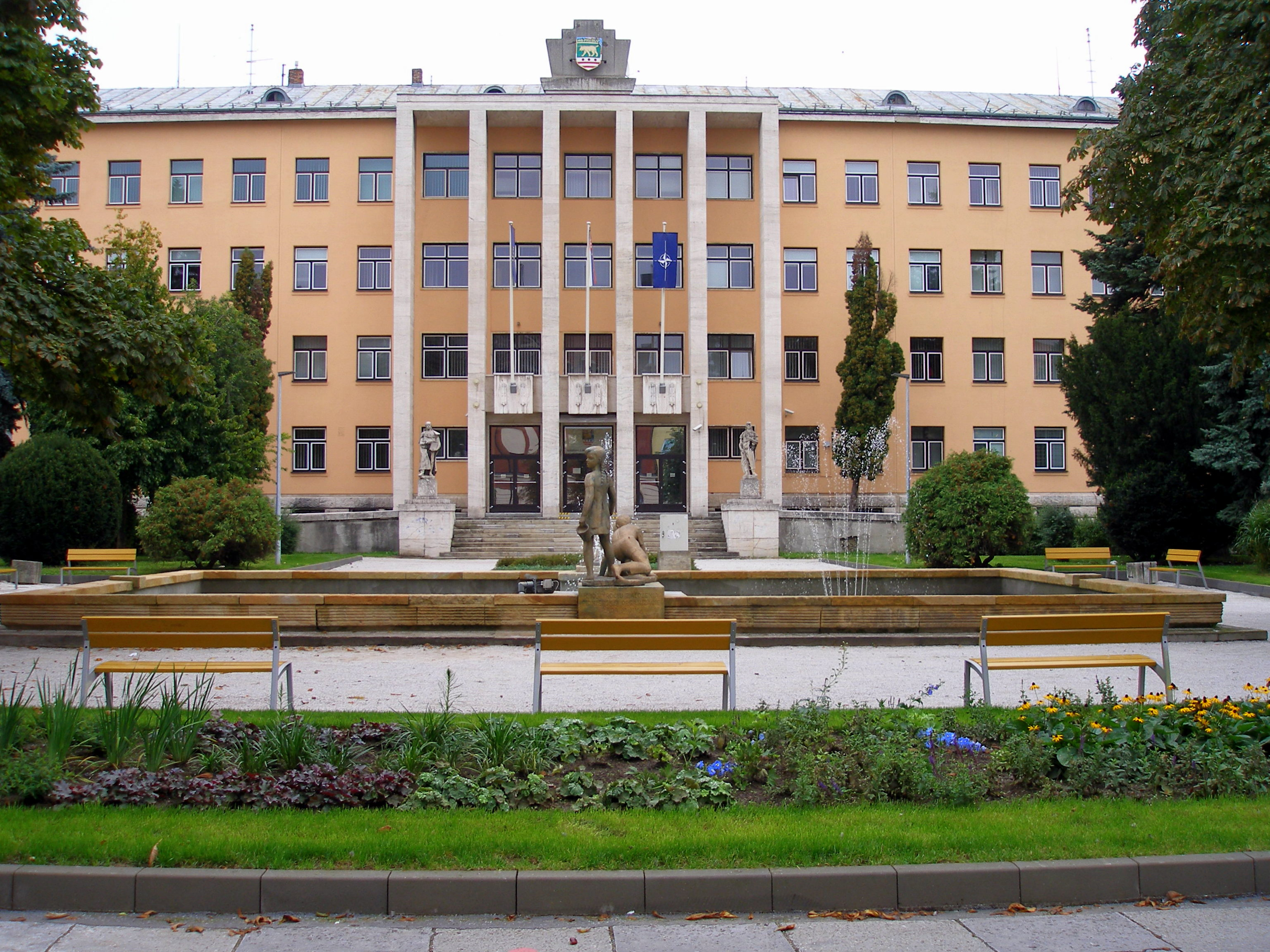
- Palace of Justice in Prešov, headquarters building of the 2nd Mechanized Brigade
- Active: 2000–present
- Country: Slovakia
- Allegiance: Slovak Armed Forces
- Type: Mechanized brigade
- Role: Operational, territorial and tactical activities
- Part of: Slovak Armed Forces Headquarters
- Garrison/HQ: Prešov
- Nickname(s): Prešov Mechanized Brigade
- Patron: Rudolf Viest
- Motto(s): Honor et munus / Česť a povinnosť ("Honour and Duty")

Commanders
- Current commander: 1 star general Slavomír Verčimák

The 2nd Mechanized Brigade of general Rudolf Viest is a subordinate component of the Ground Forces of the Slovak Republic. The headquarters of the 2nd Mechanized Brigade is located in Prešov.

== Main task ==
The main task of the 2nd Mechanized Brigade is to "participate in the tasks of defense and protection of vital interests of Slovak republic and its allies against military and non-military threats by conducting military and non-military operations. With regard to organizational structure and armament, the 2nd MechBde is designed to fulfill full spectrum operations against lightly armored enemy units in high battle rhythm."

== History ==
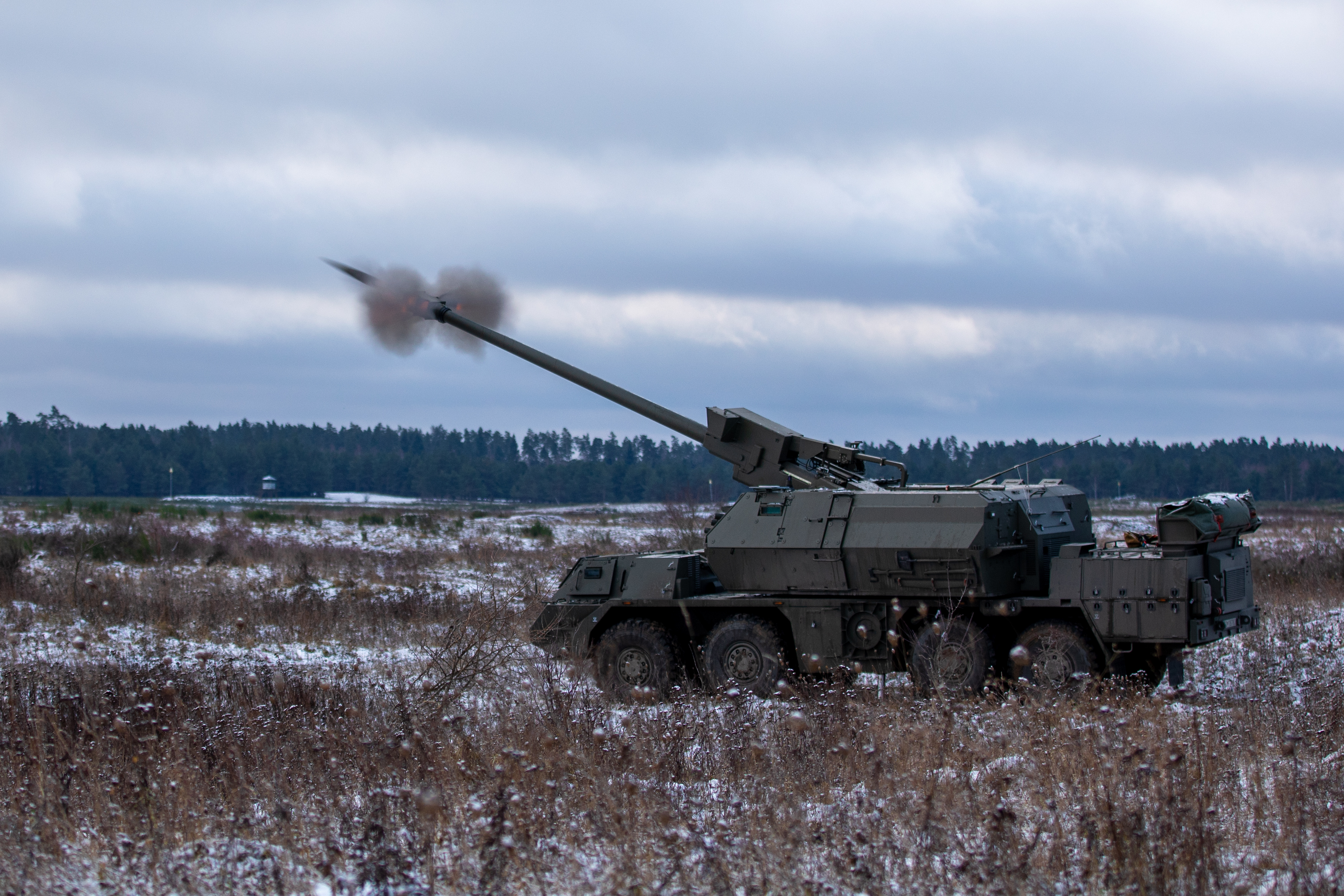
2nd Mechanized Brigade's Zuzana 2 155 mm howitzer fires a projectile during a US-Slovak live-fire exercise at Bemowo Piskie Training Area, Poland, November 30, 2021.

18 June 1945	creation of the 10th infantry division in Košice
1956–1966	18th motorised rifle division
1960	relocation from Košice to Prešov
1966–1990	reorganization into the 14th tank division
1991–1994	reorganization into the 14th mechanized division
1994–2000	reorganization into the 2nd army corps
1 April 2000	creation of HQ of the 1st mechanized brigade
1 October 2000	creation of the 1st mechanized brigade
1 October 2003	reorganization of the 1.mb to a mechanized brigade
1 October 2006	reorganization to a mechanized brigade
3 September 2007	received honorary title referring to General Rudolf Viest
1 October 2010	adoption of battle flag

== Commanders ==
1945–1948	Brigadier General Emil Perko
1948–1949	Brigadier General Ľudevít Sozanský
1949–1951	Brigadier General Ján Malár
1951–1955	Brigadier General Jaroslav Palička
1955–1956	Colonel Alexander Mucha
1956–1957	Lieutenant Colonel Peter Andrejčík
1957–1960	Colonel Josef Kudrnovský
1960–1964	Colonel Pavol Papač
1964–1967	unknown
1967–1972	Major General Zoltán Jakuš
1972–1974	Colonel Stanislav Weinlich
1974–1978	Major General Josef Einšpigl
1978–1982	Colonel Imrich Andrejčák
1982–1985	Major General František Radimský
1985–1987	Major General Jan Ščudlík
1987–1990	Colonel Marián Horský
1990–1991	Colonel Emil Vestenický
1991–1992	Major General Ján Čmilanský
1997–1999	Major General František Butko
2000–2002	Colonel Jaroslav Vývlek
2002–2005	Brigadier General Miroslav Kováč
2005–2006	Colonel Ján Salaganič
2006–2007	Brigadier General Štefan Mečár
2007–2010	Brigadier General Ondřej Novosad
2010–2012	Colonel Karol Navrátil
2012–2015	Colonel Martin Michalko
2015–present	Brigadier General Martin Stoklasa

== Organizational structure ==
- HQ of the 2nd Mechanized Brigade (Prešov)
- 21st Mixed Mechanized Battalion (Trebišov)
- 22nd Mechanized Battalion Mikuláš Markuš (Michalovce)
- Self-propelled artillery section (Michalovce)
- Battalion logistics support (Prešov)
- CIMIC and PSYOPS unit (Martin)
- Directly subordinate units

== Equipment and weapon systems ==
Small arms and portable artillery

- Pistol CZ 82
- Model 58 assault rifle
- Universal machine gun model 59
- Sniper rifle SVDN 1
- Sniper rifle AW-50
- Rocket-propelled grenade RPG-7
- OZ 9P135 M anti-tank missile launcher
- Mortar 81mm
- Mortar 82mm
- Mortar 98mm

Armoured fighting vehicles

- BVP/1 infantry fighting vehicle (Czechoslovak and Slovak variants)
- OT-90 infantry fighting vehicle (Czechoslovak and Slovak BMP variant) with 9M113 Konkurs anti-tank missile system
- T-72M1 main battle tank

Artillery vehicles

- Self-propelled gun howitzer ZUZANA

Utility and transport vehicles

- Off-road vehicle Land Rover Defender 110 (utility and patrol vehicle)
- Mercedes-Benz G-Class (utility and patrol vehicle)
- Off-road vehicle UAZ-469 B (utility and patrol vehicle, gradually decommissioned)
- Mercedes-Benz G-300 (military ambulance)
- Volkswagen Transporter (T4) (military ambulance)
- AKTIS 4x4 off-road transport vehicle (military transport truck)
- Tatra T-815 VVN heavy off-road transport (military transport truck)
- Tatra T-815-7 heavy off-road transport (military transport truck)
- Tatrapan T1 ZASA armoured personnel carrier / armoured truck (transport, logistics)
- Praga V3S off-road transport vehicle (military transport truck, gradually decommissioned)

Engineering and specialist vehicles

- Tatra T-815 Multilift container loader
- Crane vehicle AV-15
- Bridgelayer vehicles
- Božena 3 mine flail and de-mining equipment

Reconnaissance drone

- Innocon Microfalcon UAV

Portable radiolocator

- FLIR Ranger R20

== Insignia ==
The insignia of the 2nd mechanized Brigade and its individual battalions includes coat of arms style emblems for each of the major components. The 2nd Mechanized Brigade also has an honorary battle flag.

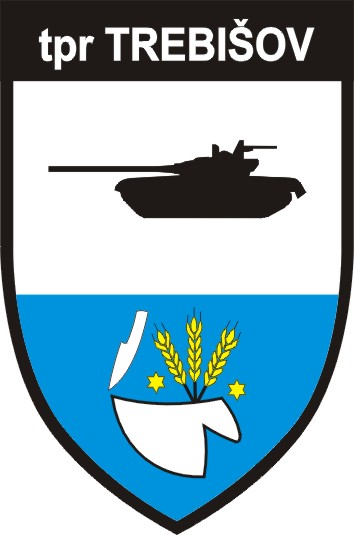
Tank Battalion (Trebišov)

22nd Mixed Mechanized Battalion (Michalovce)

== See also ==
- 1st Mechanized Brigade of the Slovak Ground Forces
