= BVP-M =

- A BVP-M of the Slovak Ground Forces
- Type: Infantry fighting vehicle
- Place of origin: Slovakia

Service history
- In service: 2018-present
- Used by: Slovakia

Production history
- Manufacturer: MSM Land Systems Division
- Developed from: BPzV Svatava
- Produced: 2018-2019
- No. built: 17

Specifications
- Mass: 15.3 tons
- Length: 6.735 meters
- Width: 3.46 meters
- Height: 2.83 meters
- Crew: 3
- Main armament: 30 mm 2A42 autocannon
- Engine: UTD-20; 220 kW at 2,600 rpm
- Ground clearance: 0.35 meters
- Maximum speed: 65 km/h - on road 30 km/h - offroad

BVP-M is a Slovak modernization of the BPzV Svatava, which was a Czechoslovak reconnaissance variant of the BMP-1. The main element of the modernization was the installation of a TURRA 30 COAPS unmanned turret developed by the Slovak company EVPÚ. The modernization of the vehicle significantly increased its combat effectiveness, but some flaws from the original design of the BMP-1 still remain, like the low mine-resistance.

== Development ==
In 2013, the Slovak Ministry of Defence presented a modernization of the Soviet-era BVP-2s. (Note: BVP-2 stands for bojové vozidlo pěchoty – 2 – "Infantry Fighting Vehicle – 2") – Czechoslovak designation for the BMP-2.). The vehicle was given the designation BVP-M2SKCZ. Following military trials, many problems were discovered, and it was decided that such an in-depth modernization was not viable. Due to the unsuccessful military trials, the vehicle was never commissioned into service.

The Ministry of Defence consequently decided to change their approach to modernizing vehicles of soviet design and origin, and decided to modernize 35 vehicles to a smaller, but still significant extent. Overall, 18 were modernized into BPsVI, and 17 to the BVP-M. Multiple Slovak defence companies participated in the modernization, including Konštrukta – Defence, EVPÚ, and MSM Land Systems Division Trenčín.

== Design ==
=== Armament ===
The modernization of the vehicle consists of a general overhaul of the chassis, engine, transmission, but most notably of its armament. The old BMP-1 turret was replaced with an EVPU TURRA 30 COAPS unmanned turret.

==== Primary ====
The BMP-1's original 2A28 Grom gun was replaced with the BMP-2's 30 mm 2A42 autocannon. Although a much lower caliber, the autocannon also provided a much higher fire rate and was much better adapted to fighting more modern vehicles. The turret holds 330 rounds of 30 mm ammunition.

==== Secondary ====
The secondary weapon was a 7.62 mm PKMT coaxial machine gun that provided secondary and lighter fire. The PKMT replaced the previous PKT that was mounted on the BPzV Svatava with the main improvements being in reliability. The turret holds 600 rounds of 7.62 mm ammo as well.

==== ATGM ====
Even though the 9M14 Malyutka significantly helped the BMP-1 fight and defend itself from main battle tanks, it had to be replaced and two 9M113 Konkurs ATGMs were fitted into the turret. The turret however, can fire Spike ATGMs as well.

=== Crew equipment ===
The driver has a new DND-5F periscopic sight from the Czech company Meopta. The crew is connected via a Harris RF-7800I. Another part of the modernization is the Kestrel-5500 weather station.

The stabilization of the turret and the fire-control system combined with the gunner's sight significantly increases the accuracy. The commander's sight can take control of the gun as the turret allows the commander to see both static and moving targets and to fire at them. Both the gunner and the commander's sights feature Leonardo Tilde A thermal imagers with a resolution of 640 × 480, as well as a laser rangefinder. A laser warning receiver that works together with eight smoke grenade launchers in a fully automatic manner was also added. (Soft-kill APS) Additionally, the mine-resistance of the lower part of the vehicle was improved by adding mine-resistant seats and crew protection according to STANAG 4569 Level 2.

Another large part of the modernization was the improvements in crew comfort, with the installation of independent heating and cooling systems. The vehicle also comes with a full-vehicle camo netting which reduces its thermal signature and therefore makes detecting it harder.

== Operational service ==
=== NATO eFP Latvia ===
As a part of the Slovak contingent in Latvia, mechanized brigades on 10 BVP-2s were deployed which were soon followed by two additional BVP-M.

In total, only two BVP-M were used in NATO Enhanced Forward Presence - Latvia.

== Operators ==
Slovakia
Slovak Ground Forces

- 1st Mechanized Brigade – 17 vehicles in service.

=== Deliveries ===
Deliveries commenced in 2018, with 10 vehicles being delivered that year and were completed the in the following year, 2019, when the other seven were delivered.

== See also ==
- BMP-1
- BPzV Svatava
