= Military ranks of Slovakia (1939–1945) =

The military ranks of Slovakia during 1939–1945 were the military insignia used by the Slovak Republic's military and the Hlinka Guard. The Slovak Republic was a landlocked country, and therefore did not possess a navy.

== Military ranks ==
=== Commissioned officer ranks ===
The rank insignia of commissioned officers.

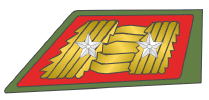
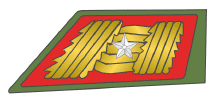
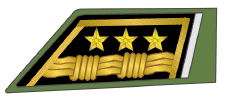
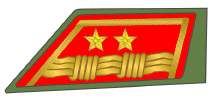
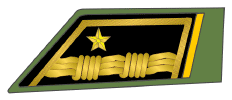
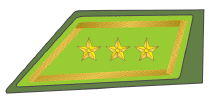
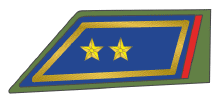
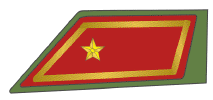
Rank group	General / flag officers		Senior officers			Junior officers
Ground & Air Force (1939–1940)
Ground & Air Force (1939–1940)		Generál	Plukovník	Podplukovník	Major	Stotník	Nadporučík	Poručík
Ground & Air Force (1940–1945)
Ground & Air Force (1940–1945)	Generál I. triedy	Generál II. triedy	Plukovník	Podplukovník	Major	Stotník	Nadporučík	Poručík
German equivalent	Generalleutnant	Generalmajor	Oberst	Oberstleutnant	Major	Hauptmann	Oberleutnant	Leutnant
Rank group	General / flag officers		Senior officers			Junior officers

=== Student officer ranks ===
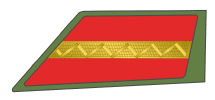
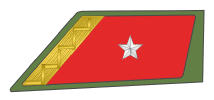
Rank group	Student officer
Ground & Air Force (1940–1945)
Ground & Air Force (1940–1945)	Vojenský akademik	Důstojnický zástupca

=== Other ranks ===
The rank insignia of non-commissioned officers and enlisted personnel.

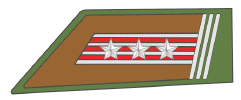
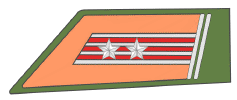
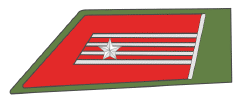
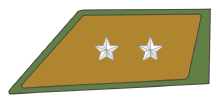
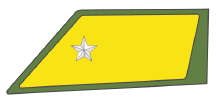
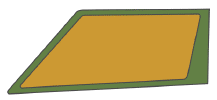
Rank group	NCOs			Enlisted
Ground & Air Force (1939–1940)
Ground & Air Force (1939–1940)	Zástavník	Rotník	Čatár	Desiatnik	Slobodník	Strelník
Ground & Air Force (1940–1945)
Ground & Air Force (1940–1945)	Zástavník	Rotník	Čatár	Desiatnik	Slobodník	Strelník
German equivalent	Oberfeldwebel	Feldwebel	Unterfeldwebel	Obergefreiter	Obersoldat	Soldat
Rank group	NCOs			Enlisted

=== Corps colours ===
Colour	Branch
Purple	Generals, staff officers and infantry
Red	Artillery and armourers
Yellow	Cavalry
Pink	Armoured units
Black	Medical corps and chaplains
Dark blue	Quartermaster
Sky blue	Air force
Dark brown	Engineers
Cinnamon brown	Communications
Light brown	Automotive
Violet	Judiciary
Light green	Cartographic

== Paramilitary ranks ==
=== Commanders ===
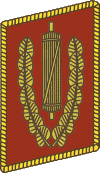
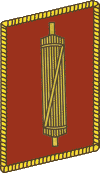
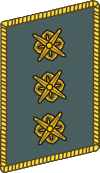
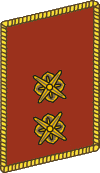
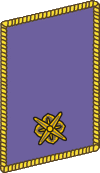
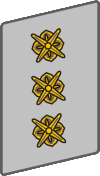
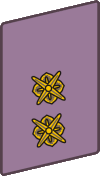
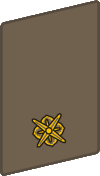
Rank group	Higher commanders		Middle commanders			Lower commanders
Hlinka Guard
Hlinka Guard	Hlavný veliteľ	Zborový veliteľ	Veliteľ divízie	Veliteľ pluku	Veliteľ praporu	Veliteľ skupiny	Veliteľ roty	Veliteľ čaty

=== Other ranks ===
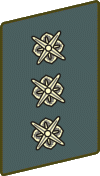
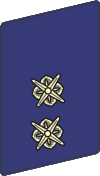
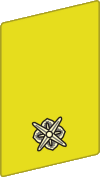
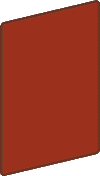
Rank group	NCOs			Enlisted
Hlinka Guard
Hlinka Guard	Čatár	Desiatnik	Slobodník	Gardista

== See also ==
- Military ranks of Slovakia
