= Military ranks of Slovakia =

The Military ranks of Slovakia are the military insignia used by the Slovak Armed Forces. Slovakia is a landlocked country, and therefore does not possess a navy.

== Commissioned officers ranks ==
The rank insignia of commissioned officers.

NATO code	OF-10	OF-9	OF-8	OF-7	OF-6	OF-5	OF-4	OF-3	OF-2	OF-1
Slovak Ground Forces
Slovak Ground Forces		Generál	Generálporučík (Note: The appropriate branch of service badge is pinned just under the top button of the for all ranks excluding full General.)	Generálmajor	Brigádny generál	Plukovník	Podplukovník	Major	Kapitán	Nadporučík	Poručík
(Slovakia) Slovak Air Force
(Slovakia) Slovak Air Force		Generál	Generálporučík	Generálmajor	Brigádny generál	Plukovník	Podplukovník	Major	Kapitán	Nadporučík	Poručík
NATO code	OF-10	OF-9	OF-8	OF-7	OF-6	OF-5	OF-4	OF-3	OF-2	OF-1

== Other ranks ==
The rank insignia of non-commissioned officers and enlisted personnel.

NATO code	OR-9	OR-8	OR-7	OR-6	OR-5	OR-4	OR-3	OR-2	OR-1
Slovak Ground Forces
Slovak Ground Forces	Štábny nadrotmajster	Nadrotmajster	Rotmajster	Rotný	Čatár	Desiatnik	Slobodník	Vojak 2. stupňa	Vojak 1. stupňa
(Slovakia) Slovak Air Force
(Slovakia) Slovak Air Force	Štábny nadrotmajster	Nadrotmajster	Rotmajster	Rotný	Čatár	Desiatnik	Slobodník	Vojak 2. stupňa	Vojak 1. stupňa
NATO code	OR-9	OR-8	OR-7	OR-6	OR-5	OR-4	OR-3	OR-2	OR-1

== 1990-2015 ==
Enlisted for the Army from 1990 to 2015.

NATO code	OR-9			OR-8		OR-7	OR-6	OR-5	OR-4	OR-3	OR-2	OR-1
Slovak Ground Forces (1990-2015)
Slovak Ground Forces (1990-2015)	Senior ensign Nadpráporčík	Ensign; Práporčík	Sub-ensign; Podpráporčík	Staff sergeant major Štábný nadrotmajster	Senior sergeant major Nadrotmajster	Sergeant major Rotmajster	Staff sergeant Rotný	Sergeant; Čatár	Corporal; Desiatnik	Lance corporal Slobodník	Private first class Vojak 2. stupňa	Private; Vojak 1. stupňa

== See also ==
- Military ranks of Slovakia (1939-1945)
