= 155 mm SpGH EVA =

Slovak 155 mm self-propelled howitzer

155mm SpGH EVA
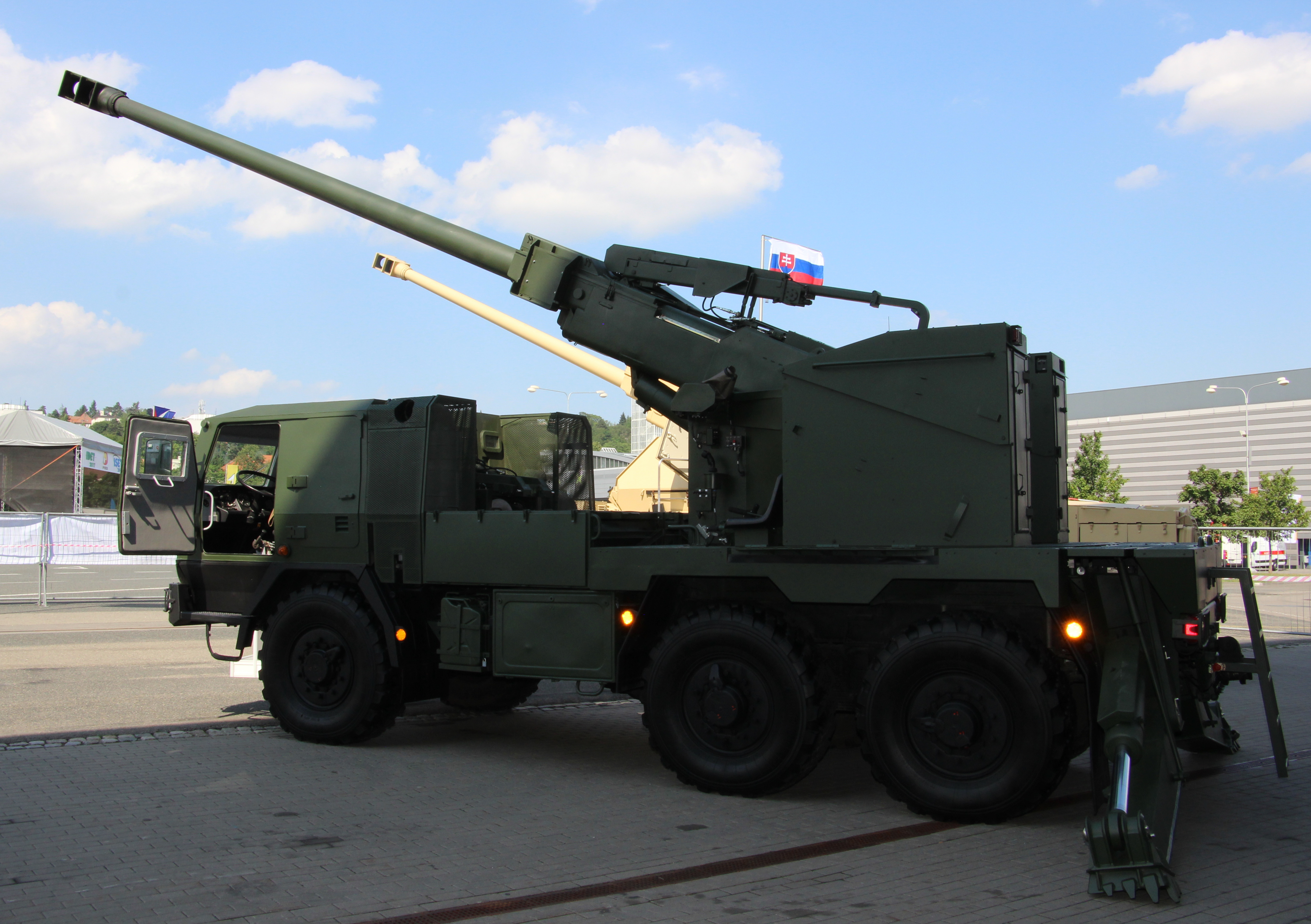
- EVA 155 mm 6×6 Self-propelled Gun Howitzer
- Type: Self-propelled gun
- Place of origin: Slovakia / Czech Republic - (truck chassis)

Specifications
- Mass: 6×6: 20.2 t (22.3 short tons). 8×8: 28 tonnes (30.9 short ton) combat weight.
- Length: 11.2 m (36 ft 9 in)
- Width: 2.55 m (8 ft 4 in)
- Height: 3.33 m (10 ft 11 in)
- Crew: 3
- Caliber: 155 mm (6.1")
- Barrels: 52-caliber
- Rate of fire: 5 rounds in the first minute 13 rounds in 3 minutes
- Maximum firing range: 41 km (25 mi) with ERFB-BB

155mm SpGH EVA M2
- Place of origin: Slovakia

Specifications
- Mass: 27 t (30 short tons) combat weight.
- Length: 11.3 m (37 ft 1 in)
- Width: 2.55 m (8 ft 4 in)
- Height: 3.3 m (10 ft 10 in)
- Crew: 3 to 5
- Caliber: 155 mm (6.1")
- Barrels: 52-caliber
- Elevation: 3.5°/+75°
- Traverse: ± 45°
- Rate of fire: 5 rounds in the first minute 13 rounds in 3 minutes
- Maximum firing range: 41 km (25 mi) with ERFB-BB over 50 km (31 mi) with VLAP

EVA is a Slovak-made self-propelled howitzer, developed by Konštrukta – Defence that was publicly revealed in 2015. The EVA is based on a Tatra 815 6×6 truck, but the system can be also mounted on an 8×8 truck chassis. It is armed with a 155 mm L52 howitzer and has a maximum firing range of 41 kilometres (25 mi) with ERFB-BB ammunition.

== Design ==
The EVA was created as a shared project between Konštrukta – Defence and ZTS-Špeciál, using technology developed for the Zuzana 2. It utilizes a 155 mm gun, 52-caliber, achieving a range of up to 41 km (25 mi) using specialized ERFB-BB munition. The firing rate is stated as up to five rounds in the first minute, and up to 13 rounds in three minutes. The vehicle carries 24 rounds in automatic magazines ready to fire. Firing is fully automated and can be performed from the inside of the armoured cabin. Multiple round simultaneous impact firing mode is supported and the howitzer can be connected to command and control system of a battalion battery.

High mobility is achieved by using Tatra 815 6×6 chassis, however the manufacturer states that there is an option for an 8×8 chassis as well. The model presented in 2015 offers range of up to 700 km (430 mi) with a top speed of 80 km/h (50 mph) using the 6×6 chassis. Dimensions and weight were kept under the limits of C-130, achieving high strategic mobility for the system.

Compared to designs of similar concept, the EVA offers a more compact design, lower weight, higher range, the ability to be transported using C-130 planes, as well as full automation of firing with minimal crew needed.

=== Variants ===
==== EVA M2 ====
155mm SpGH EVA M3

Specifications
- Mass: 28 t (31 short tons) combat weight.
- Length: 11.56 m (37 ft 11 in)
- Width: 2.55 m (8 ft 4 in)
- Height: 3.3 m (10 ft 10 in)
- Crew: 2 to 3
- Caliber: 155 mm (6.1")
- Barrels: 52-caliber
- Elevation: 3.5°/+75°
- Traverse: ± 30°
- Rate of fire: 5 rounds in the first minute 13 rounds in 3 minutes
- Maximum firing range: 40 km (25 mi) with standard ammunition, Over 50 km (31 mi) with VLAP ammunition

In August 2024, Konštrukta – Defence tested the EVA M2 variant (initially revealed in September 2023 under the name BIA). The shooting capabilities, structural integrity, and mobility were all improved. This variant is based on the Tatra 815 6×6 and is equipped with an armoured cabin.

The fire control system is processing on its own the firing solutions for the system. It takes into account the weather, ballistic, topography, and the targeting information. The barrel is aimed at the target automatically and an auto-loader loads the cannon.

==== EVA M3 ====
At IDEB 2026, Konštrukta – Defence, unveiled a brand new variant, the EVA M3. The new variant utilizes a newer, Tatra Force 3 chassis and cabin, unlike the Tatra Force 2 which were used on the previous variant. Visually, the cabins are significantly different between the two, while the EVA M2 had a four-door cabin, the new EVA M3 has a two-door cabin that can fit up to three crew members.

A large change occurred at the back of the vehicle, while the EVA M2 had two large stabilizing legs, the new EVA M3 has them combined into one and it's smaller. Another difference in the new variant is the way the gun can turn. On the M2, the gun would have to be rotated to its "transport position", and only then could the stabilizing legs be lifted. However, the M3 is capable of turning the gun and lifting the stabilizing legs concurrently.

==== Potential 4×4 Variant ====
Reportedly the manufacturer has announced the development of a lighter variant that would be based on a 4×4 chassis at the recent Polish–Slovak Defence-Industrial Dialogue in Bratislava.

== Production ==
In March 2026, the Slovak company Koval Systems officially launched mass production of the self-propelled howitzers.

The company is currently manufacturing superstructure components for the first batch of 16 vehicles that were ordered by the Slovak Armed Forces.

== Operators ==
=== Future operators ===
Slovakia
The Slovak Ministry of Defence signed a framework agreement for the EVA M3 in December 2025. Recently, it was discovered that the Slovak Armed Forces had ordered 16 vehicles.

=== Failed Bids ===
Malaysia
The EVA M2 was among the systems considered by Malaysia to become the next self-propelled howitzers. The Malaysian Armed Forces reportedly selected the EVA M2 in October 2024 as their future self-propelled howitzer. However, since then interest from the Malaysian side has decreased and after signing a contract for the French CAESAR, the prospect of the EVA M2 in the Malaysian Armed Forces came to an end. EVA won the tender at first but France with their political lobbing pushed the CEASAR.

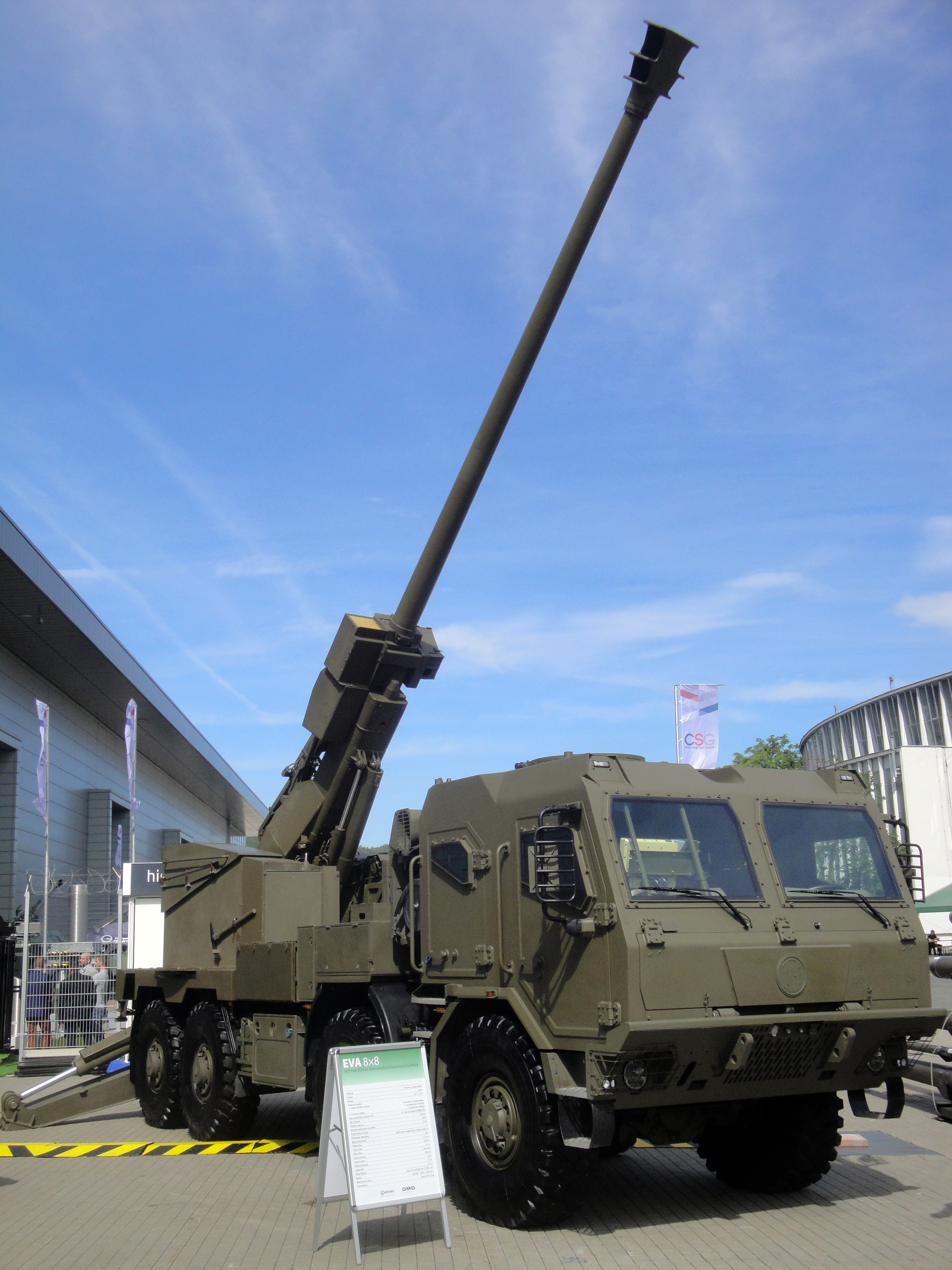
EVA 155 mm on 8×8 truck chassis

== See also ==
- Archer – (Sweden)
- DRDO ATAGS – (India)
- ATMOS 2000 – (Israel)
- A-222 Bereg – (Russia)
- 2S22 Bohdana – (Ukraine)
- CAESAR – (France)
- 152 mm SpGH DANA – (Czechoslovakia)
- G6 howitzer – (South Africa)
- AHS Kryl – (Poland)
- Nora B-52 – (Serbia)
- PCL-09 – (China)
- PCL-161 – (China)
- PCL-181 – (China)
- PLL-09 – (China)
- Type 19 155 mm wheeled self-propelled howitzer – (Japan)
- 155 mm SpGH Zuzana – (Slovakia)
- List of artillery
