= 1st Mechanized Brigade (Slovakia) =

- 1. mechanizovaná brigáda
- Active: 2000–present
- Country: Slovakia
- Branch: Ground Forces
- Type: Mechanized brigade
- Role: Operational, territorial and tactical activities
- Part of: Slovak Armed Forces Headquarters
- Garrison/HQ: Topoľčany
- Patron: Ján Golian
- Motto: Si vis pacem, para bellum

Commanders
- Current commander: 1 star general Alexander Kollárik

The 1st Mechanized Brigade of General Ján Golian is a mechanized brigade of the Ground Forces of the Slovak Republic. The headquarters of the 1st Mechanized Brigade is located in Topoľčany.

== Tasks ==
The main task of the 1st Mechanized Brigade is to "participate in the tasks of defense and protection of vital interests of Slovak republic and its allies against military and non-military threats by conducting military and non-military operations."

== Organizational structure ==
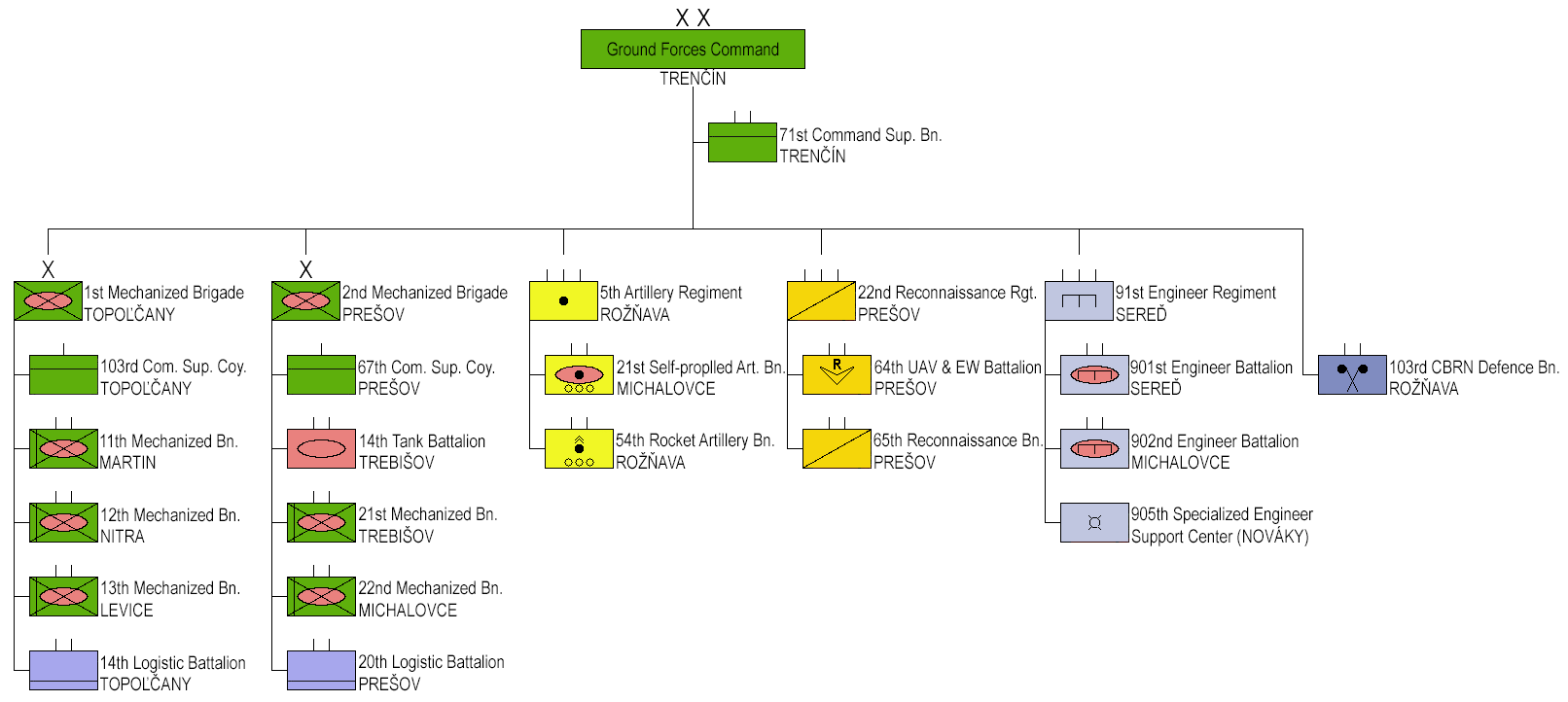
1st Mechanized Brigade in the structure of the Slovak Ground Forces (2024)

- HQ of the 1st Mechanized Brigade (Topoľčany)

=== 1st Mechanized Brigade ===
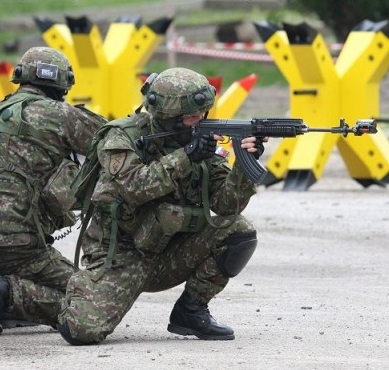
Soldiers of the 13th Mechanized Battalion

- 11th Mechanized Battalion, in Martin equipped with BVP-2
- 12th Mechanized Battalion, in Nitra equipped with BVP-2
- 13th Mechanized Battalion, in Levice equipped with BVP-2
  - Headquarters
  - 1st Mechanized Company
  - 2nd Mechanized Company
  - 3rd Mechanized Company
    - 1st Mechanized Platoon
    - 1st Mechanized Platoon
    - 1st Mechanized Platoon
    - Fire Support Platoon
  - Fire Support Company
    - Mortar Platoon
    - Anti-tank Platoon
    - Recon Platoon
  - Combat Support Company
    - HQ Platoon
    - Maintenance Platoon
    - Supply Platoon
  - Battalion Aid Station
- 14th Logistic Battalion, in Topoľčany

== Equipment ==
=== Firearms ===
==== Pistols ====
Model	Image	Origin	Variant	Caliber	Details
CZ 82		Czechoslovakia	—	9×18mm	Standard service pistol, will be replaced by Q1 pistol.
GP Q1		Slovakia	Q1/Q1S	9×19mm Parabellum	Future standard service pistol. The first pistols are expected to be handed to the soldiers in 2026.
CZ P-09		Czech Republic	CZ-09 S	9×19mm Parabellum	Unknown if they're being used specifically by the 1st Mechanized Brigade.

==== Assault rifles ====
Model	Image	Origin	Variant	Caliber	Details
vz. 58		Czechoslovakia	vz. 58 V vz. 58 P vz. 58 VM vz. 58 Pi	7.62×39mm	Standard service assault rifle of Slovak Army.; (It will be fully replaced by the Grand Power M4M1 by 2028)
GP M4M1		Slovakia	M4M	5.56×45mm NATO	New standard issue rifle, will completely phase out Vz. 58, CZ 805 BREN and M4 rifles.; The first rifles should be delivered to the soldiers in next year and the deliveries should be completed in 2028.

==== Sniper rifles ====
Model	Image	Origin	Variant	Caliber	Details
SVD		Soviet Union	OPu SVDN 1	7.62×54mmR	Standard designated marksman rifle of the Slovak Army.
R10		Slovakia	_	7.62×51mm NATO	New standard issue designated marksman rifle of the Slovak Army.
AW.50		United Kingdom	MK2	12.7×99mm NATO	

==== Machine guns ====
Model	Image	Origin	Variant	Caliber	Details
FN MINIMI		Belgium	Minimi Para 7.62 Mk3	5.56×45mm NATO 7.62×51mm NATO	Standard light machine gun of Slovak Army. 1600 machine guns ordered in 5.56mm. 30 machines gun in 7.62.
UK vz. 59		Czechoslovakia	UG vz. 59 L UG. vz 59 T	7.62×54mmR	Gradually replaced by FN Minimi.

==== Anti-tank weapons ====
Model	Image	Origin	Type	Variant	Caliber	Details
RPG-75		Czechoslovakia	Disposable recoilless gun	RPG-Cv-75 RPG-Šk-75	68mm	Standard anti-tank weapon of the Slovak Army.
RPG-7		Soviet Union	Rocket-propelled grenade launcher	V	85mm	Used by the 1st Mechanized Brigade.
9M113 Konkurs		Soviet Union	Anti-tank guided missile		135mm	Used by the 1st Mechanized Brigade.; Both individual launchers and 9P148 ATGM launcher vehicle.

=== Mortars ===
Model	Picture	Origin	Caliber	Quantity	Notes
L16 81mm		United Kingdom Canada	81mm	-	Also used by the 2nd Mechanized Brigade.
vz. 52	-	Czechoslovakia	82mm	-	
vz. 97		Slovakia	98mm	58	

== Vehicles ==
Model	Picture	Origin	Type	Quantity	Notes
Infantry fighting vehicles
CV 9035 Mk IV		Sweden Slovakia Czech Republic	Infantry fighting vehicle Reconnaissance Command post Armoured recovery Armoured engineering	0/152	Future standard infantry fighting vehicle; The Slovak Government signed off on the decision to procure 152 BAE Systems Hägglunds Combat Vehicle 90 Mark IV (CV90 MkIV) armed with a 35mm Bushmaster III cannon as its preferred tracked infantry fighting vehicle through a government-to-government (G2G) agreement with Sweden on 28 June 2022.
BVP-M		Czechoslovakia Soviet Union Slovakia	Infantry fighting vehicle	17	Modernized IFV from the BPzV Svatava.; 17 vehicles are in service.
BVP-2		Czechoslovakia Soviet Union	Infantry fighting vehicle	91	Inherited from Czechoslovakia.; Standard infantry fighting vehicle of the Slovak army.; Will be replaced by CV90.
Armoured personnel carriers
OT-90		Czechoslovakia	Armoured personnel carrier	?	Main armoured personnel carrier of Slovak army.
Tatrapan		Slovakia	Armoured personnel carrier	?	
Tank destroyers
9P148		Soviet Union	Tank destroyer	_	ATGM launcher vehicle with 5 wire-guided 9M113 Konkurs.; Unknown if still in service with the 1st Mechanized Brigade.
Light utility vehicles
Land Rover Defender 110 SW		United Kingdom Slovakia	Utility vehicle CBRN Command and control	_	Standard light vehicle of Slovak army.
Mercedes-Benz G-Class		Germany Austria	Utility vehicle	_	
UAZ-469		Soviet Union	Utility vehicle	~100	Should already be replaced and retired.
Ambulances
Mercedes-Benz G-300		Germany	Military ambulance	3	_
Volkswagen Transporter (T4)		Germany	Military ambulance	~30	_
Logistic trucks
Tatra T-815		Czechoslovakia	Military heavy truck	?	6x6, 8x8, 10x10 versions, platform for fuel tanker, multifit, crane, recovery vehicle, bridge vehicle, etc.
Tatra 815-7		Czech Republic	Military heavy truck	?	More ordered.
AKTIS 4x4 1R-08		Austria Germany Slovakia	Military medium truck	?	169 in service as of 2015.; Based on MAN TGM.; More ordered.
AKTIS 4x4 1R VV		Slovakia	Military medium truck	?	Based on Steyr 12M21
Praga V3S		Czechoslovakia	Military medium truck	?	Will be replaced by AKTIS and Tatra 815-7.
Engineering vehicles
VPV		Czechoslovakia	Armoured recovery vehicle	_	Will be replaced by CV 90 recovery variant.
AV-15		Czechoslovakia	Recovery vehicle	_	_
UDS Universal Excavators		Slovakia	Excavator	_	Used in Iraq.
AM 50		Czechoslovakia	Armoured vehicle-launched bridge	_	_
MT-55A		Czechoslovakia Soviet Union	Armoured vehicle-launched bridge	19	_
PM-55		Czechoslovakia	Armoured vehicle-launched bridge	_	_
PMS-815		Czechoslovakia	Pontoon bridger	_	_

== Insignia ==
The insignia of the 1st mechanized Brigade and its individual battalions includes coat of arms style emblems for each of the major components. The 1st Mechanized Brigade also has an honorary battle flag.

13th Mechanized Battalion (Levice)

== See also ==
- 2nd Mechanized Brigade of the Slovak Ground Forces
