= Konštrukta – Defence =

Slovakian state-owned arms manufacturer

Konštrukta - Defence
- Type: Corporation
- Industry: Arms industry, Armament engineering
- Founded: 30 April 1996
- Headquarters: Lieskovec 575/25, Dubnica nad Váhom, 018 41 Slovakia
- Area served: Europe
- Products: Self-propelled artillery, Artillery support vehicles
- Revenue: ▲€79.1 million (2022)
- Net income: ▲€13,9 million (2022)
- Total assets: ▼€42.1 million (2022)
- Total equity: ▲€19.6 million (2022)
- Number of employees: 150-199 (2023)
- Website: kotadef.sk

Konštrukta – Defence is a state-owned arms designer and manufacturer in Slovakia.

== History ==
Konštrukta Trenčín was founded in 1953, in the town of Trenčín. During the communist era, national economic policy was much more focused on defence; as the economy weakened in the 1980s, Konštrukta diversified into other branches of machine-building and manufacturing. In 1993, the government of Slovakia split the company into two parts; Konštrukta – Defence and Konštrukta – Industry. In 2004, Konštrukta – Defence was absorbed into the state-owned holding company "DMD Group" alongside ZTS – ŠPECIÁL, a manufacturing and engineering business.

== Products ==
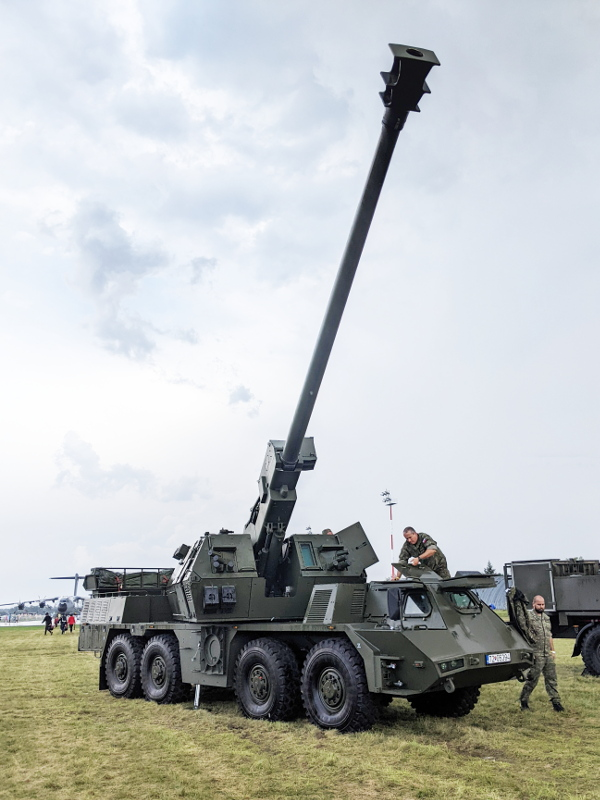
Zuzana 2

=== Self-propelled artillery 152mm ===
- DANA, 152mm 37L, 28t (1979)
- MODAN, an upgraded DANA, but with improved range, rate of fire, and accuracy, 152mm 42L, 28t (1999)
- ONDAVA 152mm, 47L, 28t (1992)

=== Self-propelled artillery 155mm ===
==== 155 mm SpGH Zuzana ====
- Zuzana, 155mm 45L, 31t (1997)
- Zuzana 2, 155mm 52L, 37t (2009) an updated version with a new gun and armoured cab.
- Himalaya, a prototype with Zuzana turret on a modified T-72 chassis.
- Diana, a prototype with Zuzana 2 turret on a UPG-NG track chassis (2015)

==== 155 mm SpGH EVA ====
- EVA, 155mm 52L, 20t (2015)
- EVA M2, 155mm 52L, 27t (2023)
- EVA M3, 155mm 52L, (2026)

=== Other products ===
- DELOSYS, an artillery fire control system
- Zuzana MV, an ammunition supply vehicle to support the Zuzana 2.
- Tatrapan, now manufactured by VYVOJ Martin
