= 155 mm SpGH Zuzana =

Slovak 155mm self-propelled gun-howitzer

155mm SpGH Zuzana
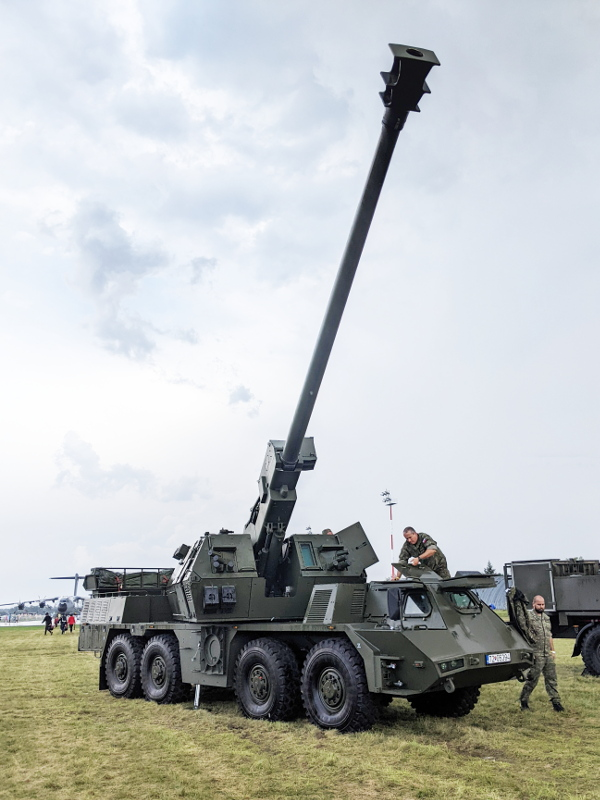
- Zuzana 2 at SIAF 2022, Malacky Air Base
- Type: Self-propelled gun
- Place of origin: Slovakia

Service history
- In service: 1998–present
- Used by: Slovakia; Cyprus; Ukraine
- Wars: Russo-Ukrainian War

Production history
- Designer: Konštrukta Trenčín
- Unit cost: Zuzana 2: EUR 5.75 million (2022)
- Produced: vz. 2000 Zuzana: 1998-2007; Zuzana 2: 2019-present
- No. built: vz. 2000 Zuzana: 16; M2000G Zuzana: 12; Zuzana 2: 49
- Variants: Production models: vz. 2000 Zuzana; M2000G Zuzana; Zuzana 2 Tracked prototypes: Zuzana A 40 Himalaya; Diana 155mm

Specifications
- Mass: vz. 2000 Zuzana: 28.45 t (31.36 short tons); Zuzana 2: 33.80 t (37.26 short tons)
- Length: vz. 2000 Zuzana: 12.97 m (42 ft 7 in); Zuzana 2: 14.2 m (46 ft 7 in)
- Width: vz. 2000 Zuzana: 3.01 m (9 ft 11 in); Zuzana 2: 3.1 m (10 ft 2 in)
- Height: vz. 2000 Zuzana: 3.3 m (10 ft 10 in); Zuzana 2: 3.5 m (11 ft 6 in)
- Crew: 4 (driver, gun commander, charge operator, projectile operator)
- Caliber: 155 mm (6.1")
- Barrels: vz. 2000 Zuzana: 45-caliber Zuzana 2: 52-caliber
- Secondary armament: M2 Browning
- Engine: vz. 2000 Zuzana: V12 engine Tatra T3-930-52 265 kW (355 hp); Zuzana 2: V8 engine Tatra T3D-928-70 325 kW (436 hp)
- Drive: vz. 2000 Zuzana: Tatra 815 8x8 Zuzana 2: Tatra 817 8x8
- Operational range: vz. 2000 Zuzana: 750 km (470 mi); Zuzana 2: 600 km (370 mi)
- Maximum speed: vz. 2000 Zuzana: 80 km/h (50 mph); Zuzana 2: 90 km/h (56 mph)

The Zuzana 155 mm Self-propelled gun howitzer is a Slovak artillery system developed by Konštrukta – Defence, with a 45-caliber gun and automatic loader for loading of both projectile and charge. It is an evolution of the 152mm SpGH DANA.

The gun has a long range, high accuracy, a high rate of fire, it can be prepared promptly for firing, and it has a high level of mobility ensured by a modified Tatra 8×8 chassis. The design of the gun allows it to use any NATO standard 155 mm ammunition. The fire control system allows for a multiple-round simultaneous-impact (MRSI) mode. One of the unique features of Zuzana is that the gun is mounted externally in between two totally separated compartments of the turret. This makes the crew inherently safe from any potentially dangerous mechanics of the gun and its autoloader. Additionally, the crew is protected from the gasses generated during firing.

== Variants ==
=== vz. 2000 Zuzana ===
The original wheeled version adopted by the Slovak Ground Forces in 1998.

=== M2000G Zuzana ===
A modified version made for the Hellenic Army, later resold to Cyprus. It's armed with lighter 7.62 mm roof-mounted machine guns.

=== Zuzana 2 ===
Updated version with a new 52-calibre gun, full 360-degree turret traverse and a new armored cab. It has passed Slovak Army trials in December 2009. The Slovak Ground Forces ordered 25 vehicles.

The new version is claimed to possess Multiple Rounds Simultaneous Impact (MRSI) capability.

=== Himalaya ===
A 1990's adaptation of the original system to a tracked chassis required by export customers. It is essentially a Zuzana turret mounted on a T-72 chassis. The tracked version did not achieve orders beyond initial evaluation units and further production is highly unlikely.

=== Diana ===
A joint project between Konštrukta – Defence (Slovakia) and Bumar-Labedy (Poland). It uses the Zuzana 2 turret on an UPG-NG tracked chassis. A prototype was showcased at the International Defence Industry Exhibition in Poland in Kielce in 2015.

== Specifications ==
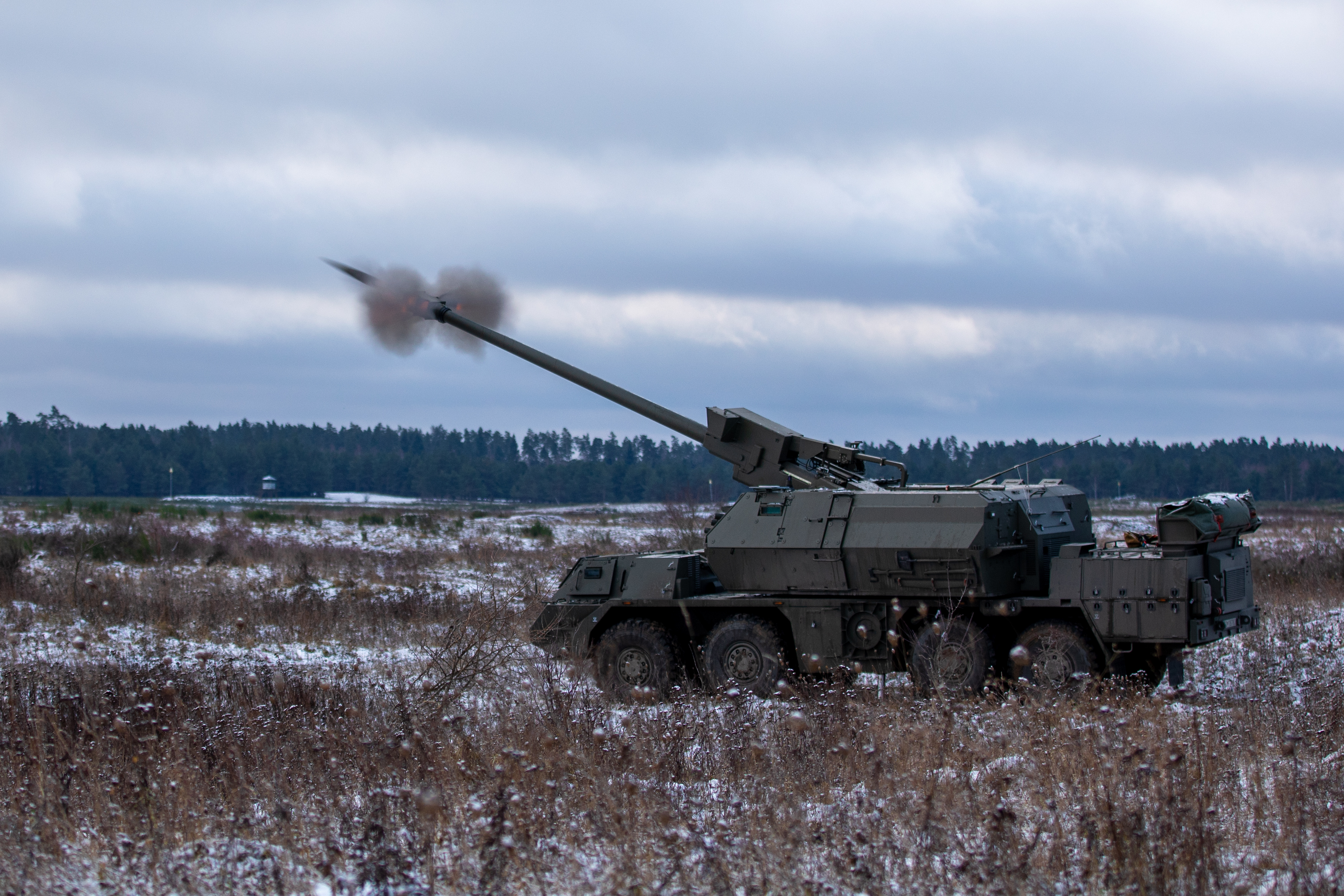
21st Self-Propelled Artillery Battalion's Zuzana 2 155mm howitzer fires a projectile during a US-Slovak live-fire exercise at Bemowo Piskie Training Area, Poland, November 30, 2021.

| | vz. 2000 Zuzana | Zuzana 2 |
|---|---|---|
| Caliber: | 155 mm (6.1") | |
| Barrel length: | 45 cal | 52 cal |
| Ammunition carried: | 40 projectiles & 40 charges | |
| Maximum firing range: | 39.6 km (24.6 mi) | 41 km (25 mi) with ERFB-BB; 50 km (31 mi) with VLAP |
| Minimum range: | 5.6 km (3.5 mi) | |
| Rate of fire: | 6 rounds /min. | 5 rounds /min. |
| Sustained rate of fire: | 5 rounds /min. | 4.3 round/min. (13 rounds in 3 minutes) |
| Ammunition loading: | Fully automatic | |
| Turret traverse: | ±60° | 360°, firing within ±60° |
| Gun elevation/depression: | +70°/-3,5° | +75°/-3,5° |
| Crew: | 4 (driver, gun commander, charge operator, projectile operator). | |
| Chassis: | Tatra 815 VP31 8x8 | Tatra 817 8x8 |
| Engine: | V12 Tatra T3-930-52 | V8 Tatra T3D-928-70 |
| Engine power: | 265 kW (355 hp) | 325 kW (436 hp) |
| Vehicle length: | 12.97 m (42.6 ft) | 14.2 m (47 ft) |
| Vehicle width: | 3 m (9.8 ft) | 3.1 m (10 ft) |
| Total height: | 3.3 m (11 ft) | 3.5 m (11 ft) |
| Total weight of the system: | 28.45 t (31.36 short tons) | 33.80 t (37.26 short tons) (combat weight) |
| Maximum speed: | 80+ km/h (50+ mph) | 90 km/h (56 mph) |
| Operational range: | 750 km (470 mi) | 600 km (370 mi) |
| Obstacle crossing: | | |
| Trench: | 2 m (6.6 ft) | 2.1 m (6.9 ft) |
| Vertical step: | 0.6 m (2.0 ft) | |
| Fording: | 1.4 m (4.6 ft) | |

Map of ZUZANA operators

== Operators ==
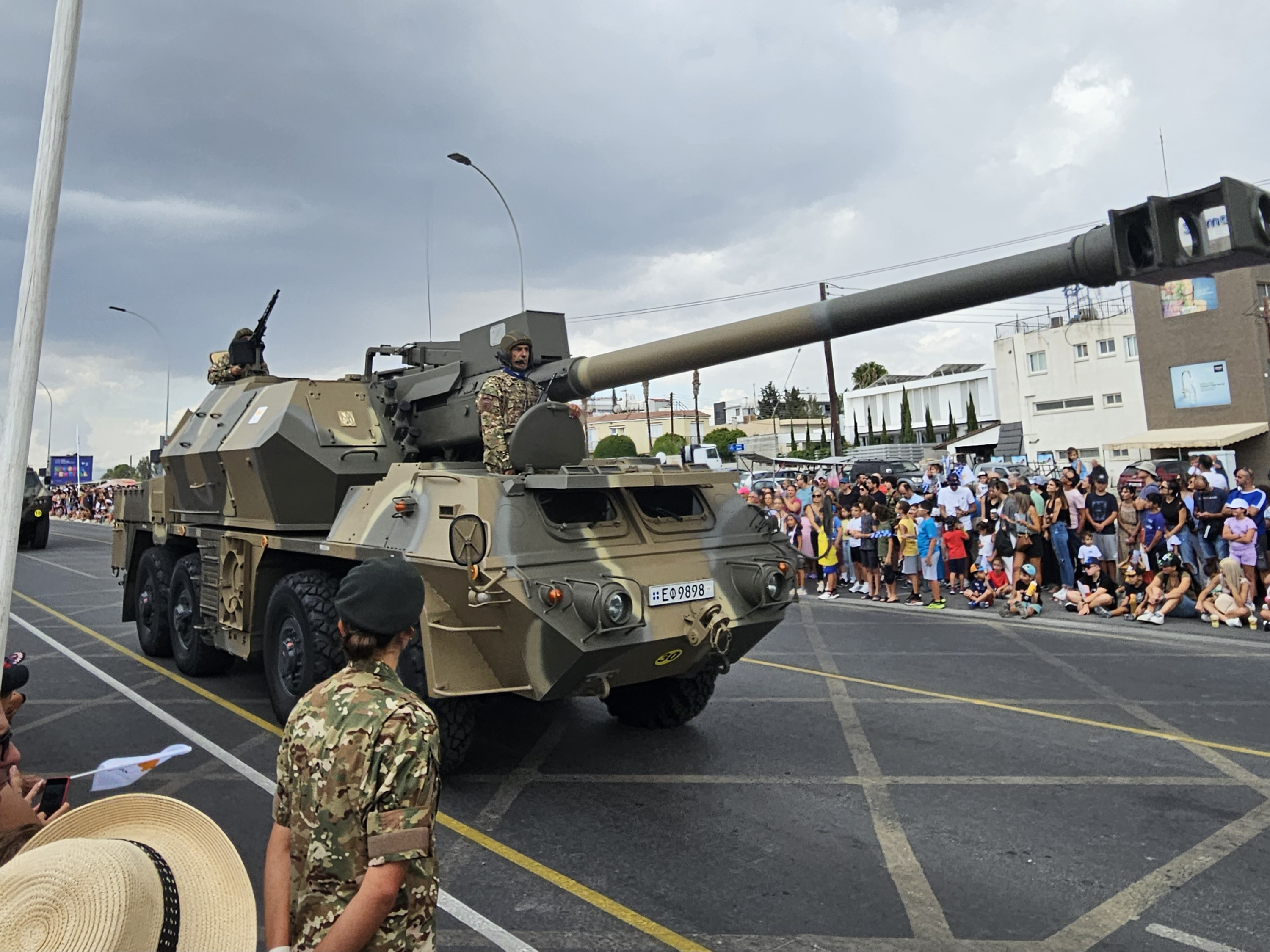
Zuzana self-propelled howitzer of the Cypriot National Guard in October 1st Parade.

=== Current operators ===
Cyprus (12)
The Cypriot National Guard operates 12 Zuzana M2000G, which were bought from Greece

Slovakia (35 - 41)
- 16 Zuzana vz. 2000 in service since 1998.
- 25 Zuzana 2 ordered, around 19 units in service. It is unknown whether the last batch of six vehicles was delivered by November 2025.

Ukraine (< 24)

- 24 Zuzana 2 acquired as of September 2024. At least three were destroyed and at least one was damaged.

- First order of eight vehicles was confirmed in May 2022 by the Slovak Minister of Defence, Jaroslav Naď, with training of crews commencing immediately. The first order was completed as on 18 January 2023.
- A second order of 16 units was signed on 2 October 2022, with Denmark, Germany and Norway providing the funding. In early July 2023, during a joint press conference with Volodymyr Zelenskyy, the president of Slovakia, Zuzana Čaputová, referred to a contract covering the procurement of 16 Zuzana 2 self-propelled guns. This was misinterpreted by various news outlets as a contract for an additional production of 16 units, however this was referring to the aforementioned contract signed in October 2022.

=== Failed bids ===
Georgia - Georgian Land Forces
The Slovak Defence Minister claimed that his Georgian counterpart expressed interest in acquiring the system during the meeting which took place on 20 December 2021. According to multiple sources, Slovakia plans to halt production of the Zuzana 2 after the war in Ukraine reshaped customer preferences. Slovakia and the manufacturer Konštrukta – Defence are focused on developing the EVA self-propelled artillery.

=== Former operators ===
Greece - Hellenic Army
Operated 12 Zuzana M2000G, later all of which were sold to the Cypriot National Guard.

== See also ==
- 155 mm SpGH EVA – Slovak 155 mm self-propelled howitzer
- 152 mm SpGH DANA – Czechoslovak self-propelled howitzer
