= Ground Forces of the Slovak Republic =

Branch of the Slovak Armed Forces

Ground Forces of the Slovak Armed Forces
- Pozemné sily Ozbrojených síl Slovenskej republiky
- Coat of arms
- Founded: 1939–1945; 1993–present
- Country: Slovakia
- Branch: Army
- Part of: Armed Forces of the Slovak Republic
- Command HQ: Veliteľstvo Pozemných síl OS SR – Trenčín

Commanders
- Commander: Major General Ivan Pach

The Slovak Ground Forces (Slovak: Pozemné sily Ozbrojených síl Slovenskej republiky), are the land forces of the Slovak Armed Forces.

== Organization ==
- Ground Forces Command, in Trenčín
  - 71st Command Support Battalion, in Trenčín
  - 103rd Nuclear, Biological and Chemical Defence Battalion, in Rožňava
  - 1st Mechanized Brigade, in Topoľčany
    - 103rd Command Support Company, in Topoľčany
    - 11th Mechanized Battalion, in Martin (BVP-2)
    - 12th Mechanized Battalion, in Nitra (BVP-2)
    - 13th Mechanized Battalion, in Levice (BVP-2)
    - 14th Logistic Battalion, in Topoľčany
  - 2nd Mechanized Brigade, in Prešov
    - 67th Command Support Company, in Prešov
    - 14th Tank Battalion, in Trebišov (T-72M1 and Leopard 2A4)
    - 21st Mechanized Battalion, in Trebišov (BVP-1)
    - 22nd Mechanized Battalion, in Michalovce (BVP-1)
    - 20th Logistic Battalion, in Prešov
  - 5th Artillery Regiment, in Rožňava
    - 21st Self-Propelled Artillery Battalion, in Michalovce (155 mm SpGH Zuzana 2)
    - 54th Rocket-Launcher Battalion, in Rožňava (RM-70/85)
  - 22nd Reconnaissance Regiment , in Prešov
    - 64th Unmanned Aerial Vehicles & Electronic Warfare Battalion, in Prešov
    - 65th Reconnaissance Battalion, in Prešov
    - 11th Unmanned Aerial Vehicles Experimental and Training Battalion in Bratislava
  - 91st Engineer Regiment, in Sereď
    - 901st Engineer Battalion, in Sereď
    - 902nd Engineer Battalion, in Michalovce
    - 905th Specialized Engineer Support Center, in Nováky

== Slovak Ground Forces organization graphic ==
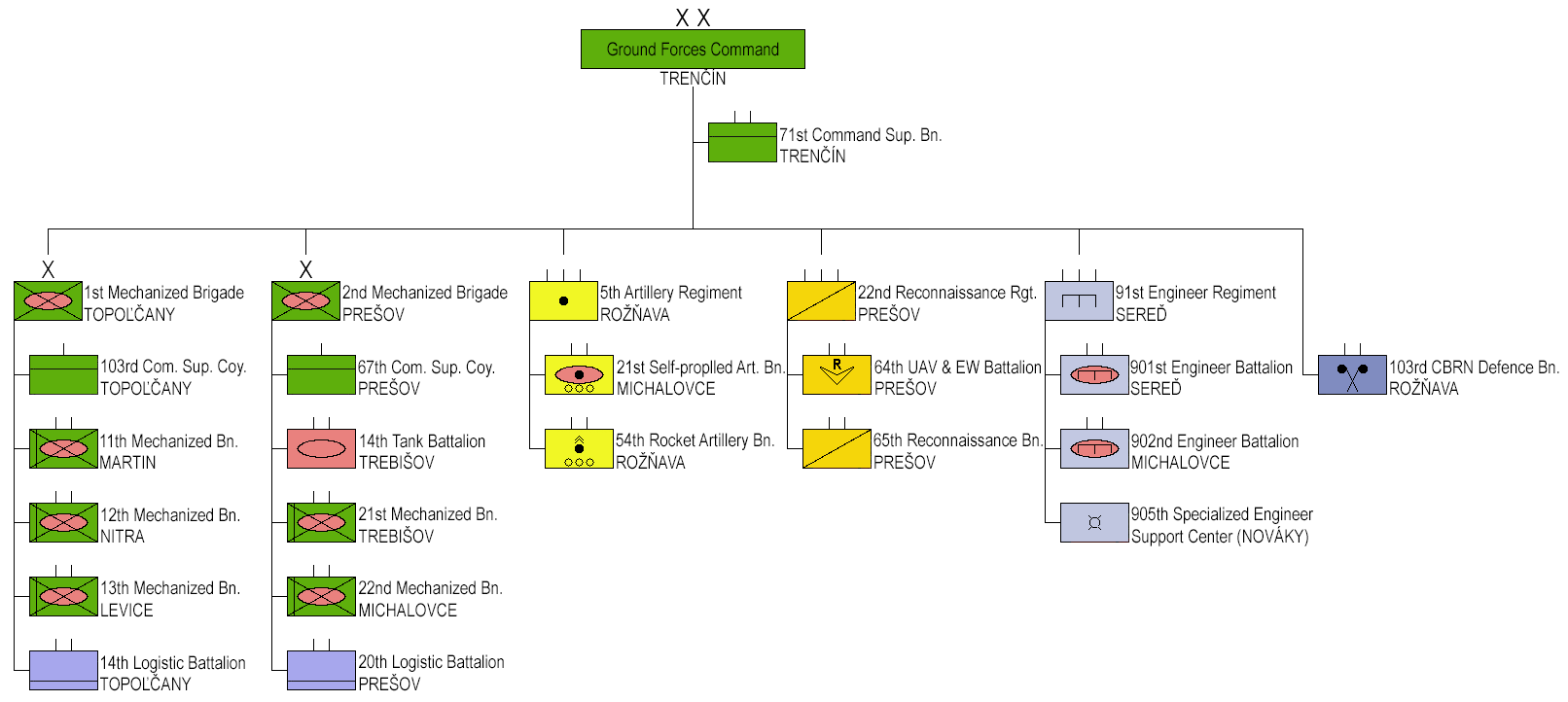
Slovak Ground Forces organization as of April 2026

== Slovak Ground Forces map ==
Slovak Ground Forces battalion locations 2026:
Brigade HQs Tank units Mechanized units Artillery Reconnaissance Engineers Command Support CBRN-Defense Logistics

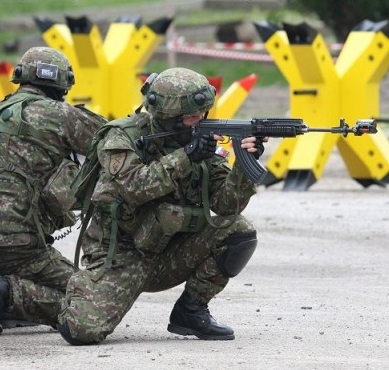
Soldiers of the 13th Mechanized Battalion
