= Reva APC =

Reva 4x4 APC
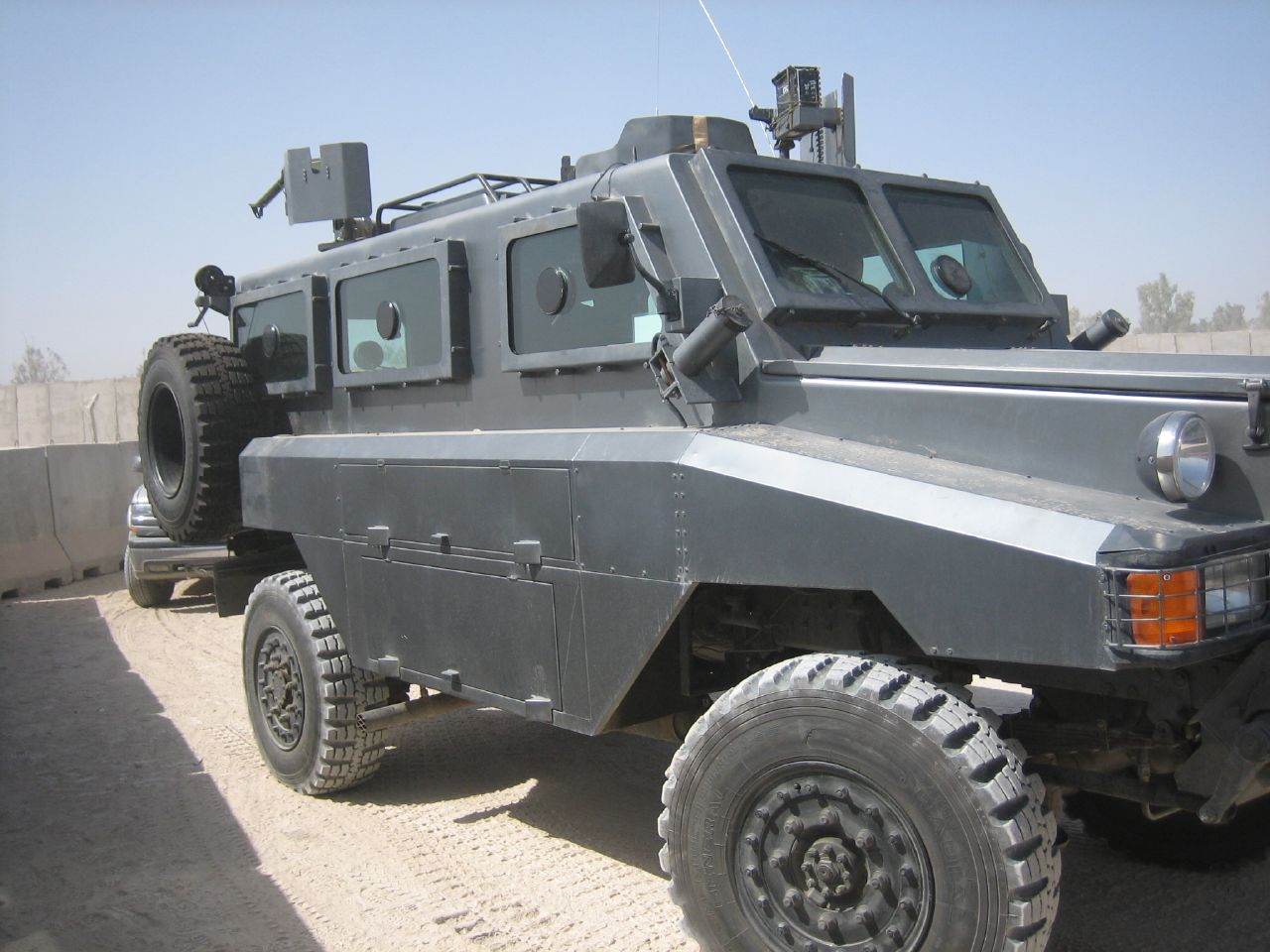
- A Reva 4x4 APC at Camp Victory, Iraq
- Type: Armoured personnel carrier
- Place of origin: South Africa

Specifications
- Mass: 7.8 t
- Length: 6.0 m
- Width: 2.48 m
- Height: 2.4 m
- Crew: 10
- Main armament: various machine guns
- Engine: Cummins GBT - 5.9 TC 6-cylinder in-line water-cooled direct-injection turbocharged diesel engine 132kW
- Suspension: 4×4-wheeled
- Operational range: 500 km
- Maximum speed: 100 km/h (62 mph)

The REVA Armoured Personnel Carrier (APC) is a mine-protected vehicle. It is produced by Integrated Convoy Protection. The vehicle’s V-shaped hull offers protection against land mines and Improvised Explosive Devices (IED)s. The vehicle has space for at least 10 passengers. Ten firing ports are also available. Two light machine guns can be used and cover a 360-degree on roller bearing turret hatches.

The vehicle is often confused with the Mamba and the RG-31.

== Production history ==
=== Variants ===
The REVA 4x4 APC is available as a 10-seater vehicle which includes the driver and co-driver. It was designed in October 2004. ICP are the owners of the Blue Print data pack of the REVA 4x4.

Other models available are:

- A command and control vehicle
- An ambulance
- A recovery vehicle
- A VIP carrier

== Operators ==
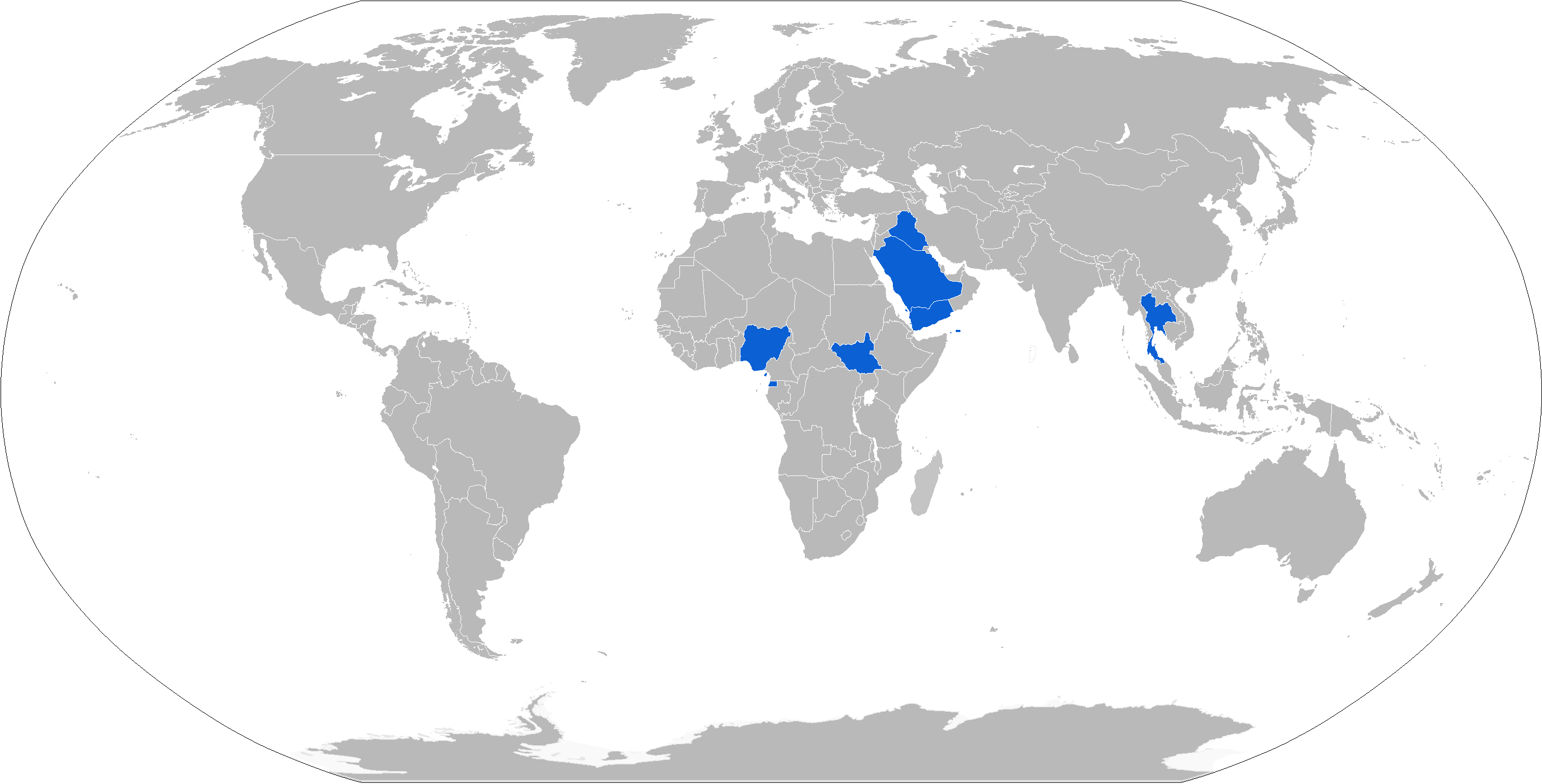
Map with Reva operators in blue

=== Current operators ===
- Egypt: Used by the Rapid Deployment Forces (Egypt)
- Equatorial Guinea: 25
- Iraq: 115
- Nigeria : 40
- Saudi Arabia: 25
- South Sudan: 10
- Thailand: 87
- Yemen: 112

=== Captures ===
- Islamic State: 2 destroyed vehicles were left by Iraqi SWAT after the First Battle of Tikrit in July 2014.

== Combat history ==
- Boko Haram insurgency
- Iraq War
- Iraqi insurgency (2011–2013)
- First Battle of Tikrit
- South Sudanese Civil War

== See also ==
Other wheeled APCs and IFVs developed in South Africa

- RG-33
- RG-32
- RG-12
- Mamba
- Puma (South African, new construction by Regis Trading International (Pty) Ltd, which is similar to the Mamba
- Ratel IFV
- Casspir
- Buffel

General

- Infantry fighting vehicle
- List of AFVs
