= RCV-9 =

- Type: Armoured Personnel Carrier
- Place of origin: South Africa

Specifications
- Mass: 6.9 t
- Length: 5.38 m
- Width: 2.1 m
- Height: 2.08 m
- Crew: 1+8
- Engine: turbocharged diesel engine 120 HP (88 KW)
- Suspension: 4×2 wheeled
- Operational range: 675
- Maximum speed: 100 km/h

The RCV-9 is an armoured personnel carrier intended for riot control purposes and manufactured by Land Systems OMC (a business unit of BAE Systems) of South Africa. It is also referred to as the Nongqai, Uklebe or Falcon. The vehicle was designed mainly for internal security, specifically in protecting high-risk infrastructure such as airports and power stations.

The RCV-9 was also marketed to be able to be used as a logistical transport vehicle, a military ambulance, a reconnaissance vehicle, a mobile command post, and a weapons carrier.

The first prototype of the vehicle was completed in 1986, and production started a year later in 1987. The vehicle was designed with longevity in mind, as well as using already proven commercially available components, however a purpose-designed double-wishbone suspension is utilised to meet specific operational requirements set by designers. The hull of the RCV-9 is made of welded steel armour construction, providing complete protection from intermediate cartridges such as 7.62x39mm. The engine is mounted in the rear. On the roof of the vehicle are three roof hatches, one above the front compartment, and two in the rear troop compartment. The rear compartment has a built-in firing port for each passenger, whilst the rear doors have an extra two firing ports alongside bulletproof windows. The RCV is no longer being marketed, being largely replaced by the RG-12.

== Operators ==
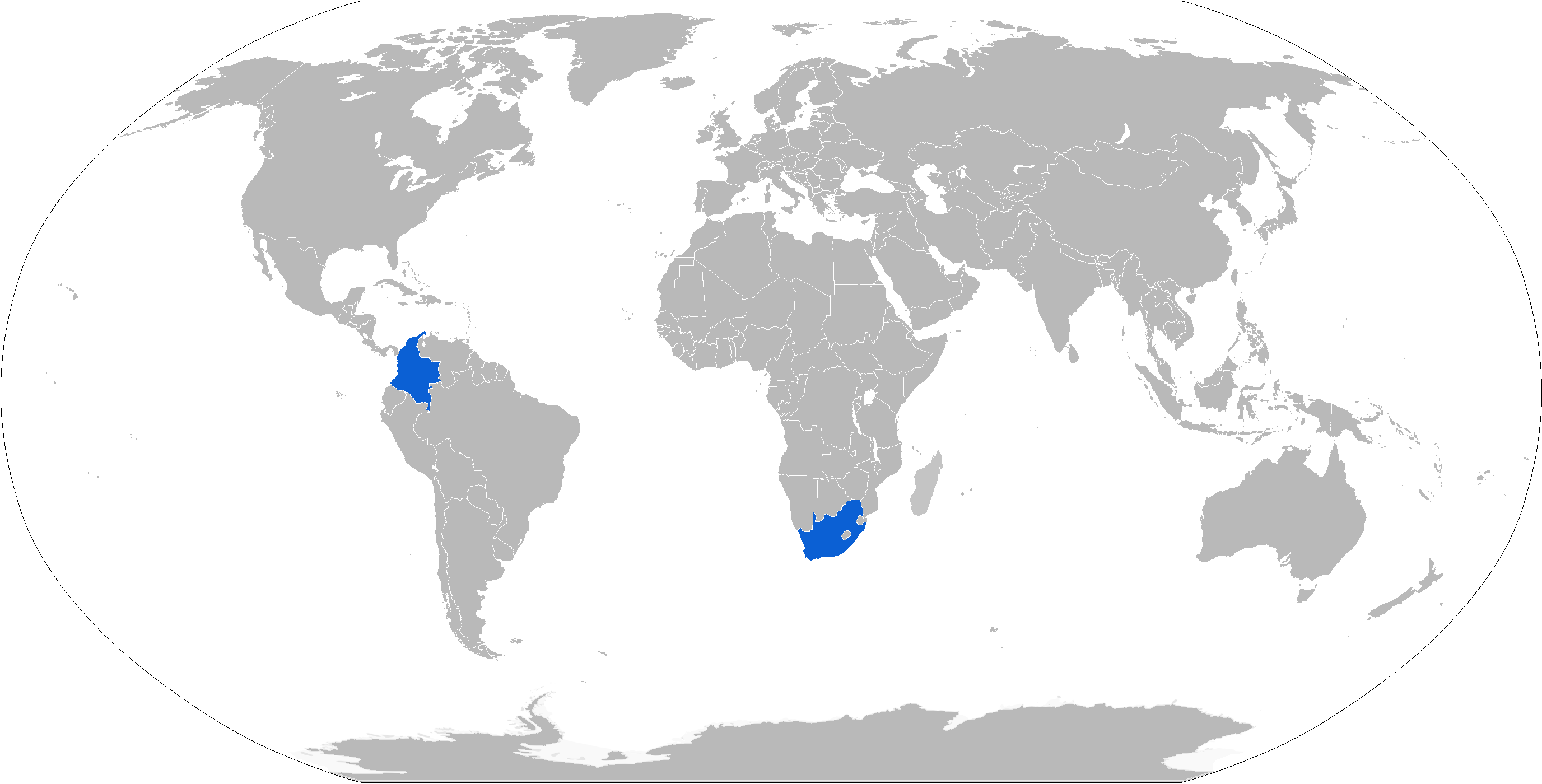
Map with RCV-9 operators in blue

=== Current operators ===
- Colombia (60)
- South Africa (South African Police Service)

== See also ==
- Buffel
- Mamba APC
- RG-12
- RG-19
- RG-31
- RG-32
- RG-33
- RG-34
- RG-35
