= RG-19 =

- Type: Armoured Personnel carrier APC
- Place of origin: South Africa

Specifications
- Mass: 6.48 t
- Length: 4.9 m
- Width: 2.2 m
- Height: 2.4 m
- Crew: 2+8
- Engine: Mercedes-Benz OM 352 diesel engine 123 HP (90 KW)
- Suspension: 4×4 wheeled
- Operational range: 500 km
- Maximum speed: 96 km/h

The RG-19 Caddie is a prototype armoured personnel carrier manufactured by TFM of South Africa. The company was later taken over by Reunert Defence OMC.

== Production history ==
It was developed in 1982 as a private venture by TFM and a prototype was produced in 1992. It was based on the Unimog 416 chassis.

== See also ==
- Mamba APC
- RCV-9
- RG-12
- RG-31
- RG-32
- RG-33
- RG-34
- RG-35
