= Reunert =

Reunert is a surname and given name, likely of South African origin. Notable people with the surname or given name include:

== Surname ==
- Clive Reunert (1887–1953), South African first-class cricketer and barrister
- John Reunert (1886–1946), South African first-class cricketer

== Given name ==
- Ronnie Bauser (1928–2017), real name Reunert Bauser, South African rugby union player

== See also ==
- Reinert
