= BAE Panther =

BAE Panther may refer to:

- Iveco LMV, a small armoured vehicle supplied to the British Army branded as a BAE product
- RG-33, Medium Mine Protected Vehicle
