= Umzimvubu Regiment =

- Active: February 2016 – present
- Country: South Africa
- Branch: South African Army
- Type: Motorised infantry
- Part of: South African Army Infantry Formation
- Garrison/HQ: Umzimvubu, Eastern Cape
- Anniversaries: February 2016 (founded)
- Equipment: Mamba APC

Commanders
- Current commander: Lt Col Roger A. Keeton

Insignia
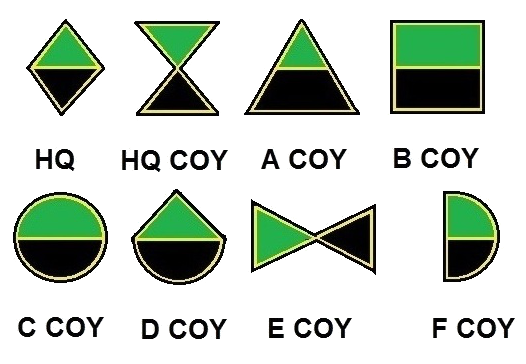
- Company level insignia

Umzimvubu Regiment is the first South African Army Reserve unit created after the 1994 elections.

== Controversy ==
There has been some controversy about the handling of a call-up of members of the regiment for Operation Prosper which has garnered national attention.

== SANDF's Motorised Infantry ==
SANDF's Motorised Infantry is transported mostly by Samil trucks, Mamba APC's or other unprotected motor vehicles. Samil 20, 50 and 100 trucks transport soldiers, towing guns, and carrying equipment and supplies. Samil trucks are all-wheel drive, in order to have vehicles that function reliably in extremes of weather and terrain. Motorised infantry have an advantage in mobility allowing them to move to critical sectors of the battlefield faster, allowing better response to enemy movements, as well as the ability to outmaneuver the enemy.

== Leadership ==
Leadership
From	Honorary Colonel	To	Ribbon
	No known incumbents		
From	Officer Commanding	To	Ribbon
February 2016	Lt Col Roger A. Keeton	n.d.	
From	Regimental Sergeants Major	To	Ribbon
	No known incumbents		
