= Okapi (disambiguation) =

An okapi is a giraffid artiodactyl mammal native to the Ituri Rainforest in central Africa.

Okapi may also refer to:

- De Havilland Okapi, a British two-seat day bomber of the 1910s built by de Havilland
- Okapi (knife), a lockback or slipjoint knife originally produced in 1902 for export to Germany's colonies in Africa
- Okapi BM25, a ranking function used by search engines to rank matching documents according to their relevance to a given search query
- Okapi Framework (localization), an environment to build inter-operable tools for the different steps of the translation and localization process
- Okapi MPV, a 6 x 6 mine-protected vehicle (MPV) which can be configured for command and control, fire control post or specialised anti-mine equipment carrier
- Okapi Wildlife Reserve, a World Heritage Site in the Ituri Forest in the north-east of the Democratic Republic of the Congo
- Okapi (website), an online magazine launched by Books.com.tw since 2010
- Radio Okapi, a radio network that operates in the Democratic Republic of the Congo
