= Medium Mine Protected Vehicle =

US mine resistant vehicle

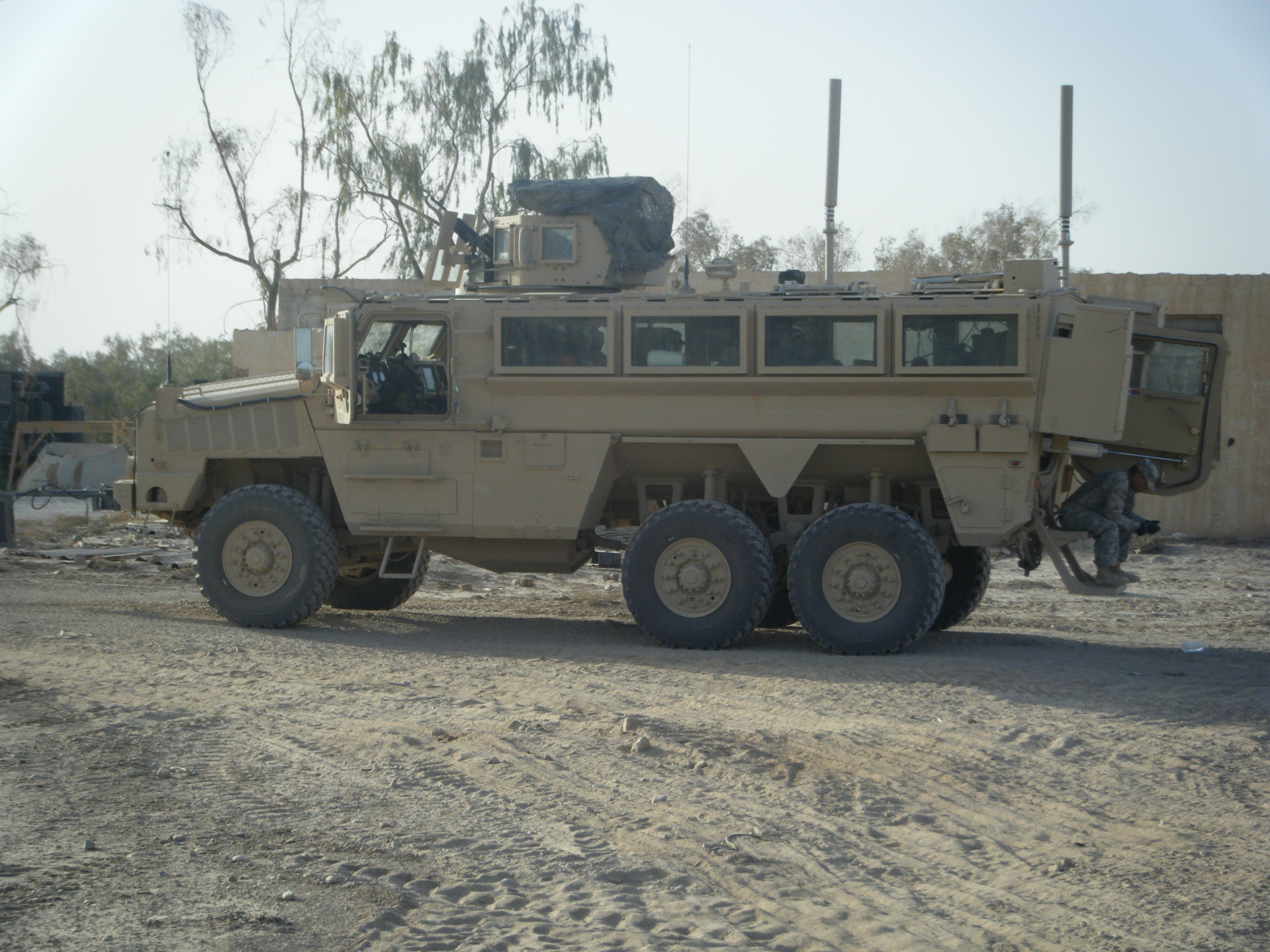
An RG-33 MMPV during 2008

The Medium Mine Protected Vehicle (MMPV) is a class of armored vehicles being procured by the US Army, similar to the MRAP program, which is being pursued by the US Army and the US Marine Corps.

The Army's MMPV executive summary states: "The Medium Mine Protected Vehicle (MMPV) is a blast protected, wheeled vehicle platform that will operate in explosive hazardous environments to support emerging Future Engineer Force (FEF) Clearance Companies in route and area clearance operations, Explosive Hazards Teams in explosive hazards reconnaissance operations, and EOD companies in Explosive Ordnance Disposal operations."

According to a US Army spokesperson: "What separates these programs are different schedules and sustainment requirements, resulting in different acquisition strategies and source selection criteria priorities. The MMPV... (Program of Record with emphasis on sustainment) and MRAP (emphasis on urgent fielding) have been in close coordination, especially from a hardware perspective."

== Specifications ==
TARDEC's informational papers state the requirements of the MMPV to be as follows:

- 100% of communication interfaces; services; policy enforcement controls; and data correctness available. SINCGARS and FBCB2 included as part of baseline configuration
- Transportable by rail, sealift, highway, air (C-5, C-17, C-130) without disassembly
- Operator and crew survive (PROVIDE PROTECTION LEVEL AND STANDOFF RANGE):
  - AT Mine blast
  - Ballistic Protection
  - RPG Protections
  - IED Protection
- Engine and suspension must be able to handle payload weight of 9000 lb at speeds up to 62 mph on improved “paved” roads
- Operate by 1 Soldier with ability to transport 6 additional Soldiers / EOD variant will have 1 operator with ability to transport 3 additional Soldiers and 2 robots
- Designed for quick repair (< 8 hrs repair time after blast) in the field after a mine blast
- Initial maintenance provided through CLS. Battle damage repair kits and detailed manuals need to be provided. Manuals need to go through full VAL/VERA
  - Equipped with a 15000 lb vehicle winch on the front of the vehicle
- Transversal 360-degree ring mount for crew served weapon that is removable
- Tactical lighting system inside and outside of vehicle with blackout capabilities
- Storage space capability (392 cubic ft and 6000 lb) / Lockable compartments
- Free space of 25” x 36” x 52” free of obstruction with 4 tie down points and a doorway at least 25” wide
- 4 power outlets 110 VAC and 4 each 12 VDC
- Vehicle must have run-flat tires and 1 spare tire with lifting system to change tire
- Vehicle must have available space claims for add-on electronic systems
- Upgradeable to provide NBC protection and operate in MOPP 4 conditions
- Equipped with an interior climatic control system to provide heating and cooling / Capable of operating in hot and basic MIL-standard climatic conditions
- Provide external air source capable of providing compressed air with sufficient pressure and volume
- Ignition/Starter switch should be pushbutton vice keyed
- System must survive the INWE of High-Altitude electromagnetic pulse (HEMP)
- Have ability to provide removable ramp and computer workstation terminal

== Vehicle chosen ==
In December 2007, the Army chose the RG-33 family of vehicles, produced by BAE Systems, for its MMPV program. The contract was for up to $2.2 billion in orders, to produce up to 2,500 vehicles through 2015, for Army Engineers and Explosive Ordnance Disposal teams.

The initial order was for nine test vehicles, to be completed between May and August 2008. In April 2008, the Army issued a $132 million production contract to BAE System for 179 vehicles.
