= RG-12 =

Armored personnel carrier

RG-12 'Nyala'
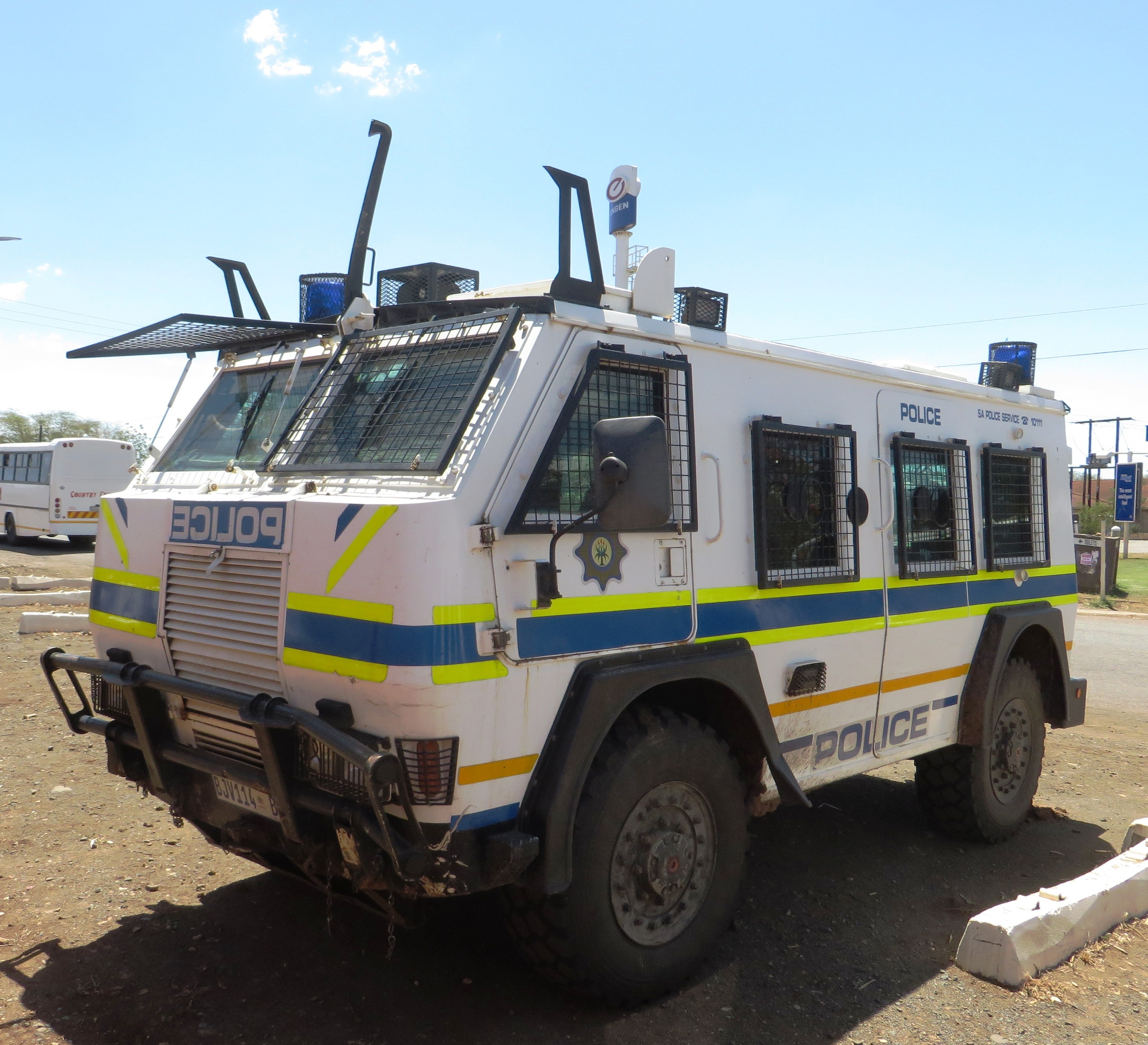
- South African Police Service RG-12
- Type: Armored Personnel Carrier
- Place of origin: South Africa

Production history
- Manufacturer: Land Systems OMC

Specifications
- Mass: 9.2 t
- Length: 5.2 m
- Width: 2.45 m
- Height: 2.64 m
- Crew: 8 to 12
- Engine: Iveco diesel engine
- Suspension: 4x2 and 4×4 wheeled
- Operational range: 1000 km
- Maximum speed: 104 km/h

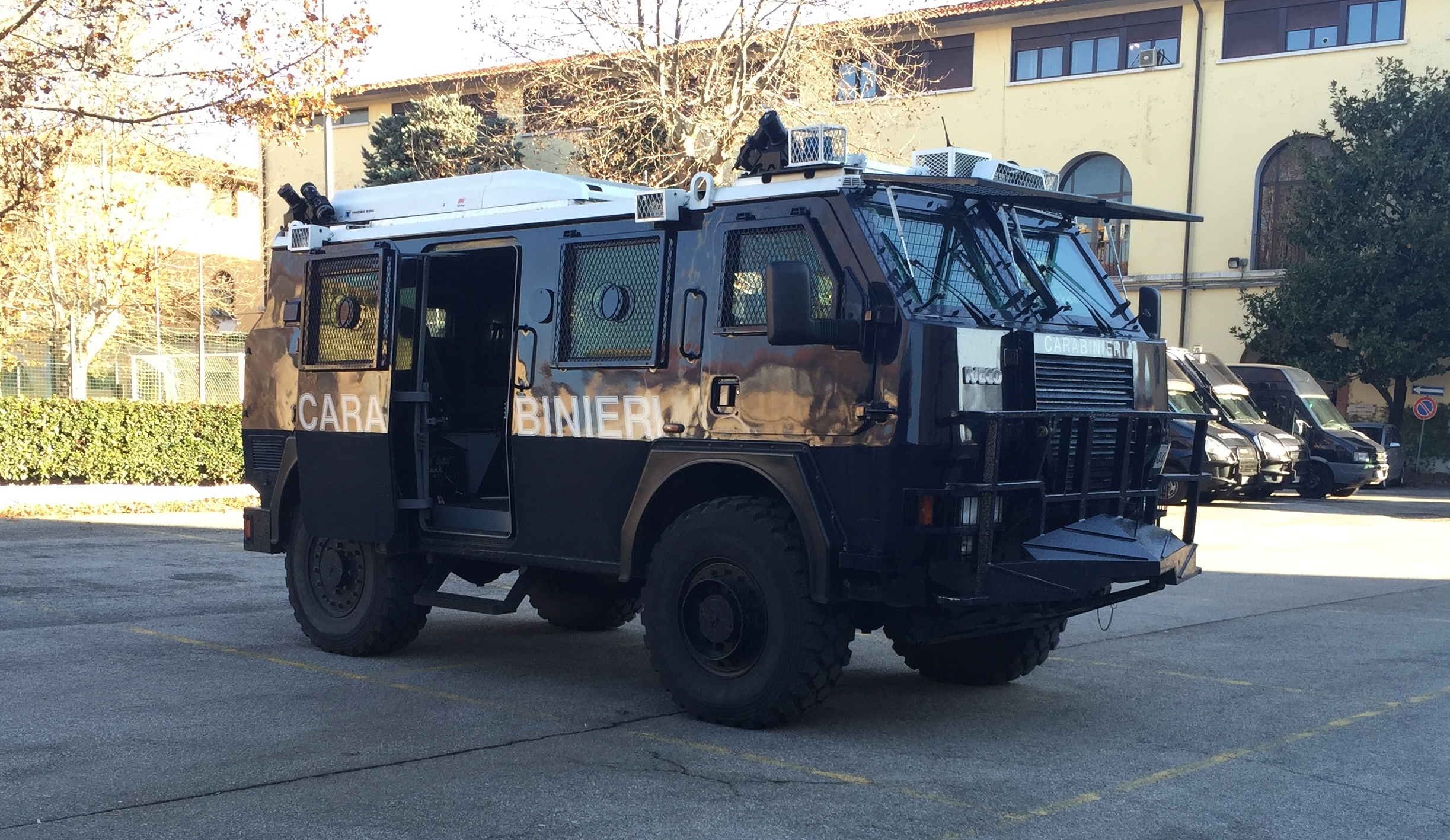
Carabinieri RG-12 in Florence, Italy.

The RG-12 (nicknamed 'Nyala') is a multi-purpose armoured personnel carrier. It has anti-personnel mine, grenade, fire bomb and small arms fire protection that is manufactured by Land Systems OMC (a business unit of BAE Systems) of South Africa, with over 700 being in service globally in more than eight countries.

Originally designed as a police public order vehicle for both urban and rural operations, the RG-12 has been developed to be used in many roles, including as routine internal security vehicle, military APC, bullion carrier, bulk diamond carrier and security vehicle on gold and platinum mines.

== Production history ==
Production started in 1990 by TFM's Defence and Security Division. By 1997, when it was taken over by Reunert Defence OMC, almost 500 were built. When the units where delivered to Dubai's Police 720 units had been built with BAE land systems the largest producer, Drakensberg Truck Manufacturers also produce and some Iveco branded units can be seen with some slight variations on mirrors and spare wheel configuration.

=== Variants ===
- RG-12 Mk1 - original variant with an ADE 366T diesel engine
- RG-12 CAT - variant fitted with a Caterpillar engine (Mercedes-Benz Iveco engines are fitted to the standard RG-12).
- RG-12 Command Vehicle - variant specifically developed for a user in the Middle East.
- RG-12 Mk2 - improved version with an auxiliary power unit driven air conditioning system for effective climate regulation in extreme conditions, provision of a central tyre inflation system enhancing mobility by allowing inflation or deflation of the tyres according to terrain requirements, an anti-skid braking system and various ergonomic modifications to ensure crew comfort.

In North American service, the RG-12 is often fitted with the Mobile Adjustable Ramp System (MARS) made by Patriot3, Inc. out of Fredericksburg, Virginia, for use in aircraft anti-hijack and forced building entry situations. The MARS makes simultaneous multi-storey entry possible and can be used in elevated assaults. The system is fitted onto the roof of the RG-12 and has two hydraulically operated ramps that can move independently.

- IS-V - this internal security from Otokar (Turkey) is very similar to the RG-12.

=== Operators ===
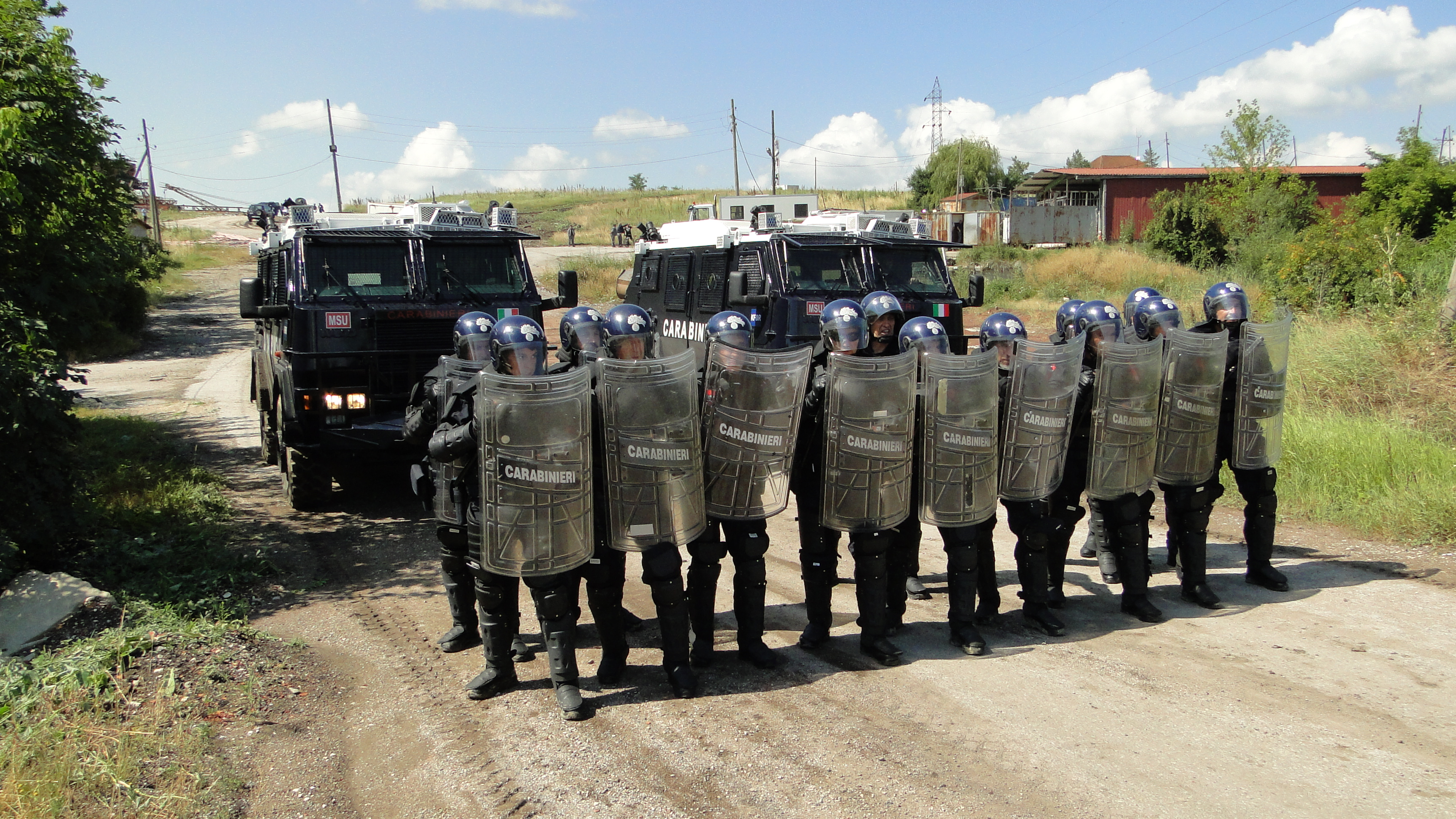
KFOR-MSU Carabinieri with two RG-12s in Kosovo, during an exercise.

- Canada - (Royal Canadian Mounted Police, Calgary Police Service, 2 delivered, London Police Service replaced in 2020)
- Republic of the Congo - Police Nationale Congolaise
- Italy - Carabinieri - 33 delivered.
- Ivory Coast - Police - 3 delivered
- Colombia - National Police of Colombia
- Kuwait
- Jordan
- Malawi - Malawi Police Force
- Mozambique - Mozambique Republic Police
- Saudi Arabia
- South Africa - South African Police Service
- Swaziland - Royal Swaziland Police
- United Arab Emirates - Dubai Police Force (delivered as RG 12 Mk2)
- United States - Port Authority of New York and New Jersey Police Department, 3 delivered, Connecticut State Police 1 delivered.

== Notable appearances in media ==
In the film Avengers: Age of Ultron some RG-12 are used by the South African Police Service in the fight against Hulk.

== See also ==
- Infantry fighting vehicle
- List of AFVs
- Buffel
- Mamba APC
- RCV-9
- RG-19
- RG-31
- RG-32
- RG-33
- RG-34
- RG-35
