= Mamba APC =

South African mine protected personnel carrier

Mamba
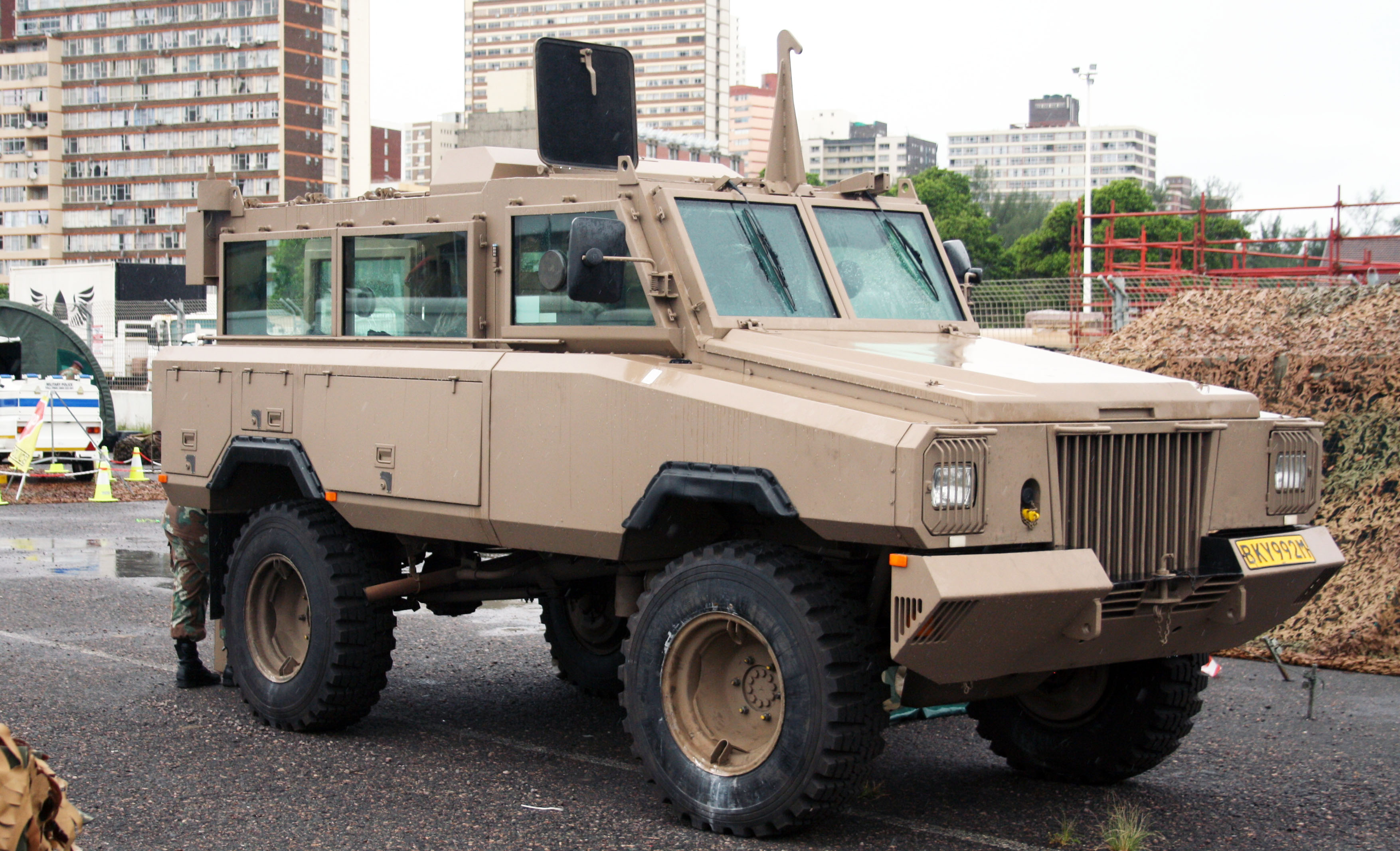
- Mamba Mk2 of the South African National Defence Force (SANDF).
- Type: Infantry mobility vehicle with MRAP capabilities
- Place of origin: South Africa / United Kingdom

Service history
- Used by: See Operators
- Wars: Kosovo War; Somali Civil War; Iraq War; Kivu conflict Russian invasion of Ukraine

Production history
- Designed: 1988
- Manufacturer: Reumech OMC
- Produced: 1990–present
- No. built: ~800
- Variants: See Variants

Specifications
- Mass: 6.45 tonnes (7.11 short tons; 6.35 long tons) (Mk1); 6.8 tonnes (7.5 short tons; 6.7 long tons) (Mk2); 6.5 tonnes (7.2 short tons; 6.4 long tons) (Mk3)
- Length: 5.88 m (19 ft 3 in) (Mk1); 5.46 m (17 ft 11 in) (Mk2, Mk3)
- Width: 2.36 m (7 ft 9 in) (Mk1); 2.2 m (7 ft 3 in) (Mk2, Mk3)
- Height: 2.46 m (8 ft 1 in) (Mk1); 2.49 m (8 ft 2 in) (Mk2, Mk3)
- Crew: 2 (commander, driver) + 9 passengers
- Main armament: 12.7mm Browning M2 machine gun, optional
- Engine: Toyota JO 5C four-cylinder diesel (Mk1); Mercedes-Benz OM352 six-cylinder diesel (Mk2, Mk3); 139 hp (104 kW) at 2,900 rpm (Mk1); 123 hp (92 kW) at 2,800 rpm (Mk2, Mk3)
- Power/weight: 18 hp/tonne (13.4 kW/tonne) (Mk2, Mk3)
- Suspension: Coil spring
- Ground clearance: 0.34 m (Mk1); 0.39m (Mk2, Mk3)
- Fuel capacity: 220 litres (Mk2, Mk3)
- Operational range: 900 km
- Maximum speed: 102 km/h (63 mph)

The Mamba is a South African infantry mobility vehicle designed for internal security purposes. It was developed during the late 1980s to replace the Buffel in service with the South African military and security forces. The first models were built on a 4X2 Toyota Dyna chassis, which was subsequently replaced in production around 1994 by a more reliable Unimog chassis. All marks of the Mamba were designed to be mine-resistant and blastproof.

== Development history ==
=== Mamba Mk1 ===
The South African Army issued a requirement for a new armoured vehicle in 1987 capable of a wide variety of roles, namely border protection and internal security. The Mamba Mk1 was developed the following year and utilised the chassis of a Toyota Dyna 4X2 truck. A number were accepted into service between 1990 and 1994.

=== Subsequent marks ===
After 1994, the Mamba utilised a Unimog truck chassis for better off-road performance and ground clearance. The first units were derived from surplus Buffel vehicles. Its V-shaped hull is designed to deflect a mine blast away from the occupants. It is powered by a 352N Mercedes-Benz 6-cylinder diesel engine. The Mamba entered service in 1995, and is still in use with the South African National Defence Force (SANDF) and several other countries. The SANDF now uses the Mamba Mk2 and Mamba Mk3 versions, with 600 Mk2s upgraded to Mk3 configuration.

The Mamba is 546 centimetres (215 in) in length, 220.5 centimetres (86.8 in) in width, and has a height of 249.5 centimetres (98.2 in). The four-wheeled vehicle can carry up to 10 passengers, excluding the driver. A roof hatch allows a gunner to use the weapon mount, which can be equipped with a 12.7 mm machine gun. A large door at the rear of the vehicle provides access to the passengers and crew. The Mk3 features better ballistic protection over the Mk2 – the latter can withstand impacts from up to 7.62×51mm NATO rounds, while the former is capable of handling 5.56×45mm NATO impacts. The Mk3 is also lighter, more stable, has lower operating costs and comes with an 8-speed transmission compared to the 4-speed transmission of the Mk2. However, the Mk3 has a range of only 650 kilometres (400 mi) whereas the Mk2 has a range of 900 kilometres (560 mi). The Mamba also provides protection against mines of up to 7 kilograms (15 lb). It has four-wheel drive capability, and can achieve a top speed of 102 kilometres per hour (63 mph). Apart from the APC role, the vehicle may also be used as an ambulance, a command vehicle, a VIP transport, or a logistics vehicle. The newest Mamba, the Mk5, is manufactured by N4-Trucks in South Africa, and delivers 240 hp (180 kW) from a water-cooled Iveco engine, a range over 600 km, over 4,500 kg payload, and a B7 ballistic protection versus previous B6 capabilities of the Mk1-Mk3.

== Combat history ==
Mambas have been deployed primarily with peacekeeping missions mounted by the United Nations and the African Union. The Mamba has seen active service with the United Nations Observer Mission in Angola (MONUA), the United Nations Protection Force (UNPROFOR), the United Nations Force Intervention Brigade (FIB), and the British contingent of the Kosovo Force. During the Iraq War, it was widely deployed by private security contractors in Iraq.

== Operators ==
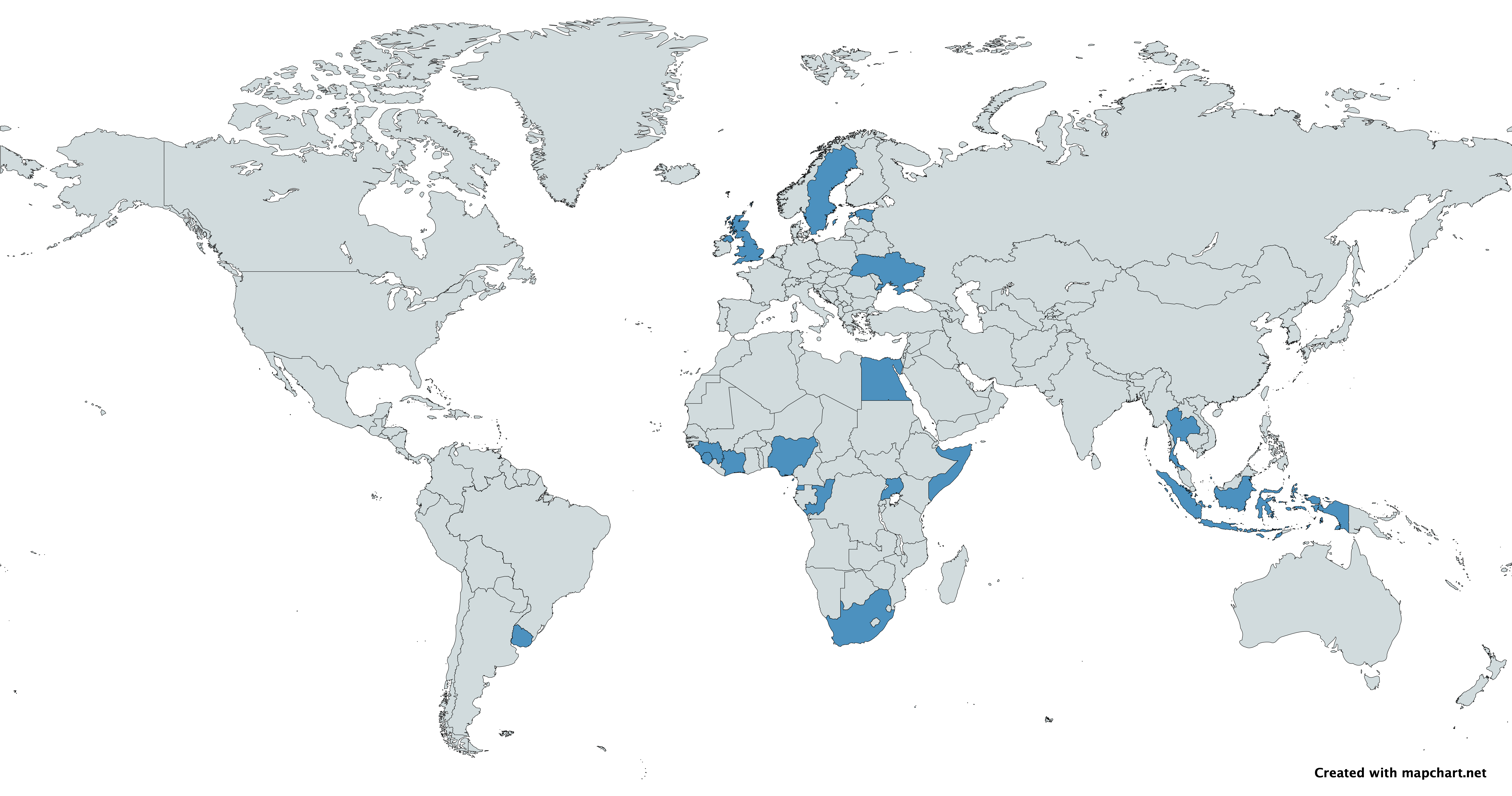
Map with Mamba users in blue

- Republic of the Congo: 18
- Ivory Coast: 10
- Egypt: 14
- Equatorial Guinea: 25
- Estonia: 3 as of 2013; 7 donated to Ukraine in 2022.
- Guinea: 10
- Indonesia: Unknown quantity
- Nigeria: 23
- Sierra Leone: 5
- Somalia: 6
- South Africa
- Sweden: 6
- Thailand: 87
- Uganda: 15
- Ukraine: 7
- United Kingdom: 14
- Uruguay: 14

== Variants and derivatives ==
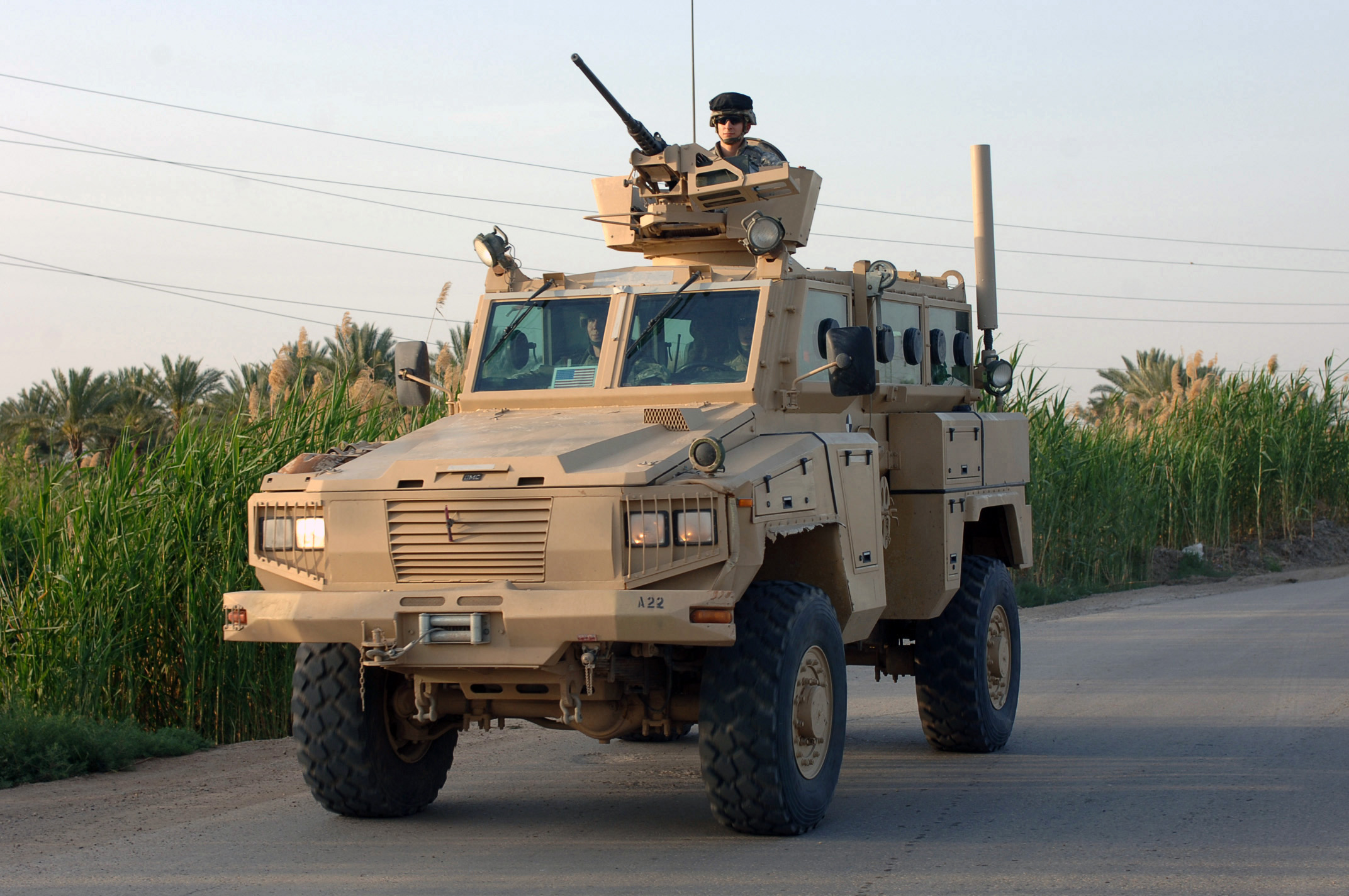
RG-31 Nyala, an APC closely resembling the Mamba.

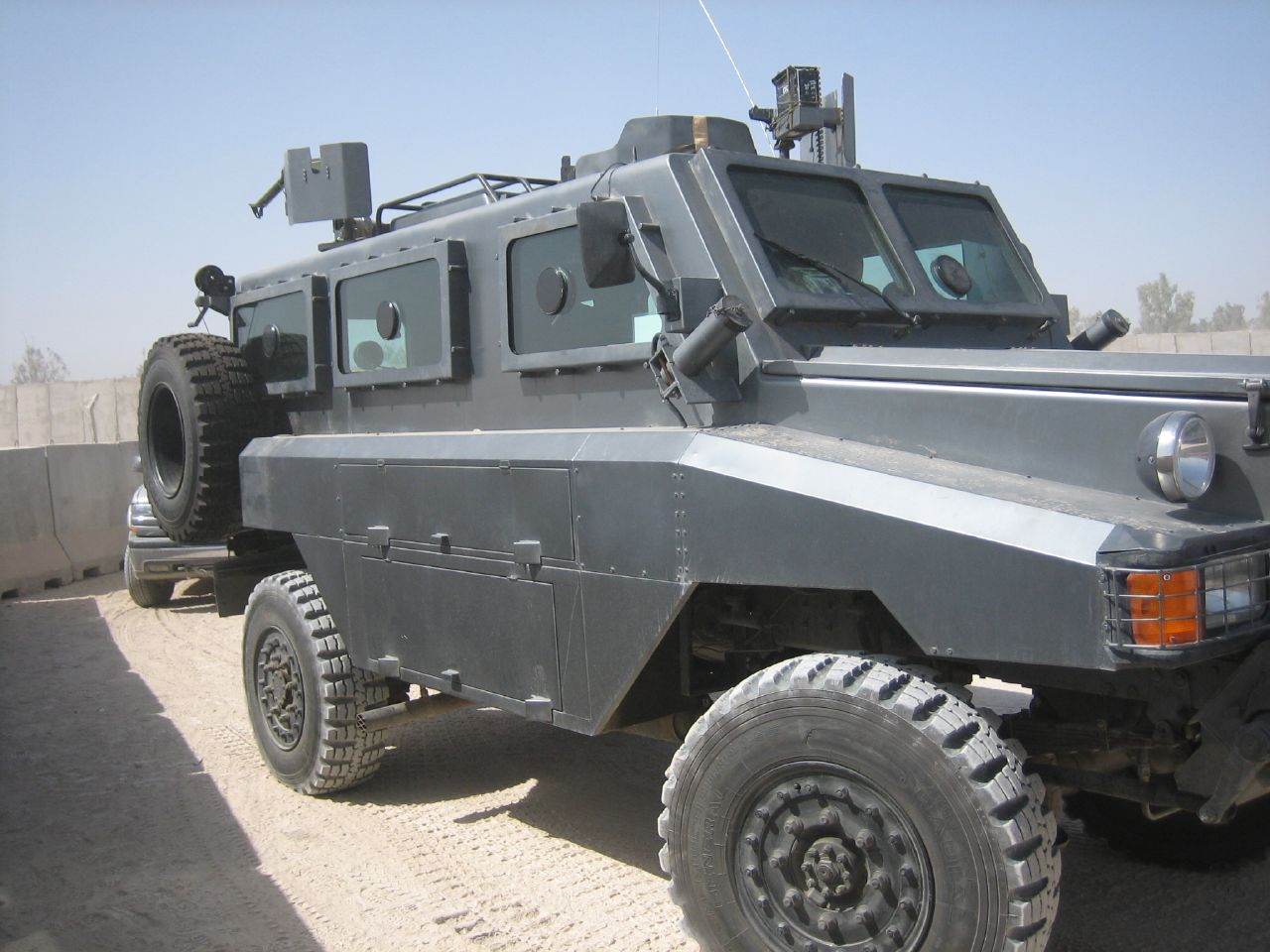
The Reva APC, which was derived from the Mamba design.

Numerous variants of the Mamba have been produced, as well as vehicles derived from it.

- Mamba Mk1 - Original 2x4 (Over 500 built by TFM Industries later becomes Reumech OMC)
  - Springbuck Mk1 - modified version
  - Reva Mk1 - modified version by ICP
  - Puma - modified version with a Toyota Dyna 7-145 powerplant and drivetrain
- Mamba Mk2 - 4x4 (built by Sandock Austral and TFM) Mamba Mk II - Improved production version.
  - Mamba Mk2 EE - Version produced for the Estonian Army
  - Mamba Mk2 SW - Version produced for the Swedish Army
  - Komanche - A short wheeled base (SWB) version which can carry up to 7 troops
  - Sabre - 4 man cab with a cargo area in the rear
  - Alvis 4 - Version produced by Alvis UK for the British Army
  - Alvis 8 - Komanche SWB version produced by Alvis UK for the British Army
  - RG-31 Nyala - redesigned version by TFM
  - Romad - modified version by Sandock Austral)
  - Reva Mk2 - modified version by ICP with Cummins powerplant
  - Springbuck Mk2 - modified version
- Mamba Mk3 - 4x4 version fitted with Mercedes-Benz 312N engine. Built by Alvis OMC
  - Reva Mk3 - modified version by ICP
- Mamba Mk5 - 4x4 fitted with Iveco Euro 3 engine and B7 armor. Built by Osprea Logistics SA
- Mamba Mk7 - 4x4 fitted with Deutz BF6L9l4C Turbo engine and B7 steel and glass; upgrade to Stanag 3- with 0.50-cal protection. Built by Osprea Logistics
  - Mamba Mk7-X - 4x4 fitted with a Deutz BF06M1015C with 408 HP water-cooled engine. STANAG 4a4b blast protection and STANAG 3- ballistic protection. Built by Osprea.

== See also ==
- Mine-resistant ambush protected vehicles
- List of AFVs
- Buffel
- RCV-9
- Reva APC - similar vehicle produced by Integrated Convoy Protection.
- RG-12
- RG-19
- RG-31
- RG-32
- RG-33
- RG-34
- RG-35
