= RG-32 Scout =

RG-32M
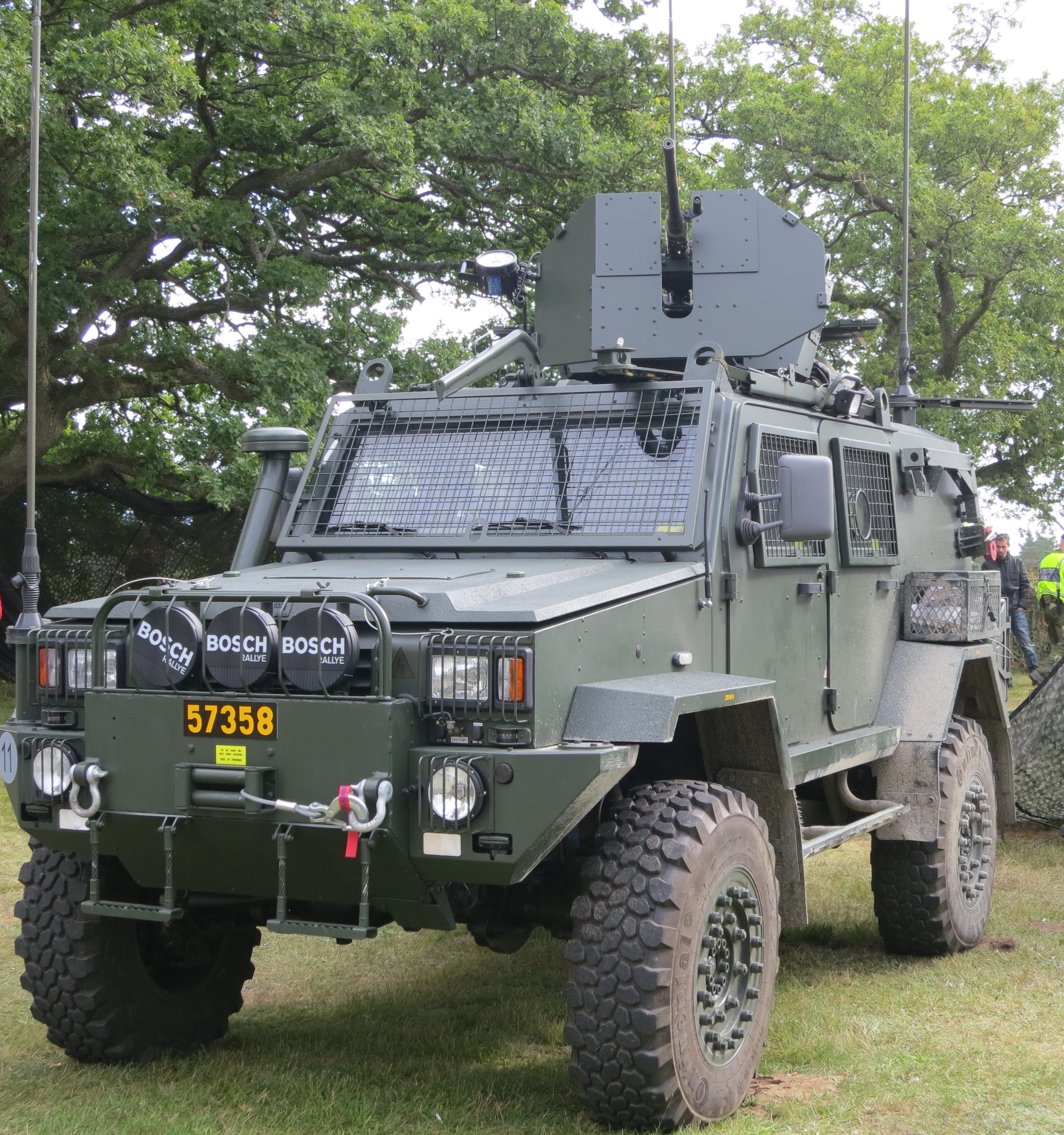
- Place of origin: South Africa

Service history
- In service: 2003–present

Production history
- Designer: BAE Systems Land Systems South Africa (formerly Land Systems OMC)
- Produced: 2002-present
- Variants: Standard, Full Armour

Specifications
- Mass: 9.5 t
- Length: 4.97 m (16.31 ft)
- Width: 2.06 m (6.76 ft)
- Height: 2.05 m (6.73 ft)
- Crew: 1+4
- Engine: Detroit Diesel or VM Motori or Steyr M16; 181 HP
- Transmission: Five speed automatic
- Suspension: Rigid portal axles with coil springs and telescopic shock absorbers on front and rear
- Maximum speed: 105 km/h

The RG-32 Scout is a family of mine-resistant 4×4 light armoured vehicles made by BAE Systems Land Systems South Africa (formerly Land Systems OMC) in South Africa. It is based on the RG-31, which is already deployed worldwide with peace-keeping, security and combat forces. The combat weight of the vehicle is about 7,300 kg and it has the capacity to carry a crew of 5 to 7. The vehicle crew is protected against 5.56×45mm NATO ball ammunition, grenades, firebombs, anti-personnel mines and side blasts. The five-seat version also offers protection against anti-tank mines and side blasts. Up to two RG-32Ms can be transported in a C-130 cargo aircraft.

The latest development of this vehicle is the RG-32M Galten (Swedish for "The Boar" or "The Hog"). The RG-32M has undergone "winterisation" modifications in Sweden; the RG-32M has been used in environments ranging from 49 °C (120 °F) in the deserts of Africa and the Middle East to −35 °C (-31 °F) in parts of Sweden.

== Production history ==
=== Variants ===
- RG-32M Standard (Driver + 4)
- RG-32M Full armour (Driver + 8)
- RG-32M LTV Light Tactical Vehicle

== Operators ==
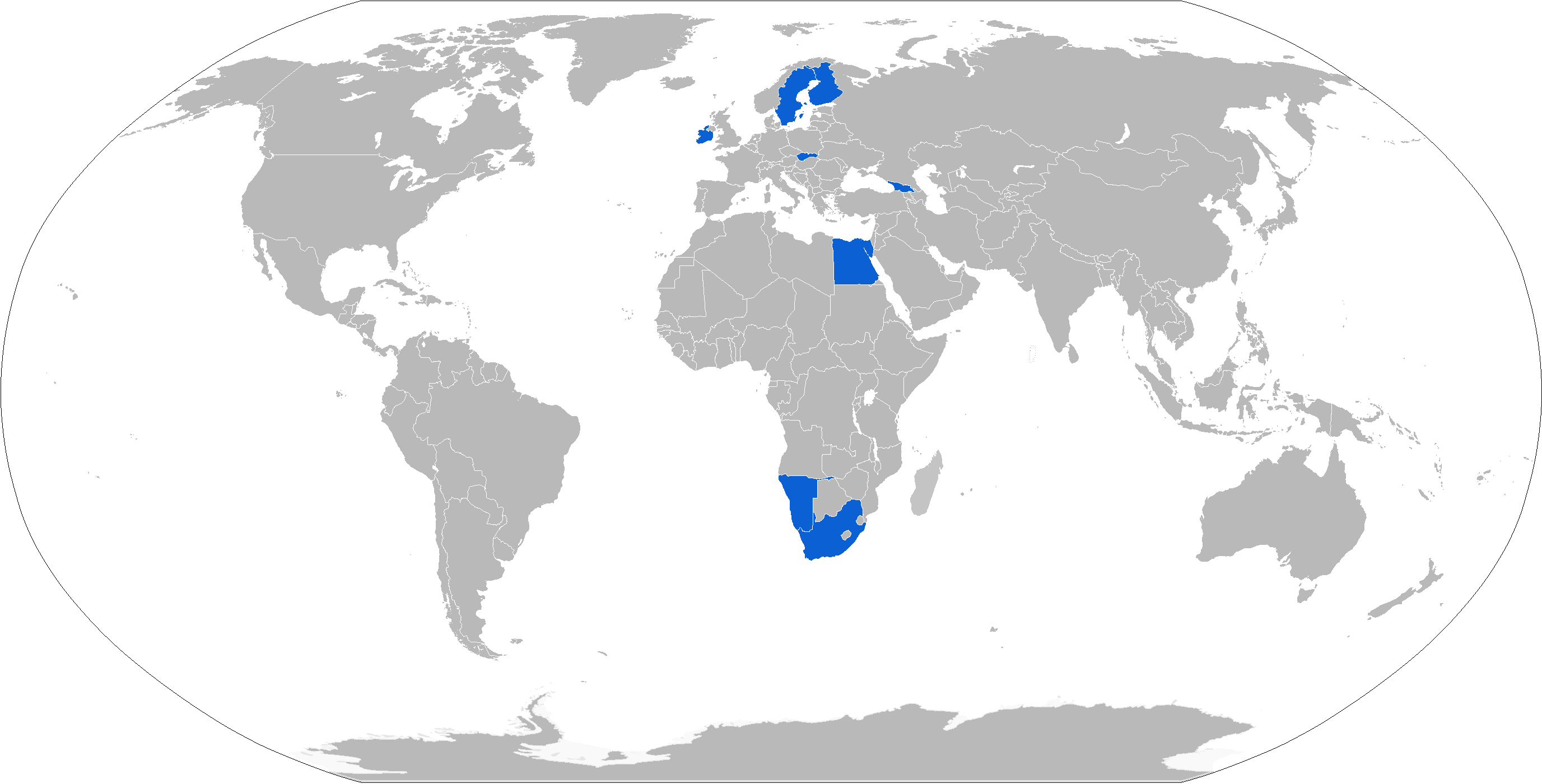
Map with RG-32 operators in blue

More than 800 RG-32 vehicles are in service worldwide, including with:

=== Current operators ===
- Egypt — 180 vehicles.
- Finland — 74 To be replaced by Sisu GTP in the near future.
- Georgia
- Namibia
- Slovakia — 7 are in service as a part of the MOKYS communication system. Originally planned as a potential replacement for ageing fleet of BRDM-2 that were in service as of 2017.
- South Africa-400
- Sweden — 380
- United Nations

=== Civilian operators ===
- United States Used by the Federal Bureau of Investigation SWAT Teams, and by various local police forces

=== Former operators ===
- Ireland — 27 RG Outriders purchased in 2010. The vehicles saw limited usage due to poor reliability, and were withdrawn from service in 2024, and placed into storage in 2026. The vehicles were later scrapped after Ukraine rejected an offer from the Irish government to supply the vehicles to the Ukrainian military.

== See also ==
- Buffel
- Casspir
- Mamba APC
- RCV-9
- RG-12
- RG-19
- RG-31
- RG-33
- RG-34
- RG-35
