= Land Systems OMC =

South African armoured vehicle producer

Land Systems OMC is a South African company that produces a range of armoured vehicles which have been successfully exported and are in service with, amongst others, the U.S., Canadian and South African militaries. It is a division of Denel SOC LTD, located in Benoni, Gauteng.

The OMC segment of the name is the initialism under which the Olifant Manufacturing Co. of South Africa was most commonly known during its existence. The original company was established specifically for the task of creating the Olifant tank for the South African Army.

== Ownership ==
=== Reunert ===
OMC's existence as an independent company was short-lived however, and early into its life it was taken over by Reunert, which subsequently turned it into a division called Reumech OMC. It was under this name that OMC saw its most prolific level of vehicle development, as combat operations during the Angolan Bush War necessitated a greater need for vehicle systems capable of being integrated with the very swift, flexible, operational style of the South African Defence Force. In 1997, Reunert inherited TFM Industries and its respective designs.

Vehicles manufactured by the company during this period include the Rooikat and Eland armoured cars and the 6x6 chassis used by the G6 howitzer, in addition to South Africa's highly successful Okapi, Mamba, and Casspir MRAP armoured personnel carriers.

=== Vickers ===
Following South Africa's re admittance to the international arena following democratic elections in 1994, a number of foreign defence industry companies expressed significant interest in purchasing the company. Eventually it was Britain's Vickers plc that won, purchasing the company and renaming it Vickers OMC.

=== Alvis ===
This continued until Alvis, also of Britain, purchased Vickers' defence division, including OMC. Continuing with tradition, Alvis renamed the company to Alvis OMC.

=== BAE Systems ===
In 2004, BAE Systems purchased the military vehicle division of Alvis. OMC then became part of BAE Systems' Land Systems, again undergoing a name change to Land Systems OMC and later to BAE Systems Land Systems South Africa.

=== Denel SOC LTD ===
In April 2015, state-owned defence conglomerate Denel completed the acquisition of Land Systems South Africa (LSSA) from BAE Systems and DGD Technologies. Denel took over BAE's 75% stake for R641 million ($53 million). Full ownership cost Denel R855 million as the purchase included DGD Technologies' 25% share.

== Vehicles ==
=== Armoured Personnel Carriers (APC) ===
OMC vehicles were developed for and successfully deployed in Angola and Namibia during the South African Border War. This harsh environment demanded good mobility as well as protection against anti-tank mines. The Casspir APC pioneered technology such as specially welded and shaped hulls to provide protection against mines.

OMC's modern armoured personnel carriers are popular with most international peace keeping forces, because of the level of mine-protection offered as well as the ease of maintenance and manoeuvrability of wheeled APCs.

Countries and organizations using these vehicles include South Africa, Canada, the United Nations, United States, Sweden and Blackwater Security amongst others.

- Casspir, 4x4 wheeled APC, first version introduced in the 1980s.
- Mamba, 4x4 wheeled APC, crew of 12.
- RG-12, aimed at riot control, 4 wheel drive, crew of 12.
- RG-31 Nyala, 4x4 wheeled APC, crew of 10 (driver + nine).
- RG-32 Scout, 4x4 wheeled APC, crew of 5.
- RG Outrider, 4x4 wheeled APC, crew of 4.
- RG-33, 4x4 or 6x6 wheeled APC.
- RG-34. 4x4 wheeled APC, crew of 5.
- Pinzgauer 4x4 and 6x6 all terrain vehicles
- Iklwa, modernised version of the Ratel infantry fighting vehicle.

=== Rapid deployment vehicle ===
- Wasp rapid deployment vehicle, air deployable light 4x4 vehicle for airborne and special forces.

=== Armoured fighting vehicle (AFV) ===
- Rooikat, 8 wheeled AFV armed with a 76 mm gun (In service with the SA Army) a version with a 105 mm gun is also available.

=== Self-propelled howitzer ===
- G6 Howitzer, 6 wheeled 155 mm self-propelled artillery, Land Systems OMC makes the base vehicle while the gun and turret is built by Denel Land Systems.

=== Main Battle Tank ===
Tank Technology Demonstrator (TTD), The TTD was a next generation Main Battle Tank that OMC helped develop, but it never got past prototype stage.
