= John Reunert =

South African cricketer

Personal information
- Full name: John Reunert
- Born: 1 April 1886; Johannesburg, South African Republic
- Died: 25 July 1946 (aged 60); Johannesburg, Transvaal, South Africa
- Batting: Left-handed
- Bowling: Left-arm fast
- Relatives: Clive Reunert (brother)

Domestic team information
- Years: Team
- 1908: Cambridge University

Career statistics
Competition	First-class
Matches	5
Runs scored	65
Batting average	8.12
100s/50s	–/–
Top score	19
Balls bowled	667
Wickets	9
Bowling average	43.66
5 wickets in innings	1
10 wickets in match	–
Best bowling	5/100
Catches/stumpings	3/–
- Source: Cricinfo, 25 January 2022

John Reunert (1 April 1886 — 25 July 1946) was a South African first-class cricketer.

The son of Theodore Reunert, he was born in the Johannesburg neighbourhood of Hillbrow in April 1886. Along with his brother, Clive, who was one year his junior, Reunert was sent to England to be educated at Harrow School. He played for the school cricket team in 1904 and 1905, where he headed the batting and bowling averages in 1905. Wisden said of his innings of 92 against Eton at Lord's in 1905, which nearly won Harrow the match, "not often at Lord's has a schoolboy played a pluckier or more daring innings". In addition to playing cricket at Harrow, he also played football for Harrow eleven in 1903 and 1904. From Harrow he matriculated to Pembroke College at the University of Cambridge. A member of the Cambridge University Cricket Club, Reunert made five appearances in first-class cricket for the club in 1908 against the Gentlemen of England and four first-class counties. In a match against Sussex, he played alongside his brother in the Cambridge team. Described by Wisden as a "fast bowler and hard-hitting left-hand batsman", he scored 65 runs with a highest score of 19, while with the ball he took 9 wickets at an average of 43.66; Five of these wickets came in a single innings against Lancashire. He returned to South Africa after graduating from Cambridge, where he played no further cricket of note. Reunert died at Johannesburg in July 1946.
