= Clive Reunert =

South African cricketer and barrister

Personal information
- Full name: Clive Reunert
- Born: 7 December 1887; Johannesburg, South African Republic
- Died: 11 April 1953 (aged 65); Johannesburg, Transvaal, South Africa
- Batting: Unknown
- Bowling: Unknown
- Relatives: John Reunert (brother)

Domestic team information
- Years: Team
- 1908: Cambridge University

Career statistics
Competition	First-class
Matches	3
Runs scored	60
Batting average	12.00
100s/50s	–/–
Top score	28*
Balls bowled	264
Wickets	4
Bowling average	34.50
5 wickets in innings	–
10 wickets in match	–
Best bowling	3/89
Catches/stumpings	1/–
- Source: Cricinfo, 24 January 2022

Clive Reunert (7 December 1887 – 11 April 1953) was a South African first-class cricketer and barrister.

== Biography ==
The son of Theodore Reunert, he was born in the Johannesburg neighbourhood of Hillbrow in December 1887. Along with his brother, John, who was one year his senior, Reunert was sent to England to be educated at Harrow School. He played for the school cricket team while at Harrow, but in his final year he missed out on playing in the Harrow v Eton match of 1906 at Lord's due to a fractured finger and was replaced in the Harrow team by Michael Falcon. From Harrow he matriculated to Trinity College at the University of Cambridge. A member of the Cambridge University Cricket Club, Reunert made three appearances in first-class cricket for the club in 1908 against Yorkshire, Kent, and Sussex; in the match against Sussex, he played alongside his brother in the Cambridge team. In three first-class matches, he scored 60 runs with a highest score of 28 not out, while with the ball he took 4 wickets with best figures of 3 for 89. Reunert became a barrister after graduating from Cambridge, and was a member of the Inner Temple based at Cannon Street in 1911. He later returned to South Africa, where he died at Johannesburg in April 1953.
