= Okapi MPV =

Okapi
- Type: Mine Protected Vehicle
- Place of origin: South Africa

Production history
- Manufacturer: Vickers OMC

Specifications
- Mass: 18 t
- Length: 7.117 m
- Width: 2.48 m
- Height: 3.3 m
- Suspension: 6×6 wheeled
- Operational range: 900 km (road); 400 km (off-road)
- Maximum speed: 100 km/h

The Okapi is a 6×6 mine-protected vehicle (MPV) which can be configured for use in various roles: command and control, fire control post or specialized anti-mine equipment carrier. They were built by Vickers OMC and, in 2001, some were upgraded with new Grintek electronic warfare systems.

== Production history ==
=== Variants ===
- Command and control
- Fire control
- Biological detection
- Electronic warfare

=== Operators ===
- South Africa
