= RG-31 Nyala =

RG-31 Mk3A
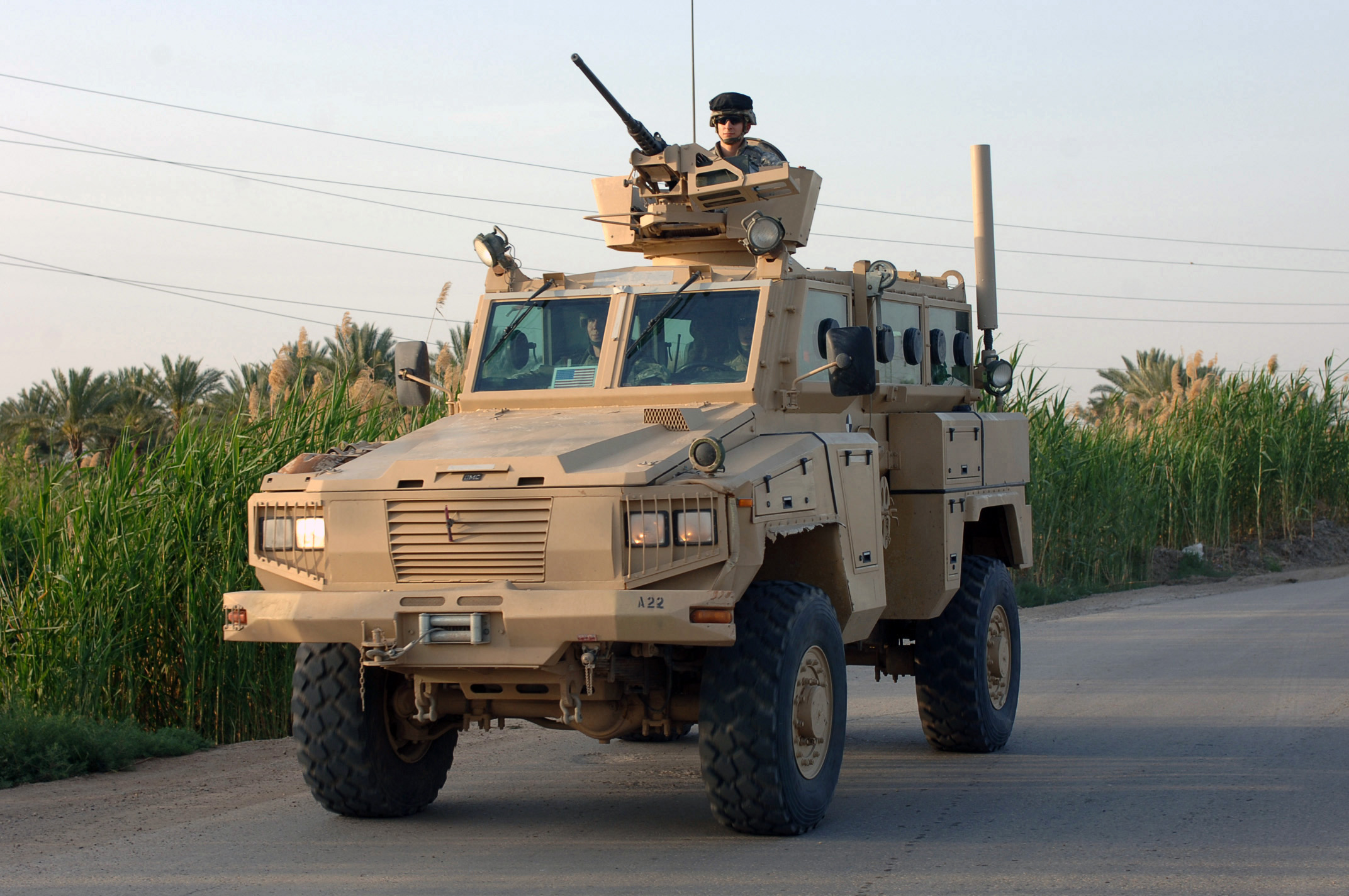
- RG-31 Charger
- Type: Mine-Resistant Ambush Protected Vehicle
- Place of origin: South Africa

Production history
- Designer: BAE Systems Land Systems OMC

Specifications
- Mass: 7.28 t
- Length: 6.40 m (21 ft)
- Width: 2.47 m (8.1 ft)
- Height: 2.63 m (8.63 ft)
- Crew: 2+6
- Main armament: Varies weapons such as optional 12.7mm M2 Browning machine gun by weapons mount
- Engine: Option 1: Daimler-Benz OM 352A, 6-cylinder diesel, 123 hp Option 2: Iveco Tector F4AE0681D diesel Option 3: Detroit Diesel; Option 4: Cummins 6.7L QSB, 6-cylinder diesel, 275 hp Option 5: Weichai WD615
- Suspension: 4×4-wheeled
- Operational range: 900 km (559 mi)
- Maximum speed: 100 km/h (62 mph)

The RG-31 Nyala is a 4×4 multi-purpose Mine-Resistant Ambush Protected Vehicle manufactured in South Africa by Land Systems OMC (a division of Denel SOC LTD), located in Benoni, South Africa and in Turkey by FNSS Defence Systems. It is based on the Mamba APC of TFM Industries.

The RG-31 has become the multi-purpose vehicle of choice of the UN and other peacekeeping and security forces. It is finding favour with non-governmental organisations requiring a vehicle with a non-aggressive appearance to protect their personnel against land mines.

== Design ==
The RG-31 is based on a UNIMOG chassis. It is built from a V-shaped all-steel welded armor monocoque hull and high suspension, typical of South African mine protected vehicles, providing excellent small-arms and mine blast protection. The vehicle is designed to resist a blast equivalent to two TM-57 anti-tank mines detonating simultaneously. The RG-31 is classified by the United States Department of Defense as a category 1 Mine Resistant Ambush Protected (MRAP) vehicle.

The vehicle accommodates a crew ranging from 5 to 10 depending on mission needs, depending on model. Dismounting is provided via a large air actuated rear door and two front doors, also air actuated.

In July 2016, the Letterkenny Army Depot in Pennsylvania rolled out the latest variant of the RG-31, with improvements including an engine upgrade from 275 to 300 hp, a transmission upgrade, independent suspension, 360-degree spotlights for night visibility, and an armored gunner's hatch. The depot is scheduled to produce 929 improved RG-31s through 2020.

== Production history ==
=== Variants ===
Variants come in either an armoured personnel carrier (APC) or utility vehicle (cargo) configuration.

- RG-31 Mk3A – based on Mamba APC
- RG-31 Mk5
- RG-31 Mk5E – An extended Mk5 with larger passenger/cargo capacity and superior blast and ballistic protection.
- RG-31 Mk5EHM – An extended GVW version of Mk5E
- RG-31 Mk5LHM – Pick-Op version of Mk5E
- RG-31 Mk5 Ambulance
- RG-31 Mk6E – Enhanced crew protection
- RG-31 Charger – US Army version of the Mk3 with a Detroit Diesel engine and Mk5 with a Cummins engine
- RG-31M – features a military wiring harness, central tire inflation and several other new characteristics. This vehicle has a crew of 5.
- RG-31 Agrab; Mortar carrier version with SRAMS (Super Rapid Advanced Mortar System).

== Operators ==
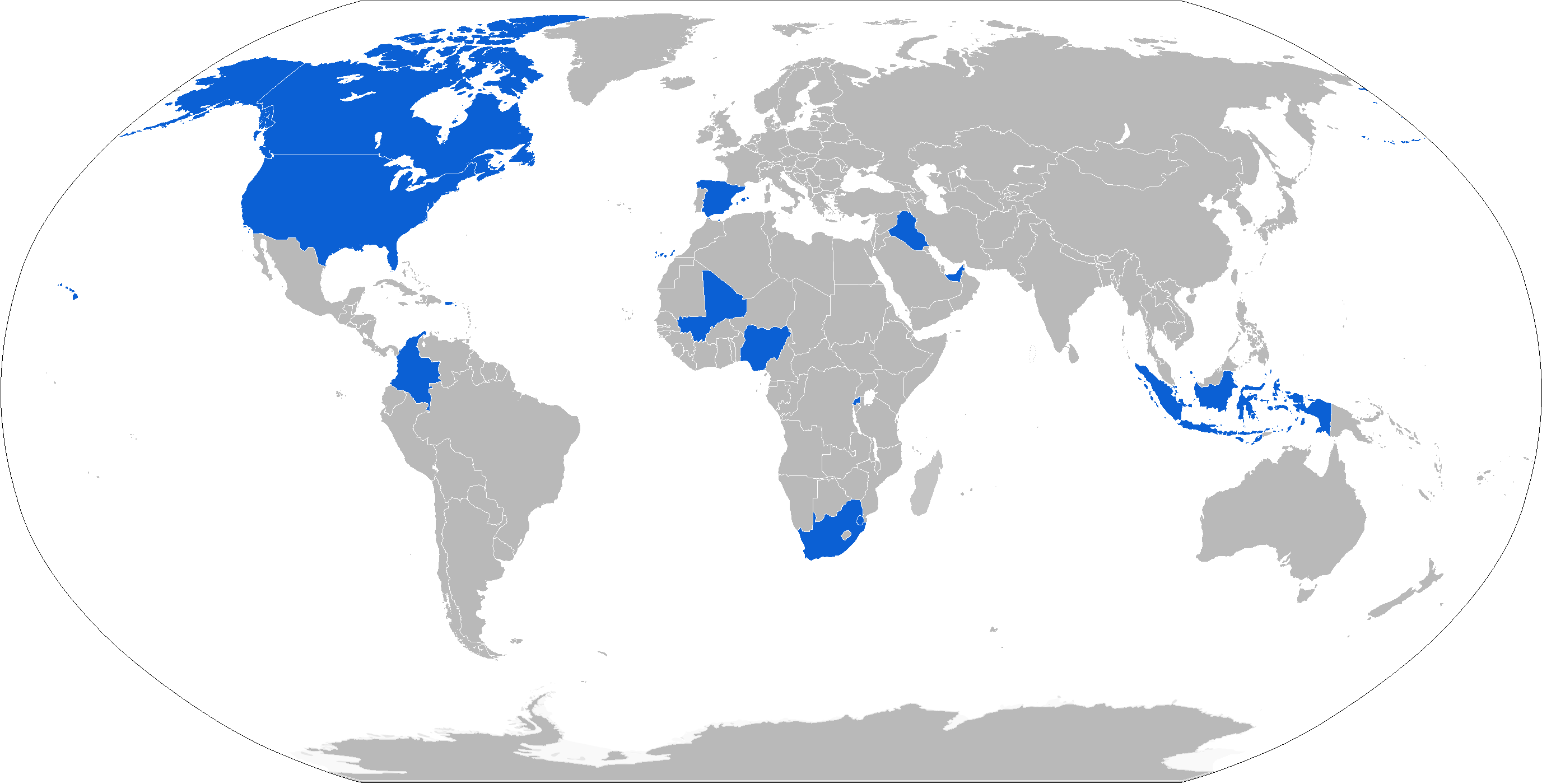
Map with RG-31 operators in blue

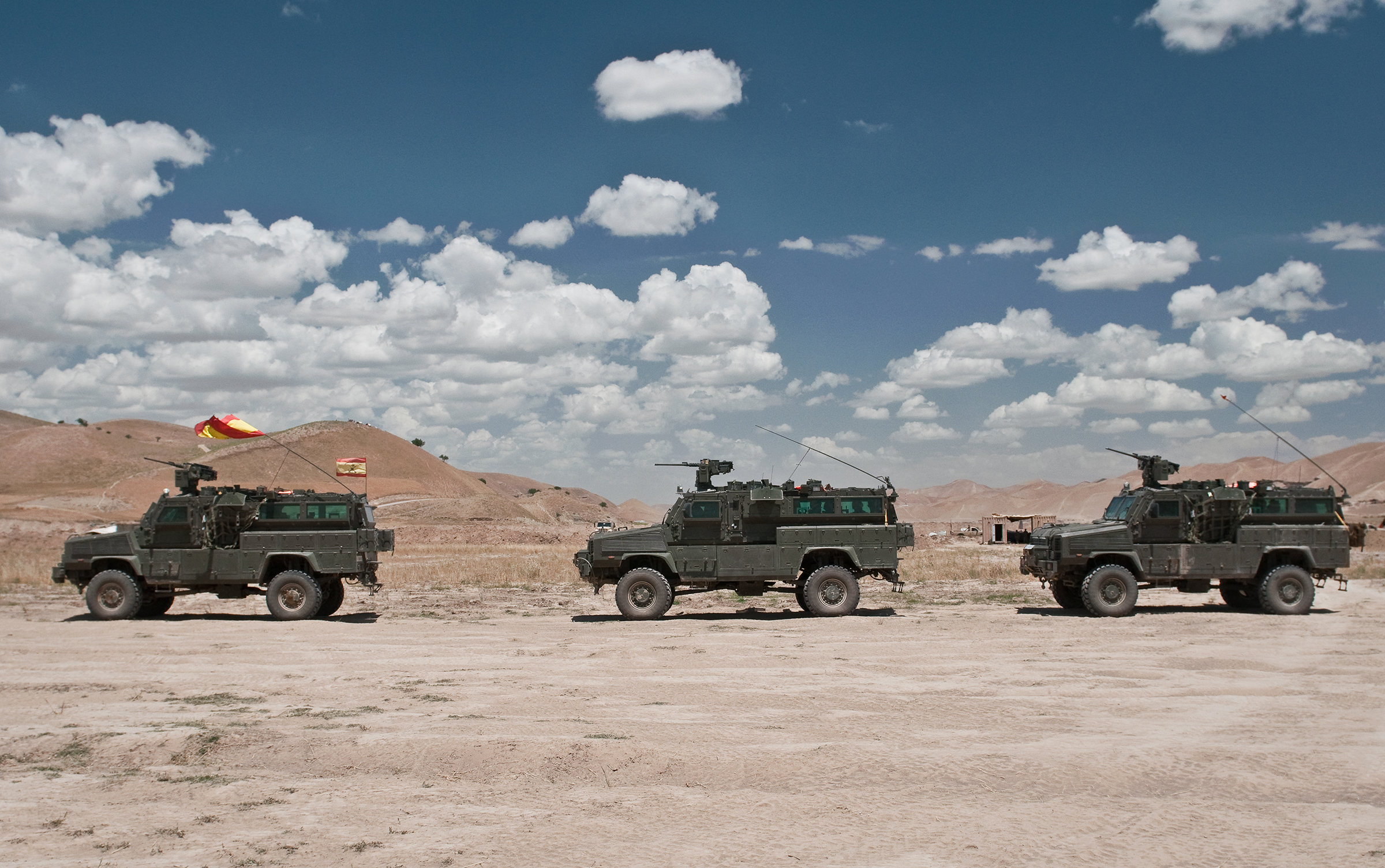
Spanish RG-31 Nyala prepare to depart Forward Operating Base Bernardo de Galvez for a patrol through the town of Sang Atesh, Afghanistan.

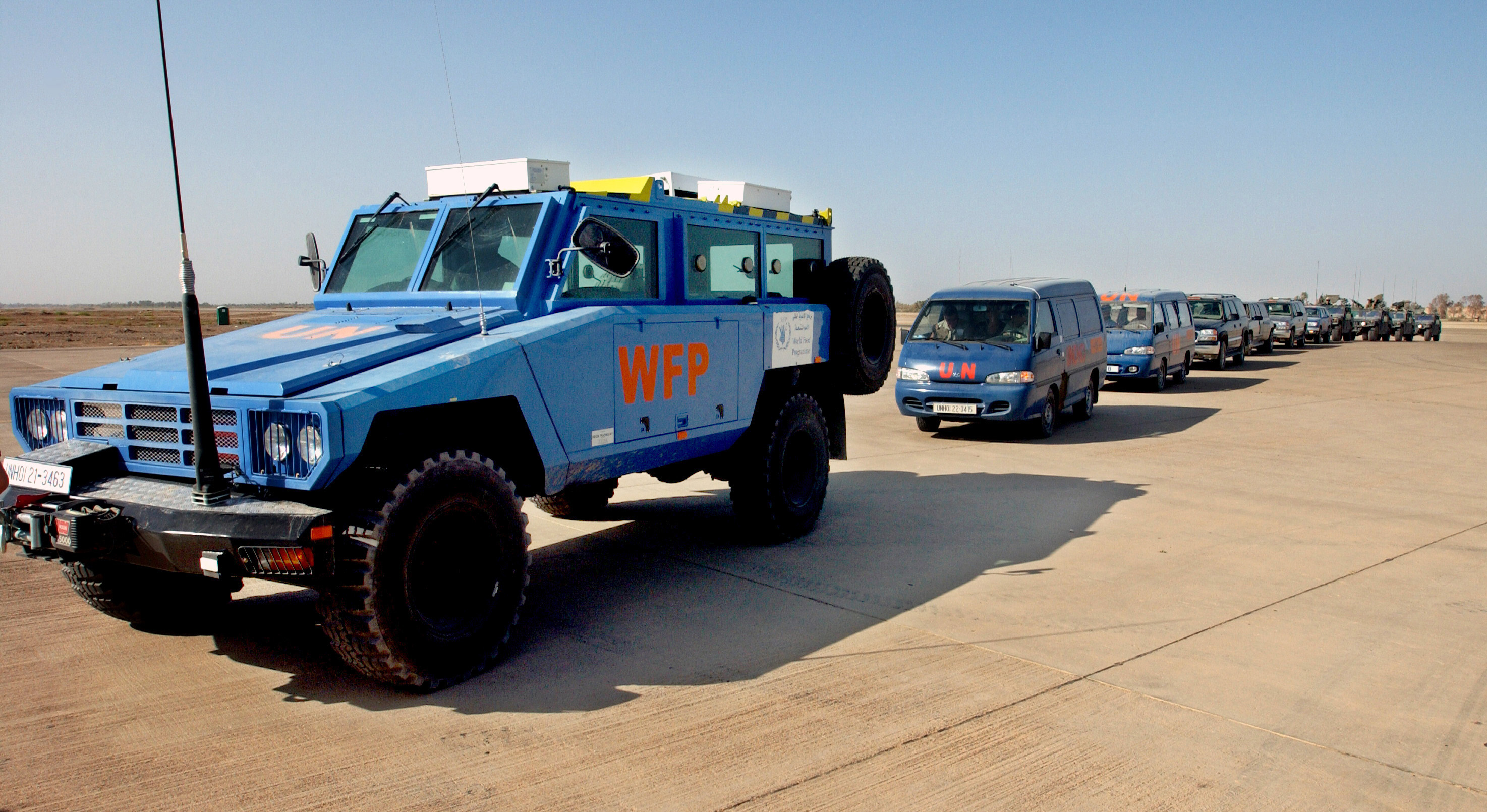
A UN RG-31 in Iraq.

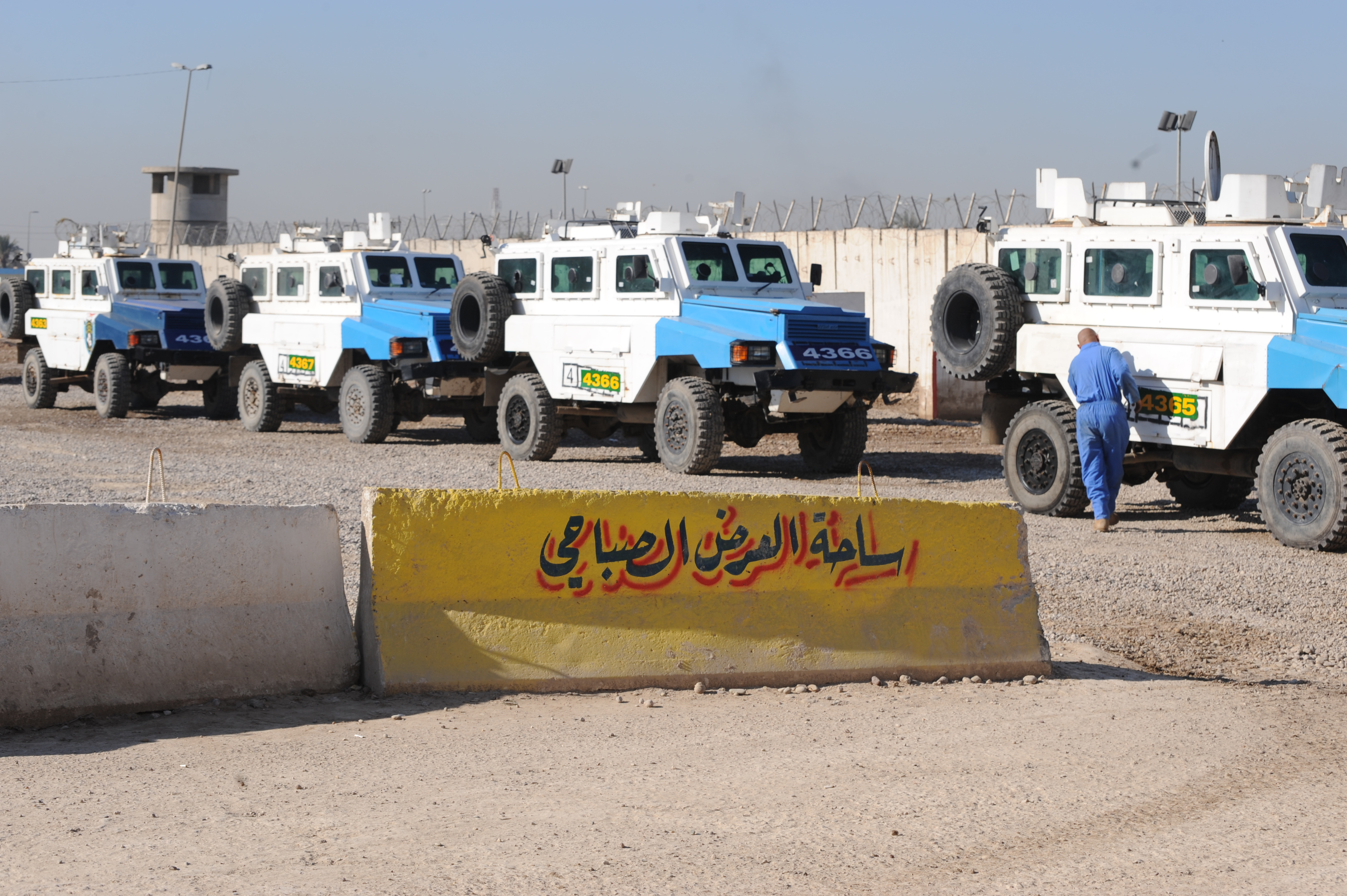
Iraqi National Police armored vehicles line up for a convoy at Joint Security Station Beladiyat.

- Burundi:
  - Burundi Army
    - 12x RG-31 Nyala
- Canada:
  - Canadian Forces
    - 75 RG-31 Mk3 with Protector (RWS) Remote Weapon Station; replaced by Textron Tactical Armoured Patrol Vehicle
  - London Police Service
    - 1x RG-31 Mk3A, used by the Emergency Response Team (replaced sometime around 2020 due to maintenance costs and was sold to Stratford Police Service)
  - Durham Regional Police Service
    - 1x RG-31 Mk3A, Tactical Rescue Vehicle donated by General Dynamics to the Tactical Response Unit
- Colombia:
  - National Army of Colombia
    - 4× RG-31 Nyala
- Spain: 150× RG-31 Mk5E Nyala with Samson remote Weapon Station (+ option for 30 more) already deployed in Lebanon and Afghanistan.
- Mali: 5× RG-31 Nyala
- Nigeria: 1× RG-31 Nyala
- Indonesia
- Iraq
- South Africa
- Rwanda: 76× RG-31 Nyala
- Senegal
- Somalia
- Eswatini: 7× RG-31 Nyala Mk5E, currently used by the Umbutfo Eswatini Defence Force (UEDF).
- United Arab Emirates: 253× customized RG-31 Mk5
- United Nations: 30× RG-31 Nyala
- United States:
  - US SOCOM
    - 50× Mk5A1S
  - US Army
    - 148× RG-31 Mk3 Charger,
    - 257× Mk5A1
    - 111× Mk5E
  - USMC
    - 12× Mk5A's (MRAP Cat I)
    - 1,385× Mk5E's (MRAP Cat II)
  - Academi
- Ukraine: 1 RG-31 Nyala in a combat ambulance configuration was provided to Ukraine by Spain as military aid.

== Combat history ==
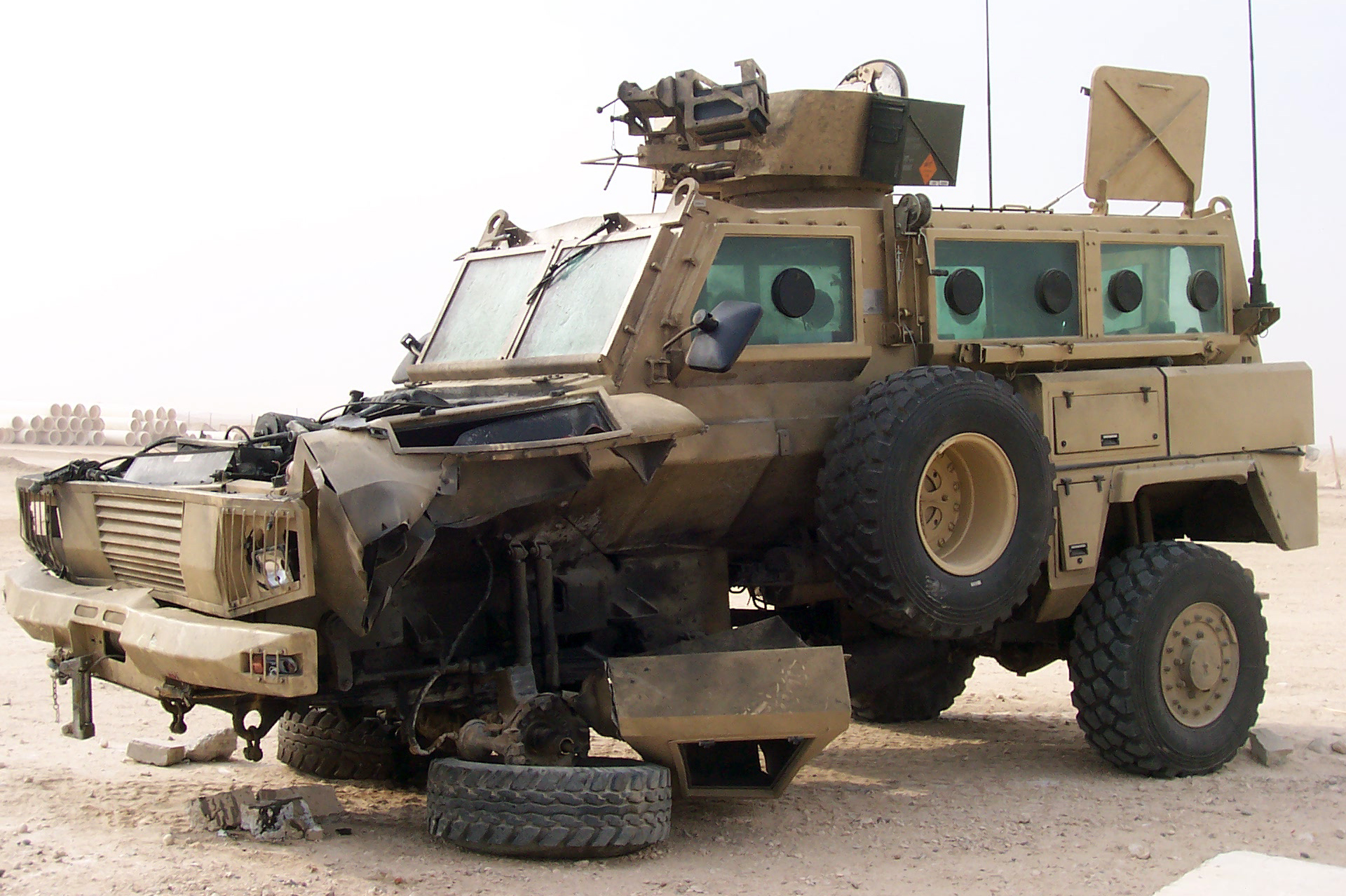
RG-31 Nyala damaged by a mine

RG-31 after getting hit by an IED in Iraq in 2007. The explosion tore the vehicle in two. The crew survived, but they were severely wounded.

- Afghanistan – Canada, (including 5 leased to Netherlands) (ISAF), United States, and Spain
- Bosnia and Herzegovina – UNPROFOR
- Ethiopia / Eritrea – Canada
- Georgia –- UN
- Iraq – United States
- Colombian Armed Conflict
- Ivorian Civil War
- Ivory Coast – UNOCI
- Kosovo – KFOR
- Lebanon – UNIFIL
- Uganda - Uganda People's Defence Forces
- Yemen - United Arab Emirates as part of the Saudi Arabian-led intervention in Yemen
- Mali - MINUSMA
- Syria - UNDOF, later captured by rebel groups, eventually captured by Syrian Army

== See also ==
Other wheeled APCs and IFVs developed in South Africa

- Buffel
- Casspir
- Mamba APC
- Ratel IFV
- RCV-9
- RG-12
- RG-19
- RG-32
- RG-33
- RG-34
- RG-35

General

- Infantry Mobility Vehicle
- MRAP
- List of modern armoured fighting vehicles
