= RG-33 =

RG-33 (standard four wheel variant)
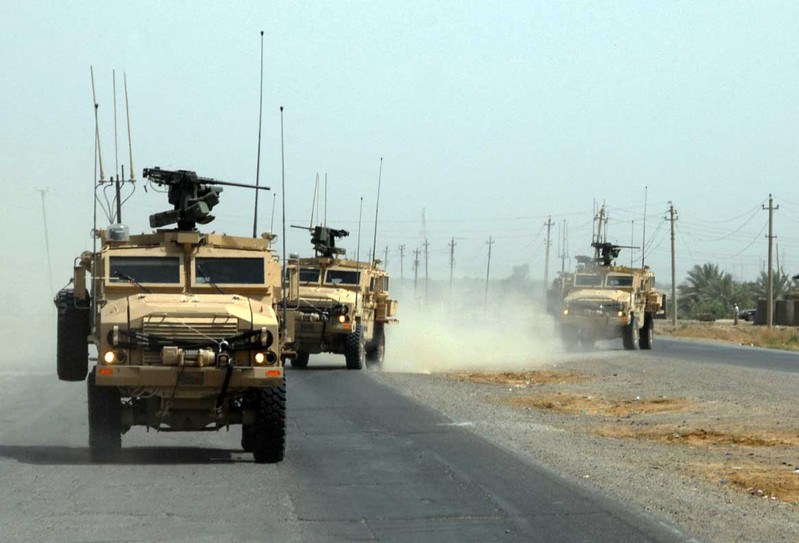
- Type: Infantry mobility vehicle with MRAP capabilities
- Place of origin: South Africa

Service history
- In service: 2007 – present
- Used by: United States Army; United States Marine Corps; Croatian Army
- Wars: Global War on Terrorism

Production history
- Designer: Land Systems OMC
- Manufacturer: BAE Systems Land Systems South Africa
- Unit cost: $300,000
- Variants: RG-33 (4x4)

Specifications
- Length: 22.1 feet (6,700 mm)
- Width: 8 feet (2,400 mm)
- Height: 9.5 feet (2,900 mm)
- Crew: 2 + 12 crew
- Armor: monocoque v-hull
- Main armament: Optional armored glass turret or remote weapon station
- Engine: Cummins 400 I6 Diesel; 400hp
- Transmission: Allison 3200
- Suspension: 4x4 Double wishbone suspension
- Ground clearance: 14 inches (360 mm)
- Maximum speed: 68 miles per hour (109 km/h)

RG-33L (six wheel extended variant)
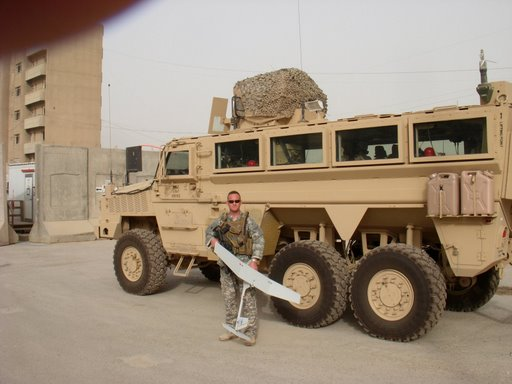
- Type: Mine-Resistant Ambush Protected Vehicle

Service history
- Used by: US Army; US Marines; Croatian Army
- Wars: Global war on terrorism

Production history
- Designer: Land Systems OMC
- Manufacturer: BAE Systems Land Systems South Africa
- Unit cost: $630,000
- Produced: October 2006 (RG-33L)
- Variants: RG-33L (6x6)

Specifications
- Length: 28 feet (8,500 mm)
- Width: 8 feet (2,400 mm)
- Height: 9.5 feet (2,900 mm)
- Crew: 2 + 12 crew
- Armor: monocoque v-hull
- Main armament: Optional armored glass turret or remote weapon station
- Engine: Cummins 400 Turbo Diesel; 400hp
- Transmission: Allison 3200
- Suspension: 6x6 Double wishbone suspension
- Ground clearance: 14 inches (360 mm)
- Fuel capacity: 80 gal
- Maximum speed: 70 miles per hour (110 km/h)

The RG-33 is a mine-resistant light armored vehicle initially designed by BAE Systems Land Systems South Africa (formerly Land Systems OMC), a South African subsidiary of BAE Systems. BAE Systems in the US extensively modified it with additional protection, new powertrain, and suspension systems. It was built in a number of locations including York, Pennsylvania. It was one of several vehicles being fielded by the US Armed Forces in Iraq under the United States MRAP program.

== Overview ==
It is based on the RG-31, which itself is based on the Mamba APC, although it is roughly twice the weight of a RG-31. There are two variants, the standard RG-33 has four wheels and weighs 22 tons while the extended RG-33L variant has six wheels, can carry twice as many people in the back, and weighs 26 to 37 tons depending on the version.

It was selected to be the sole producer of the US Army's $2.88 billion Medium Mine Protected Vehicle program. The initial contract is worth $20 million. BAE representative Doug Coffey says that live-fire testing at Aberdeen, Maryland, proved the RG-33 to be the overall most survivable MRAP vehicle.

The RG33 is manufactured in several configurations including the category I 4×4, category II 6×6, the heavy armored ground ambulance (HAGA) and the special operations command (SOCOM) vehicle.

== Design ==
It features a monocoque armoured v-hull, for maximized interior space, seats and footrests suspended from the ceiling, run-flat tires, and an optional armored glass turret (Gunner Protection Kit or GPK), for maximized visibility and protection. The monocoque hull does not extend under the engine like some other armoured vehicles. The engine compartment is a separate monocoque structure that bolts to rest of the hull. The vehicle is notable for its extensive use of TRAPP armored glass in the crew compartment. Like the Buffalo, it can be equipped with a robotic arm.

The U.S. has fielded 259 RG-33 4x4 variants in a Special Operations Command (SOCOM) configuration as shown above with remote weapon stations, two extra seats, and a rear door assist. The U.S. has also fielded 16 RG-33L 6x6 variants in a Heavy Armoured Ground Ambulance (HAGA) configuration.

The Pentagon has future plans to add the Crows II remote weapon station, Boomerang anti-sniper system, and the Frag Kit 6 anti-EFP armour.

== Production history ==
- On 26 January 2007, four (2 of each variant) RG-33s were delivered to the United States Marine Corps for testing.
- On 14 February, an order for 15 MRAP Cat 1 RG-33s and 75 MRAP Cat 2 RG-33Ls was placed under an Indefinite Delivery, Indefinite Quantity contract.
- On 28 June, BAE received a $235.8M order for 16 RG-33 Cat 1 patrol vehicles, 239 RG-33L Cat 2 vehicles, 170 RG-33 Cat 1 variants for the United States Special Operations Command, out of their total allotment of 333 vehicles, and 16 RG-33L Cat 2 Ambulance variants, which are the first vehicles in the competition specifically listed for the ambulance role. The vehicle can be mission configured for a number of roles including Infantry Carrier, Ambulance, Command and Control, Convoy Escort and Explosive Ordnance Disposal. On 18/Oct, an additional order for 600 MRAPS was received, involving 399 RGL-33L Cat 2, 112 RGL-33L Cat 2 Ambulance variants and 89 RG-33 SOCOM for 322 Million dollars. On Dec/18/07 a further order for 600 RG-33L Cat 2 was awarded to BAE Systems, for 645 Million dollars. To date, this gives a total of 1,735 RG-33 vehicles being ordered by the US Military.
- On 2 December 2012, BAE received a $37.6 million contract to convert 250 RG-33L 6×6 vehicles up to the Medium Mine Protected Vehicle status. Differences include a rear ramp for deploying unmanned ground vehicles, a new heating and air conditioning system, larger modular interior, high mobility chassis, extensive equipment options, larger bullet-resistant windows, and 360-degree situational awareness suite.

== Versions ==
- RG-33 (4×4)
- RG-33 with SPARK I/II mine roller
- RG-33L (6×6)
- RG-33L (additional armor)
- RG-33 SOCOM (equipment transporter)
- RG-33L HAGA (medevac)
- RG-33L HAGA (additional armor)
- RG-33L MRRMV (recovery vehicle)
- RG-33L with mine clearing robotic arm
- RG-33L command version

== Operators ==
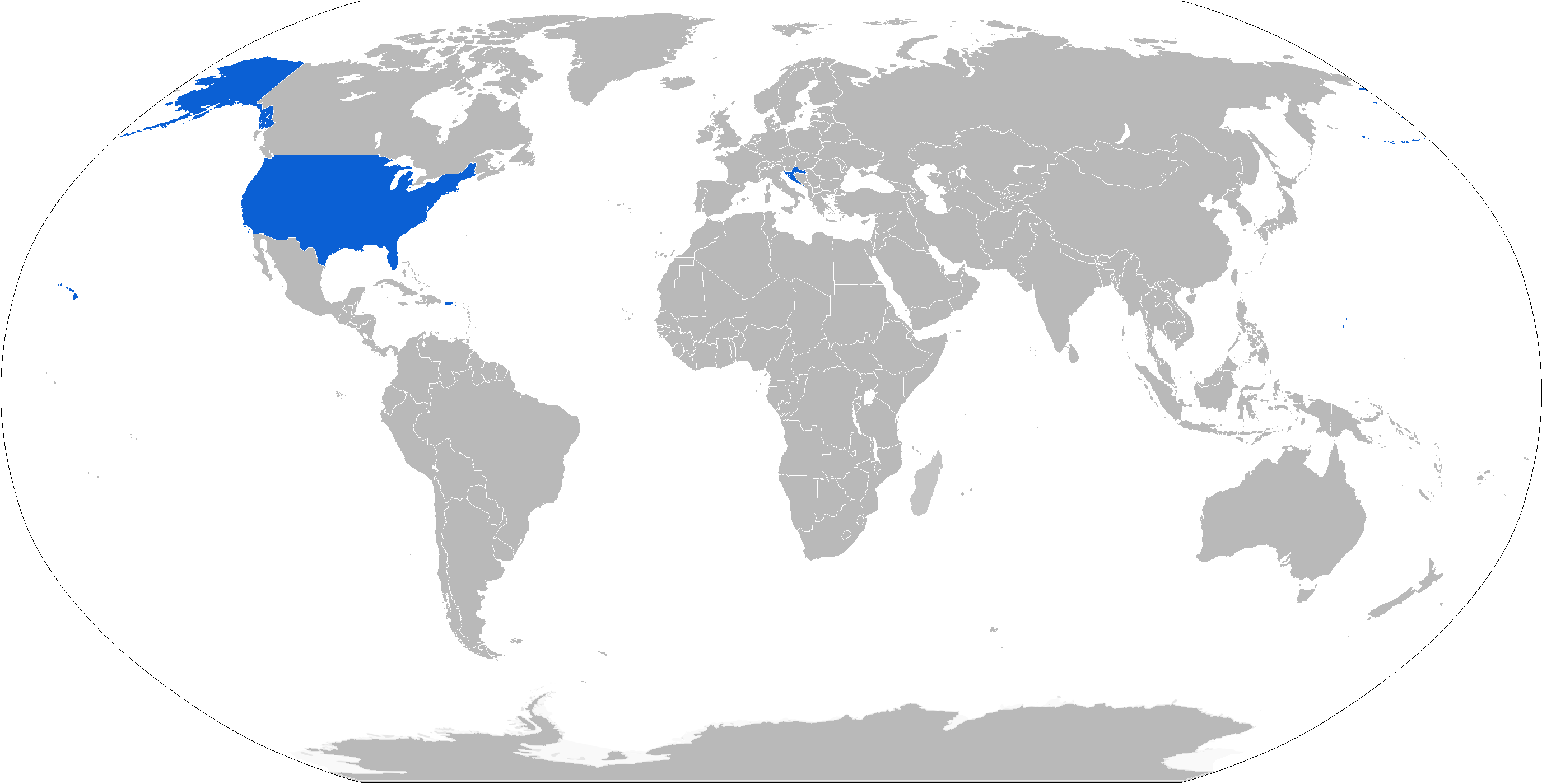
Map with RG-33 operators in blue

Burundi

- 10 RG-33L in service with the Burundi Army.

Croatia

- Croatian Army

Djibouti

- Djiboutian Army - 10 RG-33

Egypt

- Egyptian Army - 260 RG-33L + 90 RG-33L HAGA

Nigeria

- Took delivery of 24 RG-33s after being refurbished.

United States

- United States Army
- United States Marine Corps
- United States Special Operations Command

Uzbekistan

- Armed Forces of the Republic of Uzbekistan along with the border guard are known to be operators of the RG-33L

== See also ==
- Buffel
- Casspir
- List of AFVs
- Mamba APC
- Matador (mine protected vehicle)
- Medium Mine Protected Vehicle - The U.S. Army Equivalent to the MRAP Program
- MRAP - U.S. Military Mine Resistant Ambush Protected Vehicle Program
- Nexter Aravis
- RCV-9
- RG-12
- RG-19
- RG-31
- RG-32
- RG-34
- RG-35
