= RG-35 =

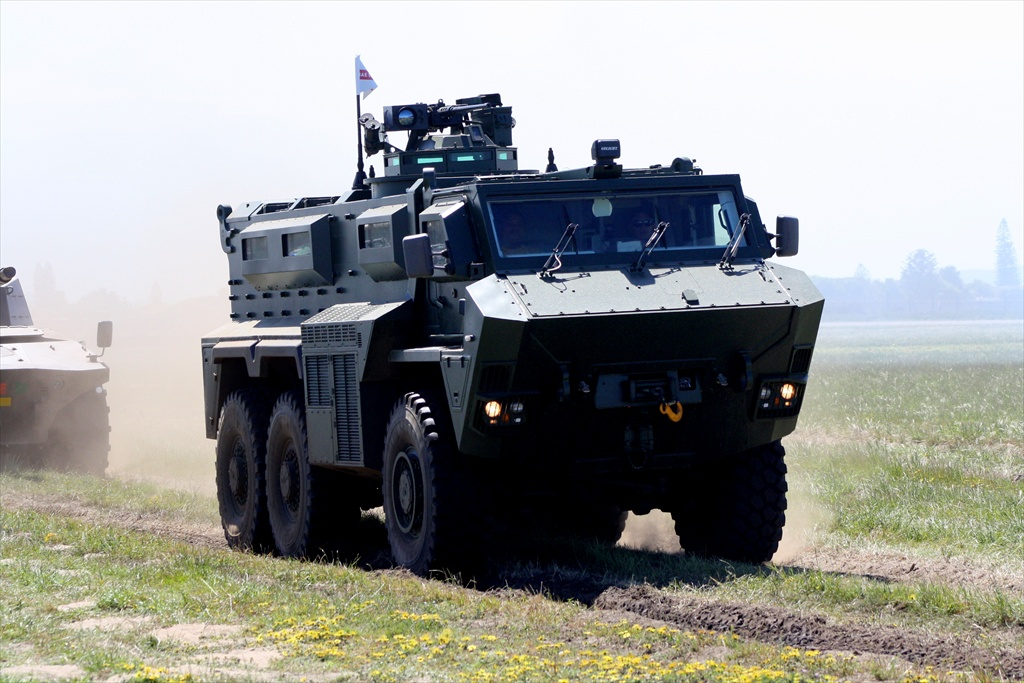
- Type: MRAP (armored vehicle)
- Place of origin: South Africa

Production history
- Designer: Land Systems OMC
- Designed: 2008
- Manufacturer: BAE Systems Land Systems South Africa
- Produced: 2009
- Variants: RG-35 6x6 and 4x4 (Specifications below pertain to the 6x6 variant)

Specifications
- Mass: 18.13 tonnes
- Length: 7.4 metres (24 ft)
- Width: 2.5 metres (8 ft 2 in)
- Height: 2.7 metres (8 ft 10 in)
- Crew: 1+15
- Main armament: light/ medium gun turret
- Engine: Cummins diesel 410 kilowatts (550 hp)
- Payload capacity: 15,000 kilograms (33,000 lb)
- Transmission: ZF 6HP
- Ground clearance: 458 millimetres (18.0 in)
- Operational range: 1,000 kilometres (620 mi)
- Maximum speed: 115 kilometres per hour (71 mph)

RG-35, is a South African mine resistant ambush protected vehicle developed by Land Systems OMC, a subsidiary of BAE Systems. The RG-35 was introduced in 2009 as a 6x6 vehicle, and a 4x4 version is also under development with the designers intending to make it a new family of vehicles. Described by BAE Systems as a "new class of vehicle" combining the capabilities of a 4x4 mine protected vehicle and a 8x8 combat vehicle, the RG-35 can be utilized in a variety of roles, including command, ambulance or recovery vehicle.

Its large payload capability allows additional armour to be added to the RG-35, which can offer protection of up to STANAG 4569 level 4. It is powered by a Cummins diesel engine, although it can also accommodate hybrid electric drive. The vehicle can be fitted with light or medium gun turrets, allowing it to be equipped with a wide range of weapons.

== History ==
Land Systems OMC, a subdivision of BAE Systems in South Africa, began development of the RG-35 in early 2008 as a private venture. Based on BAE Systems' existing RG range including the RG-31 Nyala, RG-32 Scout and the RG-33, it was intended to be a Mine Resistant Ambush Protected vehicle (MRAP) that could offer a high level of protection, high payload capability as well as a high level of cross-country mobility. Development of the vehicle was completed in a year, and it was unveiled to the public in September 2009 at the Defence Systems and Equipment International (DSEi) exhibition in London. BAE systems described it as a combination of a 4x4 mine protected vehicle and a 8x8 combat vehicle, calling it a groundbreaking new class of vehicle. The RG-35 displayed at the DSEi was the standard 6x6 version. However, BAE Systems are also developing a 4x4 version, intending to make the RG-35 into a new family of vehicles. The 4x4 version is expected to become operational by late 2010. The company has expressed confidence in obtaining orders for the RG-35, and it has been speculated that it may be submitted to the British Army's Light Protected Patrol Vehicle project as well as for the South African Army's Project Sepula, which seeks to replace their Casspir and Mamba Armoured Personnel Carriers.

== Features ==
The 6x6 version of the vehicle can accommodate 16 personnel, including the driver. It has a length of 7.4 metres (24 ft), a width of 2.5 metres (8 ft 2 in) and a height of 2.7 metres (8 ft 10 in), with a ground clearance of 458 millimetres (18.0 in). The gross vehicle mass of the RG-35 is 33,000 kilograms (73,000 lb). The vehicle has a range of 1,000 kilometres (620 mi) and a top speed of 115 kilometres per hour (71 mph), powered by a 410 kilowatts (550 hp) Cummins diesel engine coupled to a ZF 6HP automatic transmission. This power pack is mounted on the side of the vehicle rather than the traditional front or rear mounting. It can be replaced in 30 minutes, and this positioning of the power pack allows more internal space as well. All main systems of the vehicle are armour protected, and it also contains a dual air-conditioning system. It can be configured for use in a variety of combat roles such as a command post vehicle, an engineering vehicle, a mortar vehicle, an anti-aircraft vehicle, a recovery vehicle or even an ambulance. The RG-35 is also designed to easily accommodate hybrid electric drive.

The RG-35 can be equipped with light or medium gun turrets as well as indirect fire weapons. This allows a wide range of weapons to be used, including 12.7 mm machine guns and up to 20 mm calibre weapons. The RG-35 can offer STANAG 4569 level 4 protection due to its V-shaped hull and 15 cubic metres (530 cu ft) of under-armour, and is equipped with armoured glass windows that can provide all-round situational awareness to the personnel inside. Its payload capability is 15,000 kilograms (33,000 lb), which also allows extra armour to be added without reducing performance. Additional 120 millimetres (4.7 in) thick armour can be added to the V-hull, while 50 millimetres (2.0 in) thick additional armour can be added to the sides. The RG-35 can be transported in an Airbus A400M or larger aircraft.
