= RG-34 =

Light tactical military vehicle

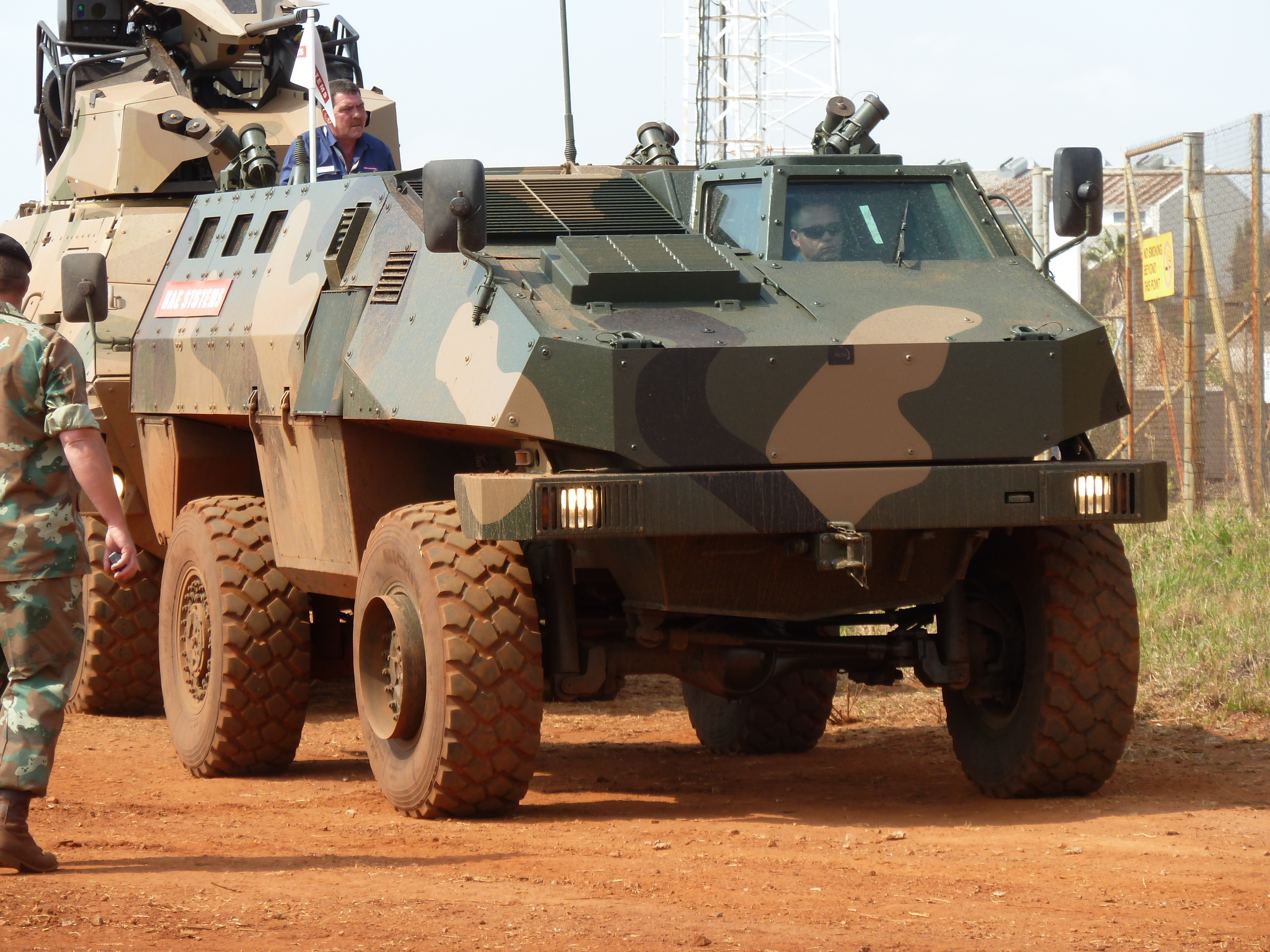
- Type: MRAP
- Place of origin: South Africa

Production history
- Designer: IADSA
- Manufacturer: BAE Systems South Africa
- Produced: 2009

Specifications
- Mass: 9,500 kg
- Length: 5,050 mm
- Width: 2350 mm
- Height: 2150 mm
- Crew: 8
- Armor: Welded steel
- Main armament: various
- Engine: Fuel diesel 160 kW (215 hp)
- Power/weight: 25.1 hp/tonne
- Transmission: 5-speed automatic
- Fuel capacity: 156 litres
- Operational range: 1000 km
- Maximum speed: 105 km/h

The RG-34 (formerly denoted as Iguana FV4) is a South African Mine-Resistant Ambush Protected vehicle (MRAP). Specially designed to be mine-resistant, it has been produced in multiple variants, equipped for troop or cargo transport, command, and fire support. Originally showcased with a wide turret ring and a 90mm rifled cannon, the RG-34 was one of the first MRAPs configured to carry a large gun system.

== Development ==
Development of the Iguana was initiated under contract by Industrial & Automotive South Africa (IADSA) for a Belgian firm, Sabiex; the first prototype being completed in early 2002. By June 2009, BAE Land Systems had obtained necessary rights to develop and manufacture the vehicle. The RG-34 was initially displayed with a potent weapons system for an MRAP, in the form of an overlarge turret fitted with a 90mm (3.5 in.) gun. This has since been replaced by a more ergonomic tactical remote turret (TRT) boasting a 25mm M242 autocannon and a co-axial 7.62mm machine gun.

=== Design ===
RG-34's cross-country performance is attributed to its unique suspension, a multi-link hydro-pneumatic structure mounted on a very rigid chassis. This affords optimal performance on road surfaces, a superior turning radius, and clearance over rugged terrain. When deployed in the reconnaissance role long-range fuel tanks give the vehicle an extended operating range of 1,000 kilometres.

The hull of the RG-34 is of welded steel construction. Despite the weight restrictions imposed on wheeled platforms, all-around armour protection is reasonable against 7.62mm AP rounds at 30 metres, air burst fragments, and anti-tank mines.

== Variants ==
- TRT-25mm Model - Current production model armed with a dual feed M242 Bushmaster autocannon and a 7.62mm machine gun mounted to the right of the main armament. The turret is provided with an advanced laser fire-control system, a colour CCD camera, as well as a thermal night camera for identifying targets at up to 7,600 metres. Total ammunition capacity is 260 rounds of 25mm and 1,000 rounds of machine gun ammunition.
- 90mm Gun Model - Fire-support and anti-tank variant. The 90mm gun is adapted from the Eland Mk7 and can fire a HEAT charge with a muzzle velocity of 760 m/s, the complete round weighing 7 kg, with an effective range of 1,500 metres. In addition, an HE shell is available, which weighs 8.66 kg complete, has a muzzle velocity of 650 m/s and a maximum range of 1,500 metres. The turret has two circular hatches which open to the rear, eight periscopes, and a prominent commander's cupola.

== Operators ==
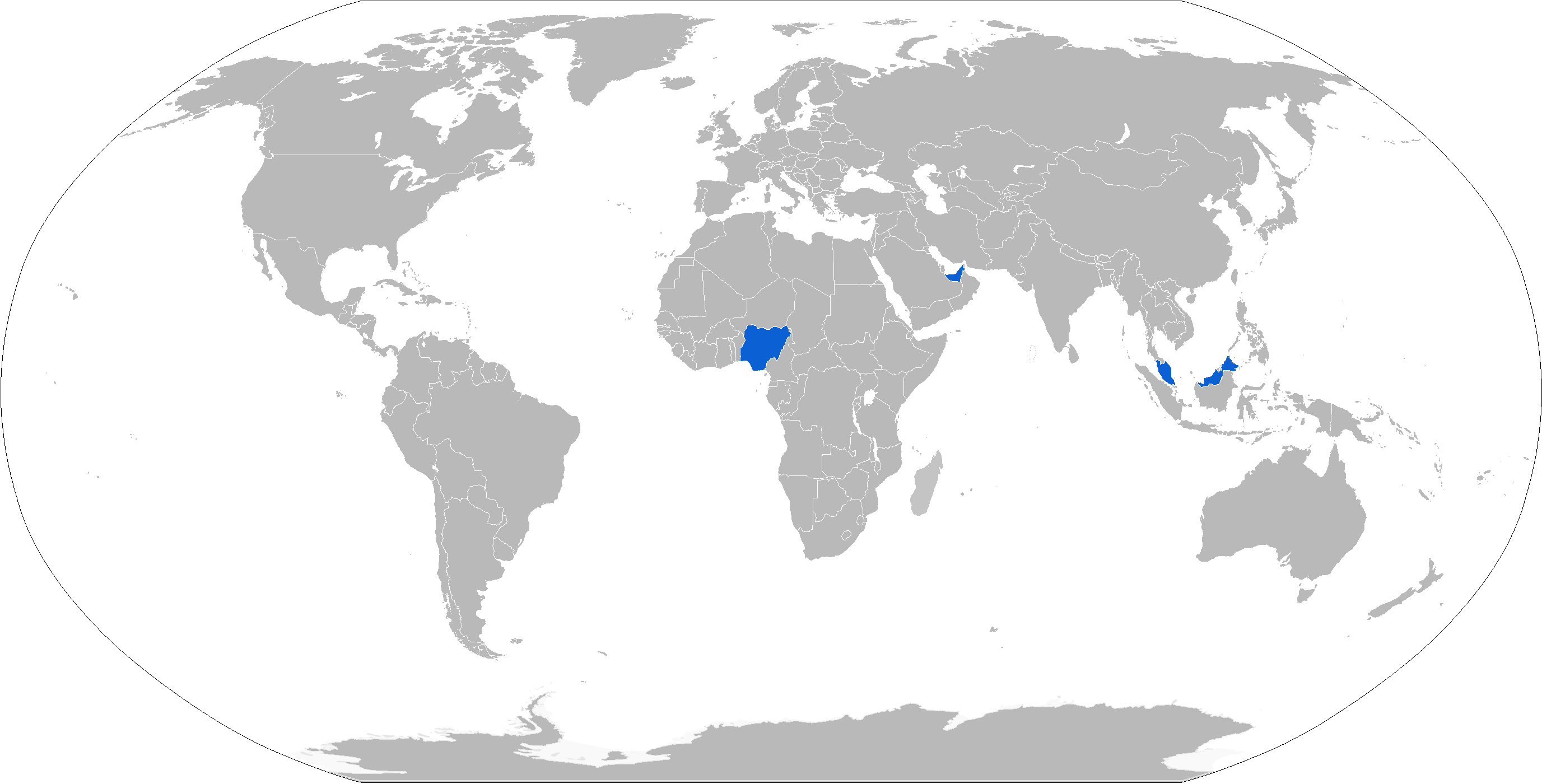
Map with RG-34 operators in blue

=== Current operators ===
- Nigeria: Manufactured for the Nigerian Armed Forces as the Proforce Pf1. Possibly shelved in favour of the Igirigi.
- United Arab Emirates: Production rights granted.
- Malaysia: Produced under license as the Deftech AV4. Two were ordered by the Royal Malaysian Police. Up to 200 were scheduled to be produced under license, although it remains unclear whether this was successful.

== See also ==
- RG-12
- RG-31
- RG-32
- RG-33
- RG-35
