= BAE Systems Land Systems South Africa =

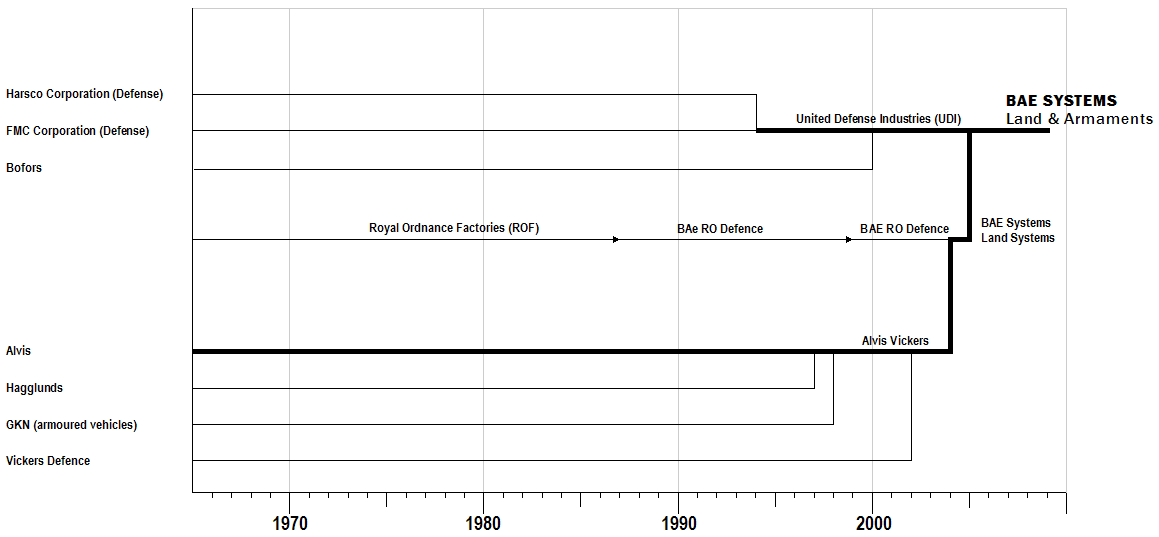
Evolution of the land systems division of BAE Systems, from the 1970s to the formation of Land & Armaments.

BAE Systems Land Systems South Africa (LSSA) was a South African defence company that operated as a subsidiary of BAE Systems Land Systems. On 28 April 2015, BAE Systems announced the sale of its 75% stake in the company to the state-owned defence group Denel. Denel acquired the stake for R641 million in cash, with the total acquisition costing R855 million after it also purchased the remaining 25% from the company's Black Economic Empowerment (BEE) partner, DGD Technologies. Following the acquisition, LSSA was rebranded as Denel Vehicle Systems (DVS).

== History ==
=== Origins and Sanctions Era (1977–1994) ===
The company's origins trace back to the establishment of the Olifant Manufacturing Company (OMC) in 1978. Its creation was a direct response to the mandatory arms embargo imposed against South Africa by United Nations Security Council Resolution 418 in 1977. The embargo compelled the domestic defence industry to become self-sufficient, leading to the establishment of OMC to produce the Olifant tank for the South African Army.

OMC was soon acquired by Reunert and became a division known as Reumech OMC. This period marked the company's most prolific phase of vehicle development, driven by the operational demands of the South African Border War. The South African Defence Force's initial lack of suitable equipment for the conflict in Angola created an urgent need for advanced and capable armoured vehicles.

=== Post-Apartheid Acquisitions (1999–2004) ===
After South Africa's 1994 democratic elections and its readmittance to the international community, the company attracted foreign interest. In September 1999, Reunert sold its mechanical defence division to the British engineering company Vickers for between R84 million and R116 million, and the company was renamed Vickers OMC.

On 30 September 2002, the British military-industrial firm Alvis plc acquired Vickers' defence interests and purchased a 75% stake in the South African branch, renaming it Alvis OMC. In 2004, BAE Systems purchased the military vehicle division of Alvis, and OMC became part of BAE Systems' Land Systems division, undergoing its final name change to Land Systems OMC.

=== Black Economic Empowerment (BEE) Partnership ===
Under BAE Systems' ownership, LSSA was 75% owned by BAE, with the remaining 25% held by a Black Economic Empowerment partner, DGD Technologies 2001 (Pty) Ltd. Notable shareholders in DGD Technologies included Moeletsi Mbeki, brother of former South African president Thabo Mbeki, and Diliza Mji.

== Corporate Divisions (at time of sale) ==
At the time of its acquisition by Denel, LSSA was organised into three primary divisions.

=== Land Systems OMC ===
This division was the core of the company and South Africa's primary military vehicle manufacturer, responsible for iconic vehicles like the Olifant tank, Rooikat, and G6.

=== Land Systems Gear Ratio ===
This division manufactured specialised geartrain products for military vehicles, as well as for mining equipment, industrial machinery, and traction locomotives.

=== Land Systems Dynamics ===
On 16 April 2008, BAE Systems acquired IST Dynamics, a privately held company owned by the Ethos Group, which became Land Systems Dynamics. Based in Pretoria, the division specialised in developing fire directing systems, remotely controlled turrets, weapon stations, and related fire control subsystems.

== Acquisition by Denel (2015) ==
The 2015 sale to Denel marked a significant consolidation in the South African defence industry. Riaz Saloojee, then the chief executive officer of Denel, stated, "This proposed acquisition is in line with our company's strategy to broaden our leading land system solutions." The acquisition was finalised in April 2015, transferring ownership of LSSA to the state-owned entity.
