= Foreign trade of South Africa =

Exports of South Africa by product category (2019) Chemical products Transportation Machines Mineral products Plastics and rubbers Metals Foodstuffs Precious metals Textiles Instruments Animal products Vegetable products Paper goods Footwear and headwear Miscellaneous Stone and glass Wood products Animal and vegetable bi-products Animal hides Arts and antiques Weapons

Since the end of apartheid, foreign trade in South Africa has increased, following the lifting of several sanctions and boycotts which were imposed as a means of ending apartheid.

South Africa is the second largest producer of gold in Africa and is the world's largest producer of chrome, manganese, platinum, vanadium, and vermiculite, the second largest producer of ilmenite, palladium, rutile, and zirconium. It is also the world's third largest coal exporter. Although, mining only accounts for 3% of the GDP, down from around 14% in the 1980s. South Africa also has a large agricultural sector and is a net exporter of farming products.

Principal international trading partners of South Africa—besides other African countries—include Germany, the United States, China, Japan, the United Kingdom, and Spain. Chief exports include corn, diamonds, fruits, gold, metals and minerals, sugar, coal, and wool. Machinery and transportation equipment make up more than one-third of the value of the country's imports. Other imports include chemicals, and manufactured goods.

== History ==
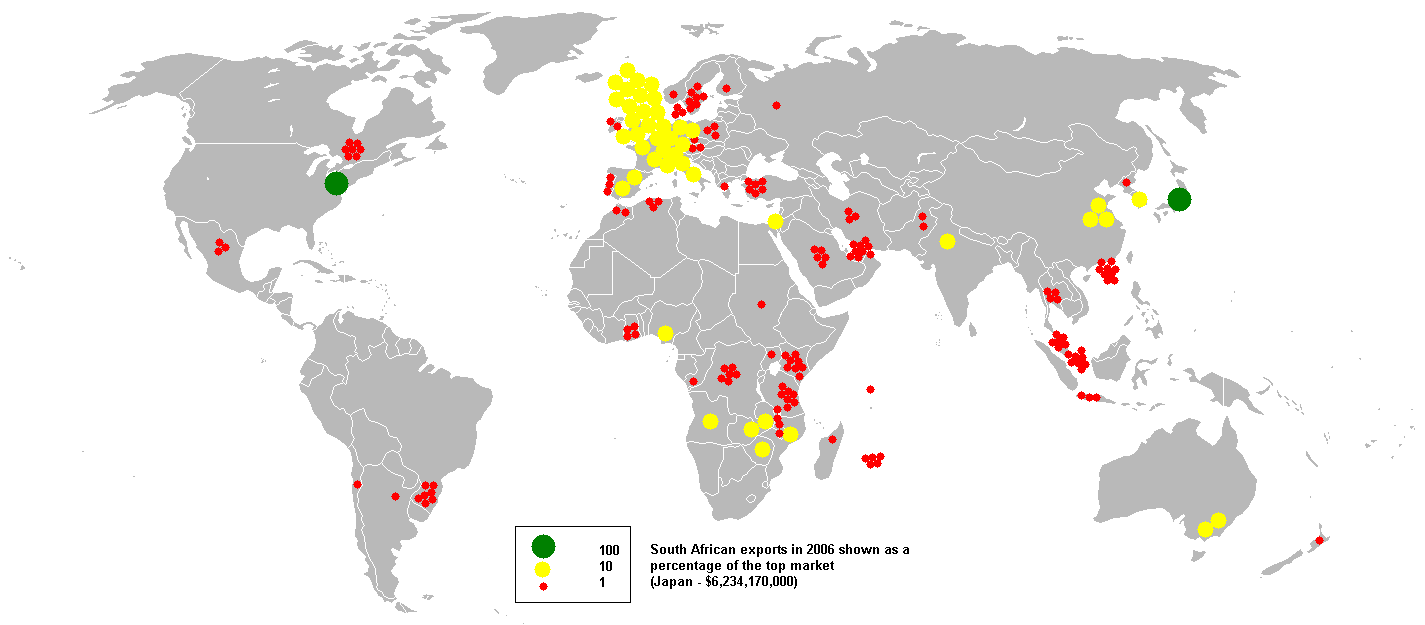
This bubble map shows the global distribution of South African exports in 2006 as a percentage of the top market (Japan - $6,234,170,000).

During apartheid, South Africa's foreign trade and investment were affected by sanctions and boycotts by other countries ideologically opposed to apartheid. In 1970, the United Nations Security Council, adopted resolution 282 imposing a voluntary arms embargo upon South Africa, which was extended by subsequent resolutions 418 and 591, declaring the embargo mandatory. In 1978, South Africa was prohibited loans from the Export-Import Bank of the United States which was later followed by a prohibition on IMF loans in 1983. An oil embargo was imposed by OPEC in 1983 which was strengthened by Iran in 1979.

== Imports and exports ==
Value of South Africa's balance of trade

South Africa's main export trading partners are the European Union, the United States, Japan. China's share in exports is increasing, and has risen from 1.7% in 1994 to nearly 11% in 2007.

Top ten export markets in 2021
Country	Value (billion of Rands)	Value in US$ (billion of Dollars)	Percentage of total exports
China	R 199.97	$ 13.31	11.79%
United States	R 193.00	$ 12.87	11.37%
Germany	R 155.05	$ 10.34	9.14%
Japan	R 121.45	$ 8.09	7.16%
United Kingdom	R 120.85	$ 8.06	7.12%
Botswana	R 64.47	$ 4.29	3.8%
Mozambique	R 63.92	$ 4.26	3.77%
India	R 61.38	$ 4.09	3.62%
Netherlands	R 61.31	$ 4.09	3.61%
Belgium	R 52.31	$ 3.49	3.08%

Top ten import source countries in 2021The percentages below are incorrect (same as above!)
Country	Value (billions of Rands)	Value in US$ (billions of Dollars)	Percentage of total imports
China	R 283.97	$ 18.93	11.79%
Germany	R 111.46	$ 7.43	11.37%
United States	R 96.86	$ 6.46	9.14%
India	R 78.92	$ 5.26	7.16%
Saudi Arabia	R 60.61	$ 4.04	7.12%
Thailand	R 43.92	$ 2.93	3.8%
Japan	R 38.44	$ 2.56	3.77%
Italy	R 38.08	$ 2.54	3.62%
Nigeria	R 33.09	$ 2.21	3.61%
France	R 29.03	$ 1.93	3.08%

== African trade ==
Almost 90% of South Africa's exports to the rest of Africa go to the SADC economies. In 2018, South Africa exported and imported goods to and from the rest of Africa to the value of US$25 billion and US$11.5 billion, respectively. Intra-Africa exports account for 26% of South Africa's total exports and imports for 12% of total imports for 2018. South African exports to the rest of Africa are predominantly of value-added goods. In terms of South Africa's total trade (exports + imports) with the rest of the continent; Namibia (13%), Botswana (12%), Nigeria (12%), and Mozambique (12%) are South Africa's main African trading partners.

== Trade agreements ==
The following includes a list of existing trade agreements signed by South Africa:

Regional agreements

- European Union: Trade Agreement between the European Union (EU) and South Africa
- EFTA:Trade Agreement between Southern African Customs Union (SACU) and European Free Trade Association (EFTA) states
- SADC: The Southern African Development Community (SADC) Trade Agreement
- Southern African Customs Union
- AU: African Continental Free Trade Area
- Mercosur: within the Common Market of the South (MERCOSUR) and the Southern African Customs Union (SACU)
- Generalized System of Preferences Russia, Belarus and Kazakhstan

Multilateral agreements

- WTO: The Generalized System of Preferences

Bilateral agreements

- Malawi: Agreement between the Governments of the Republic of South Africa and the Republic of Malawi
- Norway: Generalized System of Preferences Norway
- Turkey: Generalized System of Preferences Turkey
- United Kingdom: through the SACU and Mozambique-UK Economic Partnership Agreement (SACUM-UK EPA)
- United States: The African Growth and Opportunity Act (AGOA)
- United States: US-Southern African Customs Union Free Trade Agreement: (US-SAUC; incl. South Africa, Botswana, Lesotho, Eswatini, and Namibia; on hold since 2006 due to US demands on intellectual property rights, government procurement rights and investment)
- Zimbabwe: Trade Agreement between Zimbabwe and South Africa

== See also ==
- Economy of South Africa
- Economy of the Western Cape
