= United Nations Security Council Resolution 919 =

UN Security Council Resolution 919
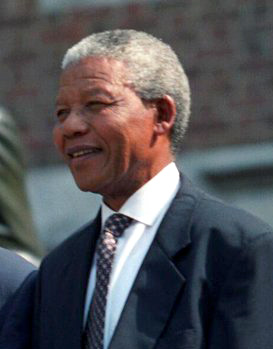
- South African President Nelson Mandela
- Date: 25 May 1994
- Meeting no.: 3,379
- Code: S/RES/919 (Document)
- Subject: South Africa
- Voting summary: 15 voted for; None voted against; None abstained
- Result: Adopted

Security Council composition
- Permanent members: China; France; Russia; United Kingdom; United States
- Non-permanent members: Argentina; Brazil; Czech Republic; Djibouti; New Zealand; Nigeria; Oman; Pakistan; Rwanda; Spain

United Nations Security Council resolution 919, adopted unanimously on 25 May 1994, after recalling all resolutions on South Africa, in particular resolutions 282 (1970), 418 (1977), 421 (1977), 558 (1984) and 591 (1986), the Council welcomed the recent general elections and new government and decided, under Chapter VII of the United Nations Charter, to terminate the arms embargo and all other restrictions against South Africa.

Measures imposed in other resolutions would also be ended. The Committee of the Security Council established in Resolution 421 was also dissolved.

Thabo Mbeki, Deputy President of South Africa, welcomed the lifting of restrictions, stating that they were "acceptance by the world body that we (South Africa) have become a democratic country".

== See also ==
- Academic boycott of South Africa
- Disinvestment from South Africa
- Foreign relations of apartheid South Africa
- List of United Nations Security Council Resolutions 901 to 1000 (1994–1995)
- Negotiations to end apartheid in South Africa
- Apartheid
- Sporting boycott of South Africa
