= Ratel IFV =

Ratel
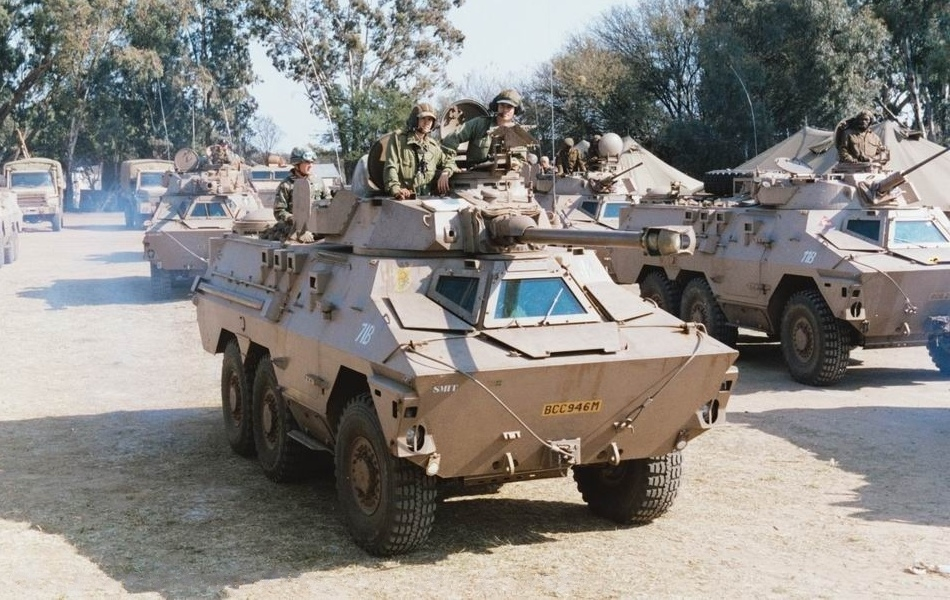
- Ratel-90 Mk III of the South African Army
- Type: Infantry fighting vehicle
- Place of origin: South Africa

Service history
- In service: 1976-present
- Used by: See Operators
- Wars: South African Border War; Western Sahara War; Operation Boleas; African Union Mission to Somalia; Boko Haram insurgency Central African Republic Civil War (2012–2014); Libyan Civil War (2014–present); Yemeni Civil War (2015–present)

Production history
- Designer: Springfield Büssing
- Designed: March 1972
- Manufacturer: Sandock Austral; Reumech OMC
- Produced: 1976 – 1987
- No. built: 1,381
- Variants: See Variants

Specifications
- Mass: 18.5 tonnes (20.4 short tons; 18.2 long tons) (Ratel-20/Ratel-60); 19 tonnes (21 short tons; 19 long tons) (Ratel-90)
- Length: 7.21 m (23 ft 8 in) (hull)
- Width: 2.5 m (8 ft 2 in)
- Height: 2.39 m (7 ft 10 in) (Ratel-20); 3.11 m (10 ft 2 in) (Ratel-60); 2.91 m (9 ft 7 in) (Ratel-90)
- Crew: 3 (commander, gunner, driver) + maximum 9 passengers
- Main armament: See Variants
- Secondary armament: 7.62 mm Browning M1919 coaxial machine gun 7.62 mm Browning M1919 machine gun on rear ring mount 7.62 mm Browning M1919 machine gun on turret roof (Ratel-60/90); 3,600—6,000 stowed rounds of 7.62 mm ammunition
- Engine: Büssing D 3256 BTXF six-cylinder turbocharged diesel 205 kW (275 hp) at 2,200 rpm
- Power/weight: 11.36 kW/t (0.00691 hp/lb)
- Ground clearance: 0.34 m (1 ft 1 in)
- Fuel capacity: 530 L (140 US gal)
- Operational range: 1,000 km (620 mi)
- Maximum speed: 105 km/h (65 mph)

The Ratel is a South African infantry fighting vehicle. It was the first wheeled infantry fighting vehicle to enter service worldwide and was built on a modified MAN truck chassis. The Ratel was designed in response to a South African Army specification for a light armoured vehicle suited to the demands of rapid offensives, providing maximum firepower and strategic mobility to mechanised infantry units intended to operate across the vast distances of Southern Africa. Primarily envisaged in SADF doctrine as a vehicle that could deliver mechanised infantry and supporting fire to tanks in conventional warfare, it was also anticipated that the Ratel could form the centrepiece for semi-independent battlegroups where logistics or politics precluded the use of tanks. The Ratel was a simple, economical design which helped reduce the significant logistical commitment necessary to keep heavier combat vehicles operational in undeveloped regions. It was generally regarded as an influential concept which incorporated a number of novel features, such as a mine-protected hull and a 20 mm autocannon fitted with what was then a unique twin-linked ammunition feed, allowing turret gunners to rapidly swap between ammunition types during combat.

The first Ratel prototype appeared in March 1972, and serial production commenced in 1976. Rights to the original prototype were also sold to Belgium, which produced an amphibious derivative known as the SIBMAS. The Ratel was produced in three distinct marks between 1976 and 1987, when production ceased. All three marks were modified for a number of diverse battlefield roles. Specialised variants of the Ratel carried mortars, anti-tank guided missiles, or a turret-mounted 90 mm rifled gun.

== Development history ==
During the 1950s, the South African Defence Force (SADF) had been primarily organised to operate alongside the British Armed Forces in the event of a military crisis affecting the British Empire's African or Middle Eastern dependencies. This reflected South Africa's longstanding defence ties to the United Kingdom and the other member states in the Commonwealth of Nations. As a result of its strategic priorities, the SADF adopted equipment which was either British in origin or otherwise compatible with Commonwealth doctrine. South African infantry units were equipped primarily with Alvis Saracen armoured personnel carriers. This reflected traditional British infantry doctrine, which placed a disproportionate emphasis on dismounted infantry; the role of armoured vehicles like the Saracen was to function as general transporters conveying infantrymen to a battlefield. Afterwards, the infantry was expected to disembark and fight on foot rather than remaining mounted.

The deterioration of relations between South Africa and the United Kingdom in the wake of the Sharpeville Massacre marked a shift in the SADF's doctrine and strategic priorities. The SADF became more focused on the threat of domestic insurgency or limited bush conflicts rather than a major conventional war overseas. Additionally, the British government's refusal to supply the SADF with new armoured vehicles forced it to turn to alternative suppliers, namely France and West Germany. Both nations cooperated closely with South African firms like Sandock-Austral to set up the country's first armoured vehicle factory at Boksburg. West Germany was especially instrumental in the transfer of defence technology; in exchange it received a higher import quota for its automotive products to South Africa. One result was that German companies came to dominate several sectors of the South African civilian and military vehicle market, including achieving a virtual monopoly on the sale of trucks to the SADF. Much of this business was conducted through local subsidiaries such as Springfield-Büssing SA, an East Rand company which was the franchise holder for all Büssing products in South Africa. Springfield-Büssing assembled its vehicles with locally manufactured bodies and engine and chassis components imported from its German parent firm.

In 1968, the SADF began formulating a new mobile warfare doctrine which centered around the independent deployment of mechanised infantry to defend the vast borders of South West Africa (Namibia), which were deemed vulnerable to the threat of insurgency and external infiltration. Mechanised infantry mounted in their own infantry fighting vehicles (IFVs) could arrive sooner at contact points, with greater firepower to engage and destroy the enemy where contact was made, as well as greater protection and convenience for troops. During wargaming exercises designed to simulate a foreign invasion of South West Africa, the SADF found none of its preexisting armoured vehicles suitable to fill this role, so development of a new dedicated IFV was undertaken. Any South African IFV had to be a simple, economical design which helped ease the significant logistical commitment to maintain armoured vehicles in border regions otherwise lacking in advanced support or transport infrastructure. Excessive track wear inflicted by the abrasive, sandy terrain of the South West African border prompted South African officials to specify a wheeled vehicle. Wheeled IFVs were also favoured because they possessed a much greater operating range than tracked vehicles, and did not require the use of transporters on South West Africa's limited road and rail network. This marked a significant departure from Soviet and Western IFV doctrine, which had rejected wheeled IFVs for their inferior cross-country capability and weight-carrying capacity, as well as the vulnerable nature of their tyres to small arms fire and artillery fragments. However, improvements in power train, suspension, and run-flat tyre technology during the late 1960s helped make the concept of wheeled IFVs more viable. The SADF initially had no other requirements other than a chassis and hull combination capable of supporting a two-man turret.

Springfield-Büssing proposed a six-wheeled IFV built on a modified MAN truck chassis; the first prototype appeared as the Springfield-Büssing Buffel in March 1972. After the SADF had evaluated and rejected a number of other designs, including the Thyssen Henschel UR-416, Berliet VXB-170, Panhard M3, and the EE-11 Urutu, the Springfield-Büssing prototype was accepted for service as the Ratel. Production was undertaken by Sandock-Austral, which produced the vehicle hulls at its shipyard in Durban before having them transported by rail to its Boksburg facility for integration with the chassis and drive train. Each Ratel was powered by a Büssing D 3256 six-cylinder diesel engine fitted in a compartment at the left rear of its hull with access panels in the roof for ease of maintenance; it could be changed by two technicians with a crane in thirty minutes. It was armed with a 20 mm autocannon, which was standard armament for most Western IFVs at the time and suitable for engaging low-flying aircraft, light armour, and dismounted personnel. The SADF had selected the Hispano-Suiza HS.820 for the Ratel's primary armament due to its prior success during trials with Eland armoured cars; however, at the time of production this was superseded by a variant of the Modèle F2 produced under licence as the Denel GI-2.

The Ratel was first tested in combat during Operation Reindeer, a major South African raid on People's Liberation Army of Namibia (PLAN) insurgents based out of neighbouring Angola. For the purposes of Operation Reindeer, the SADF experimented with an integrated combat team consisting of mechanised infantry mounted in the new Ratels, backed by attached Eland armoured cars. This caused a number of delays and complications, since the four-wheeled Elands lacked sufficient mobility to keep pace with the Ratels and had to be frequently towed out of thick sand or mud. Operation Reindeer was also complicated by the fact that the Elands utilised petrol engines, which necessitated a separate logistics tail from that of the diesel-powered Ratels.

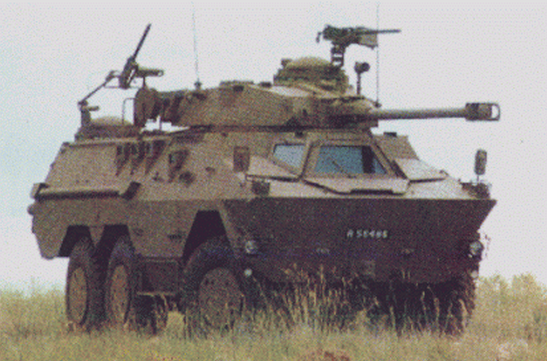
Ratel Mk II, identifiable by its exposed headlamps and the armoured cover plates over its wheel hubs.

Although PLAN possessed little conventional warfare capabilities, it was frequently backed by its allies in the Cuban and Angolan armed forces, which were skilled at constructing well-fortified defensive positions and had access to heavy armour. The addition of attached Eland squadrons to mechanised infantry units was considered necessary because they carried 60 mm breech-loading mortars or large 90 mm guns, which were more useful than the Ratel's 20 mm autocannon for engaging fixed fortifications, dug-in troops, and enemy armour as needed. However, the Eland's shortcomings in terms of mobility and logistics prompted the SADF to replace it with new variants of the Ratel carrying the same armament. The Ratel-90 fire support vehicle utilised an Eland turret with a 90 mm rifled cannon firing conventional high explosive and high explosive anti-tank shells, while the Ratel-60 mortar carrier was fitted with an Eland turret mounting a 60 mm mortar. A third variant, the Ratel Command, was introduced shortly thereafter and functioned as a mobile command post. The Ratel Command was fitted with additional radio equipment, a public address system, and map tables; it carried a 12.7 mm machine gun as its main armament. The Ratel-81 was a turretless variant with an 81 mm mortar installed in the passenger compartment. The Ratel ZT3 was the final variant to be produced and was armed with a bank of ZT3 Ingwe anti-tank guided missiles.

In 1979, Sandock-Austral introduced the Ratel Mk II, which included a number of functional modifications designed to optimise the vehicle for southern African conditions and improve mechanical reliability. In 1985, the Ratel Mk II was superseded by the Ratel Mk III, which incorporated a new cooling system and an automatic cocking mechanism for the 20 mm autocannon. Production ceased in 1987, at which point 1,381 Ratels had been manufactured.

== Service history ==
At the time of the Ratel's introduction, South African military officials were attempting to bring combined arms integration to the lowest tactical level, using brigade or even battalion-sized units as the standard all-arms unit rather than divisions. In these theoretical combat battle groups, armoured squadrons and mechanised infantry, transported in Ratels, would be integrated at the company level, giving them sufficient flexibility to operate in concert. The SADF's first integrated battle group was Combat Group Juliet, which was envisaged as a conventional strike unit to be activated for raids on guerrilla sanctuaries and infiltration routes along the borders of South West Africa and neighbouring Angola. Combat Group Juliet consisted of two companies of mechanised infantry and a squadron of Eland armoured cars. Later combat groups replaced the Eland squadron with Ratel-90s, which essentially functioned in the same role.

Ratels formed the mainstay of the SADF's ad hoc battle groups for most of the South African Border War. As the Ratel and most of the SADF's other combat vehicles were lightly armoured, South African mechanised doctrine came to revolve around such tactics as rapid movement, striking from the flank, and confusing the enemy with continuous manoeuvring. In this regard the SADF differed greatly from Western IFV doctrine–which confined the IFV's role to assisting the forward momentum of tanks–as well as Soviet IFV doctrine, which dictated that IFVs must occupy and hold terrain as needed. Although capable of operating independently, Ratel-based battle groups were not expected to occupy and hold static positions; their primary task was to outmanoeuvre an enemy unit before destroying it with a concentrated fire and movement tactic known as a firebelt action. This doctrine was suited for the wide, densely wooded expanses of southern Angola which enabled the South African forces to carry out evasive manoeuvres and strike quickly from unexpected directions without being prematurely detected. Manoeuvre-oriented warfare depended on the Ratel's speed and mobility, which were used to maximum effect to compensate for its relatively light armour.

A notable feature of the South African Border War was a cyclical pattern of increasing cross-border infiltration and raids by PLAN guerrillas, primarily from Angola, during the annual rainy season. The SADF's Ratels and other wheeled combat vehicles were hampered by thick mud, and the increased foliage cover provided PLAN with concealment from patrols. The rainy season in South West Africa and southern Angola lasted from February to April. At the end of April or early May, when the heaviest rains ceased, South African mechanised battle groups launched retaliatory raids to capture or kill the insurgents in their external sanctuaries. While carrying out an attack, Ratels interspersed into arrowhead-shaped formations, with a platoon of Ratel-20s and a troop of Ratel-90s on each flank, the command Ratels located in the centre, and the remaining Ratels following in reserve. If the mechanised battle group was integrated with tanks—as during Operation Hooper and Operation Packer—the tanks spearheaded the formation to engage hostile armour, while the Ratel-20s and Ratel-90s followed closely on the flanks to suppress any accompanying infantry. Ratel-81s, if present, occupied a place in the centre of the formation, directly behind the command Ratels.

One of the primary threats to the Ratels were hidden bunkers and the maze of trench complexes constructed around PLAN and Angolan military camps. It was not uncommon for a Ratel crew to unwittingly drive atop an insurgent bunker, which collapsed under the weight of their vehicle and rendered it immobile. More frequently, Ratels were surrounded and cut off by PLAN defenders after bogging down in trenches. This necessitated their being towed out with recovery vehicles or other Ratels, often under heavy fire. PLAN training camps were defended by a number of ZU-23-2 anti-aircraft guns, and these were used in the ground support role with deadly results for immobilised Ratel crews.

During the early 1980s, PLAN carefully re-sited its training camps near Angolan military installations so it could take advantage of the security provided by the attached Angolan armoured and mechanised brigades. This gave PLAN ready access to the logistical and communications infrastructure of its local allies and increased the risk to SADF raids targeting those camps exponentially. The SADF remained conscious of this fact and established a number of improvised anti-tank platoons composed of Ratel-90s to engage Angolan armour if necessary. During Operation Protea and Operation Askari, Ratel-90s were to face Angolan T-34-85, PT-76, and T-54/55 tanks, with mixed results. While the Ratel-90s were for the most part adequate in countering Angola's largely obsolete and second-line Soviet tanks, they remained hindered by mediocre standoff ranges, inferior fire control, and a lack of stabilised main armament. Ratel crews often had to manoeuvre behind the tanks and fire on them from the rear to destroy them. This required intense coordination between the vehicle commanders, who directed each other by radio until they were in a position to concentrate volleys on a tank's exposed side or rear. As the Angolan tank crews were in no position to out-manoeuvre the Ratels, they prioritised mobility kills. A common tactic was to fire a round beneath the Ratel, destroying the differentials on its axles and rendering it immobile. This stripped the Ratel of its most crucial advantage and made it an easy target for the other tanks.

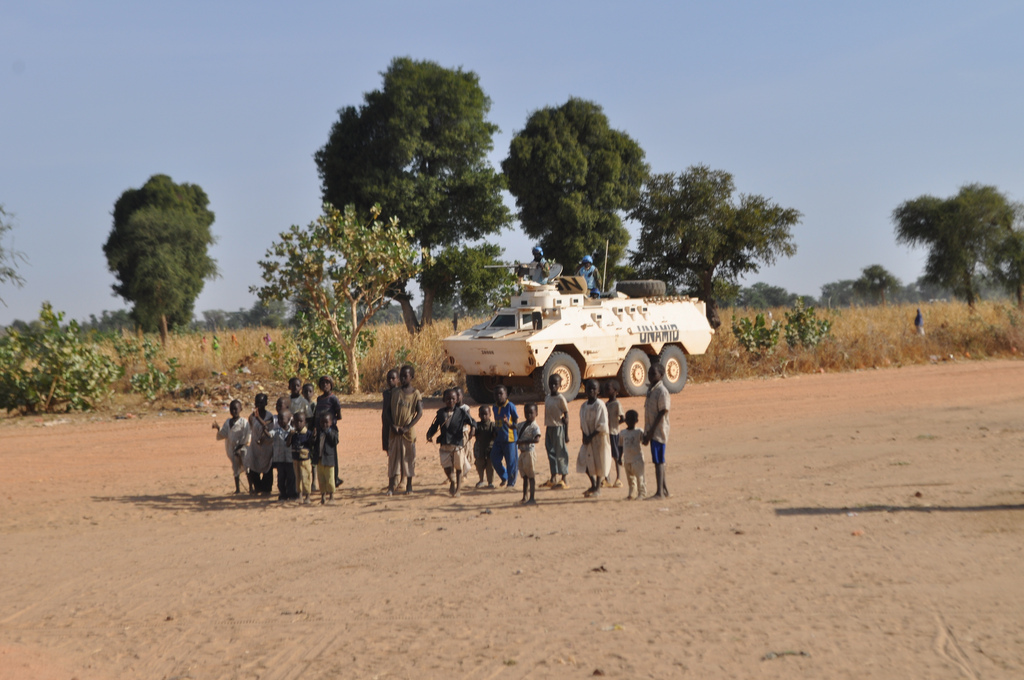
SANDF troops and a Ratel attached to UNAMID in Darfur, 2009.

In the wake of Operation Askari, South African field commanders began complaining that Ratel-90s were being expected to fulfill the role of light tanks rather than serving in their intended role of infantry support. This was a violation of SADF mechanised and armoured doctrine. Consequently, the SADF introduced the Ratel ZT3 anti-tank missile carrier, a Ratel variant designed as a dedicated tank destroyer, in 1987. It was first deployed with marked success against Angolan T-54s during Operation Moduler. The Ratel ZT3 also saw limited action against Cuban T-55s during Operation Excite/Hilti.

The cessation of hostilities with Angola in 1989 and the amalgamation of the SADF into the new South African National Defence Force (SANDF) in 1995 ushered in consistent budget cuts to defence spending, resulting in a reduction of personnel and equipment. At least 354 Ratels were declared surplus to requirements and sold beginning in 2005. Much of the remaining Ratels have been handicapped by the SANDF's limited maintenance budget and inadequate numbers of trained maintenance personnel.

The Ratel was intended to be at least partly superseded in SANDF service by a new eight-wheeled infantry fighting vehicle, the Badger IFV. Work on this project was suspended in 2024 without any being delivered. The South African military is considering options to extend the service of the remaining Ratels following the deferment of the Badger project.

=== Foreign service ===
After 1977, the domestic South African arms industry was driven by the economic realities of a universal arms embargo imposed on the SADF as a result of United Nations Security Council Resolution 418. The embargo deprived the SADF of many new weapons systems available to other major arms importers, curtailed its attempts to obtain defence technology on the open market, and raised the cost of obtaining spare parts and components for its preexisting equipment. While South Africa was able to partly compensate by developing its local arms industry, the SADF's requirements were too small to make the manufacture of a wide range of armaments economically profitable. Defence contractors were compelled to tool up for uneconomical and short production runs of sophisticated hardware, including military vehicles. Furthermore, the domestic manufacture of obsolete equipment items had to be sustained long after their basic technology had become quite dated, simply because no alternatives were available. These unprofitable practices threatened to result in stagnation for the defence sector; firms like Sandock-Austral looked for new ways to gain badly needed funds for future research and development efforts and counter their own rapidly rising production costs. In the early 1980s, South Africa's defence contractors turned to export orders to help create the economy of scale necessary to keep their operations viable. They embarked on a massive international marketing drive which included extensive advertising campaigns and exhibits at arms fairs. As a result, public information on vehicles like the Ratel became more readily available in connection with their manufacturers' marketing efforts.

The Royal Moroccan Army became the first prospective client to show an interest in the Ratel; it was then purchasing arms from a vast array of sources for use in the Western Sahara War. This was pursued as part of a massive re-armament programme being funded through generous military subsidies from Saudi Arabia. Morocco initially made contact with Sandock-Austral after soliciting a French firm, Panhard, for new AML armoured cars. As Panhard was closing its AML production line, it declined the order but referred the Moroccan government to South Africa, where Sandock-Austral was still producing an AML derivative under licence as the Eland. Though extensively modified, the Eland was still familiar to Moroccan crews and maintenance personnel who had been trained by French instructors on the AML. Morocco received the first Elands in 1976 and obligingly placed orders for more vehicles, including a few dozen Ratels, from Sandock-Austral. These were delivered between 1978 and 1980. The Royal Moroccan Army ordered another 80 Ratels in 1979, which were delivered between 1980 and 1981. They were deployed in counter-insurgency operations against the Polisario Front, which captured several Ratel-20s and pressed them into service. In 2016, Morocco was still operating 30 Ratel-20s and 30 Ratel-90s. All of these were the Ratel Mk III variant.

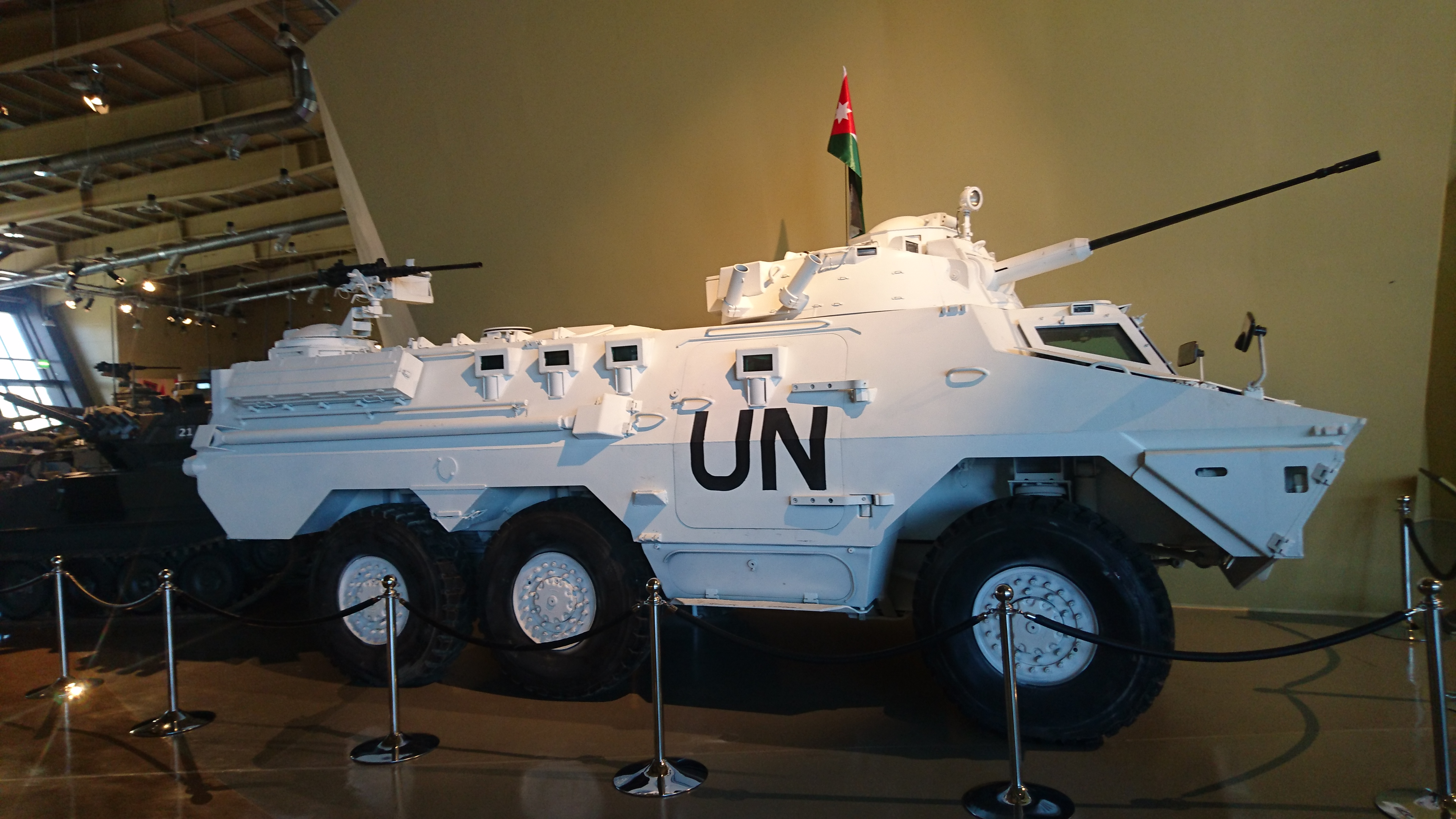
Jordanian Ratel-20 in the Royal Tank Museum, Amman.

Sandock-Austral's attempts to secure new export customers for the Ratel were somewhat curtailed by the passage of United Nations Security Council Resolution 558, which amended the arms embargo to prohibit all member states from importing South African military equipment. At the time production of the Ratel ceased in 1987, no new export orders had been placed. Export of the Ratel only resumed again in the early 2000s, when the SANDF declared hundreds of its own IFVs surplus to requirements and offered them for sale. The chief recipient of these vehicles was the Royal Jordanian Army, which ordered 100 in 2002 and subsequently, another 221 in 2004. The Jordanian government worked closely with a number of South African contractors, such as the Mechanology Design Bureau and Paramount Group, to maintain and refurbish its Ratel fleet. Some Jordanian Ratel-20s have been retrofitted with a new Cummins QSM11-C330 diesel engine developing 329 hp (246 kW). This improved mechanical performance and extended the Ratels' maximum road speed to 110 km/h. The new engine necessitated a relocated engine compartment in the centre of the hull.

A number of Jordanian Ratels were retrofitted with a BAU-23 turret carrying twin 23 mm autocannon. Others may have also been retrofitted with a turret carrying both the original 20 mm autocannon in addition to a bank of ZT3 Ingwe missiles. In addition to service with the Royal Jordanian Army, these modified Ratels were exported in small numbers to Yemen between 2008 and 2011. In Yemeni service, the Ratel was utilised for reconnaissance purposes and essentially fulfilled the role of an armoured car. During the Yemeni Revolution, photographs of Ratels seized by defecting army personnel were circulated in the international press, evoking considerable controversy. The South African government acknowledged that it was notified of Jordan's intention to deliver the vehicles to Yemen, but had not formally consented to their transfer or amended the original end-user agreement, which made no provision for the re-export of Jordanian Ratels to third parties. A similar controversy erupted when Ratels began appearing in Libyan service in 2013, prompting Democratic Alliance defence spokesman David Maynier to call for a formal inquiry into how Libya could have acquired the vehicles without the knowledge of South Africa's National Conventional Arms Control Committee (NCACC). Maynier suggested that Libya, like Yemen, had likely obtained the Ratels from another country in violation of an end-user agreement. Ratels are currently operated by the Libyan National Army, as well as a number of unaffiliated militias such as the Zintan Brigades and the February 17th Martyrs Brigade.

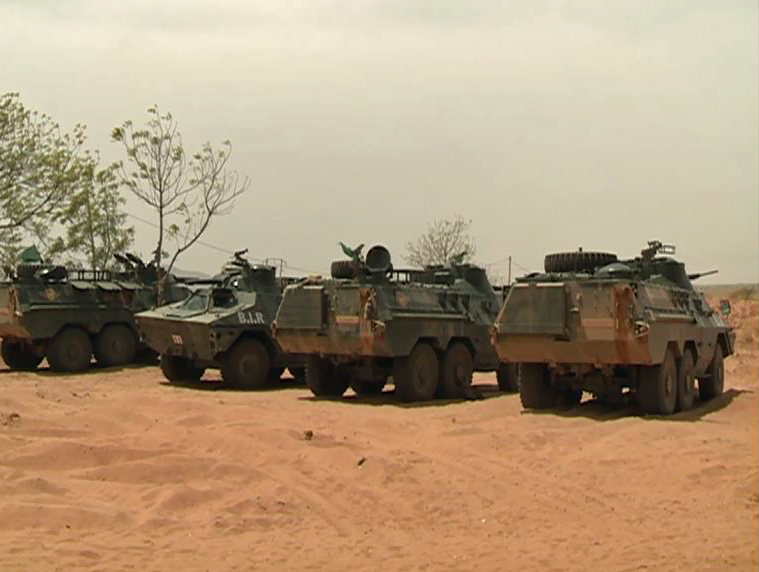
Ratels of the Rapid Intervention Battalion deployed in Far Northern Cameroon in January 2019.

Small quantities of second-hand Ratels have been delivered by the SANDF to a number of other African states, including Ghana, which received 15 Ratel-20s and 24 Ratel-90s in 2004, and Rwanda, which received 15 Ratel-90s and 20 Ratel-60s in 2007. Senegal ordered 26 Ratel-20s in 2008 and had received them by 2010. Zambia also received 20 refurbished ex-SANDF Ratel-20s in 2012. Djibouti purchased 12 Ratel-90s in 2004 from an unknown source. Cameroon's Rapid Intervention Brigade acquired 12 Ratel-20s between 2015 and 2016 for demining operations in areas affected by the Boko Haram insurgency.

In 2007, the SANDF committed to donate up to 18 Ratel-90s to the Central African Republic (CAR) under the auspices of Operation Vimbezela. This effort collapsed due to a variety of unforeseen problems: the SANDF was only willing to supply previously decommissioned Ratel-90s and insisted that the donation was contingent on the Central African government making its own arrangements to have them shipped to Bangui. The latter possessed insufficient funds to restore all the Ratel-90s to serviceable condition or cover the shipping cost. Only 2 were delivered while the remainder were reclaimed by the South African contractor responsible for their refurbishment, citing unpaid shipping fees. Both Ratels arrived without adequate parts, maintenance equipment, or ammunition; nevertheless, they were utilised for training purposes by the SANDF mission in the CAR. At least three local crews were trained between 2010 and 2013, after which the vehicles were formally adopted by the Central African Army. The Ratel-90s were deployed without success against Séléka militants during the country's 2012–2014 civil war. Their inexperienced crews failed to use them effectively in an offensive role, and ammunition shortages became so acute that President François Bozizé made personal appeals to South African officials for additional stocks of 90 mm shells. After the end of the civil war, it was not clear whether the army retained the Ratel-90s or if either was operational. An arms control panel appointed by the UN Security Council reported that they were still in the CAR in July 2014.

The SANDF has also donated Ratels to multinational peacekeeping forces, namely the United Nations Organization Stabilization Mission in the Democratic Republic of the Congo (MONUSCO).

== Description ==
The Ratel was based on a commercial MAN truck chassis, from which many mechanical parts were utilised. Its use of parts otherwise ubiquitous to the civilian automotive industry proved to be an advantage in circumventing the universal arms embargo imposed on South Africa, which extended only to purpose-built military products. The vehicle is not amphibious and is not fitted with an NBC overpressure system. Most production model Ratels did not have any specialised night vision equipment. As an interim measure, the SADF occasionally issued Ratel crews with night vision goggles, which aided navigation in the Angolan bush where the use of headlamps was precluded due to proximity to enemy positions. This was impractical for night fighting as muzzle flashes could blind the crew and the bulky goggles hampered movement and reaction speed in the turret. In the 1990s, Denel Land Systems developed night sights which could be fitted on new Ratel-20 turrets or retrofitted on older turrets.

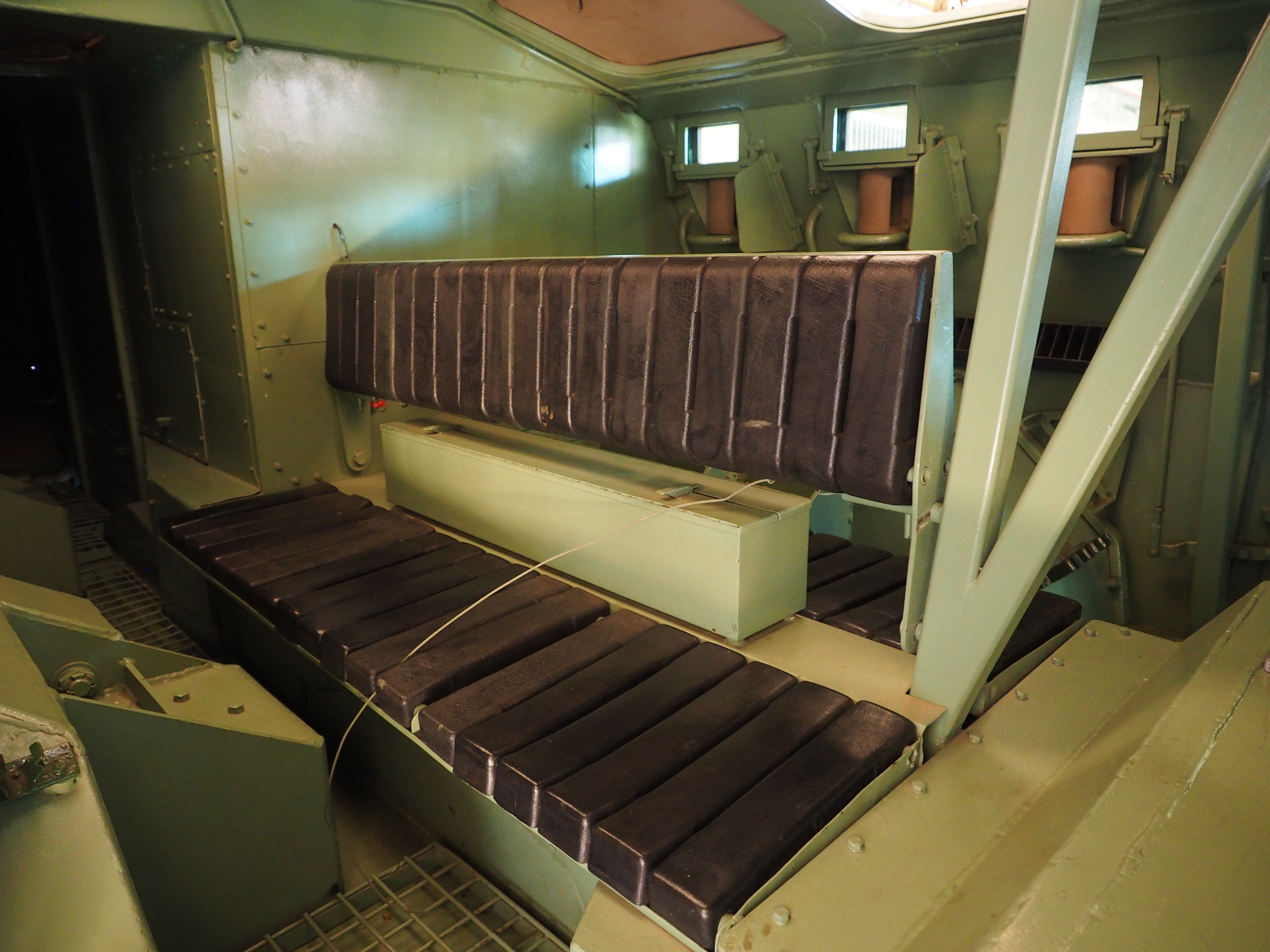
Seats inside a retired Ratel-20

The Ratel possesses rear-mounted engine and fighting compartments, while its turret ring and driving compartment are located towards the front of the vehicle. It has a long, box-shaped hull with slightly sloped vertical sides and rear. The hull is of all-welded construction, with a maximum armour thickness of 20 mm on the hull front. Each Ratel hull is protected against 7.62×39mm armour-piercing ammunition at any angle; it is also capable of stopping 12.7×108mm armour-piercing ammunition on the frontal arc. The bottom of the hull structure is blastproof and vee-shaped to deflect mine explosions away from the passengers and crew. Ratels frequently detonated stacked anti-tank mines during the South African Border War with little injury to their occupants and minimal drive train damage. On many occasions they were able to keep moving after basic field repairs. Anti-tank mines common in Angola, such as the TMA-3, could destroy a Ratel's axles and occasionally damage its gearbox, but almost never penetrated its hull.

The Ratel's crew consists of a section commander, driver, turret gunner, and rear gunner. In addition to the crew, an attached infantry section of nine is carried in the fighting compartment of the vehicle. There are three firing ports with vision blocks on either side of the fighting compartment. Passenger capacity may be reduced to six or seven if additional ammunition racks or radio equipment is carried. The infantry section debarks from three large, pneumatically sealed doors on either side of the hull and at the rear; it is also provided with five forward access hatches on the hull roof.

The driver is seated at the front centre of the Ratel and provided with three bulletproof windscreens for use in a combat environment. This design feature was adopted directly from the Berliet VXB-170 and favoured for its enhanced situational awareness. The windscreens are fitted with armoured shutters which could be closed down as needed. Three vision periscopes are provided for the driver. The Ratel's steering system is mechanical, with hydraulic assistance.

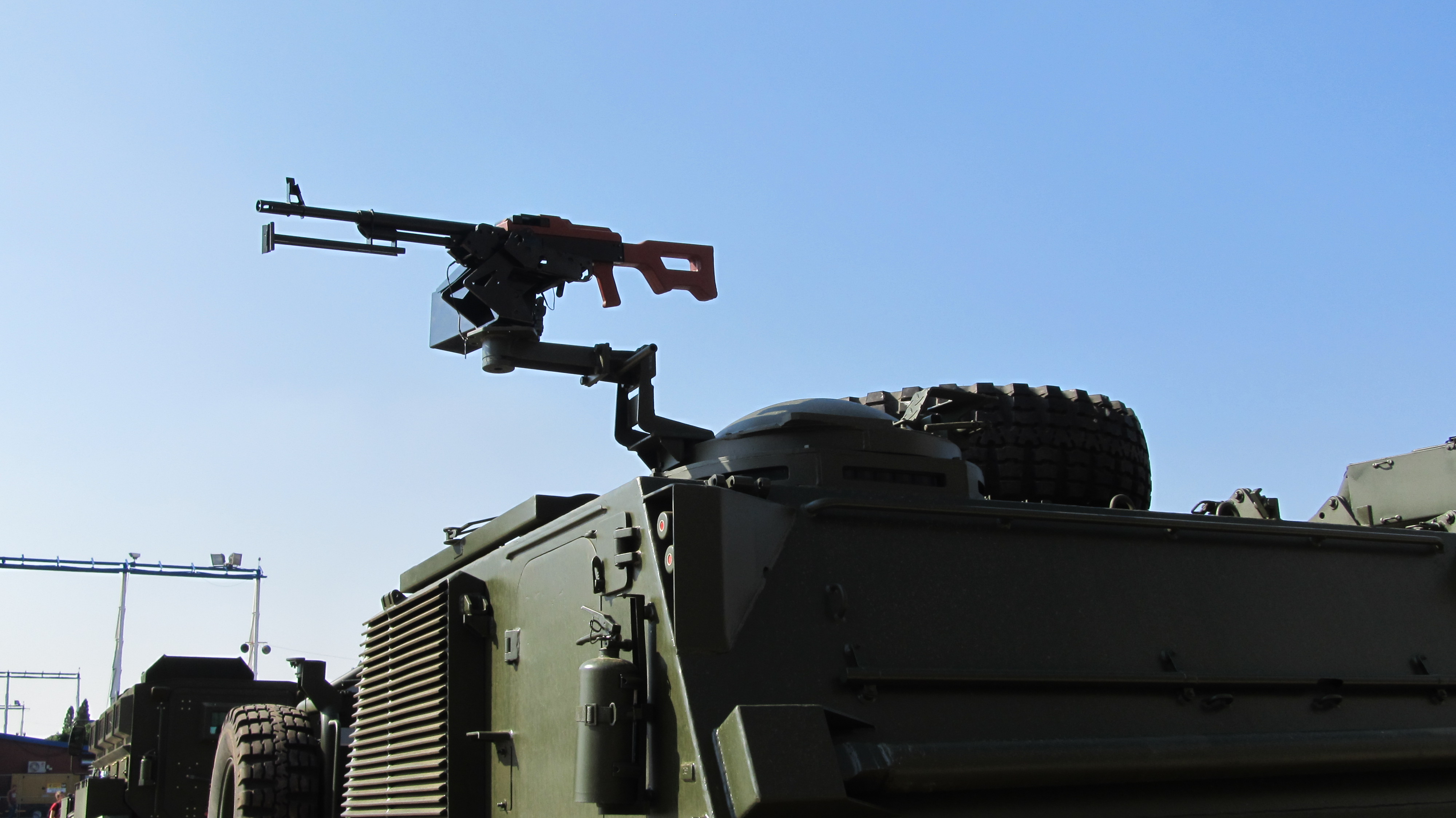
One of the unique features of the Ratel's design was the pintle-mounted machine gun at the hull rear, which was used for anti-aircraft purposes by the vehicle crew.

Ratel turrets are located towards the front of the vehicle, directly behind the driving compartment, and house two crew members: the section commander to the left and the turret gunner to the right. Both crew members are provided with roof hatches; the commander is also afforded a domed cupola with vision blocks. The commander and gunner have nine day periscopes for all-round observation. The Ratel's standard armament is a 20 mm F2 M693 automatic cannon manufactured under licence as the Denel GI-2. The autocannon may be elevated to a maximum of +38° for use against low-flying, fixed wing aircraft and helicopters. It has a selector switch used to alternate between three rates of fire—semi-automatic, limited burst, or fully automatic—and is belt fed from two ammunition chutes in the turret. The dual-feed system allows the gunner to swap between different projectile types fed from either chute as needed. Two types of ammunition can be selected: a high-explosive (HE) round with a range of 2,000 metres, or an armour-piercing tungsten carbide (APTC) round with a range of 1,000 metres. The HE rounds have a muzzle velocity of 1,050 m/s, while the armour-piercing round has an initial muzzle velocity of 1,300 m/s and penetration of 20mm of rolled homogeneous armour at an incidence of 60°.

The GI-2 can achieve a cyclic rate of fire of 700 to 750 rounds per minute and 1,200 rounds of 20 mm ammunition are carried on board. It provides the Ratel with a close support and anti-armour capability which proved sufficient to engage Angolan BTR-60 APCs and light armoured cars such as the BRDM-2 at long range. While the autocannon is generally impotent against heavier armour, well-directed fire or exceptional shots are capable of damaging a tank's external features, especially its sights. During Operation Moduler, one Ratel commander directed a stream of 20 mm APTC rounds at an Angolan T-55 at close range, which apparently penetrated a vulnerable margin in its armour and caused a catastrophic kill after igniting the on-board ammunition.

A co-axial 7.62 mm Browning M1919 machine gun is mounted to the left of the main armament on nearly all variants of the Ratel. Aside from the co-axial machine gun, a second 7.62 mm Browning M1919 is carried at the rear of the vehicle's hull for anti-aircraft purposes. Both the Ratel-60 and Ratel-90 are also armed with a third 7.62 mm M1919 on their turret roofs. A maximum of 6,000 rounds of 7.62 mm ammunition are carried within the vehicle.

The Ratel is powered by a six-cylinder, liquid-cooled, turbocharged D 3256 BTXF diesel engine. This is housed in an engine compartment at the rear left of the hull and coupled to a fully automatic RENK HSU 106 automatic gearbox with six forward and two reverse gear ratios. The gearbox can be operated manually and has a mechanical emergency gearshift. Drive is transmitted to the Ratel's three axles in two stages, with final reduction being achieved by epicyclic gearing in the wheel hubs. The three axles have their own locking differentials and longitudinal differential locks. There are hydropneumatic shock dampers at each wheel station.

== Variants ==
Variant	Description	Comment	Image
Ratel 20	Original version	French-designed turret 20 mm Denel Land Systems GI-2	Ratel 20 IFV
Ratel 60	Crew of 3 + 7 infantry	Turret is identical to that of the Eland 60 with a 60 mm (2.4 in) breech-loading mortar	Ratel 60 Mortar Platform
Ratel 81	No turret	An 81 mm (3.2 in) mortar is installed in the crew compartment for use as a fire support platform	Ratel 81 mortar carrier
Ratel 90	crew of 3 plus 6 infantry	Turret armed with a 90mm Denel GT-2 cannon, identical to that of the Eland 90. Primary role: fire support for the Mechanized Battalions	Ratel 90 mm
Ratel 120	120 mm (4.7 in) mortar carrier	Prototype only	
Ratel Command	Crew of 9 men	Two-seater turret with a 12.7 mm .50 BMG.	Ratel Command
Ratel EAOS	Enhanced Artillery Observation System	Artillery Support	Ratel Enhanced Artillery Observation System
Ratel Maintenance	Mobile workshop		
Ratel ZT3	Anti-tank guided missile turret	A launcher containing 3 x ZT3 Ingwe laser guided missiles and additional missiles stored within the hull	Ratel IFC ZT3
Ratel Logistic	8x8 logistic vehicle	Only 2 prototypes were built	Ratel Log prototype
Ratel AA	Anti-aircraft platform	Jordanian variant only, modified by KADDB before entering service with the JAF. New turret armed with a twin 23mm cannon removed from Ukrainian supplied BTR-94	Ratel anti aircraft Jordan

== Derivatives ==
- Iklwa - A prototype built by BAE Systems Land Systems South Africa that is based on the Ratel but with the hull and drive train upgraded and the engine moved from the rear to the front

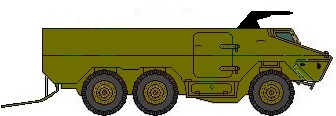

== Operators ==
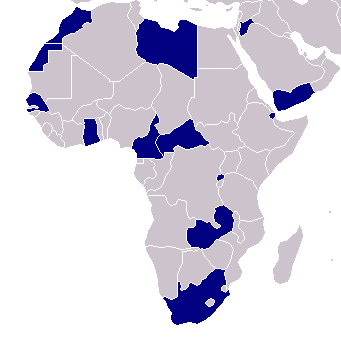
Map of Ratel operators in blue

- Cameroon: 12
- Central African Republic: 2
- Djibouti: 16-20
- Ghana: 39
- Jordan: 321
- Libya
- Morocco: 60
- Rwanda: 35
- Sahrawi Arab Democratic Republic
- Senegal: 26
- South Africa: 534 in service, 666 in reserve
- Yemen
- Zambia: 14

== See also ==
=== Vehicles of comparable role, performance, and era ===
- SIBMAS – (Belgium)
- Berliet VXB-170 – (France)
- EE-11 Urutu – (Brazil)
