= SIBMAS =

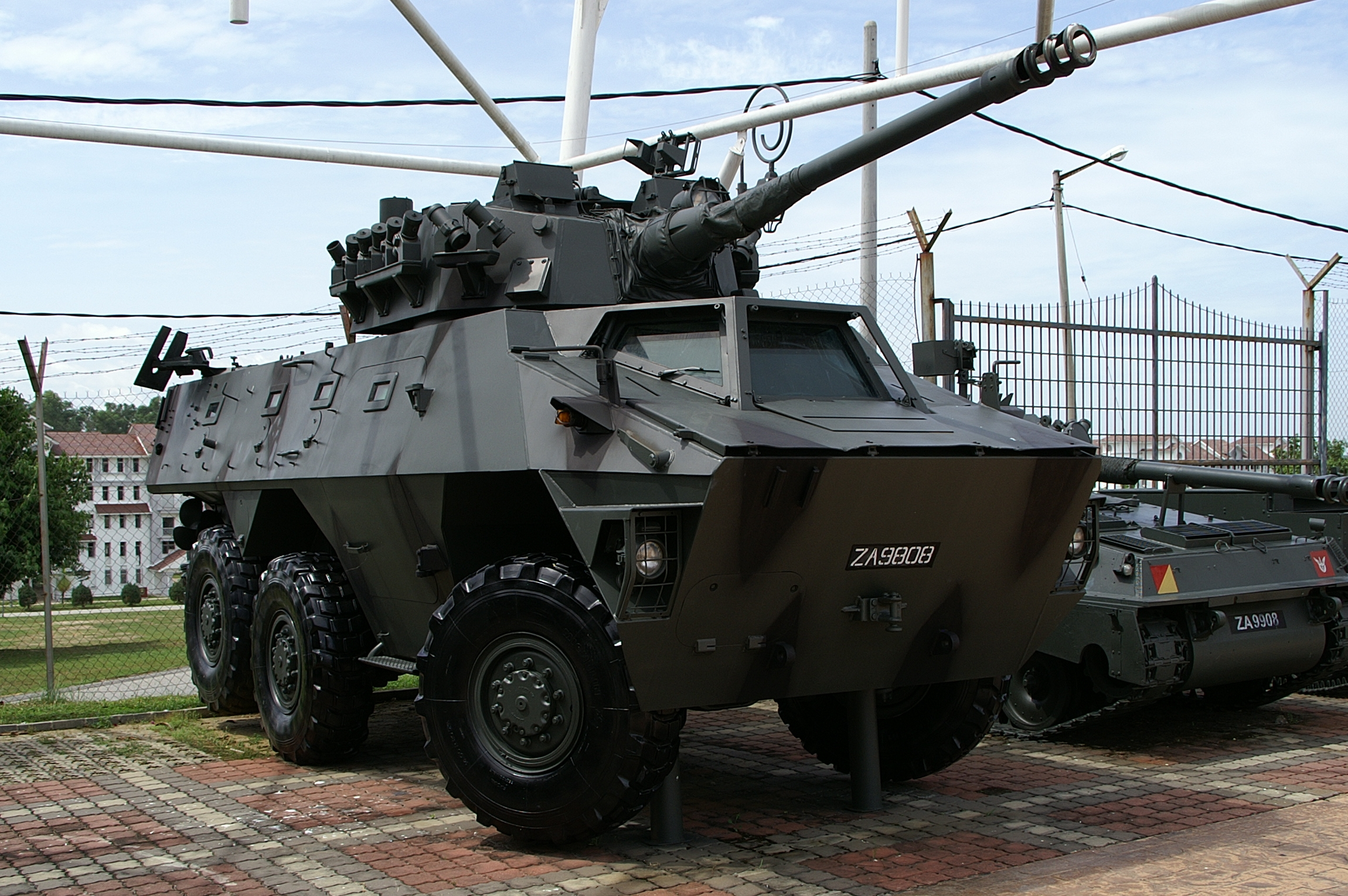
- SIBMAS AFSV-90 at the Malaysian Army Museum, Port Dickson.
- Type: Infantry fighting vehicle
- Place of origin: Belgium

Service history
- Used by: See Operator
- Wars: Communist insurgency in Malaysia (1968–89)

Production history
- Designer: Büssing
- Designed: March, 1972 (initial prototype); 1975 (SIBMAS)
- Manufacturer: BN Constructions Ferroviaires et Metalliques
- Unit cost: US$307,800 (new, unarmed)
- Produced: 1981 – 1985
- No. built: 199
- Variants: See Variants

Specifications
- Mass: 16.5 tonnes (18.2 short tons; 16.2 long tons)
- Length: 7.32 m (24 ft 0 in)
- Width: 2.5 m (8 ft 2 in)
- Height: 2.24 m (7 ft 4 in) (hull)
- Crew: 3 (commander, driver, gunner) + 11 passengers
- Main armament: 90mm Cockerill Mk.III
- Secondary armament: 7.62 mm FN MAG machine gun
- Engine: MAN Diesel D 2566 MK six-cylinder water-cooled diesel 320 hp (205 kW) at 1,900 rpm
- Power/weight: 20 hp/tonne (14.9 kW/tonne)
- Ground clearance: 0.4m
- Fuel capacity: 400 litres
- Operational range: 1,000 km
- Maximum speed: 100 km/h

The SIBMAS is a Belgian amphibious infantry fighting vehicle. It was engineered from the same prototype as the South African Ratel. The SIBMAS was developed between 1975 and 1976 at a department of the BN Constructions Ferroviaires et Metalliques in Nivelles. Production was on an order-by-order basis and commenced only for the Malaysian Army.

The Malaysian Army is due to replace it completely under the Next Generation Wheeled Armoured Vehicle project.

== Development history ==
During the early 1970s, the South African Defence Force issued a requirement for a wheeled infantry fighting vehicle (IFV) capable of deploying troops rapidly across the vast expanses of southern Africa. IFVs such as the Soviet BMP-1 and West German Marder had traditionally been tracked; wheeled designs were generally rejected because they lacked the same weight-carrying capacity and off-road mobility of their tracked counterparts. However, South African military strategists favoured a wheeled design for logistical reasons, as it reduced maintenance costs and simplified field repairs. Excessive track wear was also an issue in the region's abrasive, sandy terrain, making a wheeled configuration for an IFV more attractive. The only other requirements were that the South African IFV was to be capable of mounting a two-man turret system. In March 1972, a prototype known as the Springfield-Büssing Buffel was completed and evaluated in trials in the Namib Desert. The Springfield-Büssing Buffel was a six-wheeled design which was engineered by a South African subsidiary of Büssing. It incorporated a boatlike hull with a sharply sloped frontal glacis plate, similar to the EE-11 Urutu, and was built on a commercial MAN truck chassis. The prototype was later altered with a front hull and driving compartment directly inspired by the Berliet VXB-170; in this form it was accepted for service as the Ratel.

While the Ratel was still under development, a Belgian defence contractor, BN Constructions Ferroviaires et Metalliques became interested in developing a multi-role, wheeled armoured vehicle for the export market. The company had prior experience producing armoured vehicles under licence during the early stages of World War II and the immediate postwar era, when it was known as SA La Brugeoise et Nivelles. By 1974, it had consolidated its research and development of new armoured vehicles into a new division, the Société Industrielle Belge de Matériel Automobile Spécial (SIBMAS). The SIBMAS division was tasked with creating a wheeled armoured vehicle capable of transporting between 9 and 16 mounted infantrymen. It was always intended as more than a simple armoured personnel carrier (APC) or IFV, however. The parent firm wanted the SIBMAS series to include a family of supporting vehicles built on the same chassis and hull to simplify logistics for potential export clients. The SIBMAS prototype had to be capable of fulfilling at least four requirements, one for a general APC, one for a turreted IFV, one for a dedicated fire support vehicle, and one for an internal security vehicle to be used for riot control.

In 1975, the SIBMAS division negotiated the rights to the original Springfield-Büssing Buffel prototype from Büssing, including the study which had resulted in its development. Work on an improved derivative began that year and had been completed by the end of 1976. In terms of external design, the new prototype was identical to the Ratel, but possessed a lighter, watertight hull and could be modified for amphibious purposes. The vehicle was simply identified by the anagram of its parent division. Initial trials were carried out that year in Belgium, and later in Malaysia and the Philippines, to test mechanical performance in tropical climates. It was announced that serial production would not commence until an export order was finalised to create the economy of scale necessary to justify production costs. Two fully amphibious demonstrators were built between 1976 and 1979, one which was propelled through water by its wheels at a speed of 5 km/h and a second with twin swivel-mounted propellers which could reach speeds of 10 km/h.

The Ratel entered serial production in South Africa around the same time the SIBMAS was first being showcased publicly, leading to allegations that their development was directly linked. The obvious similarities between the two vehicle designs led military scholars to conclude that one must be a licensed variant of the other. For instance, Jane's Defence Weekly initially speculated that the Ratel and SIBMAS were the same vehicle, and that South Africa had worked in concert with the Belgian contractor to oversee its development.

In 1979, the Malaysian Army embarked on a massive modernisation programme known as Perkembangan Istimewa Angkatan Tentera (PERISTA), intended to increase the firepower and mobility of its mechanized forces in light of the ongoing communist insurgency and the growing threat of a regional conflict between Thailand and Vietnam. Malaysian mechanized units were then equipped largely with the obsolete Panhard M3, as well as smaller numbers of the V-100 Commando. Both of these were general purpose APCs, which the army was essentially using in the role of IFVs during counter-insurgency operations. The need for a dedicated IFV to permit Malaysian infantrymen to fight mounted in addition to providing direct fire support through its integral weapons systems was identified as early as 1977. The only initial requirements were that the proposed IFV was to be suitable for both counter-insurgency and "high intensity", or conventional warfare.

Beginning in 1979, the Malaysian Army trialled several wheeled IFV designs from defence contractors in the US, Brazil, and Europe, including one of the two amphibious SIBMAS prototypes. The evaluation process was beset by numerous delays, since the army's procurement officials initially failed to specify any additional technical requirements for its future IFV programme. When the army finally came up with a series of specific technical requirements, for example a maximum road range of 1,000 kilometres and a combat weight of 12 tonnes, it altered them without notifying the contractors. No sufficiently detailed request for tender documents were issued. This resulted in confusion among the contractors, most of whom wrote to the Malaysian Ministry of Defence requesting formal clarification of the army's needs. In light of the situation, the evaluation period was extended through early 1981, when the army identified the SIBMAS, EE-11 Urutu, and Condor as the most promising candidates. In May 1981, the Malaysian Ministry of Defence announced it would accept both the SIBMAS and Condor for service, with the SIBMAS being adopted primarily as a fire support vehicle. Controversy immediately erupted over allegations that the tendering process had been rigged so that the fire support specifications for the IFV programme could only be met by the SIBMAS. These allegations led to a formal review of the SIBMAS procurement by the Malaysian National Investigations Bureau, and the army was forced to re-open its tender accordingly. Malaysia was also vilified by international and domestic anti-apartheid movements for its acquisition of the SIBMAS, which they suspected erroneously to have been licensed to South Africa as the Ratel in violation of United Nations Security Council Resolution 418.

The Malaysian government subsequently placed an order in late 1981 for 186 SIBMAS vehicles, as part of an $84 million deal with BN Constructions Ferroviaires et Metalliques. About 162 were produced in a fire support configuration with turret-mounted 90mm guns, while the remainder were purpose-built recovery vehicles with power winches and folding cranes. The army had requested 1,000 new APCs and IFVs in 1979, but this was later reduced to 600 due to cost of installing additional upgrades and equipment to the vehicles. About 400 Condors were ordered, meaning no more than 200 of the SIBMAS vehicles could be acquired within the army's budget. That number was further reduced to 186 when the expense of the 90mm guns and turret systems, which had to be purchased from Cockerill Maintenance & Ingénierie, a third party contractor, were taken into account. BN Constructions Ferroviaires et Metalliques used the Malaysian order to partially subsidise the construction of a new factory to manufacture the SIBMAS.

Manufacturing rights to the SIBMAS design were later transferred to Cockerill Maintenance & Ingénierie; however, no further orders were received and production ceased accordingly. Cockerill also took possession of 3 SIBMAS prototypes and another 10 completed vehicles which had been produced at the factory, possibly in anticipation of future export orders. These continued to be used as demonstrators for Cockerill's line of low-pressure turret systems as late as 2016.

== Service history ==
The adoption of the SIBMAS was greeted with some initial skepticism in the Malaysian Army. The Malaysian Royal Armoured Corps was skeptical of the need for a wheeled fire support vehicle attached to the mechanized infantry, which it criticised as a poor substitute for the acquisition of main battle tanks. The SIBMAS had also failed to meet several of the army's technical requirements. Its combat weight hovered close to 17 tonnes, while the procurement staff had specified a vehicle with a combat weight not to exceed 12 tonnes (later raised to 15 tonnes for 6X6 IFVs). The Malaysian general staff had also been adamant it would only purchase an IFV with a proven production and sales record to avoid teething problems with a new product. However, the SIBMAS existed only in prototype form at the time of its adoption and had not yet seen operational service with the armed forces of another nation. The Brazilian Engesa EE-11 Urutu was seen by some of the procurement staff as a more suitable candidate for the army's needs, albeit modified for the IFV and fire support role: it was considerably cheaper than the SIBMAS, it had been combat tested in the Iran–Iraq War and had been in uninterrupted production for several years, and could meet the weight requirements. Proponents of the Urutu claimed that the SIBMAS was also belatedly entered into competition with the Urutu and other vehicles once the tender had already been closed.

In the late 1970s, the Malaysian Army did not possess any IFVs, and its wheeled armoured vehicles were either light armoured cars such as the Ferret and the Panhard AML, or general purpose APCs such as the V-100 and Panhard M3. These were deployed in counter-insurgency operations essentially as stopper groups, with their crews using the mobility of their vehicles to encircle guerrilla positions and cut off escape routes while the infantry debarked to engage the enemy. However, none of these vehicles could carry large numbers of embarked infantrymen or permit them to fight mounted. Along with fire support variants of the V-150, which Malaysia had acquired in 1977, the SIBMAS essentially replaced the AML and Ferret in the role of an armoured car attached to infantry formations. The Malaysian Army continued to use APCs as generic "battle taxis" for the infantry, and adopted the Condor for this purpose.

Once the SIBMAS order had been fulfilled, the Malaysian Army experienced difficulty in integrating the vehicle as planned due to a shortage of trained crews. It announced that all SIBMAS vehicles would be consolidated into a single armoured cavalry regiment between 1986 and 1990, as new intakes of crews were being progressively trained.

The collapse of the domestic communist insurgency, coupled with the subsequent end of the Cold War and decline in regional tensions, resulted in major cuts to Malaysian defence spending. During the early 1990s, the army found it difficult to keep its SIBMAS fleet operational as funding for spare parts was severely limited.

In April 2016, the Malaysian government announced it would be looking into an extensive upgrade programme for its SIBMAS fleet, indicating the vehicle would remain in service for the foreseeable future. However, other sources maintain that the SIBMAS is being gradually retired and replaced by the eight-wheeled DefTech AV8.

In January 2023, all the Malaysian SIBMAS-based recovery vehicles were retired from service.

== Design ==
The long, box-shaped SIBMAS hull is of all-welded steel construction and provides the crew with protection from small arms fire and artillery fragments. Most SIBMAS variants possess a horizontal roofline, which slopes inwards at the rear. The engine compartment is located in the rear hull and to the left. Engine components are removed through the hull roof for servicing. Passengers may debark from a large door in the rear hull to the right. Entry doors and firing ports are also present in the sides of the vehicle, and there are three hull roof hatches for observation purposes. Drivers are seated at the front of the vehicle and provided with a single hatch cover and three large windows. The turret of the SIBMAS AFSV-90 is located near the hull front, immediately behind the driving compartment, and is provided with three large rectangular hatches.

The SIBMAS was built with power-assisted steering, automatic transmission, and run-flat tyres. It could also be fitted with night vision sights, a nuclear biological and chemical (NBC) protection suite, an electrical air conditioning system, heater, and a winch.

Without additional hull ammunition stowage, the SIBMAS could accommodate a maximum of sixteen passengers.

== Variants ==
- SIBMAS AFSV-90 ( Armoured Fire Support Vehicle ): Standard production model. Armed with a two-man CM-90 turret and Cockerill Mk. III 90mm cannon, one co-axial 7.62mm machine gun, and a roof-mounted 7.62mm machine gun. There are eight smoke dischargers on either side of the turret. An AFSV-90 was also offered with a DEFA D921 90mm low-pressure cannon and turret adopted from the Panhard AML-90 armoured car; this did not enter production.
- SIBMAS ARV ( Armoured Recovery Vehicle ): SIBMAS modified as an armoured recovery vehicle, including a large winch capable of supporting loads up to 20,000 kg, a crane capable of hoisting loads of 10,500 kg, and front and rear blades.

A menagerie of other variants were also offered for export but not adopted. This included a SIBMAS with a 30mm RARDEN autocannon, an anti-aircraft variant with twin 20mm autocannon, an anti-tank variant with a bank of HOT or MILAN missiles, a mortar carrier with the Brandt 60 mm LR Gun-mortar, a cargo transporter, a command vehicle, an armoured personnel carrier with a single 12.7mm heavy machine gun, and an ambulance with four litters.

In 2010, a SIBMAS was showcased mounting an LCTS90 weapon system by Cockerill. This variant is armed with a new 90mm medium-pressure gun capable of firing the Ukrainian-built Falarick 90 anti-tank guided missile.

== Operator ==
- Malaysia

- Malaysian Army: 186
- 162 SIBMAS AFSV-90
- 24 SIBMAS ARV (all ARV retired in 2023)
