= 3rd Armoured Personnel Carrier Squadron =

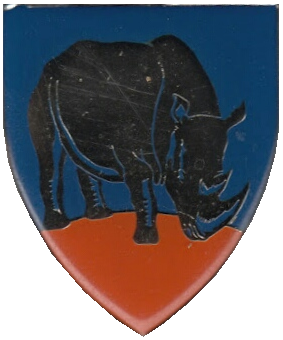
- 3rd Armoured Personnel Carrier Squadron emblem
- Active: 1980 -1985?
- Allegiance: Republic of South Africa
- Branch: South African Army
- Type: Armoured Regiment
- Part of: South African Infantry Corps; Army Conventional Reserve
- Garrison/HQ: Kensington, Johannesburg
- Equipment: Ratel IFV, Buffel APC

3rd Armoured Personnel Carrier Squadron was a detachment of 'Ratel IFVs' operating from Johannesburg in the 1980s.

The Squadron resorted under command of Group 18 in the 1980s trading buffel drivers for Commando units during the state of emergency.
