= United Nations Security Council Resolution 591 =

United Nations Security Council resolution

UN Security Council Resolution 591
- South Africa
- Date: 28 November 1986
- Meeting no.: 2,723
- Code: S/RES/591 (Document)
- Subject: South Africa
- Voting summary: 15 voted for; None voted against; None abstained
- Result: Adopted

Security Council composition
- Permanent members: China; France; Soviet Union; United Kingdom; United States
- Non-permanent members: Australia; Bulgaria; Congo; Denmark; Ghana; Madagascar; Thailand; Trinidad and Tobago; United Arab Emirates; Venezuela

United Nations Security Council resolution 591, adopted unanimously on 28 November 1986, after recalling resolutions 418 (1977), 421 (1977), 473 (1980) and 558 (1984), the Council strengthened the mandatory arms embargo against apartheid South Africa imposed by Resolution 418, and made it more comprehensive. Resolution 591 sought to clarify vague terms from previous resolutions on the topic.

The Council recognised the struggle of the South African people, calling for the establishment of a democratic state with full civil and political rights as enshrined in the Universal Declaration of Human Rights (1948). It also condemned the "racist regime" in South Africa for its repression against opponents of apartheid, killing demonstrators, holding of political prisoners and defiance of Security Council and General Assembly resolutions.

The resolution urged Member States to ensure that components of embargoed items did not reach South Africa through third countries, including spare parts for aircraft and other military equipment belonging to South Africa, and any items which other countries may feel are destined for use by the South African police force or military. Items included aircraft, aircraft engines or parts, electronic and telecommunications equipment, computers and four-wheel drive vehicles. In terms of "arms and related material" from Resolution 418, this included nuclear, strategic and conventional weapons, all military and paramilitary police vehicles and equipment and other related material. The Council urged particularly against any cooperation in the nuclear field.

The Council then went on to urge Member States to not receive any imports of arms, ammunition or military vehicles from South Africa, asking those that had not yet done so to put an end to all exchanges and visits, including by government personnel. It also requested Member States, and those who are not a member of the United Nations, to not participate in any activities in the country that may contribute to South Africa's military capability, ensuring national legislation should reflect this. However, some states still continued to cooperate with the South African regime: Israel and the military dictatorship of Chile provided arms, whereas the Paraguayan dictatorship allowed Paraguay to be used as a third country through which goods were delivered. Also, as many UN member states observed the resolution, non-member states and territories, including Taiwan, saw a rising share of its companies operating in South Africa, though it did not necessarily provide weaponry, due to pressure from other states.

Finally, Resolution 591 called on the Secretary-General Javier Pérez de Cuéllar to report on the progress of the implementation of the current resolution by no later than 30 June 1987.

Though the resolution was adopted unanimously, its rulings were voluntary. The sanctions were lifted under Resolution 919 in 1994.

== See also ==
- Academic boycott of South Africa
- Disinvestment from South Africa
- Foreign relations of apartheid South Africa
- List of United Nations Security Council Resolutions 501 to 600 (1982–1987)
- Apartheid
- Sporting boycott of South Africa
