= United Nations Security Council Resolution 558 =

UN Security Council Resolution 558
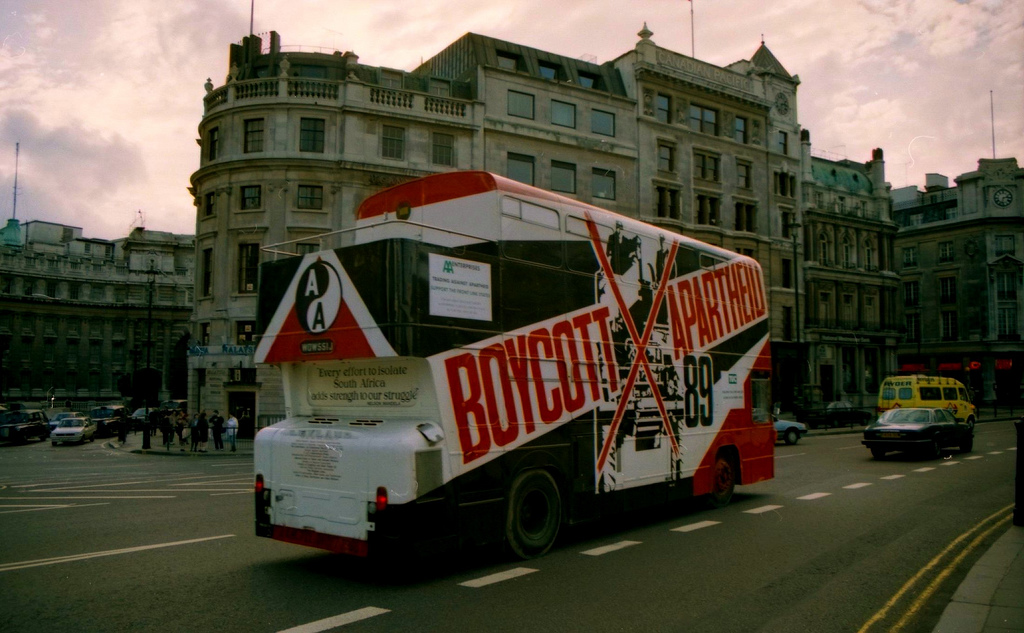
- "Boycott apartheid" bus in London, UK (1989)
- Date: 13 December 1984
- Meeting no.: 2,564
- Code: S/RES/558 (Document)
- Subject: South Africa
- Voting summary: 15 voted for; None voted against; None abstained
- Result: Adopted

Security Council composition
- Permanent members: China; France; Soviet Union; United Kingdom; United States
- Non-permanent members: Burkina Faso; Egypt; India; Malta; Netherlands; Nicaragua; Pakistan; Peru; Ukrainian SSR; Zimbabwe

United Nations Security Council resolution 558, adopted unanimously on 13 December 1984, after recalling resolutions 418 (1977) and 421 (1977) which imposed a compulsory arms embargo on South Africa and established a committee to monitor it, the council stressed the continuing need for all Member States and international organisations to observe the arms embargo.

The council also called for States and organisations not to receive South African made weapons and military vehicles, and requested the Secretary-General to report back on the implementation of the resolution by no later than 31 December 1985.

== See also ==
- List of United Nations Security Council Resolutions 501 to 600 (1982–1987)
- South Africa under apartheid
- United Nations Security Council Resolution 591
