= Berliet VXB-170 =

VXB-170
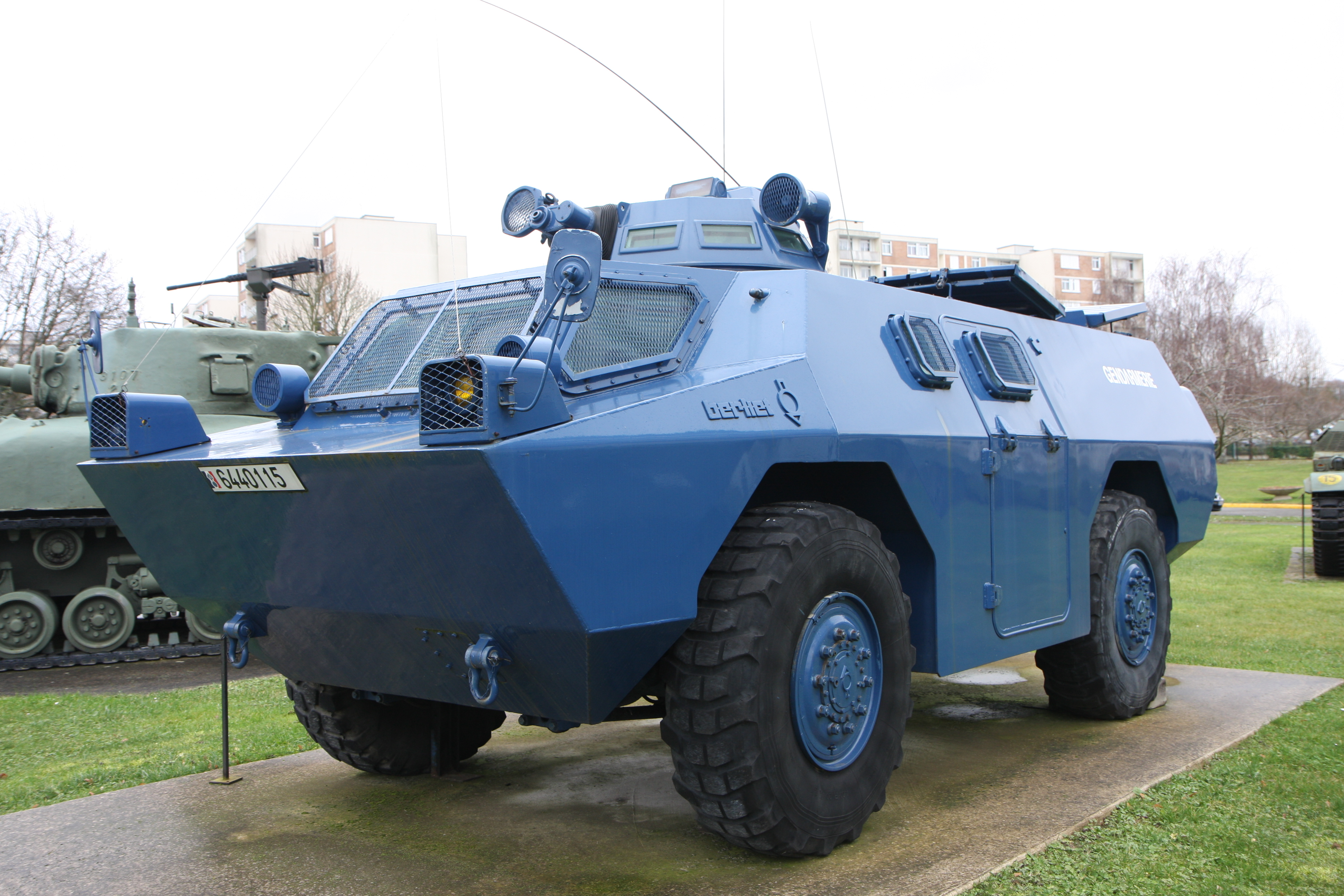
- A French Gendarmerie VXB
- Type: Armoured personnel carrier
- Place of origin: France

Service history
- In service: 1973 – present
- Used by: See Operators

Production history
- Manufacturer: Berliet

Specifications
- Mass: 12.7 tonnes (12.5 long tons)
- Length: 5.99 m (19 ft 8 in)
- Width: 2.5 m (8 ft 2 in)
- Height: 2.05 m (6 ft 9 in)
- Crew: 3
- Passengers: 6 to 8 troops
- Armor: 7 mm
- Main armament: 1 × 7.62 mm machine gun
- Secondary armament: 56 mm grenade launcher
- Engine: Berliet V800M 8-cylinder diesel engine 170 hp (130 kW)
- Power/weight: 23 hp/t
- Suspension: wheeled
- Operational range: 750 km (470 mi)
- Maximum speed: 85 km/h (53 mph)

The Berliet VXB-170 is a four-wheel armoured vehicle used primarily as an internal security vehicle. Developed and initially produced by Berliet until Berliet was merged with Saviem to form Renault Trucks (now Arquus), it lost to the Saviem VAB the competition to equip the French Army, even though it was cheaper than its competitor. Production stopped after fewer than 200 vehicles had been produced.

== History ==
In 1967, the BL-12 was presented as a concept for the French military for transportation.

It was selected in 1972 by the French Gendarmerie, but it lost out to the Saviem VAB the competition for equipment of the French Army. Following the merger of Berliet and Saviem under the Renault brand in 1974, became redundant in the brand product offering so production was stopped soon after the Gendarmerie order was complete.

The VXB-170 was known as Véhicule blindé à roues de la Gendarmerie ("Gendarmerie wheeled armoured vehicle") or VBRG.

== Design ==
The VXB-170 has a V8 170 hp engine has a top speed of 80 km/h. It can cover inclines of 60% and transverse cambers of 30%.

It has a small turret on the roof that can be equipped with a 7.62mm machine gun.

== Variants ==
The VXB-170 was developed under the following:

- internal security (procured by the Gendarmerie in 4 versions : basic vehicle, command vehicle, blade vehicle, and winch vehicle)
- reconnaissance and patrol
- light combat.

== Operators ==
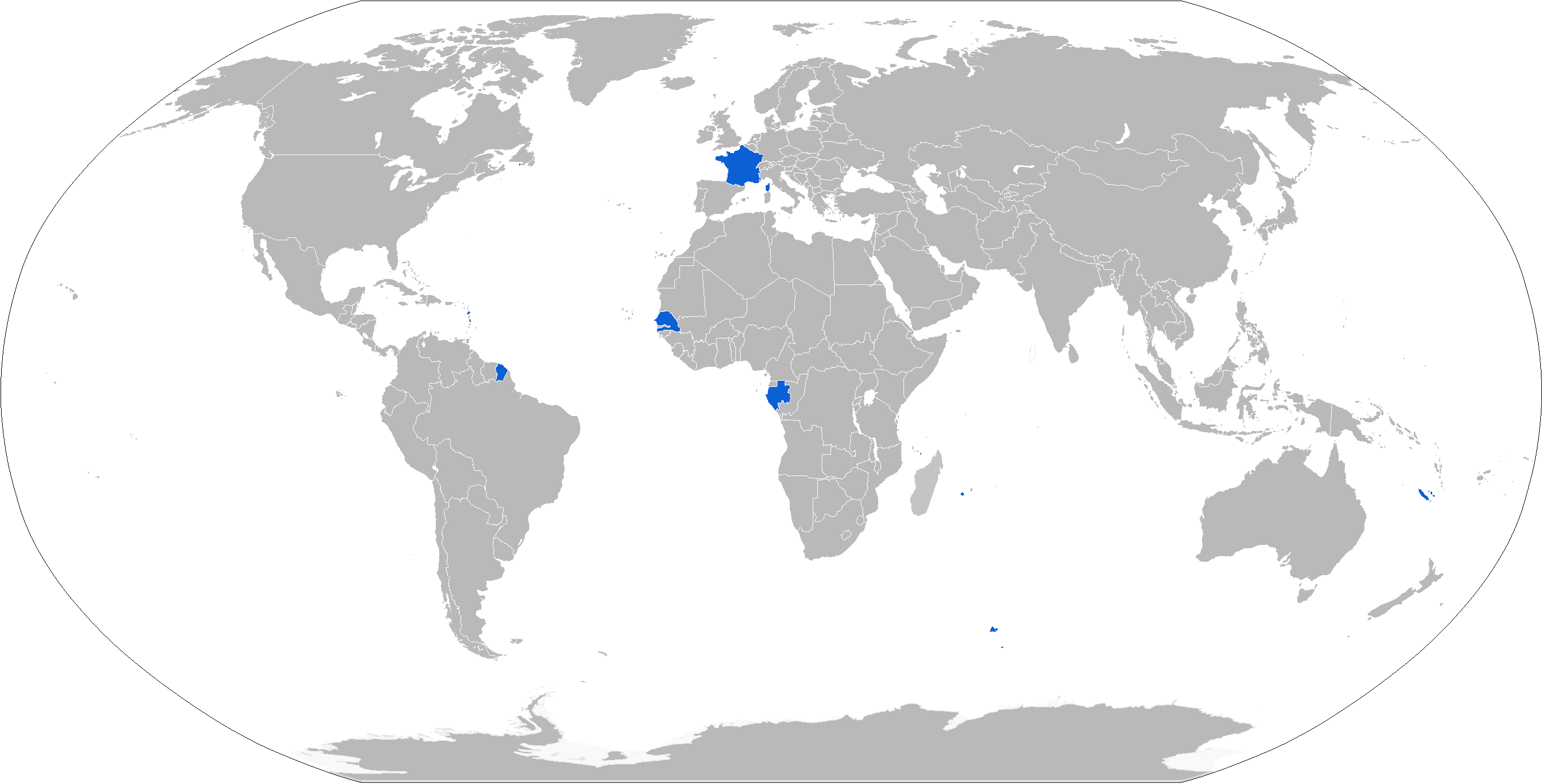
Map of VXB-170 operators

=== Current operators ===
- France - 155 VXBs were procured from 1974 for the mobile units of the French Gendarmerie, of which about 70 remain in service in continental France, Corsica and the French overseas territories (as of 2018). Called "VBRG" (Véhicule Blindé à Roues de la Gendarmerie, "Gendarmerie wheeled armoured vehicle"), it is usually equipped with a 7.62 mm (cal.30) AANF1 machine gun and a 56 mm ALSETEX Cougar grenade launcher. Some vehicles feature a bulldozer blade, others have a winch. They have been deployed by the Gendarmerie in Kosovo and Ivory Coast. They have been also used in both Overseas and Metropolitan France.
- Gabon - 12. 15 reported in service as of 2019.
- Senegal - 12

=== Former civilian operators ===
- Tunisia - 10 (for police, now retired)

=== Former evaluation-only operators ===
- South Africa - 1 (considered for Ratel prototype)

== Gallery ==
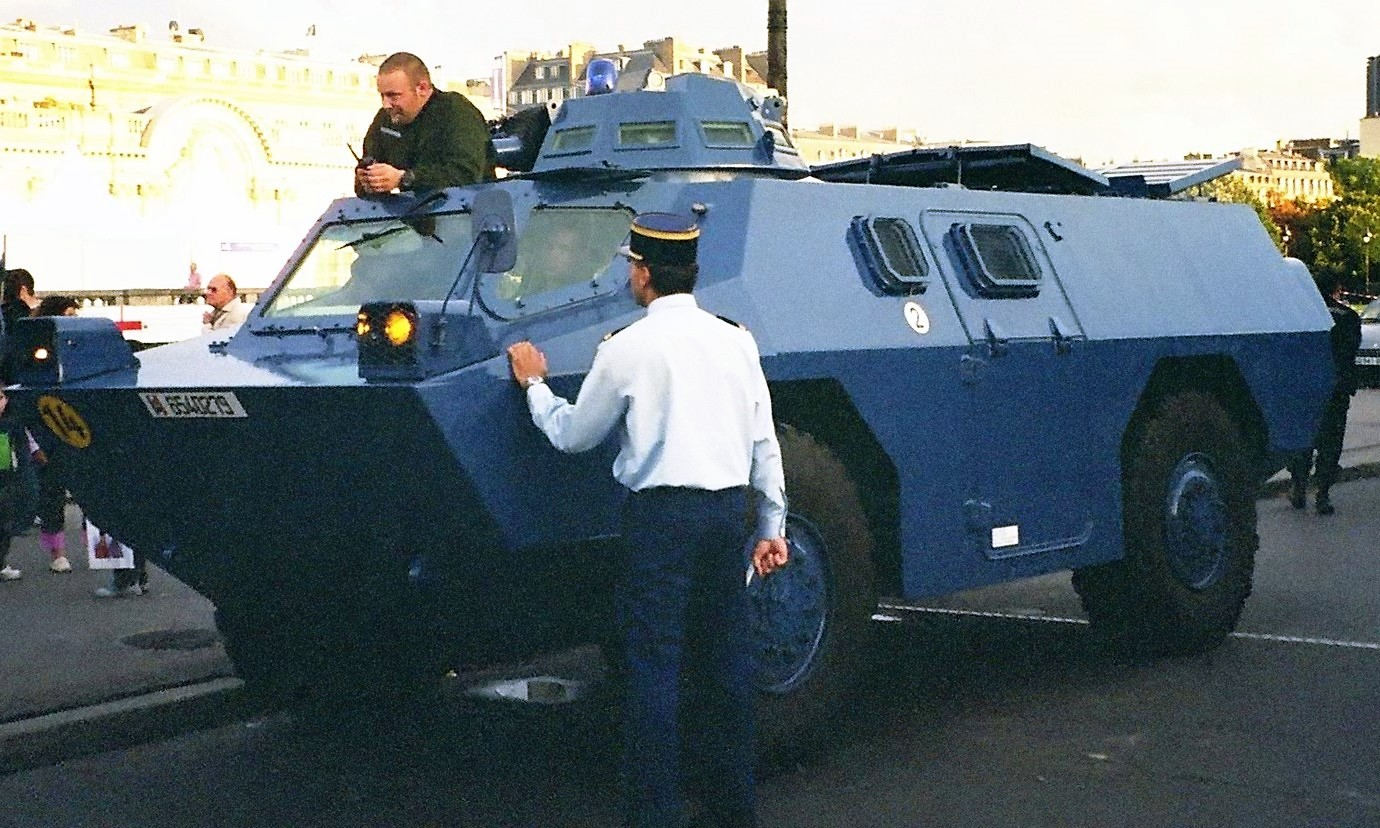
VBRG version

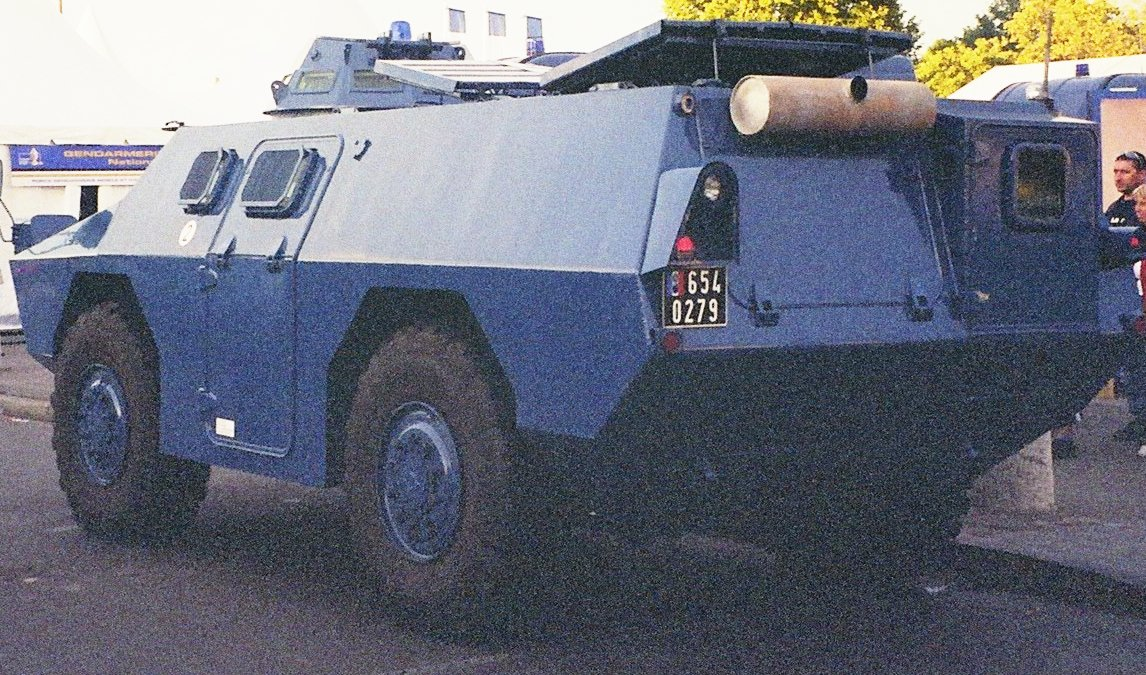
VBRG version

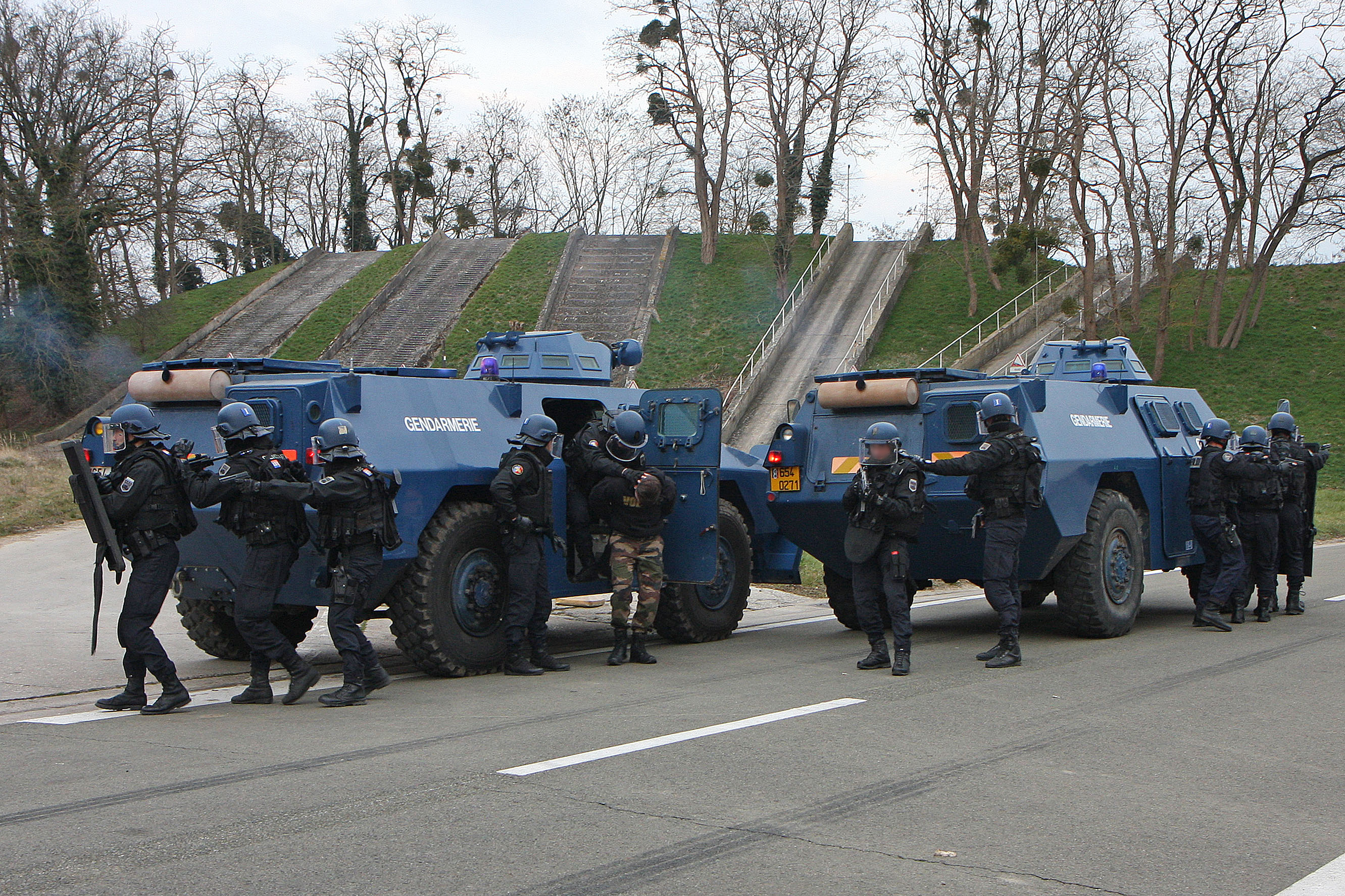
VBRGs during a demo

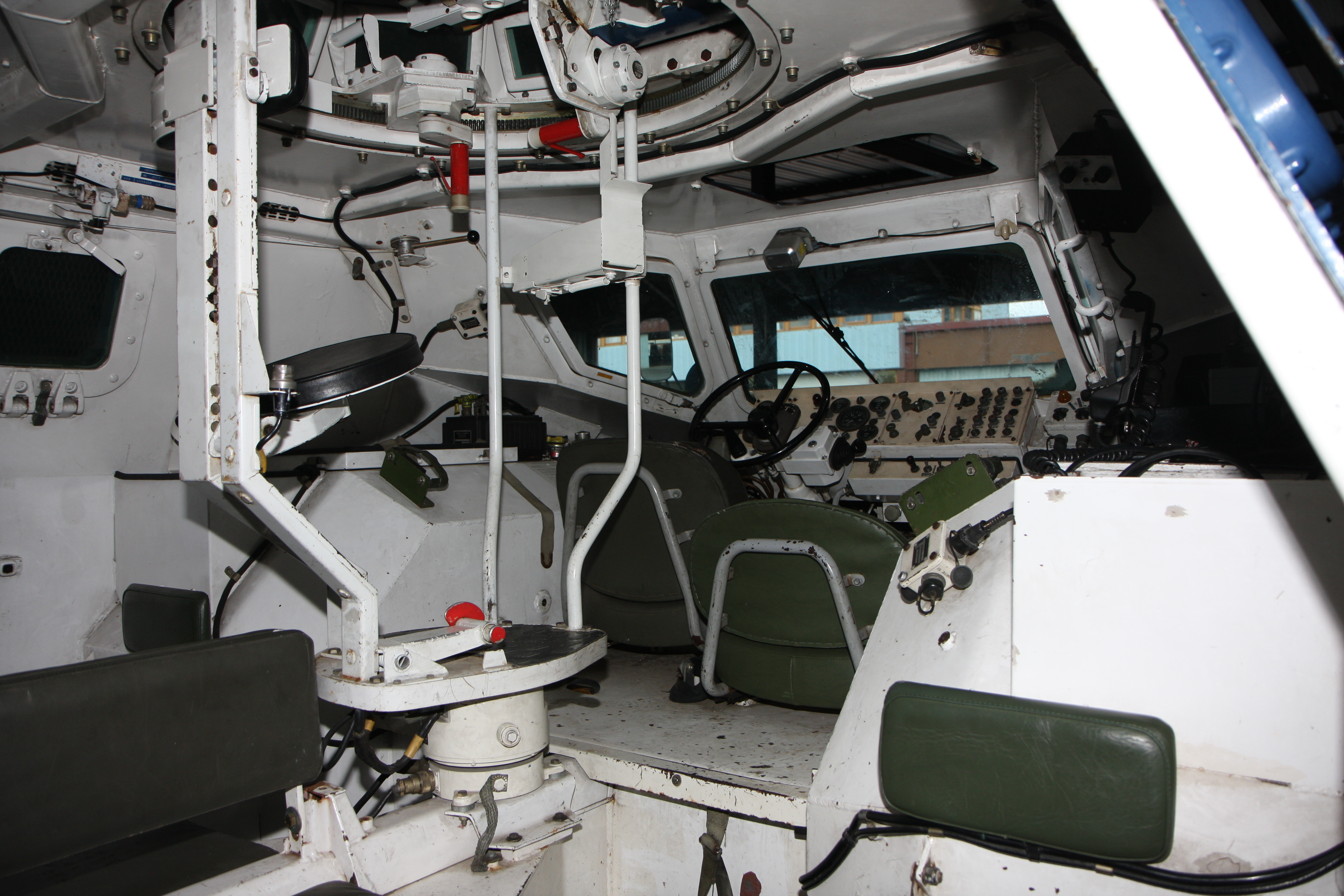
VBRG, internal view

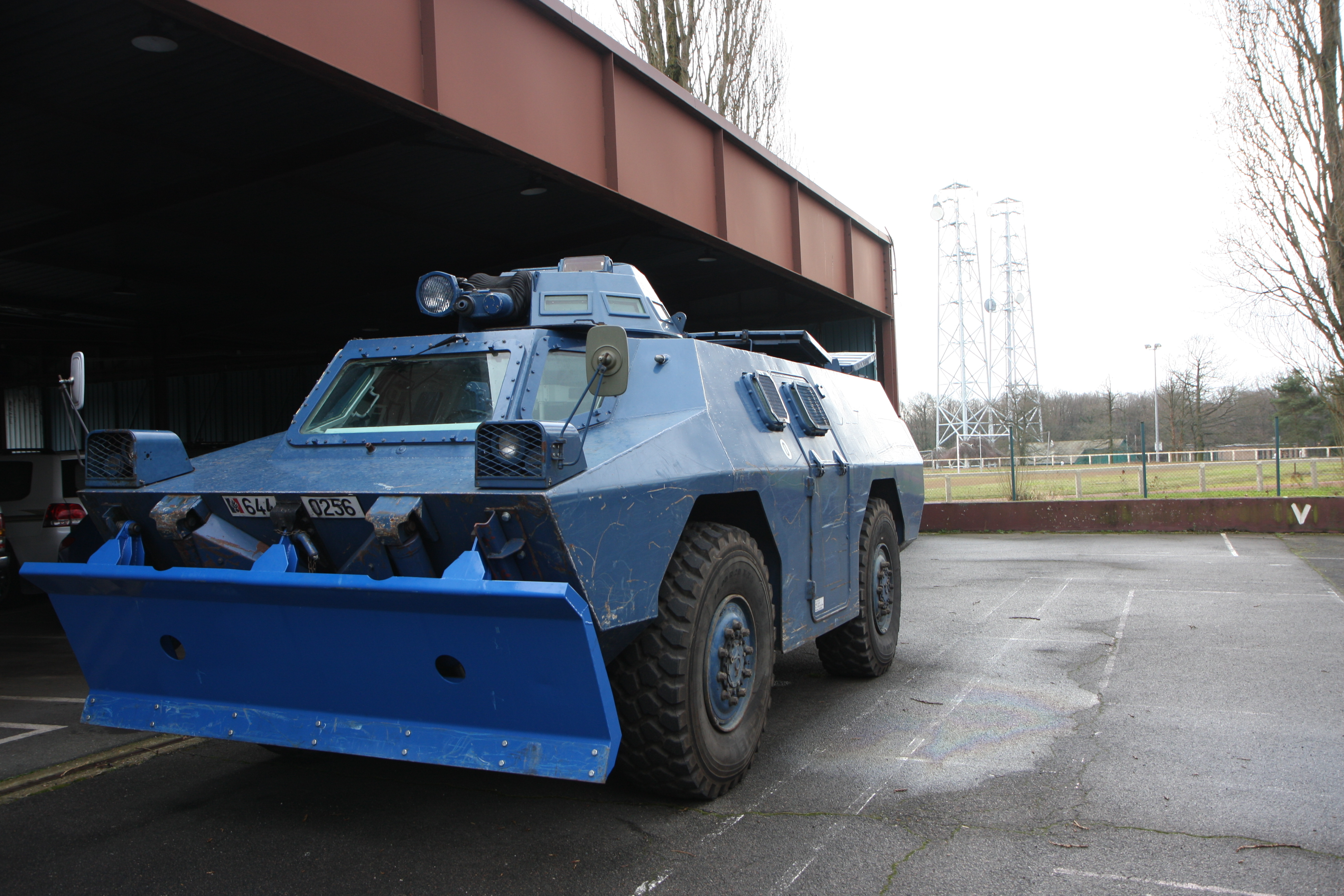
VBRG "Blade" version

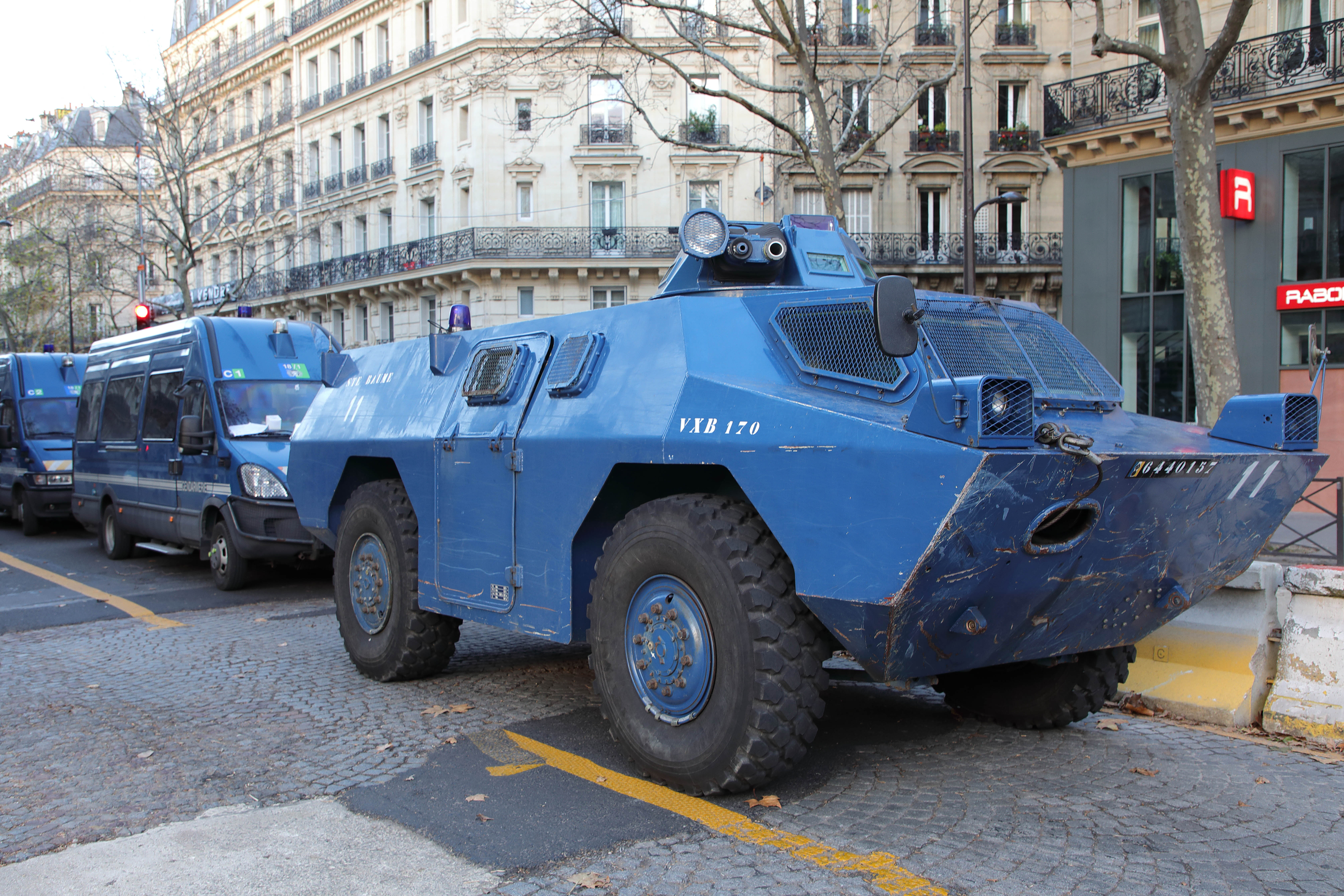
VBRG "Winch" version

== See also ==
- Ratel IFV – (South Africa)
- SIBMAS – (Belgium)
- Véhicule de l'Avant Blindé – (France)
- TM-170 – (West Germany)
