= Coventry Four =

Four South African alleged arms smugglers were arrested by HM Customs & Excise officers in Coventry in March 1984 and charged with conspiring to export arms from Britain to apartheid South Africa in contravention of the mandatory United Nations arms embargo. They became known as the Coventry Four.

== Smuggling activities ==
The four South Africans plus three Britons were charged in the Coventry Magistrates Court on 2 April 1984 with conspiring to export to South Africa high pressure gas cylinders, radar magnetrons, aircraft parts and other military equipment in violation of the mandatory arms embargo imposed by United Nations Security Council Resolution 418. The uncovering of their smuggling operation and subsequent arrest followed the discovery of a shipment of artillery elevating gears at Birmingham Airport in 1984.

The Coventry Four were Hendrik Jacobus Botha, Stephanus Johannes de Jager, William Randolph Metelerkamp and Jacobus la Grange. In the front company (McNay Pty Ltd) they operated on behalf of Kentron, Metelerkamp was the Managing Director, Botha was in charge of administration and security, De Jager was the company accountant, while la Grange was the technical expert.

One of the ways in which they worked around the international arms embargo was for la Grange to travel to the United States to source military materiel - this would subsequently be imported by Fosse Way Securities in the UK, before being shipped onwards to South Africa via other countries.

A fifth man, professor Johannes Cloete of Stellenbosch University – a key player in South Africa's missile development program – was arrested at the same time as the Coventry Four. But, according to The Guardian of 17 December 1988, Cloete's arrest was quickly followed by his release without charge, on instructions from senior Whitehall officials.

The three British men arrested at the same time were Michael Swann, Derek Salt and Michael Henry Gardiner. Salt had previously been dismissed from another company for manufacturing ammunition dies for the South African military, which he concealed as sewing machine equipment. After his dismissal, Salt continued to deal with Armscor, despite the international arms embargo. His company in Coventry manufactured mortar casings to Armscor's specifications, and also sub-contracted the manufacture of the high-precision artillery gears, seized by HM Customs & Excise, to a German company.

The Coventry Four were remanded in custody and their passports confiscated. After several weeks, they were released on bail of £200,000 when André Pelser, 1st Secretary at the South African Embassy in London (South Africa House), waived his diplomatic immunity and stood surety. Then, following an alleged intervention from the prime minister's office, they applied to a Judge sitting in Chambers to recover their passports. In May 1984, Judge Leonard granted the request and allowed the Coventry Four to travel to South Africa, on condition that they undertook to return to Britain for their trial. Salt was given a 10-month jail sentence and fined £25,000 for his part in the operation, while the UK companies involved paid fines of £193,000.

== Controversial visit ==
In June 1984, British prime minister Margaret Thatcher controversially invited South Africa's president P.W. Botha and foreign minister Pik Botha to a meeting at Chequers in an effort to stave off growing international pressure for the imposition of economic sanctions against South Africa, where both the U.S. and Britain had invested heavily. Although not officially on the meeting's agenda, the Coventry Four affair clouded both the proceedings at Chequers and Britain's bilateral diplomatic relations with South Africa.

In August 1989, British diplomat Patrick Haseldine was dismissed for publicly criticising the UK government in the press over the release of the four suspects.

== Quid pro quo ==
In August 1984, when anti-apartheid activists – threatened with arrest in South Africa – took refuge in the British consulate in Durban, Pik Botha decided to retaliate by refusing to allow the Coventry Four to return to Britain to stand trial. Foreign Office minister, Malcolm Rifkind, reported to the House of Commons that the South African government was wholly to blame for the men's non-appearance in a British court, and that Pretoria should cooperate. In the event the men did not come back to stand trial and no action was taken against South Africa. The £200,000 bail money was thus forfeited by the South African Embassy in London.

== See also ==
- Gerald Bull, imprisoned for smuggling artillery technology to South Africa
- South Africa and weapons of mass destruction
- Vela incident
