= Trade Agreement between Southern African Customs Union and European Free Trade Association =

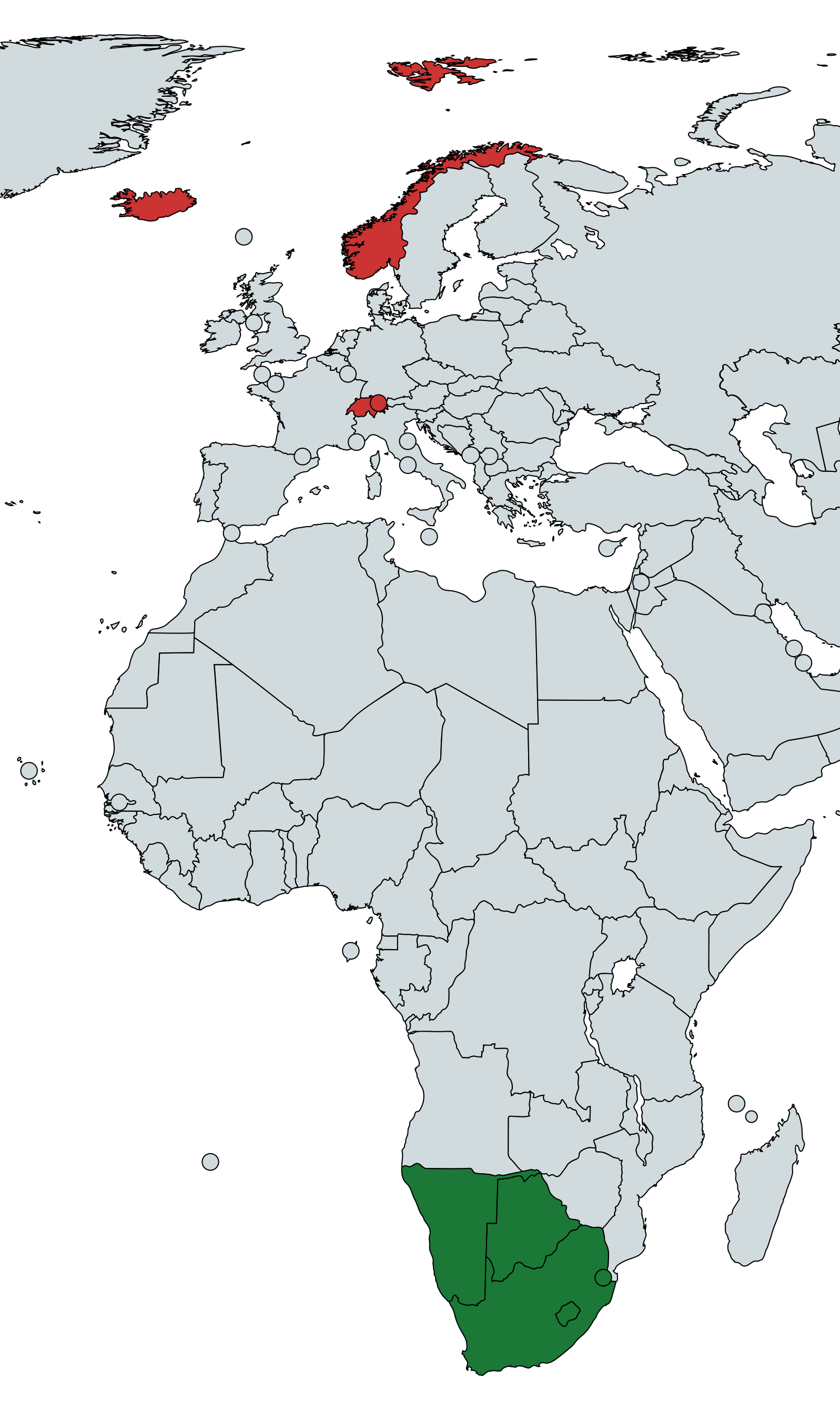
EFTA and SACU areas on the World Map: Date of entering into force / 1 May 2008; Date of signing / 26 June 2006; Location / Höfn, Iceland

The Trade Agreement between Southern African Customs Union (SACU) and European Free Trade Association (EFTA) is a Free trade agreement signed by both parties in 2006 in Höfn, Iceland and entered into force on 1 May 2008. It involves 9 countries: 4 are members of EFTA (Iceland, Liechtenstein, Norway, and Switzerland) and 5 are members of SACU (Botswana, Lesotho, Namibia, South Africa, and Eswatini). The goal of the agreement is to deepen the relations between parties, provide favorable conditions for trade, and encourage economic integration and social development in SACU member states with support from EFTA.

== History ==
The first step toward the agreement was made in 1999 by EFTA when The Secretary-general of EFTA started a conversation with South African Minister, Alex Erwin, about the possibility of a free trade agreement with the Republic of South Africa. In 2000 EFTA sent a delegation to start a formal negotiation. South Africa insisted that all other members of SACU must be included in the agreement, which slowed down the process for several years. For EFTA, entering into free trade agreements with another trade bloc has become a precedent. It also was the first time that its free trade partner became one of the least developed countries (Lesotho). Negotiations were conducted from 2003 to 2006 until the agreement was signed by all members on 26 June 2006 in Hofn, Iceland.

A prerequisite for a trade agreement was well-established trade relations between South Africa, Switzerland and Norway. It made it relatively easy for the sides to initiate and successfully conclude FTA negotiations.

== Goals and Conditions ==
The objectives of this Agreement are to

- Achieve trade liberalization between the two sides.
- Provide a better opportunity for foreign direct investments to the countries of the free trade area.
- Ensure and guarantee the protection of Intellectual property rights.
- Create the necessary conditions and infrastructure for the further development of trade between the parties.
- Remove trade barriers in order to promote world trade, contribute to the development of international trade.

The EFTA States should assist SACU technically in order to help them with the implementation of the Agreement. As EFTA countries are more developed, they are committed to providing technical assistance to the SACU States in the implementation of this trade agreement. The assistance provided will focus on exchange of information, transfer of expertise, and training with regard to trade policy, trade facilitation and trade promotion; customs and origin matters; technical regulations, standards and conformity assessment as well as sanitary and phytosanitary measures; local enterprise development; and regulatory assistance and implementation of laws in areas such as services, investment, intellectual property and public procurement.. Also, the parties undertake to coordinate their actions with the WTO and other trade organisations

In case one side of the agreement enters into a new agreement with other countries or trade blocs in any of the areas of trade, investments, and government procurement, it has to, if there is a demand from its trade partner, to arrange conditions that would be beneficial and desirable by both parties.

Moreover, the agreement includes the standard inclusion of an FTA that the countries involved would be able to protect themselves from imports that may damage the fragile domestic industry.

== Trade ==
The trade between blocs has grown by approximately 9.3% from 2008 to 2018, since the agreement was signed. The net trade balance of EFTA was negative until 2012, but in 2013 the total import has dropped significantly and export exceeded it

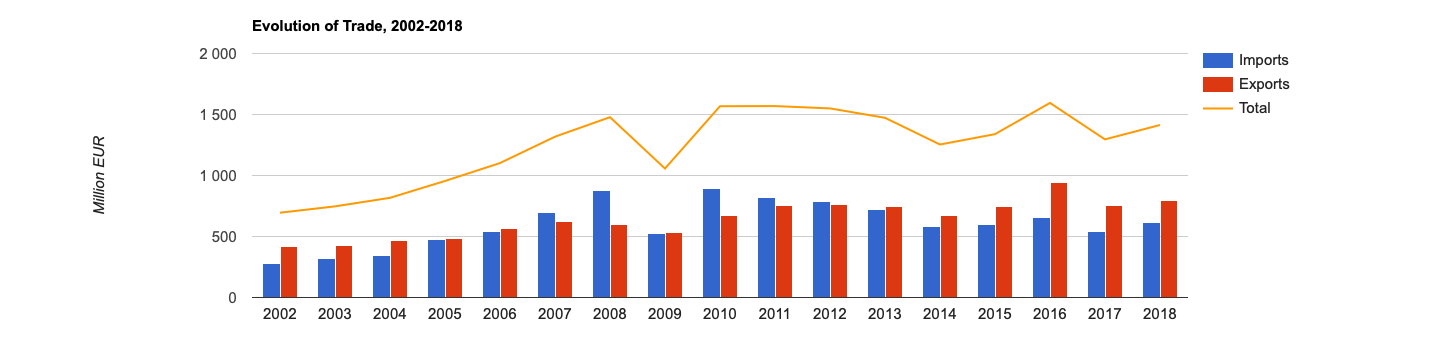
EFTA Trade Balance with SACU, 2002-2018

In 2018 the EFTA net export and net import equal €798 million (net export) and €616 million (net import). The total import and export of EFTA with SACU represent just 0,3% of the total world import and export of EFTA . For SACU, it comprised 1% of the South African export market. According to the Director of Trade Negotiations between these two blocs, even this number is significant for improving the trading conditions, especially in the textile and clothing industry.

The main products exported to SACU from the EFTA states are Pharmaceutical products, tobacco, machinery, mechanical appliances, optical/medical/surgical instruments, and mineral fuels/oil.

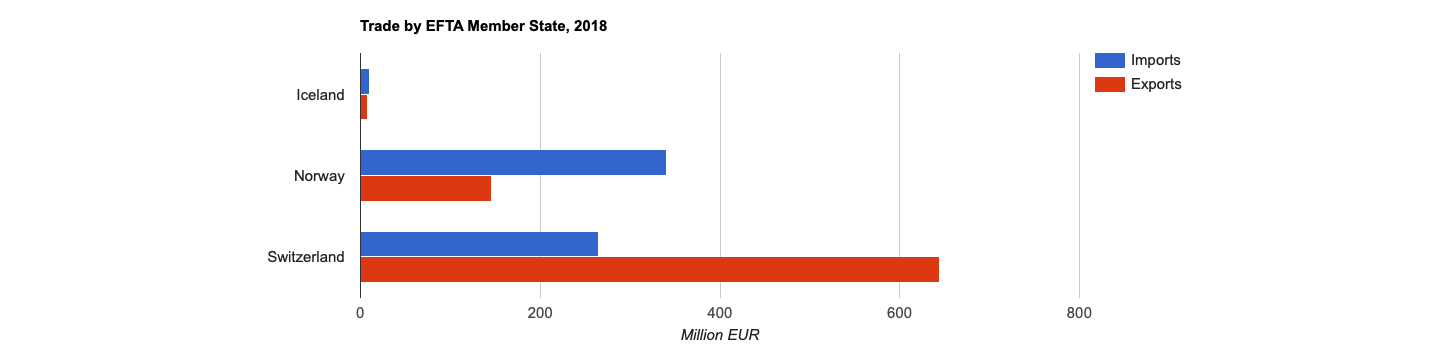
Trade with SACU by EFTA Member State, 2018

SACU exports to EFTA vehicles (not railway), ores/slag/ash, fruit and nuts, aluminium, and meat.

The main exporter of the EFTA States is Switzerland, it is responsible for 80% of all export. The major importer is Norway; it is responsible for 55% of the total import from SACU. Iceland is not a significant trade partner, it has about 1% of the trade between two blocs.

== Special Conditions ==
According to the agreement, EFTA States had to drop all tariffs to the SACU States immediately after the agreement enters into force, when the SACU States had time till 2014 to slowly dismantling its tariffs. Additionally, EFTA guarantees to act according to the Principles of economic cooperation and support. Due to the asymmetry in the economic development of the sides, EFTA provides several concessions to Botswana, Lesotho, Namibia, and Eswatini in order to encourage the development of these countries.

SACU also has signed 3 bilateral agricultural agreements., one with Norway, one with Iceland, and one with Switzerland (all except Liechtenstein). The reason is that EFTA has no common policy regarding agriculture, as well as no common tariffs. It means each of the mentioned countries follows different strategies toward trade and therefore cannot offer a common deal on agriculture. However, it excludes fish and processed agricultural products which are covered separately in a different section of the agreement
