= United Nations Security Council Resolution 282 =

UN Security Council Resolution 282
- Date: July 23 1970
- Meeting no.: 1,549
- Code: S/RES/282 (Document)
- Subject: The Question of race conflict in South Africa resulting from the policies of apartheid of the Government of the Republic of South Africa
- Voting summary: 11 voted for; None voted against; 4 abstained
- Result: Adopted

Security Council composition
- Permanent members: China; France; Soviet Union; United Kingdom; United States
- Non-permanent members: Burundi; Colombia; Finland; Nepal; Poland; Spain; Syria; Zambia

United Nations Security Council Resolution 282, adopted on July 23, 1970, concerned by violations of the arms embargo passed against South Africa in Resolution 181, the Council reiterated its total opposition to the policies of apartheid and reaffirmed its previous resolutions on the topic. The Council called upon states to strengthen the arms embargo by ceasing the provision of military training to members of the South African armed forces and by taking appropriate action to give effective to the resolution's measures.

The resolution was adopted with 12 votes; France, Spain, the United Kingdom, and the United States abstained from voting.

== See also ==
- List of United Nations Security Council Resolutions 201 to 300 (1965–1971)
- South Africa under apartheid
- United Nations Security Council Resolution 418
