= United Nations Security Council Resolution 421 =

UN Security Council Resolution 421
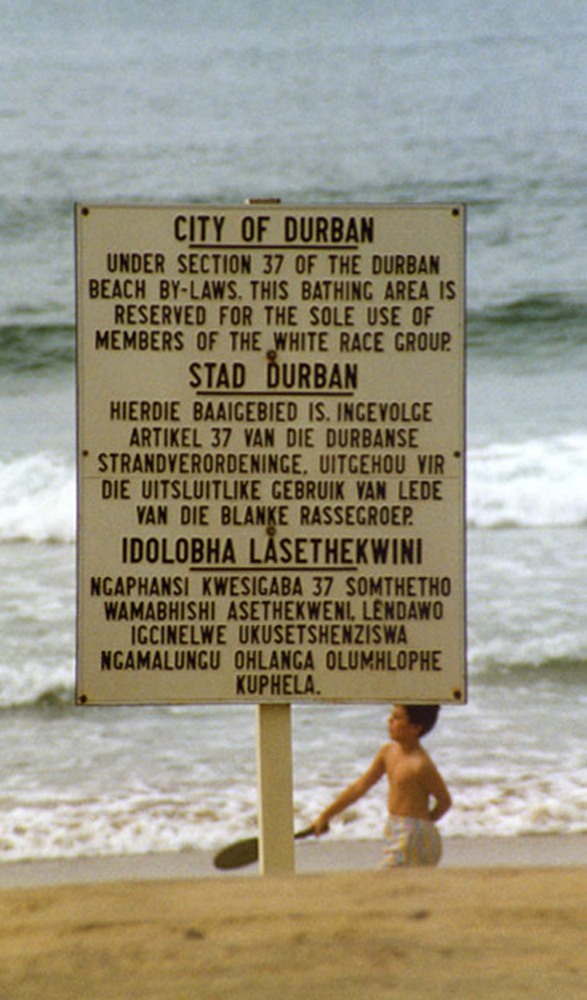
- Apartheid-era sign on a South African beach
- Date: 9 December 1977
- Meeting no.: 2,052
- Code: S/RES/421 (Document)
- Subject: South Africa
- Voting summary: 14 voted for; 1 voted against; None abstained
- Result: Adopted

Security Council composition
- Permanent members: China; France; Soviet Union; United Kingdom; United States
- Non-permanent members: Benin; Canada; India; Libya; Mauritius; Pakistan; Panama; Romania; Venezuela; West Germany

United Nations Security Council Resolution 421, adopted unanimously on December 9, 1977, after recalling Resolution 418, the Council decided to establish a committee to oversee the implementation of that resolution. It tasked the committee to report back on its observations and recommendations regarding ways in which the arms embargo could be made more effective against South Africa and to ask Member States as to how they are implementing the resolution.

Resolution 421 went on to call on all Member States to cooperate fully with the committee in the above respects, and to the Secretary-General to make appropriate arrangements to allow the committee to function. All parties voted for except for France who voted against.

== See also ==
- List of United Nations Security Council Resolutions 401 to 500 (1976–1982)
- South Africa under apartheid
