= United Nations Security Council Resolution 418 =

UN Security Council Resolution 418
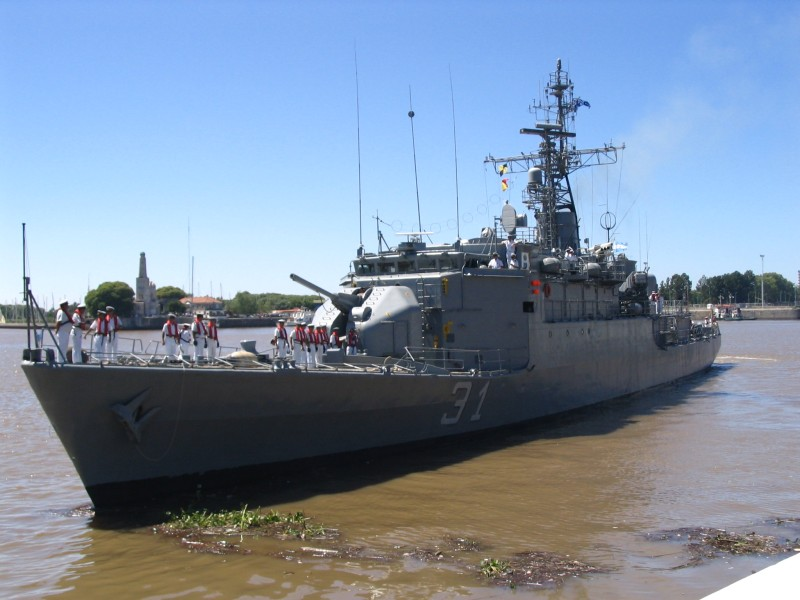
- (formerly SAS Good Hope), a D'Estienne d'Orves-class corvette whose sale to South Africa was blocked by UNSCR 418
- Date: 4 November 1977
- Meeting no.: 2,046
- Code: S/RES/418 (Document)
- Subject: South Africa
- Voting summary: 15 voted for; None voted against; None abstained
- Result: Adopted

Security Council composition
- Permanent members: China; France; Soviet Union; United Kingdom; United States
- Non-permanent members: Benin; Canada; India; Libya; Mauritius; Pakistan; Panama; Romania; Venezuela; West Germany

United Nations Security Council Resolution 418, adopted unanimously on 4 November 1977, imposed a mandatory arms embargo against South Africa. This resolution differed from the earlier Resolution 282, which was only voluntary. The embargo was subsequently tightened and extended by Resolution 591.

The embargo was lifted by Resolution 919 following democratic elections in South Africa in 1994.

== Impact ==
The embargo had a direct impact on South Africa in a number of ways:

- Last-minute cancellation of the sale of D'Estienne d'Orves-class avisos and Agosta-class submarines by France.
- The cancelation of the purchase of Sa'ar 4-class missile boats from Israel, some of which had to be built covertly in South Africa instead.
- South Africa's inability to purchase modern fighter aircraft to counter Cuban MiG-23s over the SAAF in the South African Border War.
- The growth of the modern day multibillion-dollar South African arms industry.
- The end of shipments by the United States of enriched uranium fuel for South Africa's SAFARI-1 research nuclear reactor.

== Circumvention of the embargo ==
The South African government devised a number of strategies to bypass the embargo to obtain military technology and components that it was unable to procure openly. United Nations Security Council Resolution 591 was passed in 1986 to extend the embargo and to tighten some of the loopholes.

=== Local production ===
Many armaments were wholly designed and manufactured in South Africa, as reflected by the growth and export business of Armscor. South African defence industries were able to successfully meet demand in some areas such as ammunition, infantry weapons, missile technology and armoured vehicles but struggled when it came to the development of combat aircraft, attack helicopters and main battle tanks. For more advanced systems, Armscor would often modernise and improve on designs imported or licence-built in the years prior to the embargo, sometimes to the point of being an almost completely different design (such as the Atlas Oryx helicopter or Olifant main battle tank). By the 1980s, almost all of South Africa's weapons were domestically developed.

=== Smuggling ===
Notable operations that came to light were:

- The 1984 case of the Coventry Four. Four South African businessmen in the UK were found to be operating a front company on the behalf of Kentron that was sourcing materiel in defiance of the ban.
- The arrest and imprisonment of Gerald Bull for developing the G5 howitzer for Armscor.
- The nuclear weapons program reached its peak during the embargo. According to David Albright, components for the program were imported without the knowledge of the international community, or put to ingenious uses that had not been envisaged by the enforcers of the embargo.

=== Dual purpose equipment ===
Computer and air traffic control radar systems ostensibly destined for civilian use were diverted to the military.

=== Use of foreign specialists ===
The South African government was able to hire the services of foreign technicians, for example Israeli specialists who had worked on the Lavi fighter aircraft were recruited by Atlas Aircraft Corporation to work on the Atlas Cheetah and Atlas Carver.

=== Licensed production ===
In some cases, foreign armaments were simply produced under license in South Africa, as in the case of the Warrior-class strike craft, the R4 assault rifle and Atlantis Diesel Engines.

=== Co-operation with other states ===
South Africa exchanged military technology with other states in a similar position to itself, notably through the Israel–South Africa Agreement, as well as with Taiwan and Morocco. Between 1977 and 1991, Morocco was involved in transfer of French technology, French armaments and designs to South Africa, and in return South African Forces and specialists went to train the Moroccan Armed Forces and Police

== See also ==
- Armscor (South Africa)
- Denel
- History of South Africa in the Apartheid era
- List of United Nations Security Council Resolutions 401 to 500 (1976–1982)
- United Nations Security Council Resolution 181
