= United States MRAP program =

Program to produce mine-resistant ambush protected vehicle

The United States MRAP program was created to produce mine-resistant ambush protected vehicles for the country. In 2004, the TSG/FPI Cougar was designed by a British-led U.S. team, to U.S. Marine Corps requirements. It became the springboard from which the MRAP program was launched. Only two "armor quality" steel mills operate in the U.S.: the Russian-owned Oregon Steel Mills and the International Steel Group (now part of ArcelorMittal). The U.S. Department of Defense negotiated to ensure enough steel was available to keep pace with production. The U.S. military's MRAP program was prompted by U.S. casualties from improvised explosive devices (IED)s during the Iraq War. The United States Department of Defense MRAP program began in 2007 as a response to the increased threat of IEDs during the Iraq War. From 2007 until 2012, the MRAP program deployed more than 12,000 vehicles in the Iraq War and War in Afghanistan.

Production of the first round of MRAP vehicles officially ended in 2012, followed by the launch of the Oshkosh M-ATV vehicle. In 2015, Oshkosh Corporation was awarded a contract to build the Oshkosh L-ATV as the Joint Light Tactical Vehicle, a lighter mine-resistant vehicle to replace the Humvee in combat roles and supplement the M-ATV.

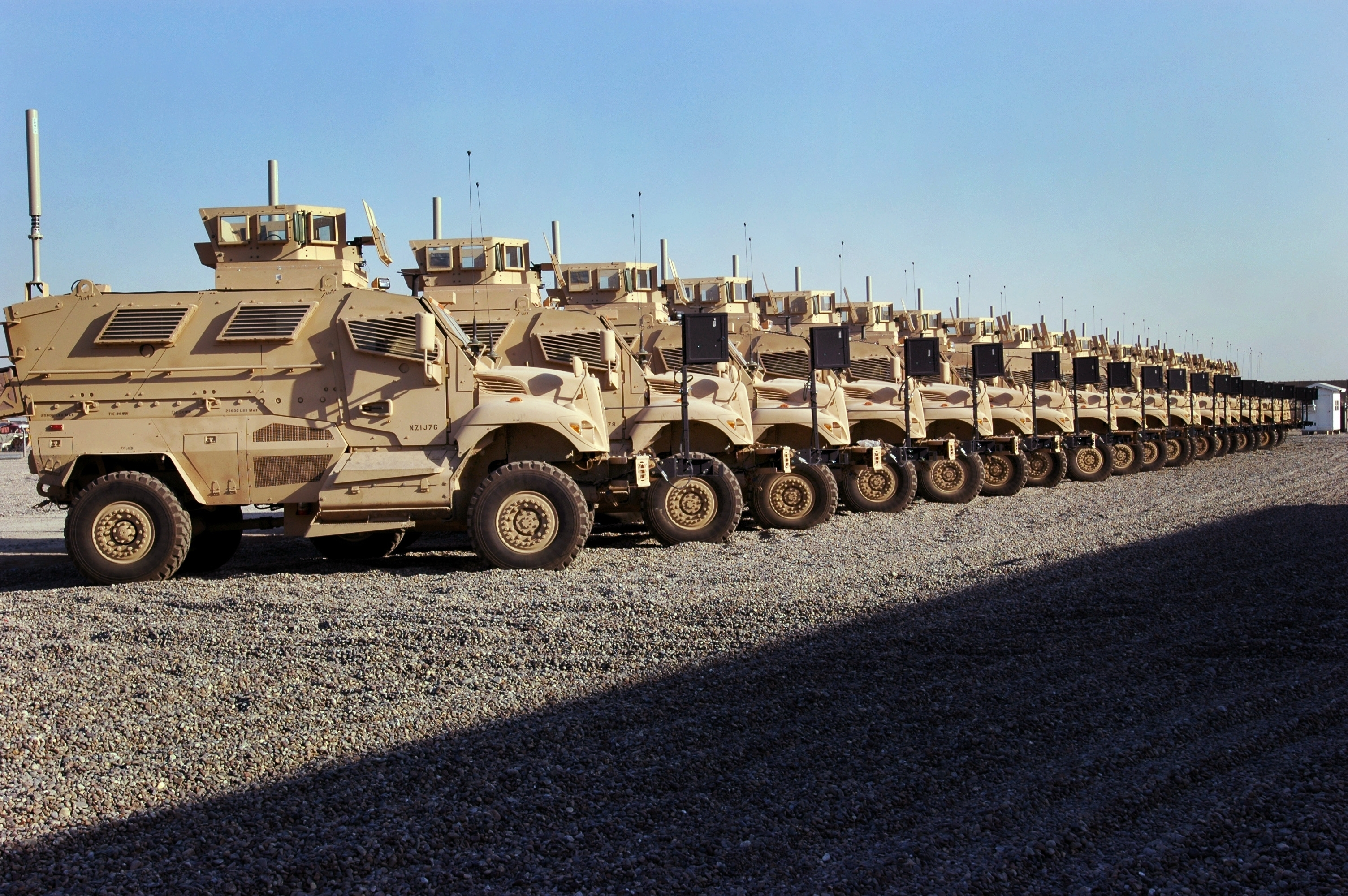
First MaxxPros fielded in Iraq

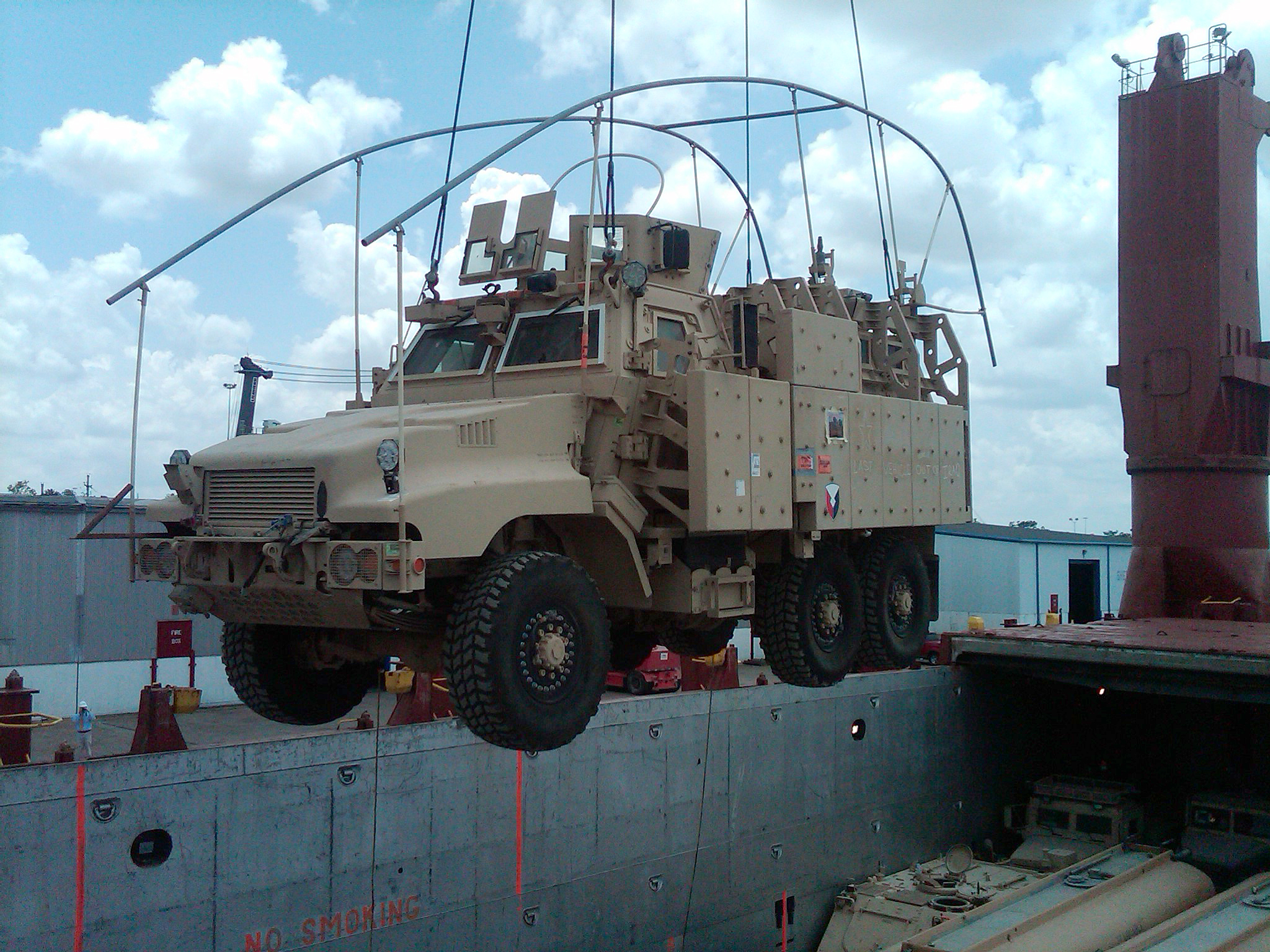
The last vehicle from Iraq returned to U.S. This vehicle arrived at the Port of Beaumont, Texas, on 6 May 2012, and was unloaded from the ship on 7 May 2012.

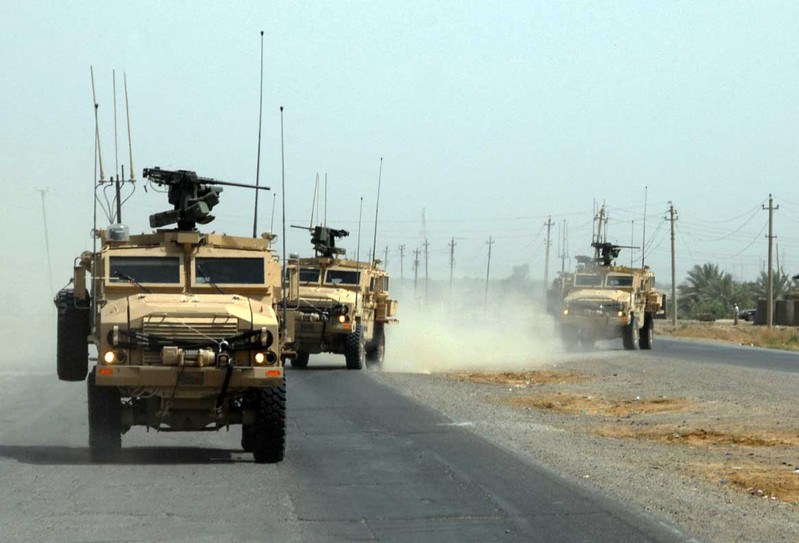
A RG-33 convoy with the Common Remotely Operated Weapon Station (CROWS) system installed.

Vehicle designs from various vendors were deployed as part of the MRAP program. MRAPs usually have V-shaped hulls to deflect explosive forces from land mines or IEDs below the vehicle, thereby protecting vehicle and passengers. MRAPs weigh 14 to 18 tons, are up to 9 feet (2.7 m) high, and cost between US$500,000 and US$1,000,000. The MRAP's high center of gravity means it has a tendency to roll over easily. In one study, a majority of MRAP accidents are overturned vehicles.

These companies submitting designs:

- Armor Holdings (acquired by BAE Systems on 31 July 2007)
- BAE Systems
- Force Protection Inc (FPI)
- General Dynamics Land Systems (GDLS)
- General Purpose Vehicles (GPV)
- Navistar International Military Group (IMG)
- Oshkosh Truck
- Protected Vehicles Incorporated (PVI)
- Textron Marine & Land Systems

== American MRAP categories ==
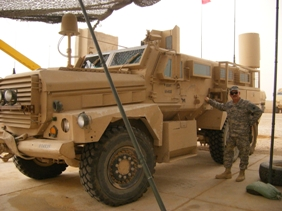
American serviceman alongside his Cougar MRAP, Ramadi, Iraq, in 2008

The MRAP class is separated into three categories according to weight and size.

=== Category I (MRAP-MRUV) ===
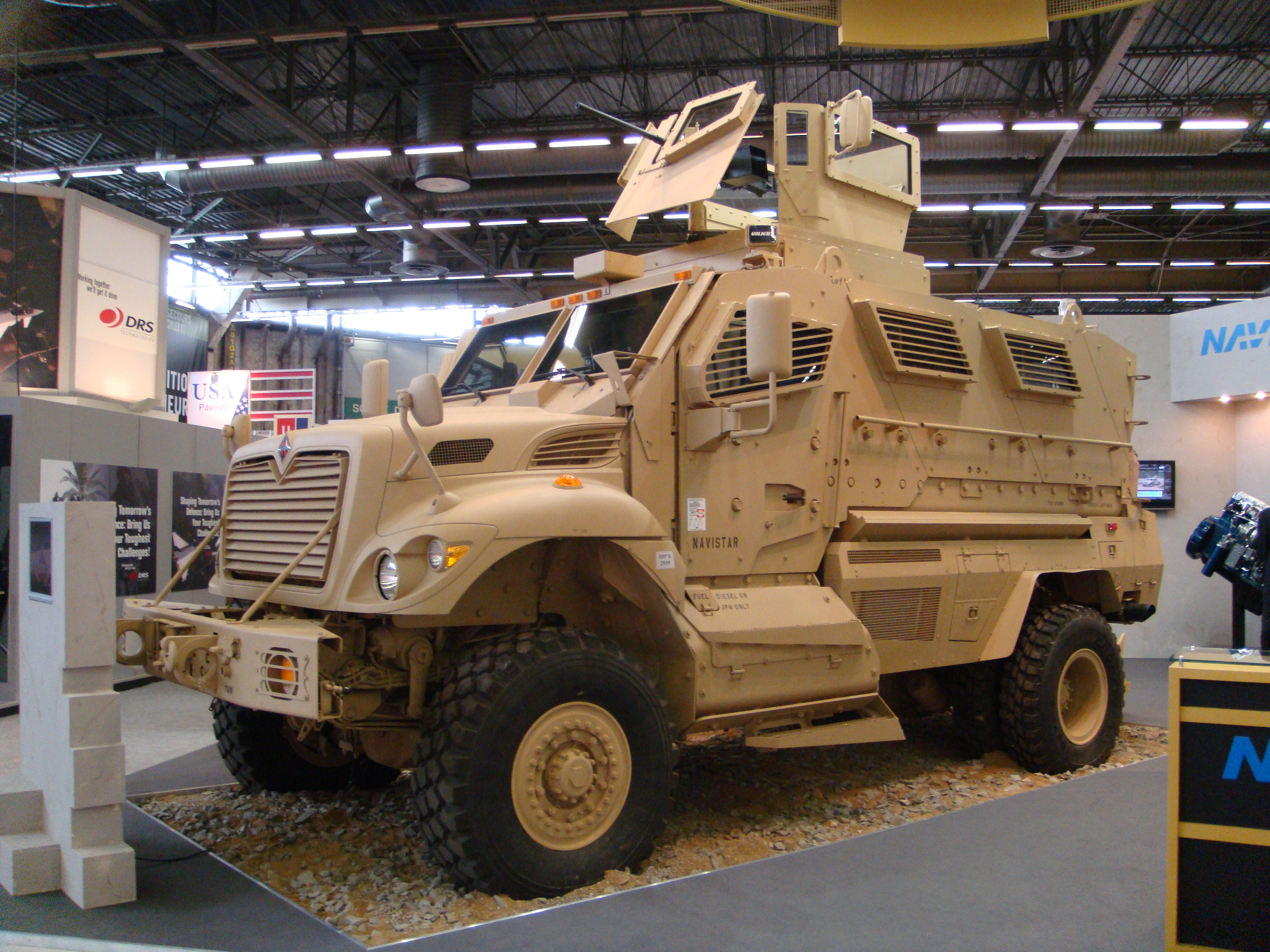
International MaxxPro Category 1 MRAP

The Mine-Resistant Utility Vehicle (MRUV) is relatively small and light, designed for urban operations. These Category 1 MRAP vehicles were ordered or are in service:

- BAE Caiman 4x4 – 2,864 ordered.
- BAE OMC RG-31
- BAE RG-33 4x4
- Force Protection Cougar H 4x4 – 1,560 vehicles ordered.
- International MaxxPro – 7,474 vehicles ordered.
- Textron M1117 Guardian – Removed from competition as of 18 May 2007.
- Protected Vehicles Inc./Oshkosh Truck Alpha – Removed from competition as of 29 June 2007.

=== Category II (MRAP-JERRV) ===
The Joint Explosive Ordnance Disposal (EOD) Rapid Response Vehicle (JERRV) is designed for missions including convoy lead, troop transport, ambulance, explosive ordnance disposal and combat engineering.

These Category II MRAP vehicles were ordered or are currently in service:

- Force Protection Cougar HE 6x6 – 950 vehicles ordered.
- BAE RG-33L 6x6
- GDLS RG-31E – 600 vehicles ordered.
- Thales Australia Bushmaster IMV – Removed from competition as of 7 August 2007.
- Protected Vehicles Inc Golan – 60 vehicles ordered. Later the Golan was eliminated from the competition and all vehicles were discarded.
- International MaxxPro XL – 16 vehicles ordered.
- BAE Caiman 6x6 – 16 vehicles ordered.

=== Category III ===
- Force Protection Buffalo MRV for mine- and IED-clearing functionality, with 6 seats.

== American MRAP Models ==
=== MRAP II ===
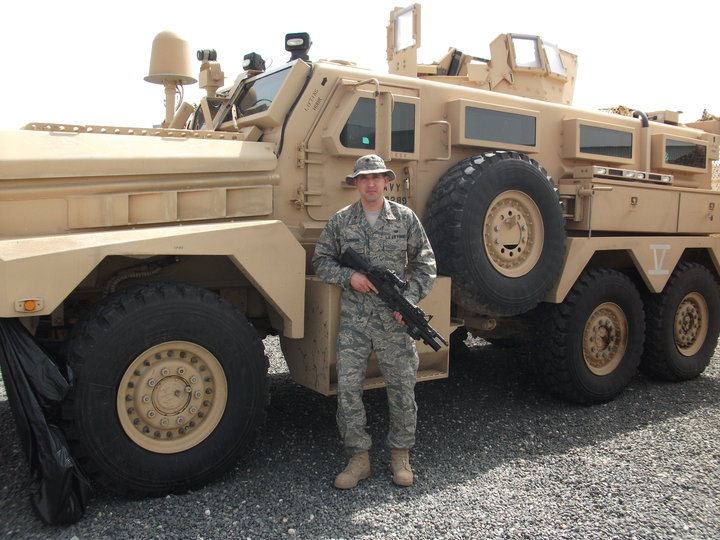
A member of the United States Air Force stands in front of an MRAP in Southwest Asia.

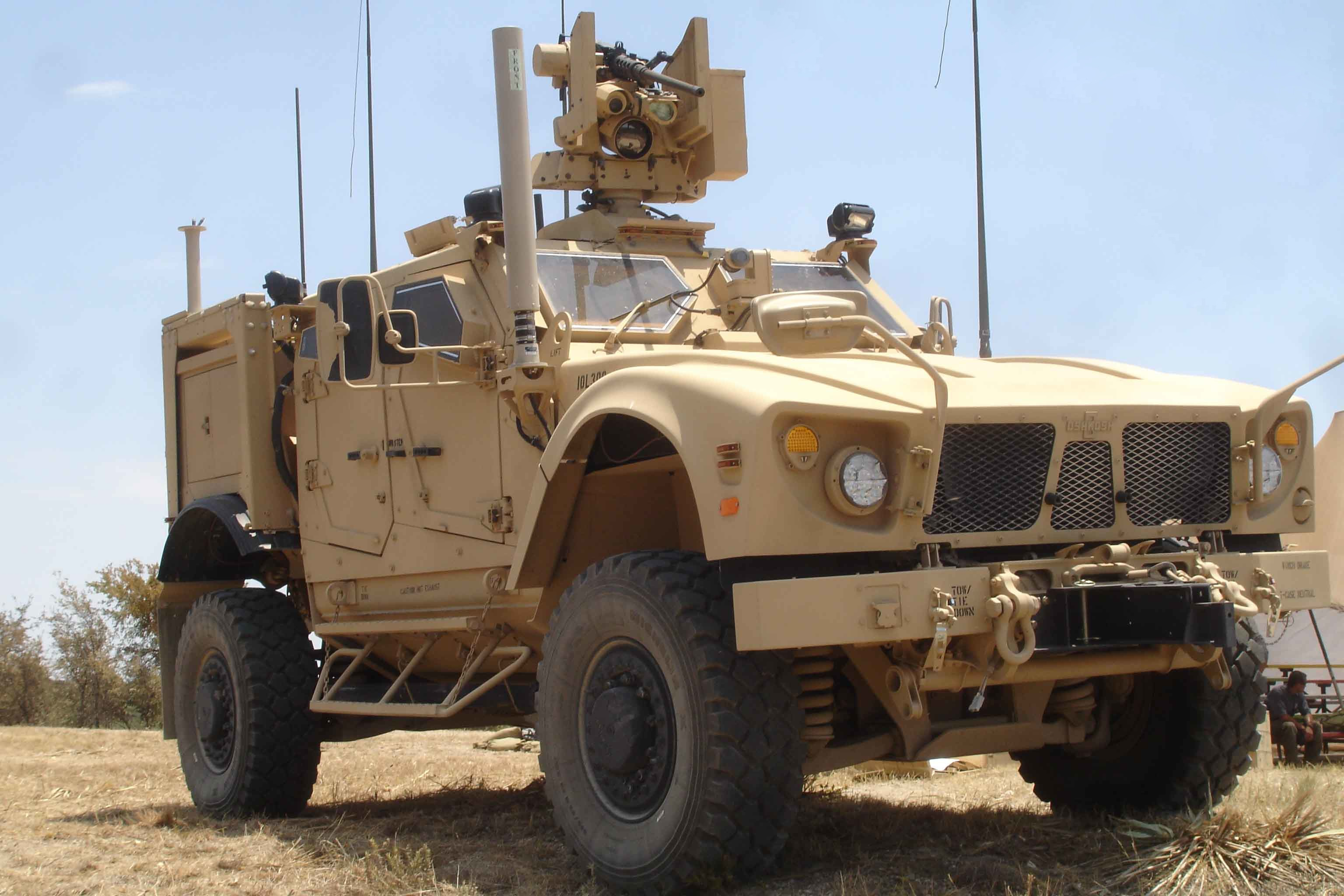
M153 Common Remotely Operated Weapon Station (CROWS) mounted on a U.S. Army M-ATV

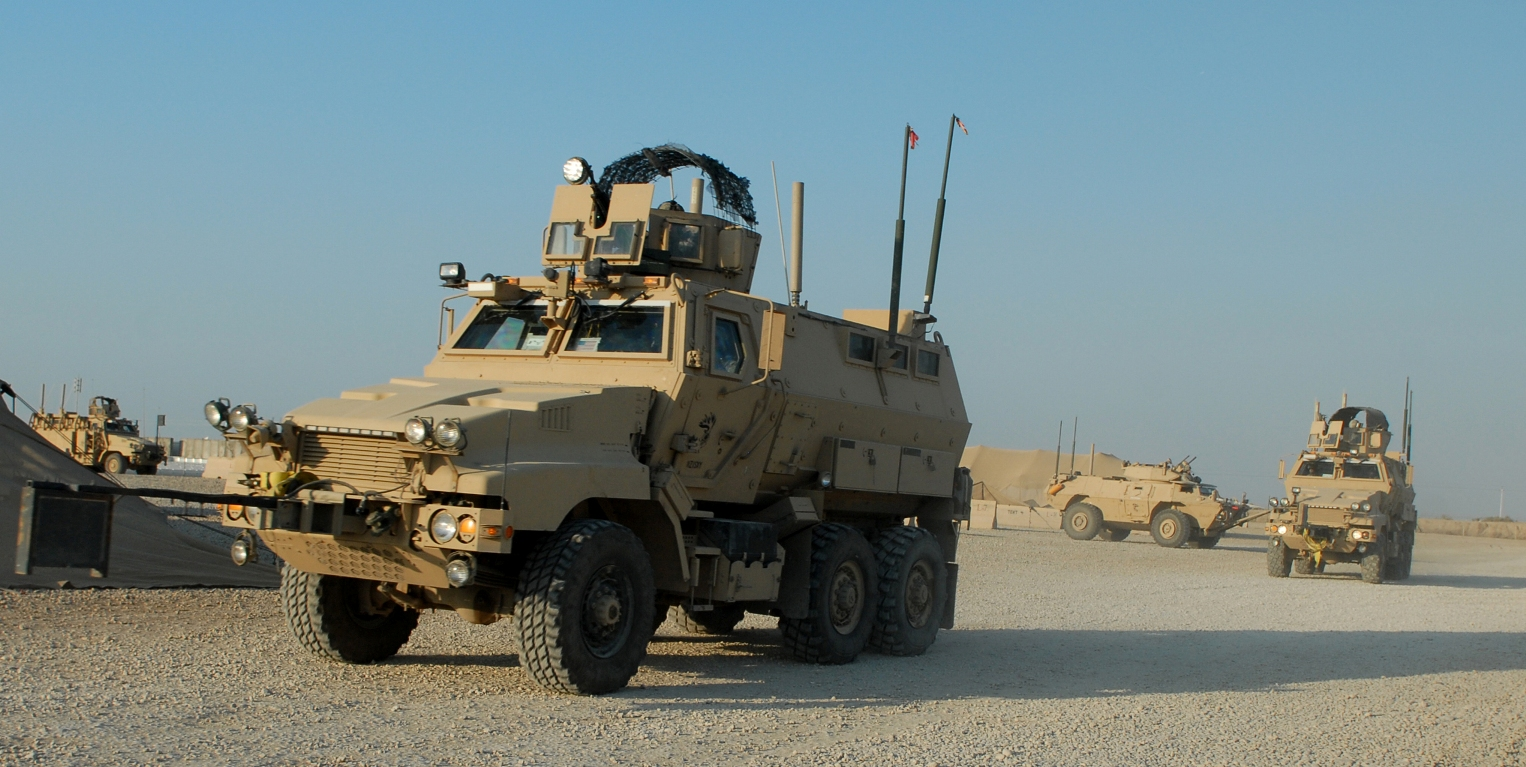
Caiman MRAPs and a Textron M1117 in Iraq

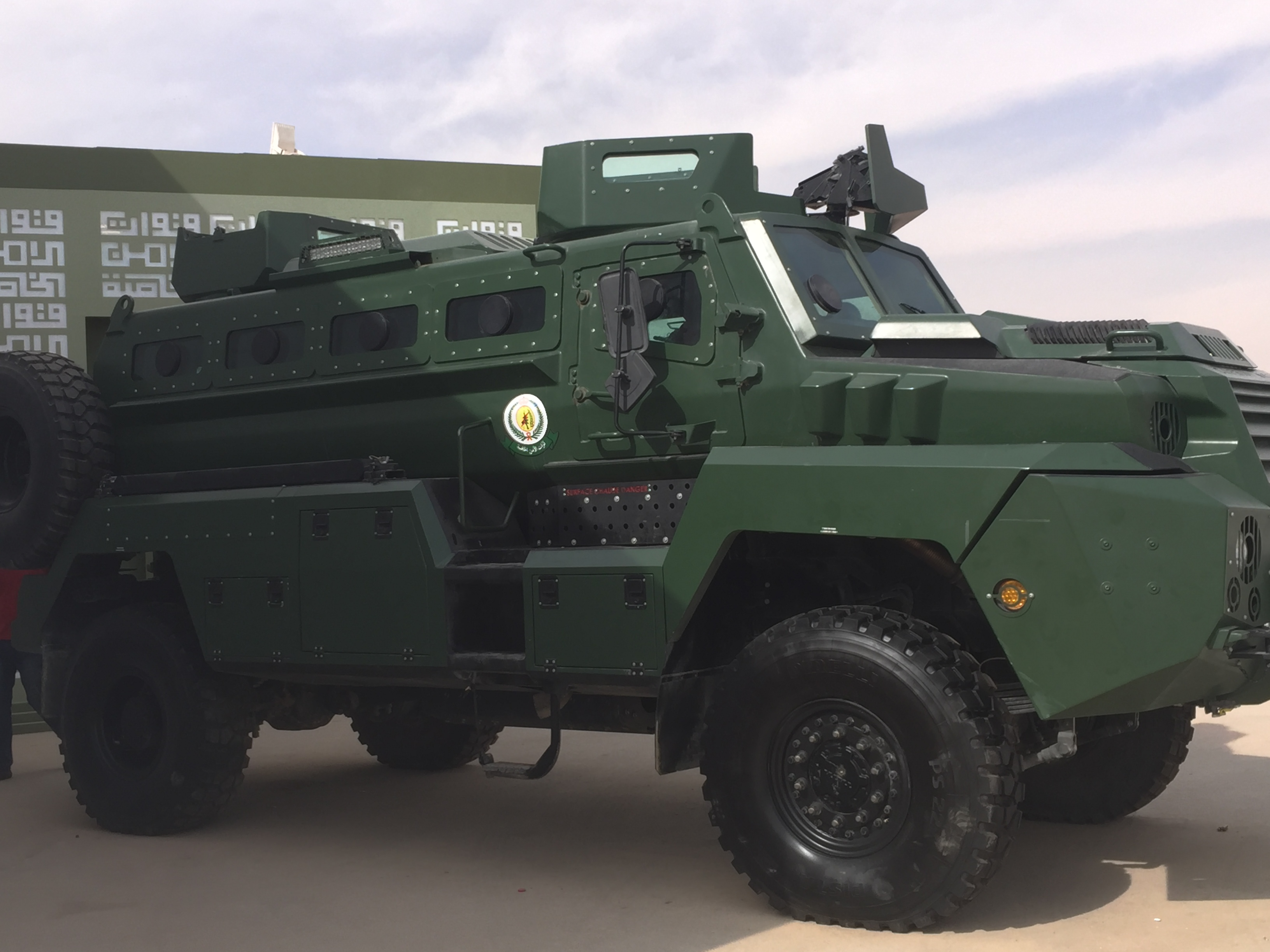
Mobile Land Systems Caprivi Mk3 MRAP

On 31 July 2007, the Marine Corps Systems Command launched an MRAP II pre-solicitation to develop a new vehicle with better protection, particularly against such threats as explosively formed penetrators. While the Frag Kit 6 was designed to handle EFPs, the MRAP II competition's purpose was to find a vehicle that did not need the upgrade kit. The U.S. Army Research Laboratory worked to ensure the technologies used in Frag Kit 6 would be available to MRAP II designers. The 2007 solicitation asked for greater flexibility.

Initial testing at Aberdeen Proving Grounds disqualified Force Dynamics (reinforced Cougar), GDLS Canada (upgraded BAE OMC RG-31), Navistar subsidiary IMG (upgraded MaxxPro), Textron's upgraded M1117, and Protected Vehicles, Inc's upgraded Golan vehicle. Blackwater USA (Grizzly APC with Ares EXO Scale appliqué armor) was later disqualified due to limited forward armor.

The two qualified designs were an upgraded Caiman designed by Armor Holdings (later acquired by BAE Systems), and the Bull, a combined effort between Ideal Innovations Inc, Ceradyne and Oshkosh. Both designs weighed 40,000 lb or more.

According to the Army Times, the Pentagon had already decided to buy first-generation 14- to 24-ton MRAP I vehicles with extra Frag Kit 6-derived armor, not the 30-ton MRAP II vehicles. The paper also reported that, in addition, the Pentagon might buy some shorter, lighter MRAPs. A senior Pentagon official told them that "the roads are caving in" under the weight of MRAPs and "We want it to weigh less".

=== Survivable Combat Tactical Vehicle ===
In 2010 Textron presented the Survivable Combat Tactical Vehicle (SCTV), a protective capsule that can increase Humvee survivability to MRAP levels while significantly improving mobility. SCTV consisted of five kits; all five need to be installed before the vehicle can be properly called an SCTV. The vehicle features a monocoque V-shaped hull and angled sides to help deflect rocket-propelled grenades (RPGs) with scalable levels of protection. It has greater engine power, replacing the 6.5 liter diesel engine with a Cummins 6.7 liter diesel and Allison 6-speed transmission, as well as stronger suspension, improved brakes, higher ground clearance, and many other modifications.

=== Joint Light Tactical Vehicle ===
Vehicles built as part of the MRAP program are often criticized for their bulk. The Joint Light Tactical Vehicle is designed to provide the same protection as an MRAP vehicle with lower weight and greater maneuverability.

In 2015, Oshkosh was awarded a contract to produce up to 49,100 vehicles for the US Army and Marine Corps based on its successful MRAP ATV.

== Vehicle production ==
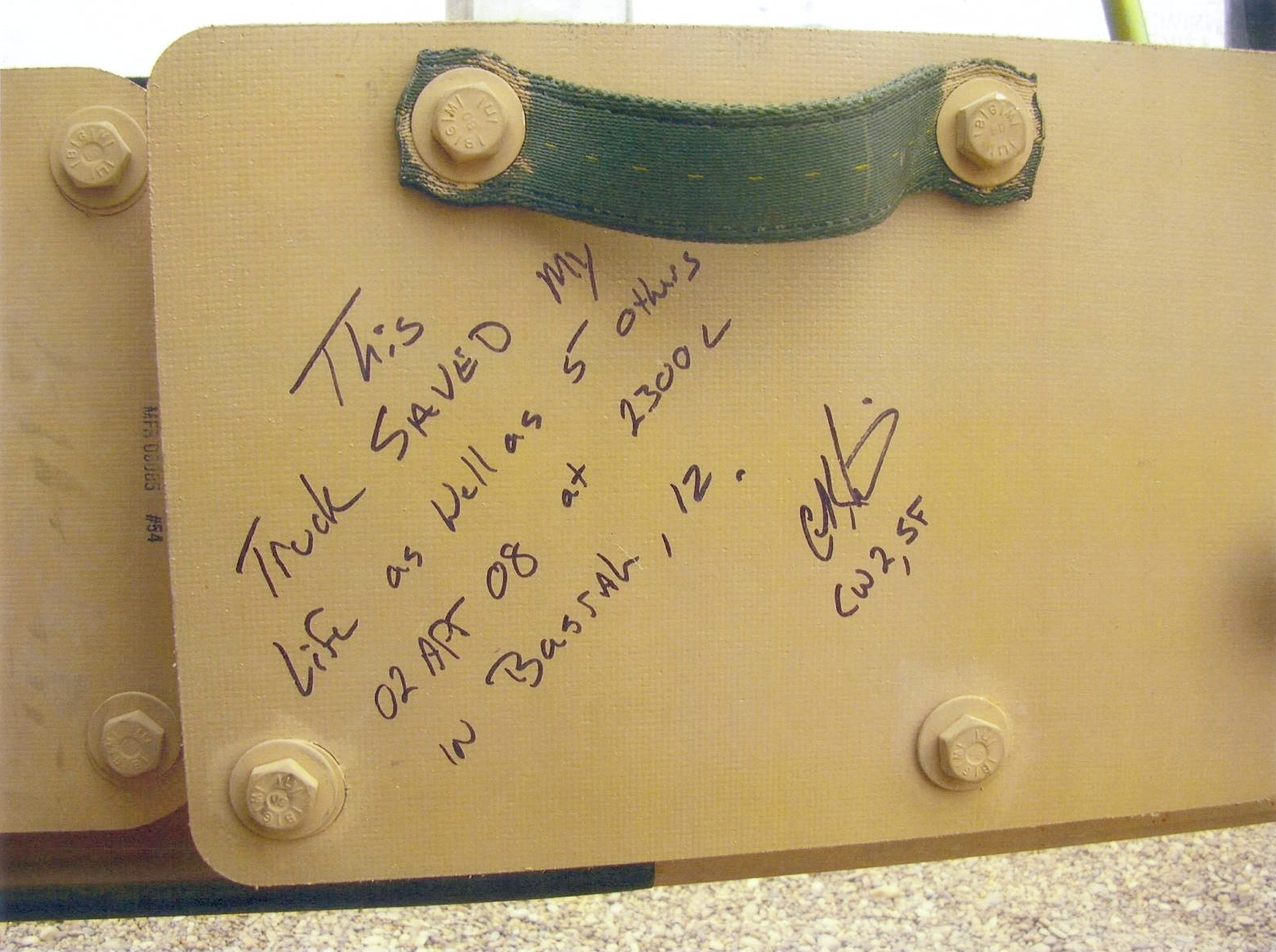
Writing on the door of an MRAP reads "This truck saved my life as well as 5 others on 02 Apr 08 at 2300 L(local) in Basrah, IZ. [Signature] CW2, SF".

In 2004, the United States Marine Corps reported that no troops had died in more than 300 IED attacks on Cougar vehicles. In 2007, Secretary of Defense Robert Gates decided to increase MRAP vehicle orders. On 8 May 2007, Gates announced that acquisition of MRAPs was the Department of Defense's highest priority for fiscal year 2007; $1.1 billion was earmarked. A 2008 GAO report found that Marine combat planners had delayed "an urgent request in 2005 for 1,169 MRAPs", primarily because then-commandant General Michael Hagee wanted to preserve funding for up-armoring Humvees, believing they were the quickest way to protect Marines from roadside bomb threats.

In late 2007, the Marine Corps planned to replace all Humvees in combat zones with MRAP vehicles, although that changed. As armored vehicles were considered an urgent need in Afghanistan, the MRAP program was primarily funded under an "emergency war budget".

Originally, Brigadier General Michael Brogan was in charge of the Marine MRAP program; he was succeeded by Brigadier General Frank Kelley, Commander, United States Marine Corps Systems Command. The Army MRAP program was managed by Kevin Fahey, U.S. Army Program Executive Officer for Combat Support and Combat Service Support.

=== 2007 ===
In 2007, the Pentagon ordered about 10,000 MRAPs at a cost of over $500,000 each, and planned to order more.

Partial list of January–July 2007 orders
Service	Supplier	Vehicle (category)	Quantity	Contract price $M
Marines	FPI	Cougar H (I), Cougar HE (II)	2, 2	
Marines	FPI	Cougar H (I), Cougar HE (II)	65, 60	67
Marines	BAE	RG-33 (I), BAE RG-33L (II)	15, 75	55.4
Marines	FPI	Cougar H (I), Cougar HE (II)	300, 700	481.4
Marines	International	MaxxPro (I)	1200	623
Marines	FPI	Buffalo (II)	14	11.9
Marines, Army	FPI	Cougar (I), (II)	395, 60	221
Marines, Army	International	MaxxPro XL (II)	16	8
SOC	BAE Systems	RG-33 (I) (patrol), RG-33L (II), RG-33 (I), RG-33L (II) (ambulance)	16, 239, 170, 16	235.8
Marines	Stewart & Stevenson (Armor Holdings)	(I), (II)	1154 ,16	518.5
	International	MaxxPro	755	
	General Dynamics Land Systems Canada	RG-31 (II)	600	338.7
Marines	FPI	Cougar H, (I), Cougar HE (II)	25, 100	69.8
Pentagon	International	(I)	533	509
Pentagon	FPI	(II)	247	377
Pentagon	BAE	RG-33L (II) standard, ambulance	399, 112	278
SOC	BAE	RG33 Mod 5 (I)	89	44
	Navistar	MaxxPro (I)	1500	1120
	BAE	(I)	600	645
	Armor Holdings	(I), (II)	668, 178	458
	PFI	Cougar (II)	180	378

=== 2008 ===
On 14 March 2008, the U.S. military ordered 1,024 (2) Caimans from BAE (worth $481.8 million), 743 (1) MaxxPros from Navistar ($410.7 million), and special command vehicles and ambulances from BAE ($234 million). On 17 July 2007, the U.S. Marine Corps System Command ordered 773 RG31 (1) MRAPs ($552M) from General Dynamics Land Systems Canada for delivery by April 2009. On 19 June 2007 the U.S. Army ordered an additional 44 BAE RG-31 Mk 5 vehicles and an additional 369 M1117 ASVs.

The MRAP Armor Weight Reduction Spiral (MAWRS) Program reduced weight by 40 percent, and was fielded on more than 10,000 MRAP vehicles in 2008. The program was led by the Army Research Laboratory.

Forecasting the need for better and lighter protection from IEDs, ARL developed aggressive weight-reduction goals and set out to demonstrate practical technology options by the end of the 2008 financial year.

The program's technical approach was to exploit computing and terminal-effects experimentation to scale known technologies, understand the most viable armor mechanisms for penetrator defeat, and to introduce light-weight composites, new materials, and enhanced ballistic mechanisms to reduce weight.

The ARL's MAWRS program was recognized by U.S. Army Materiel Command as among the "Top Ten Great Inventions of 2008."

=== 2009 ===
Oshkosh was awarded a $1.06 B firm-fixed-priced delivery order to exercise an option for 1,700 MRAP All Terrain Vehicles. A similar Army contract for 1,700 MRAP ATVs was valued at a further $1.06 B. By 2009, the U.S. Department of Defense had spent $20 billion on the MRAP program. Total MRAP program expenditure with final deliveries was expected to be $48.5 billion (FY10-11).

== Criticism ==
The MRAP program was criticized for its nearly $50 billion cost, the potential logistical difficulties due to high fuel consumption and varied designs, decreased connection between troops and the local population due to MRAPs' size and appearance, which conflicted with counter-insurgency (COIN) strategy, and unclear disposal routes. In 2007, the post-war fate of MRAPs was uncertain, given their high transport and operational costs. MRAP funding pulled money away from other tactical vehicle programs, most noticeably the Joint Light Tactical Vehicle, which was delayed by two years.

According to Army Times, troops openly wondered about some MRAPs. One question centered around the inwards-facing design of the rear seats, given that an outward-facing design would have allowed troops to fire through ports, which some versions lacked. The height and steepness of the dropdown stairs at the rear of some versions was claimed to hamper vehicle exit. Troops riding in the rear could easily hit their heads on the ceiling in rough terrain, thereby risking serious brain and spinal injuries.

Earlier reports had stated that the MRAP was well received, with US troops stating that they would rather be hit by an IED in an MRAP than in a Humvee.

=== Rollovers and electric shock ===
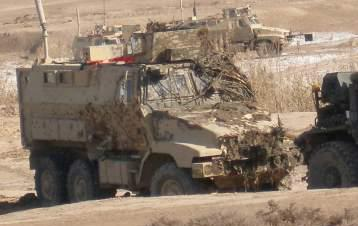
A Caiman after rolling into a ditch

A 13 June 2008 Marine Corps report exposed concerns about rollovers. The V-shaped hulls of the MRAP vehicles raised their centers of gravity, and the weight can damage the badly built/poorly maintained roads in rural Iraq or Afghanistan to the point of collapse. Almost 40 of the 66 MRAP accidents between 7 November 2007 and 8 June 2008 were due to rollovers. In many of the rollovers, troops were injured. In two separate incidents, five soldiers were killed by rolling over into a canal, trapping the soldiers underwater with no means of escape. The report said 75% of all rollovers occurred in rural areas, often where roads had been built above grade with an adjacent ditch or canal.

The report also raised concerns associated with MRAP vehicles snagging on low-hanging power lines or its antennas passing close enough to create an electric arc, which might electrocute the passengers.

=== Effectiveness ===
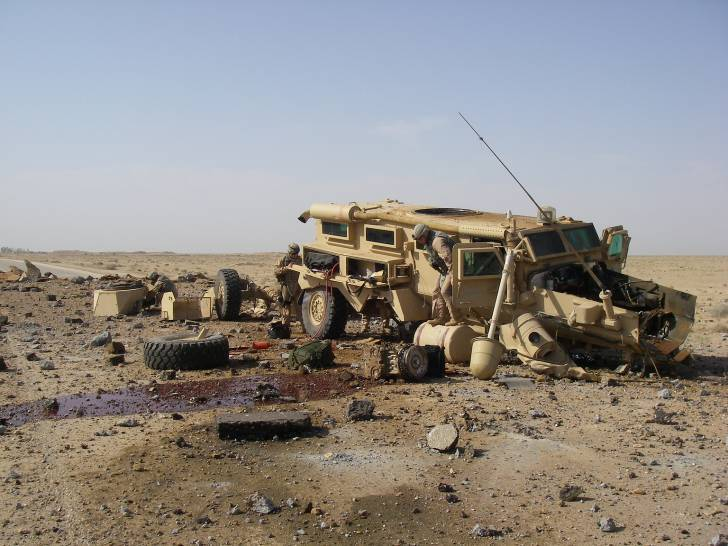
Cougar MRAP hit by a large IED in Iraq. All crew survived.

The MRAP may not be sufficiently effective against Explosively Formed Penetrators (EFP), which use an explosive charge to propel a specially shaped metal plate at high velocity while simultaneously forming it into an armor-piercing projectile. In Iraq, EFP use more than doubled in 2006. In 2007, 11 percent of all roadside bomb fatalities were due to EFPs. In 2007, the Marines had estimated that MRAPs could reduce IED casualties in Iraq by as much as 80 percent.

This MRAP weakness was addressed by the next-generation MRAP II. As an interim solution, the military installed a variant of the Humvee's IED-defeating Frag Kit 6 armor, which adds significant weight and width. In July 2008, the U.S. military reported the number of EFP attacks had dropped by 70 percent.

On 19 January 2008, a 3rd Infantry Division U.S. Army soldier, Specialist Richard Burress, operating as the exposed turret gunner was killed in a Navistar MaxxPro MRAP by an ANFO IED estimated at 600 lb (270 kg). It is unknown whether the gunner was killed by the explosion or by the subsequent vehicle rollover. The v-hull was not compromised. The crew compartment also appeared to be uncompromised, and the three other crew members inside the vehicle survived.

Although this was reported as the first MRAP combat death, later reports stated that three soldiers had earlier been killed by IEDs in RG-31s and two by EFPs in Buffalos. As of 6 May 2008, eight soldiers had been reported killed in the thousands of MRAPs in Iraq. In June 2008, USA Today reported that roadside bomb attacks and fatalities were down almost 90%, partially due to MRAPs. "They've taken hits, many, many hits that would have killed soldiers and Marines in unarmored Humvees," according to Adm. Michael Mullen, chairman of the Joint Chiefs of Staff.

Major General Rick Lynch, who commanded a division in Baghdad, told USA Today that the 14-ton MRAPs had forced insurgents to build bigger, more sophisticated bombs. Those bombs are more difficult to build and set up, increasing the chance of catching the insurgents. According to Marinetimes.com, the Taliban focused their efforts away from anti-materiel IEDs and more toward smaller anti-personnel bombs to target soldiers on patrol.

The MRAP program is similar to the United States Army's Medium Mine Protected Vehicle program.

=== Logistics ===
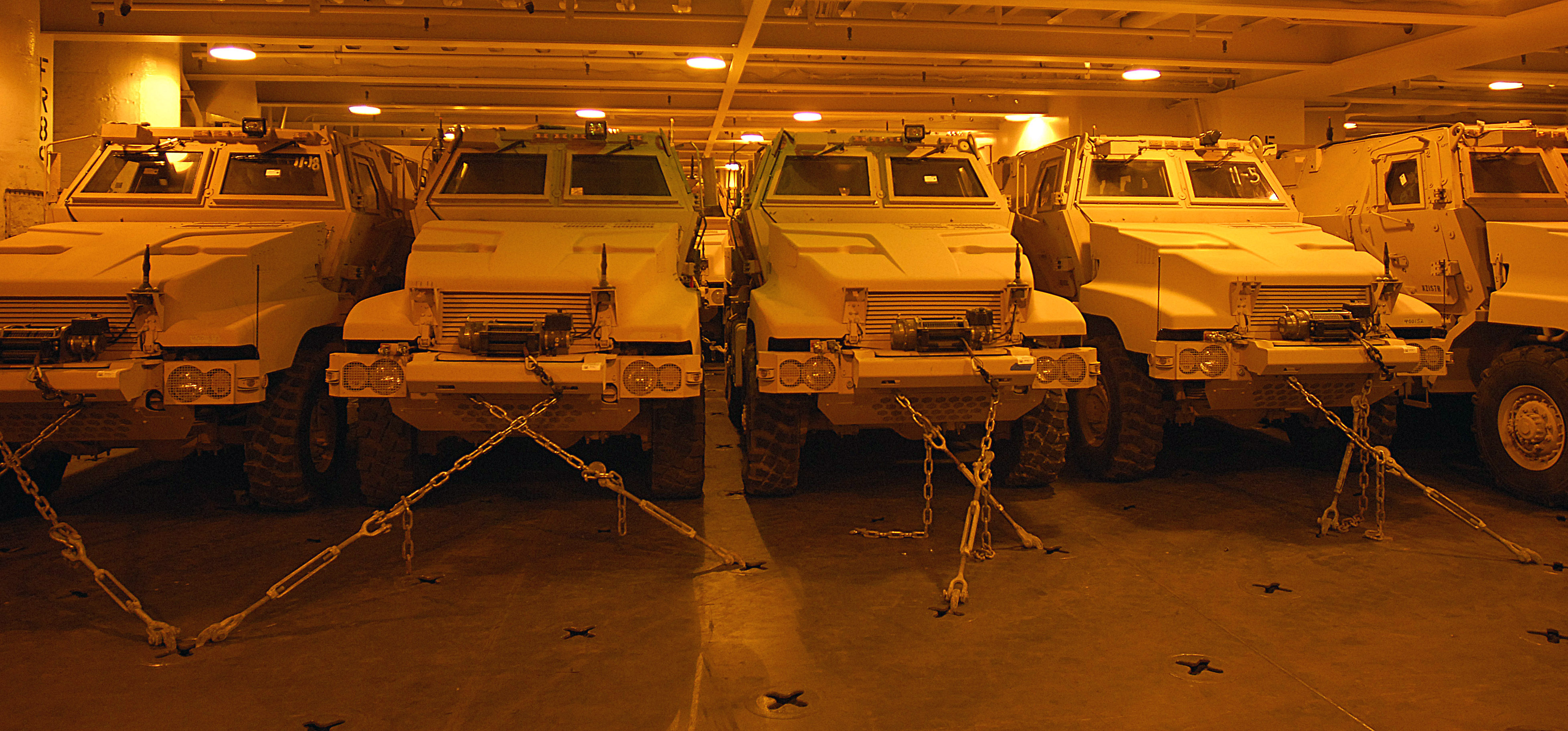
Mine resistant ambush protected vehicles (MRAP) are offloaded from the Military Sealift Command roll-on/roll-off ship USNS Pililaau (T-AKR 304) onto the pier.

The MRAP program's lack of a common design presented a logistic challenge, but the diversity of MRAP vehicles also conferred an advantage. Their weight and size limits their use away from main roads, in urban areas, and over bridges, as 72 percent of the world's bridges cannot support the MRAP. Their heft restricts transport by C-130 cargo aircraft or amphibious ships. Three MRAP vehicles (or five Oshkosh M-ATVs) fit in a C-17 aircraft, and airlifting is expensive, at $150,000 per vehicle.

The US Air Force contracted several Russian Antonov An-124 heavy-cargo aircraft, which became a familiar sight above cities such as Charleston, South Carolina, where some MRAPs were produced. For comparison, sealifting costs around $13,000 per vehicle, but takes 3–4 weeks. In December 2007, the Marine Corps reduced its request from 3,700 vehicles to 2,300. The Army also reassessed its MRAP requirements. In January 2010, 400 were flown into Afghanistan, increasing to 500 a month in February, but the goal of 1,000 a month was scaled back because of distribution and training difficulties.

== Post-war applications ==
Following the Iraq War and the War in Afghanistan, questions arose as to what to do with MRAPs, as they were designed specifically for asymmetric warfare. The Army decided they would keep them in some sort of service. Of the approximately 20,000 MRAPs in service, 30 percent (6,000) would stay in brigade combat teams as troop transports and route clearance vehicles, 10 percent (2,000) would move to training, and the rest would go into storage. MRAPs were to be superseded by the JLTV in 2016. They may still be used until 2022, when the JLTV achieves sufficient numbers.

On 1 October 2012, the Pentagon officially closed the MRAP production line. As of that date, 27,740 MRAP vehicles had been fielded from seven manufacturers, 12,726 vehicles were still in Afghanistan, about 870 were sold to foreign militaries, and 700 were on foreign order.

=== Surplus MRAPs ===
In early July 2012, five MRAP vehicles were delivered to the 2nd Infantry Division in the Korean Peninsula. The 2ID tested over 50 vehicles to see how they would be used there and whether their capabilities were right for Korea. In addition to force protection, MRAPs provided a platform for "mission command-on-the-move" to protect command-and-control capabilities while moving across the battlefield. Most MRAPs in Korea were redeployed to Iraq or Afghanistan.

North Korean military officials claimed MRAPs would be used to safely cross the DMZ to attack the North, and said the forward deployment of such military hardware disturbed peace and stability. However, by August 2013, the 2ID had decided not to utilize the over 80 MRAPs on the peninsula. They determined the vehicles were "not suitable for maneuver battalions to use" and no plans involved adding MRAPs. The vehicles were returned to the Army fleet management system.

In 2013 the U.S. government attempted to sell about 2,000 out of the 11,000 MRAPs in Afghanistan. The logistical and financial task of bringing the vehicles back to the U.S. ($50,000 per vehicle), or destroying some in-country, was prohibitive. Destruction costs were estimated to be $10,000 per vehicle.

In September 2014, the U.S. approved a $2.5 billion deal with the United Arab Emirates Army for over 4,500 surplus U.S. MRAPs. 1,150 vehicles were Caimans.

The U.S. government approved transferring 930 MRAP vehicles to Egypt using the Excess Defense Articles Grant Program. The MRAP vehicles were donated, although Egypt had to pay for shipment and refurbishment.

Pakistan requested MRAPs through the Excess Defense Articles program. It offered to buy them and transport from Afghanistan to Pakistan. After the US rejected the offer, Pakistan bought 200 new MRAPs.

The Defense Department was expected to send 250 MRAPs to Iraq. Iraqi forces were equipped with MRAPs after the U.S. withdrawal in 2011, but many were captured by ISIL during the June 2014 Northern Iraq offensive, and subsequently destroyed by American air strikes. The vehicles were to be transferred, rather than sold, as excess defense articles and be drawn from the U.S. stock of 1,500 MRAPs stored in Kuwait. Of the 250 vehicles, 225 were for Iraqi Security Forces, while 25 were to be given to Kurdish Peshmerga forces.

In 2015 around 20 MRAPs were donated to the African Union mission in Somalia. Uzbekistan received 308 MRAP vehicles.

NATO allied countries also acquired surplus MRAPs. Polish Special Forces received 45 M-ATV vehicles. Croatia received 212 Oshkosh M-ATV. These vehicles were transferred within the framework of the Excess Defense Articles program.

In 2022, the U.S. government sent 40 MaxxPro MRAP vehicles to Ukraine as part of a package of military aid under Presidential Drawdown Authority. On October 4, 2022, the U.S. approved the provision of a further 200 MaxxPro MRAPs.

=== Post-war reductions ===
As of September 2013, the U.S. Marine Corps had 3,700–3,800 MRAP vehicles and planned to reduce their inventory to 1,200–1,300 due to sequestration budget cuts, but then increased that number to 2,500 vehicles in May 2014.

In 2013, the U.S. government planned to keep about 5,600 of 8700 M-ATVs, with some 250 vehicles for U.S. Special Operations Command. From 2007 to 2011, the Army bought about 9,000 Navistar MaxxPro vehicles, but planned to keep only about 3,000.

Following the drawdown from Afghanistan by the end of 2014, the U.S. Army planned to reduce its MRAP fleet to 8,000 vehicles. The Army planned to divest 7,456 vehicles and retain 8,585. 5,036 were to be put in storage, 1,073 used for training and the remainder spread across the force. The M-ATV will keep at most 5,681 vehicles, as it is smaller and lighter than other MRAPs. The other most retained vehicle was the MaxxPro Dash with 2,633 vehicles and 301 MaxxPro ambulances; other MRAPs such as the Cougar, Caiman, and larger MaxxPros were to be eliminated. The Army estimated in 2014 that "it will need to spend $1.7 billion in supplemental wartime dollars over the next several years to modernize and retain 8,585 mine-resistant, ambush-protected vehicles, while divesting itself of another 7,456 MRAPs it no longer needs."

=== Law enforcement ===
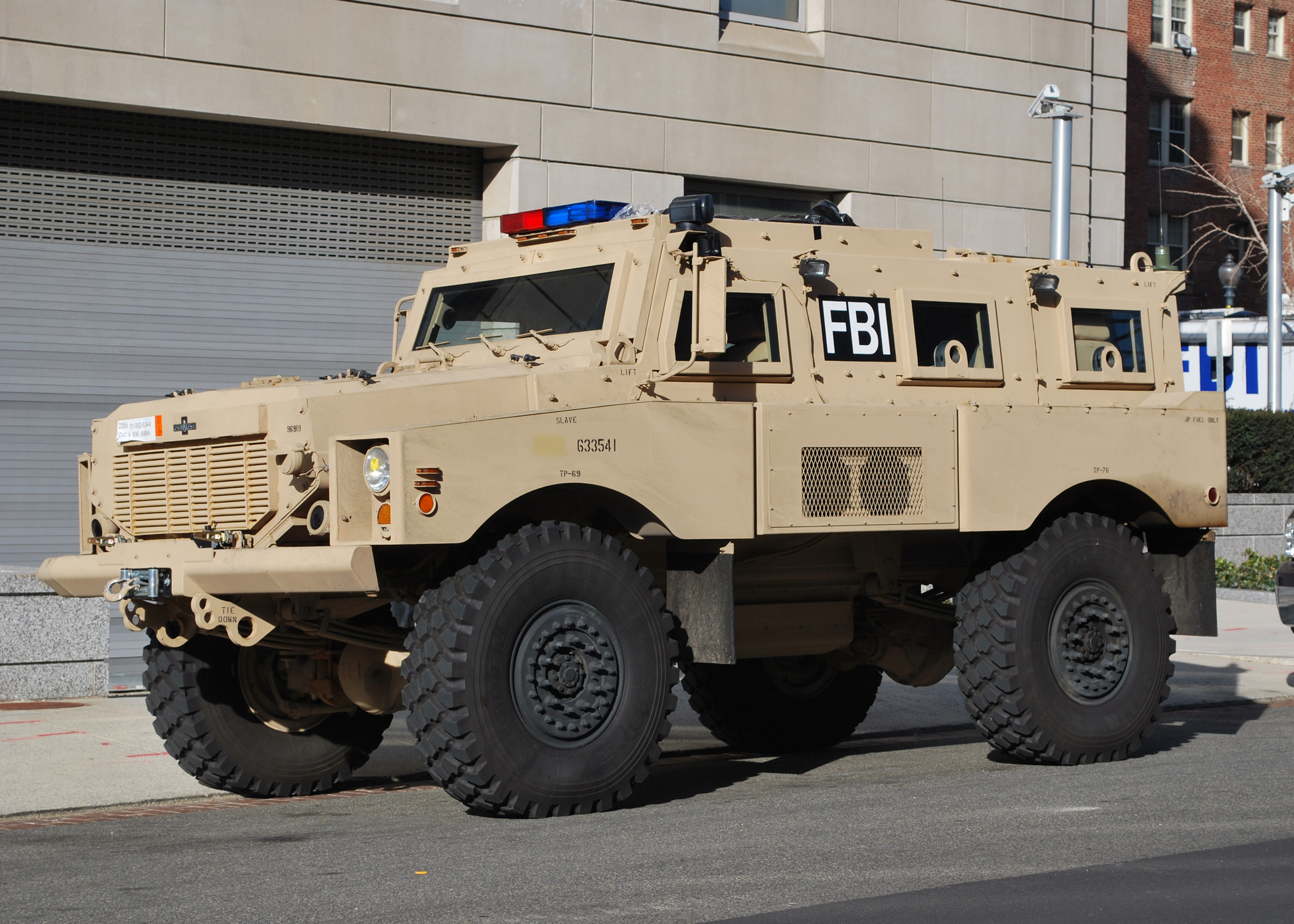
MRAP in use with the Federal Bureau of Investigation

The United States Department of Homeland Security Rapid Response Teams used MRAPs to assist people affected by hurricanes in 2012, and to pull damaged government vehicles onto the street so they could be towed. The Federal Bureau of Investigation used an MRAP-type vehicle in a child kidnapping case in Midland, Alabama, in 2013.

The Department of Defense's Defense Logistics Agency was tasked with off-loading 13,000 MRAPs to 780 domestic law enforcement agencies on waiting lists for vehicles. The DLA does not transfer property to the agencies, so the vehicles are allocated to the agencies with costs picked up by them or the state, while the vehicles remain Defense Department property. To receive an armored vehicle, a requesting agency has to meet criteria including justification for use (such as for shooting incidents, SWAT operations and drug interdiction), geographical area and multi-jurisdiction use, the ability to pay for repairs and maintenance, and security and restricted vehicle access.

U.S. law enforcement agencies can acquire MRAP vehicles through the Law Enforcement Support Office, which redistributes unneeded military equipment to state and municipal agencies. Some police departments acquired MRAPs with no transfer costs or fees. Domestic agencies planned to use them in disaster relief roles, as they can cross flooded areas and provide security in response to terrorist threats. Some MRAPs used by police forces have the turret removed and are repainted black.

The use of MRAPs by law enforcement is controversial. The American Civil Liberties Union voiced concerns about police militarization and argued that military hardware could escalate violent situations. Many MRAPs were obtained by small police forces that rarely handle relevant incidents. Though the MRAPs were obtained for free, the drawbacks are weight (as much as 18 tons), low fuel efficiency, and expensive refitting for law enforcement use; a closed turret, new seating, loudspeakers, and emergency lights can cost around $70,000.

=== NASA usage ===
NASA operated multiple MRAPs for emergency evacuations of Orion spacecraft on launch pads.
