= Medium Tactical Vehicle Replacement =

Family of American 6x6 tactical trucks

MTVR
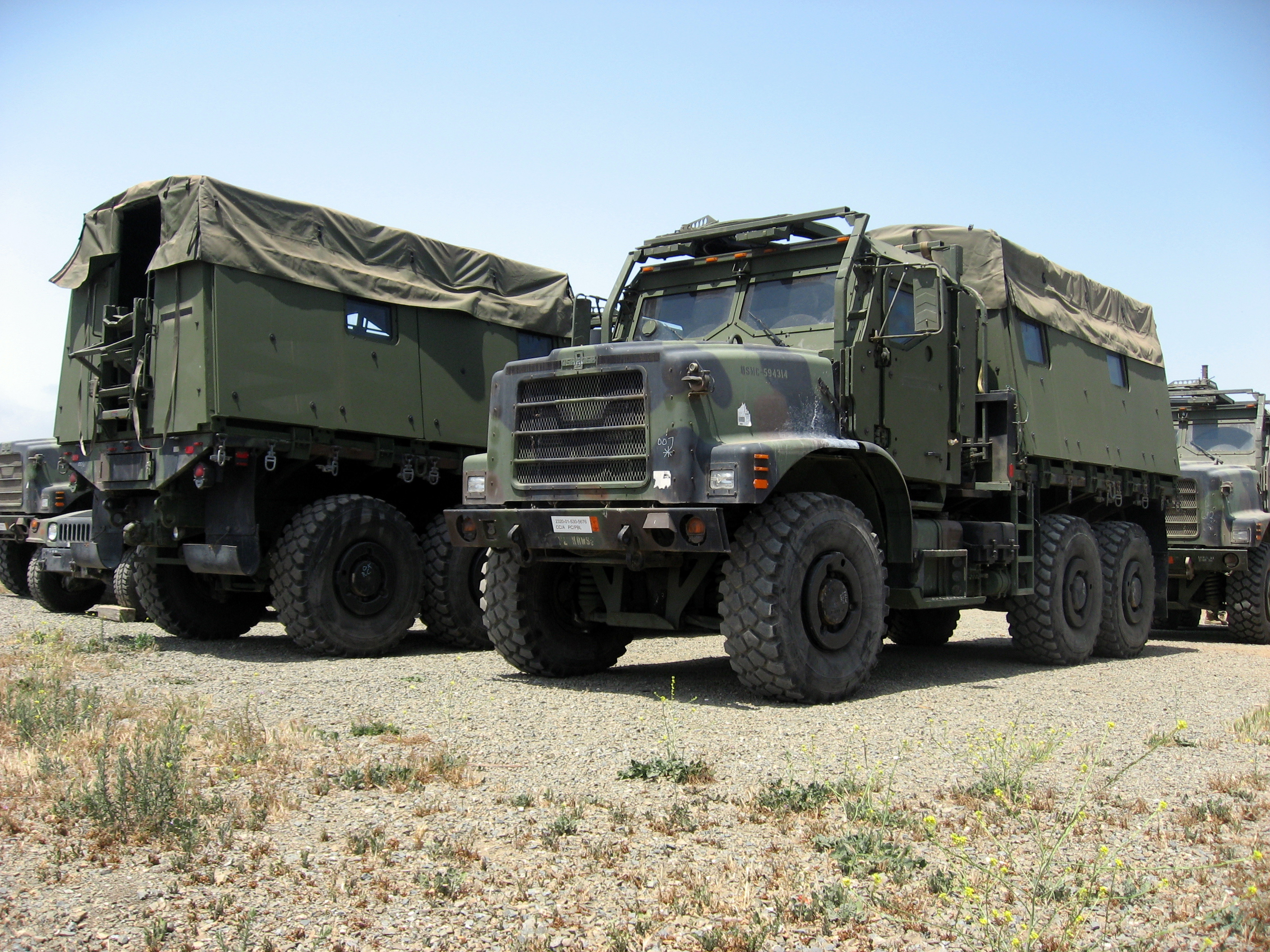
- MTVR MK23 standard cargo trucks with Armor Protection Kits (APKs) and armored rear troop carrier compartments
- Type: Family of 6x6 tactical trucks with 7-tons of off road payload (U.S. tons). On road payload up to 15 U.S. tons.
- Place of origin: United States

Service history
- In service: 2001–present
- Used by: U.S. Marine Corps and others (see Operators)

Production history
- Designer: Oshkosh Defense
- Designed: 1996 (initial development contract)
- Manufacturer: Oshkosh Defense
- Produced: 1999–present
- No. built: 11,359 to U.S. Marines/Navy, plus 430 (est.) export sales
- Variants: (full details in main text): MK23 - standard cargo truck, 184 in wheelbase; MK25 - standard cargo truck with winch, 184 in wheelbase; MK27 - extended cargo truck, 216 in wheelbase; MK28 - extended cargo truck with winch, 216 in wheelbase; MK29 - dump truck without winch, 184 in wheelbase; MK30 - dump truck with winch, 184 in wheelbase; MK36 - wrecker, 216 in wheelbase; MK31 - tractor, 184 in wheelbase; MK28C - replacement for Special Purpose Vehicle types, 216 in wheelbase; MK37 - HIMARS resupply, 216 in wheelbase (based on MK27); MK38 - HIMARS trailer

MK23 standard cargo truck

Specifications
- Mass: 13,200 kg (29,100 lbs) (curb w/fuel)
- Length: 8 m (314.9 in)
- Width: 2.49 m (98 in)
- Height: 3.185 m (125.4 in) (cab; reducible for transport)
- Crew: 2
- Armor: a-kit/b-kit; U.S. Army Long Term Armor Strategy (LTAS) compliant
- Engine: Caterpillar (CAT) C-12 Advanced Diesel Engine Management (ADEM) III, 11.9-liter, 6-cylinder inline water-cooled diesel developing 425 hp @ 1800 rpm and 1,550 ft-lb torque at 2100 rpm
- Payload capacity: 14,199 lbs / 7 U.S. tons off-road 30,000 lbs / 15 U.S. tons payload on primary & secondary roads
- Transmission: Allison HD 4070P 7-speed automatic and Oshkosh 30000 single-speed with torque proportioning differential and manual differential lock
- Suspension: Oshkosh TAK-4 independent suspension, coil spring upper/lower control arms; anti-roll bar on second and third axles. Front axle rated at 16,000 lb, second at 23,500 lb, third at 25,500 lb
- Fuel capacity: 295 L (78 gal)
- Operational range: 483 km (300 mi)
- Maximum speed: 105 km/h (65 mph)
- Steering system: Power-assisted, front axle (third axle contra-steer on MK31 tractor)

The Medium Tactical Vehicle Replacement (MTVR) is a family of medium to heavy six-wheel drive cargo and tactical trucks, used by the United States Marine Corps. The first MTVRs were delivered in late 1999. The MTVR is the equivalent of the U.S. Army's Family of Medium Tactical Vehicles (FMTV); the Marines do not use the FMTV (with the exception of the FMTV-based HIMARS) and the Army does not use the MTVR.

There were originally four, later seven, MTVR variants, then nine (plus a sub-variant) as deliveries and development continued. A dedicated trailer and prototype/developmental MTVRs have also been produced.

The MTVR was designed and is manufactured by Oshkosh Defense.

== Development and production history ==
The MTVR has its design origins in two U.S. military programs, the 5 ton Tactical Truck Replacement (5TTR) for the U.S. Army, and the Medium Tactical Vehicle Replacement (MTVR) for the U.S. Marines. The aim of these programs was to upgrade and extend the service life of around 3,400 U.S. Army M939 series 5 ton trucks, and 8,100 U.S. Marines M809 and M939 series 5 ton trucks. Prototype and development contracts for both programs were awarded in 1996. The 5TTR program was subsequently halted, and the MTVR program evolved from an upgrade to a new-build requirement.

Oshkosh was awarded a multi-year MTVR production contract in February, 1999. The first vehicles were scheduled for delivery by the end of 1999, and deliveries under the initial contract concluded during August 2005. The award initially allowed for up to 8,168 MTVRs (including options for 2,502) in four variants (MK23, MK25, MK27, MK28) to be ordered over five program years; 6,931 MTVRs were delivered, 6,393 to the Marines and 538 to the Navy (Seabees). The first MTVRs were fielded in July 2001. Three additional variants followed; the MK29, MK30 and MK36.

Under a separate contract, Oshkosh commenced production in July 2004 of a further MTVR variant, the MK37. Based on the MK27 and fitted with a rear-mounted Hiab materials handling crane rated at 10,000 lb at 10.5 ft maximum reach, the MK37 is a resupply vehicle for the U.S. Marines HIgh Mobility Artillery Rocket System (HIMARS). The companion trailer is designated MK38.

Oshkosh was awarded a second MTVR multi-year contract (FY05-FY10) in July 2004. This award initially covered only potential Foreign Military Sales (FMS), plus the continuing requirements of the U.S. Navy. Ultimately the U.S. Navy and Marines combined received >2,000 vehicles under this contract.

In 2005, the MK31 Medium Equipment Transporter (MET) tractor entered service with Seabees, and later in the year with the Marines.

The MK28C is a variant of the MK28. The MK28C (C - chassis) replaced Special Purpose Vehicle (SPV) types, these based on a mix of tactical and commercial truck chassis and including: water distributor, 2,000 US gallon; fuel, 1,500 US gallon; field service; asphalt distributor; earth auger. Interchangeable commercial-off-the-shelf (COTS) - or modified COTS - bodies are fitted to MK28C chassis as field circumstances dictate.

Also in 2005, Oshkosh was awarded a contract to re-manufacture an initial 27 MTVRs to new configuration and with a full new vehicle warranty.

On 16 May 2008 the 10,000th MTVR was completed. By late 2011 an estimated 11,135 MTVRs had been ordered, that figure including 9,221 for the USMC and 1,855 for the Navy.

In FY12 the third (and final) five-year multi-year MTVR contract was awarded to Oshkosh. The final known MTVR delivery order (US$67 m for 338 vehicles; 278 Marines, 60 Seabees) was placed in September 2012, and inclusive of this order 11,359 MTVRs were ordered by the US Marines, about 1900 of these for the Navy. Orders under the final contract could be placed until June 2016.

In conjunction with Pierce Manufacturing (an Oshkosh Corporation company), Oshkosh developed the MTVR MK23/25-based Hawk Extreme, a wildland firefighting water tender. This product has been sold commercially.

== Technical description ==
All production versions of the MTVR are based on the same 6×6 drive configuration and utilize a chassis constructed using bolted / Huck-bolted, formed channel (9.75 × 3 × 0.38 in) made of heat-treated carbon manganese steel with a yield strength of 110,000 psi minimum. The engine is located under a forward fiberglass hood. The cab seats three and is of welded aluminium extrusion construction with adhesive bonded aluminium skins. The cab folds down to reduce overall height to 98 in and from mid-2007, production vehicles are armor-ready and have air-conditioning, revised cab mounts and upgraded cab suspension.

With the exception of the UK's Wheeled Tanker variants, all MTVRs are powered by a Caterpillar C-12, Advanced Diesel Engine Management (ADEM) III 11.9-liter six-cylinder diesel engine that develops 425 hp at 1,800 rpm and 1,550 ft-lb of torque at 1,200 rpm. When the central tire inflation system (CTIS) is set at 0 to 2 tons payload, engine power output is automatically reduced by around 20%. Driveline is completed by an Allison HD 4070P seven-speed automatic transmission, TC-541 torque converter and an Oshkosh 30000 Series single-speed transfer case. All-wheel drive is permanent and under highway driving conditions the torque split is 32% front, 68% rear.

Oshkosh TAK-4 independent coil spring suspension is fitted to the MTVR, this providing each front wheel with a total vertical travel of 16.0 in and a travel of 12.8 in on the rear axles. The front axle is rated at 16,000 lb, the second at 23,500 lb, the third at 25,400 lb. The MK36 wrecker and MK31 tractor variants have Hendrickson hydraulic suspension on the rear axles.

Standard tires fitted to the MTVR are Michelin 1600 R20 XZL and with the exception of the MK36 wrecker variant, no spare is carried. Compensating for no spare is a runflat setting option on the CTIS. CTIS allows the driver to adjust tire pressures to suit both payload and terrain conditions, from the driving seat. The two-piece bolt-together steel wheel rims are fitted with beadlocks for extreme low-pressure operations and tires will remain seated at pressures down to 10 psi. In the event that any one tire should fail totally, a limp-home facility allows for a second axle suspension unit to be raised and secured.

Mobility parameters include a climatic operational range of -50 °F to 125 °F. The MTVR has a maximum speed of 65 mph and on-road cruising range of 300 mi. It can climb a 60% gradient and traverse a 40% side slope with its maximum cross-country load. It can ford 60in of water. Turning radius and approach, departure, and ramp breakover angles vary by variant.

MTVR variants can be internally transported by C-5, C-17 and C-130 Hercules transport aircraft. The MK23 can be transported underslung by CH-53 helicopter.

The original MTVR trailer was designed and developed by Oshkosh to provide a matching trailer for the MTVR truck. Two prototype MTVR trailers were manufactured and tested between May 2000 and March 2001. In June 2005 the U.S. Marine Corps System Command (MARCORSYSCOM) awarded the Choctaw Manufacturing and Developing Corporation (CMDC) a $1.9 million Small Business Sole Source design and development contract for the MTVR Trailer. Oshkosh manufactures and supplies the associated trailers for the MK37 HIMARS resupply variant.

== MTVR Armor Systems (MAS) ==
Oshkosh promotes the current MTVR armor packages as the MTVR Armor Systems (MAS). The current Standard MAS with Survivability Upgrade (MAS-SU) kit is available for a variety of models. The Reducible Height MAS (MAS-RH) is also available. Installation of armor requires a vehicle front axle and cab suspension mount upgrade, plus a revision to the cab roof gun mount. Air-conditioning is also fitted. From mid-2007 all production MTVRs have been armor ready, these modifications now forming part of the standard vehicle specification.

Development of a protection kit for the MTVR commenced in 2003, with the first production contract awarded in 2004 and calling for 920 baseline appliqué APKs for the cab, plus 460 modular armored rear troop carrier compartments. The cab and troop carrier kits, while complementary, are separate units and can be installed as such. A follow-on contract for 930 cab kits and 465 rear troop-carrier compartments was awarded in 2005. Two further contracts for a total of 293 cab kits were awarded in 2007. Oshkosh announced in August 2008 an initial contract award for height reducible armor kits for MVTRs. Around 2400 height reducible armor kits for MVTRs have been ordered. Additional awards for armor/protection-related upgrades have been made.

A small arms fire and mine blast protection kit for the U.K. MoD's MTVR-fronted Wheeled Tanker fleet has been developed and fitted to vehicles used on overseas operations.

== Gallery ==
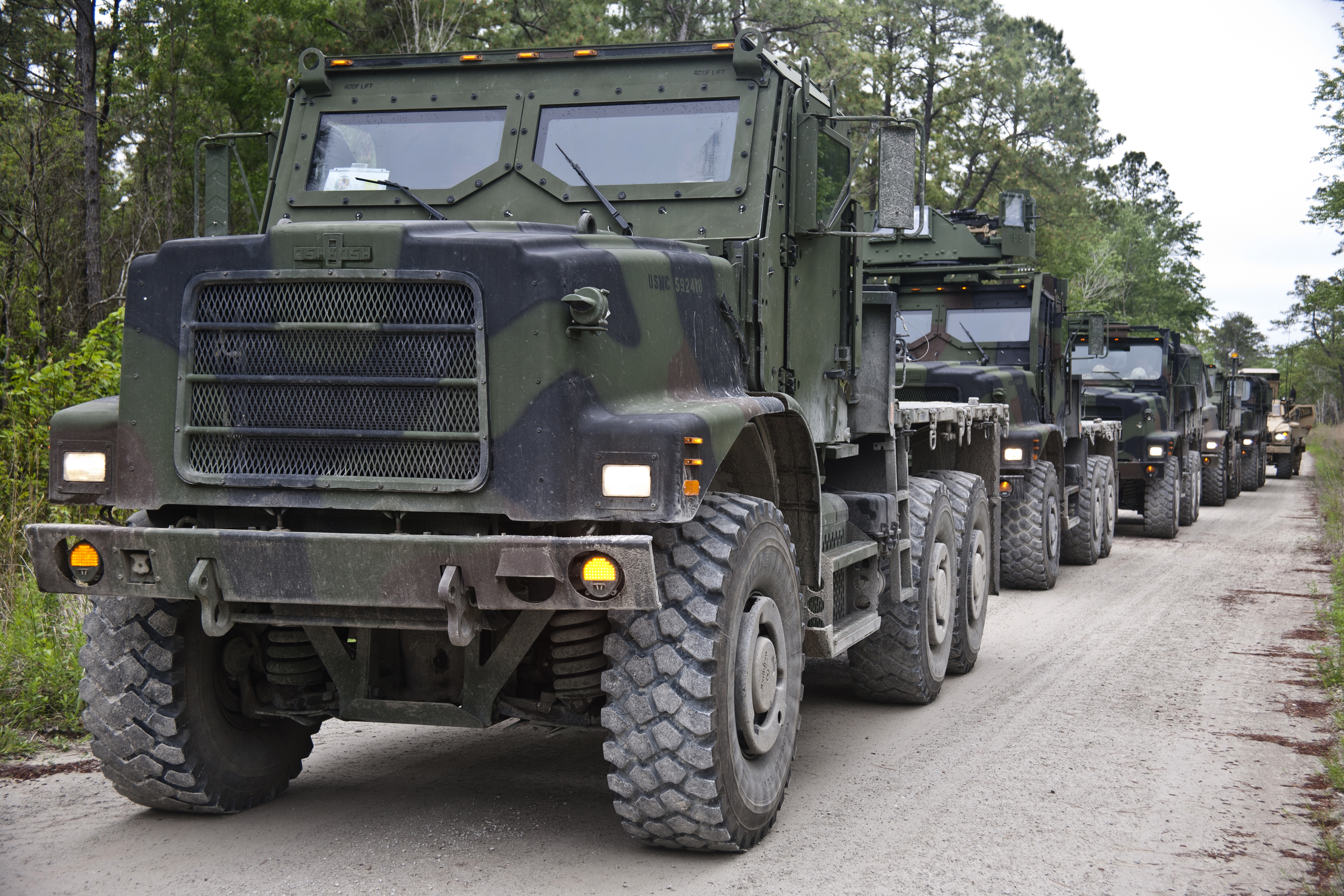
Designation for standard cargo 4.674 m wheelbase MTVRs is MK23 or MK25 (with winch). This MK23/MK25 is fitted with an armored cab.

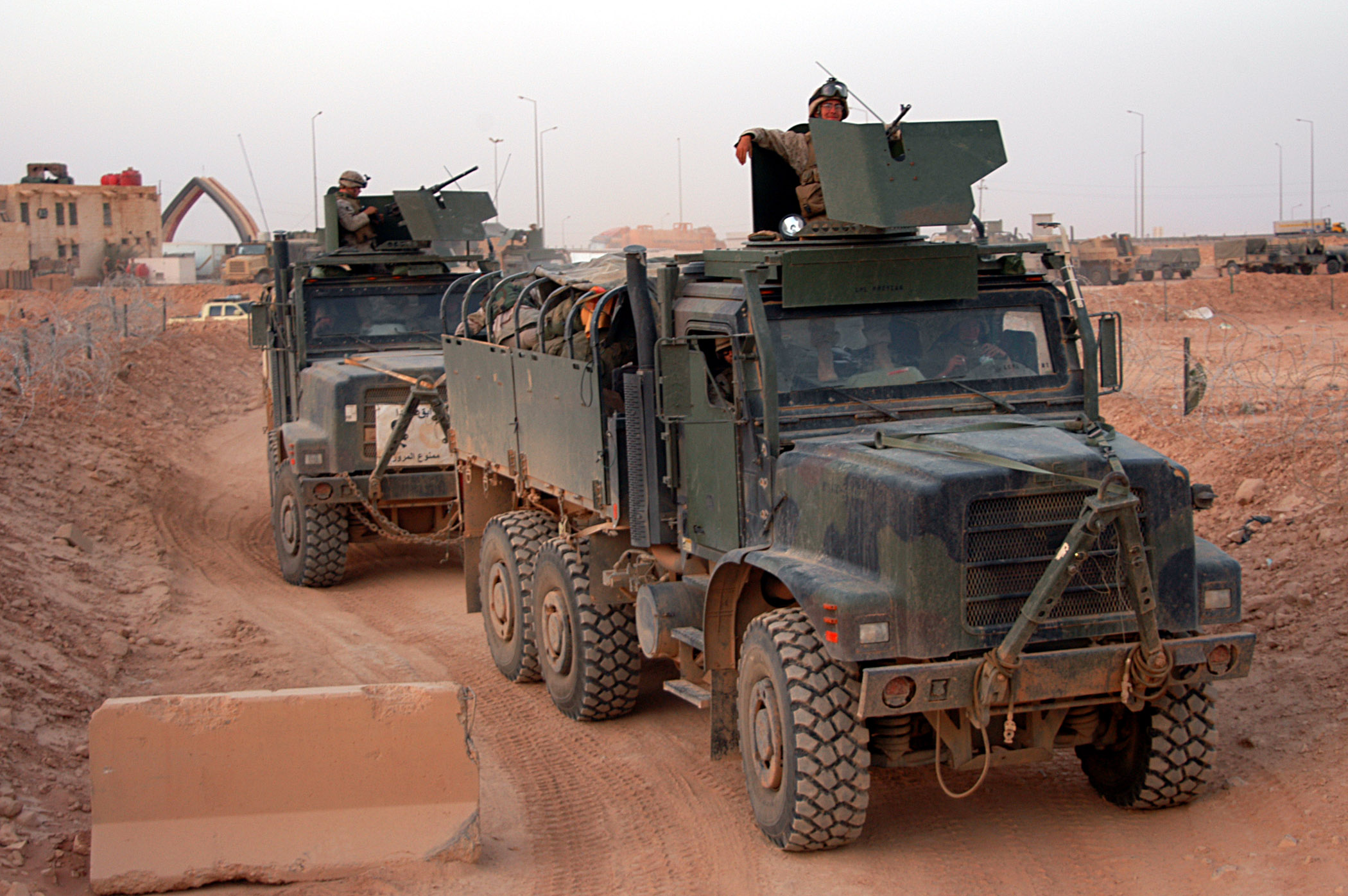
Prior to development of an official armor kit for the MTVR in 2003, MTVRs were fitted with a variety of interim armor solutions

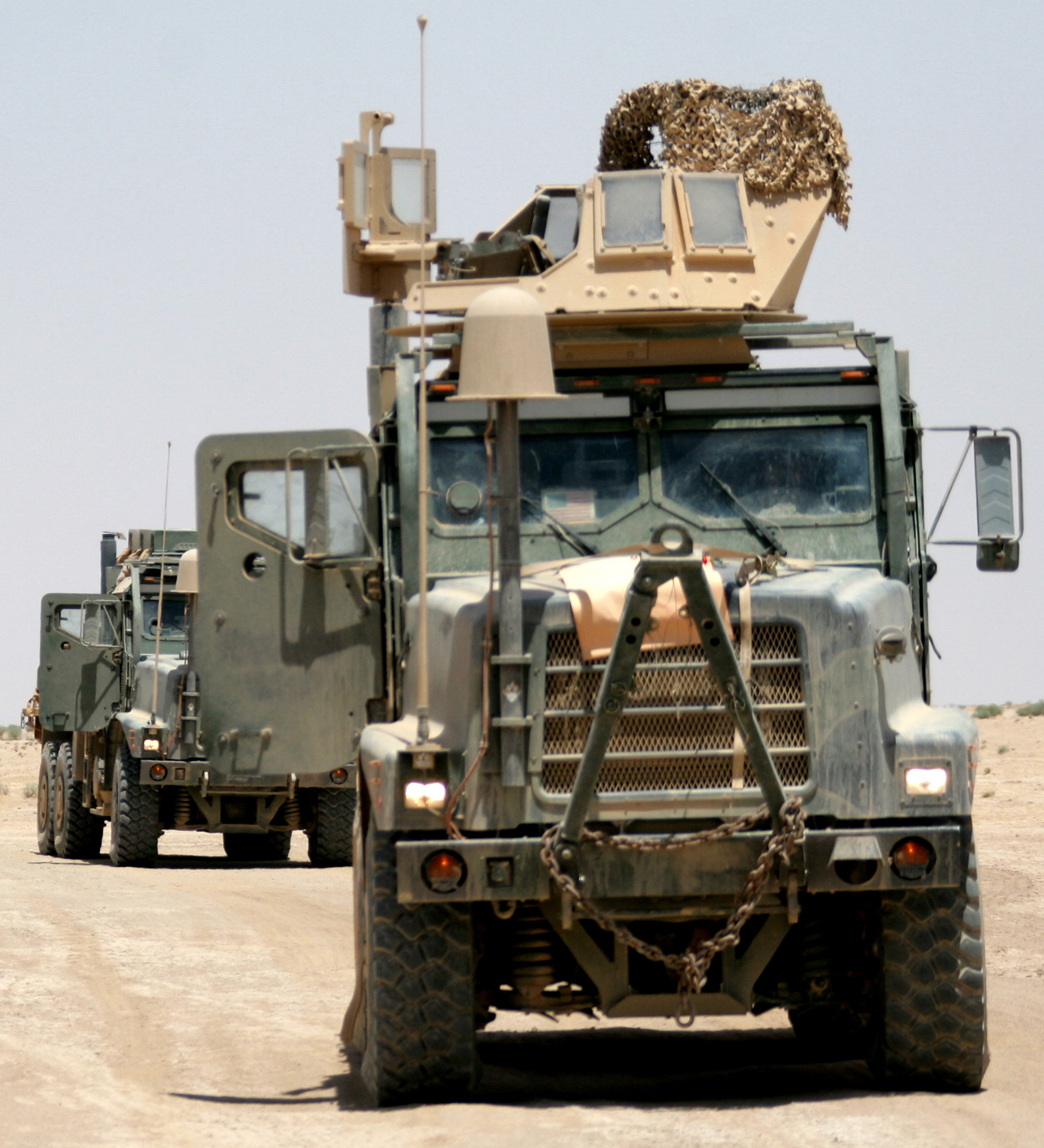
Development of a protection kit for the MTVR commenced in 2003, with the first production contract awarded in 2004

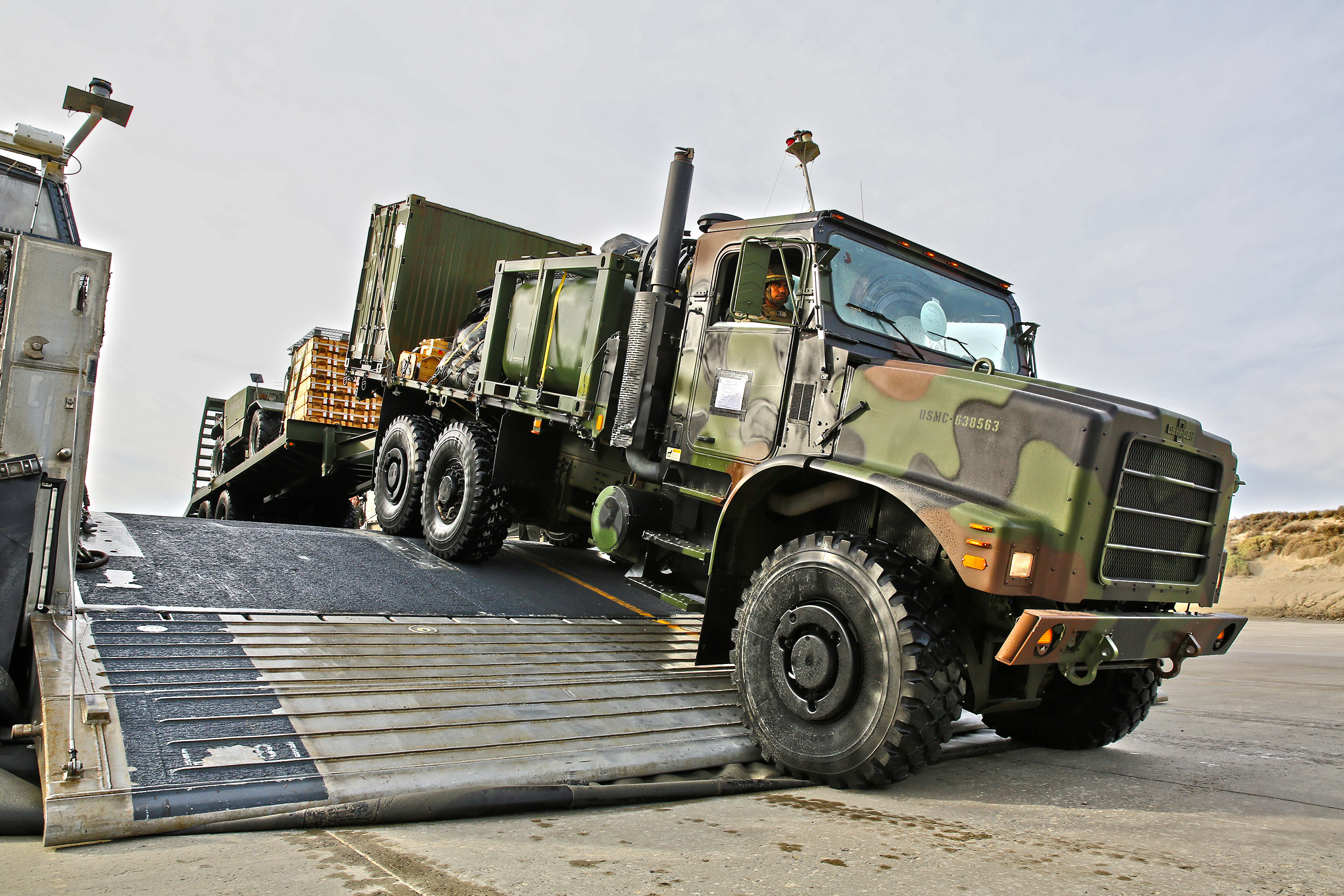
Designation for extended cargo 5.486 m wheelbase MTVRs is MK27 or MK28 (with winch)

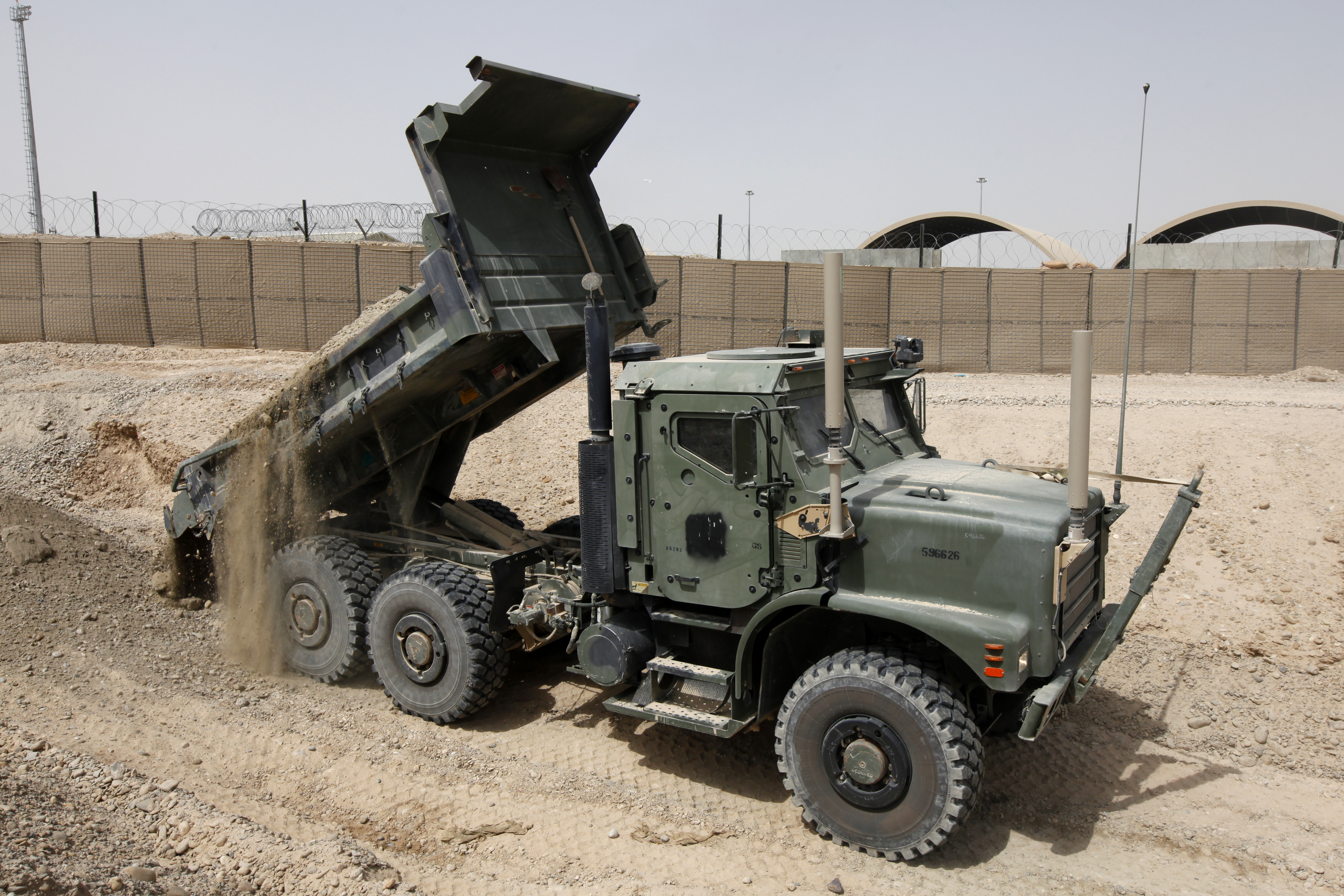
Designation for dump truck MTVRs is MK29 or MK30 (with winch). This MK30 is fitted with an armored cab

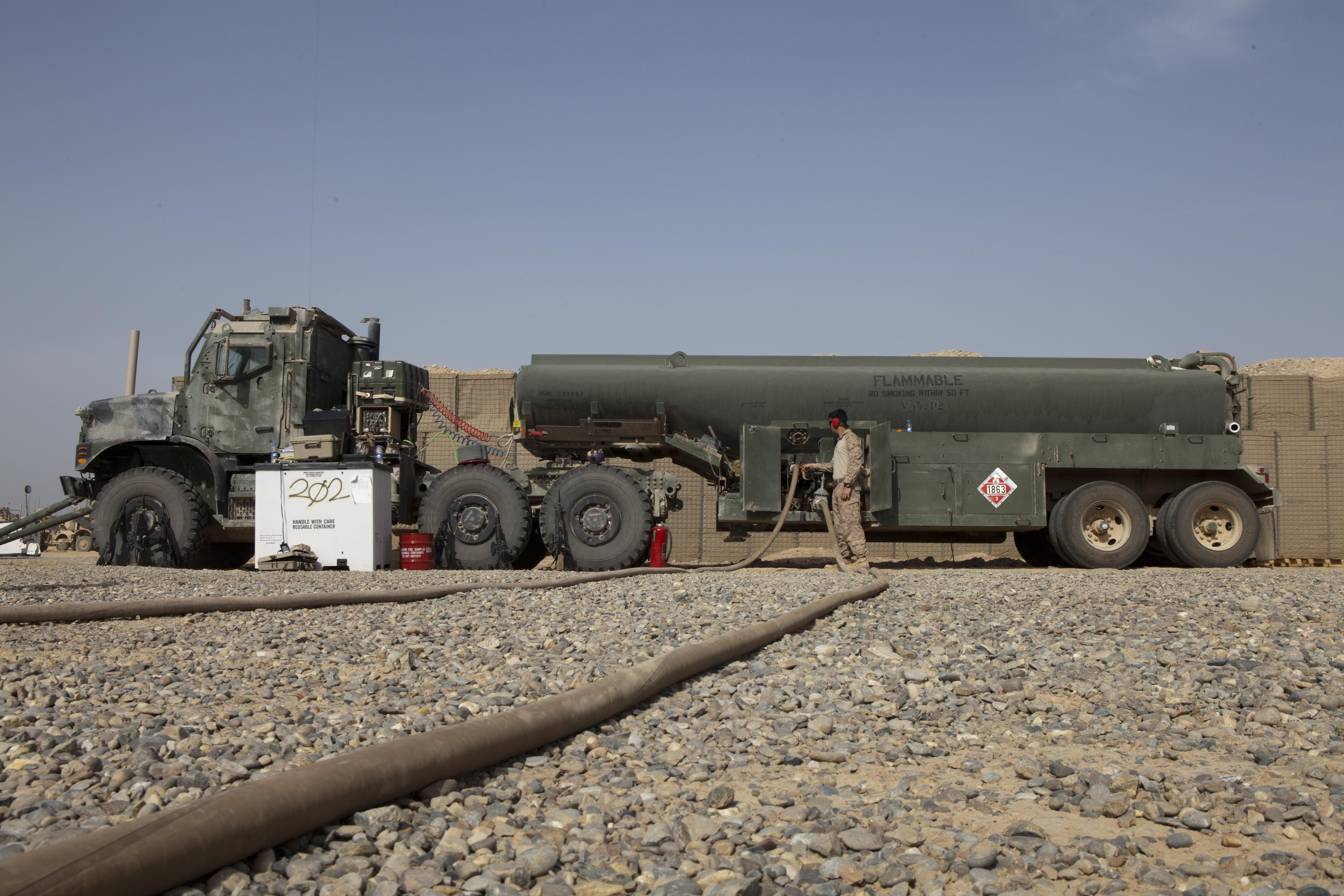
MTVR MK31 tractor with an armored cab

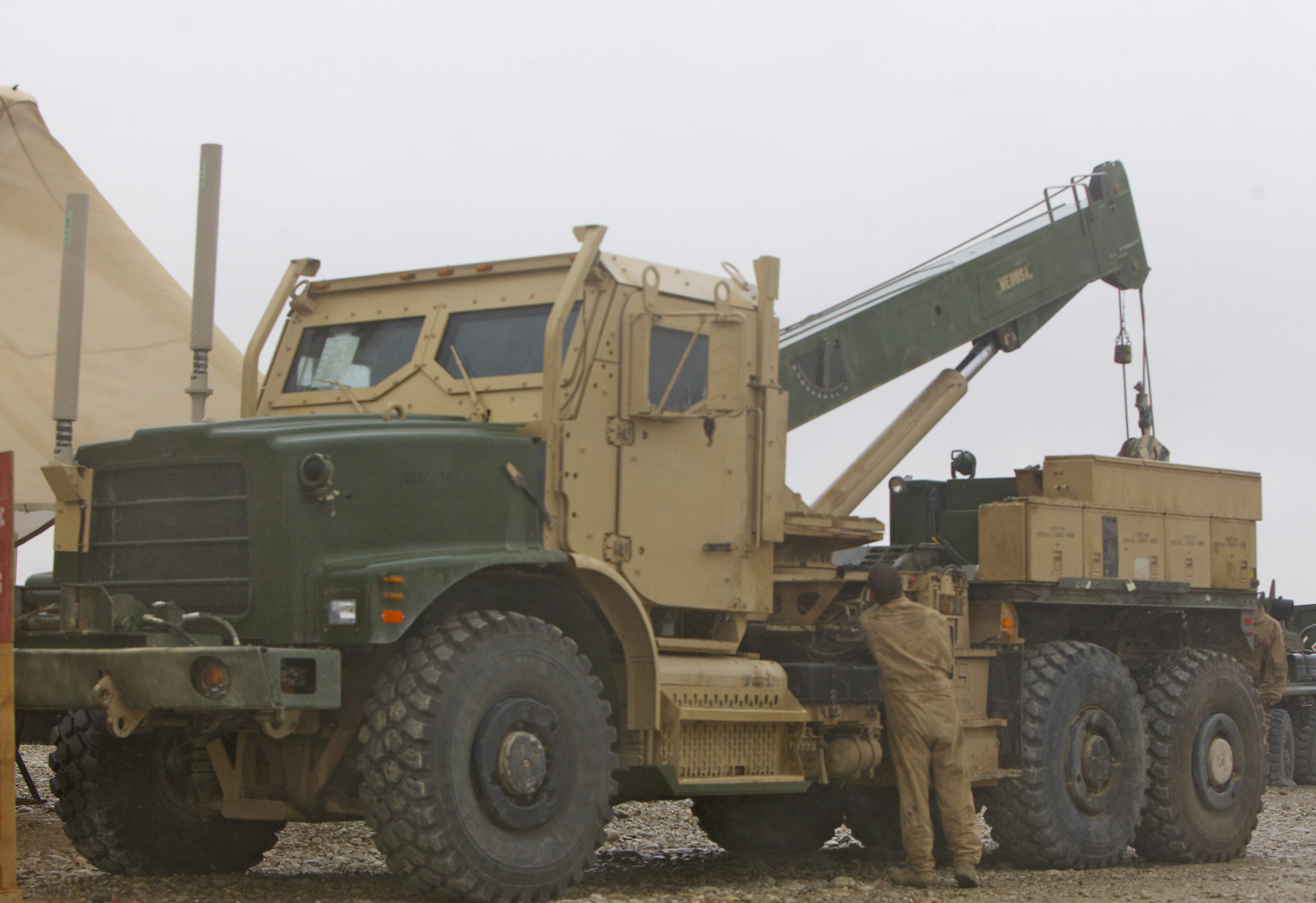
Designation for the wrecker MTVR variant is MK36, this example fitted with an armored cab

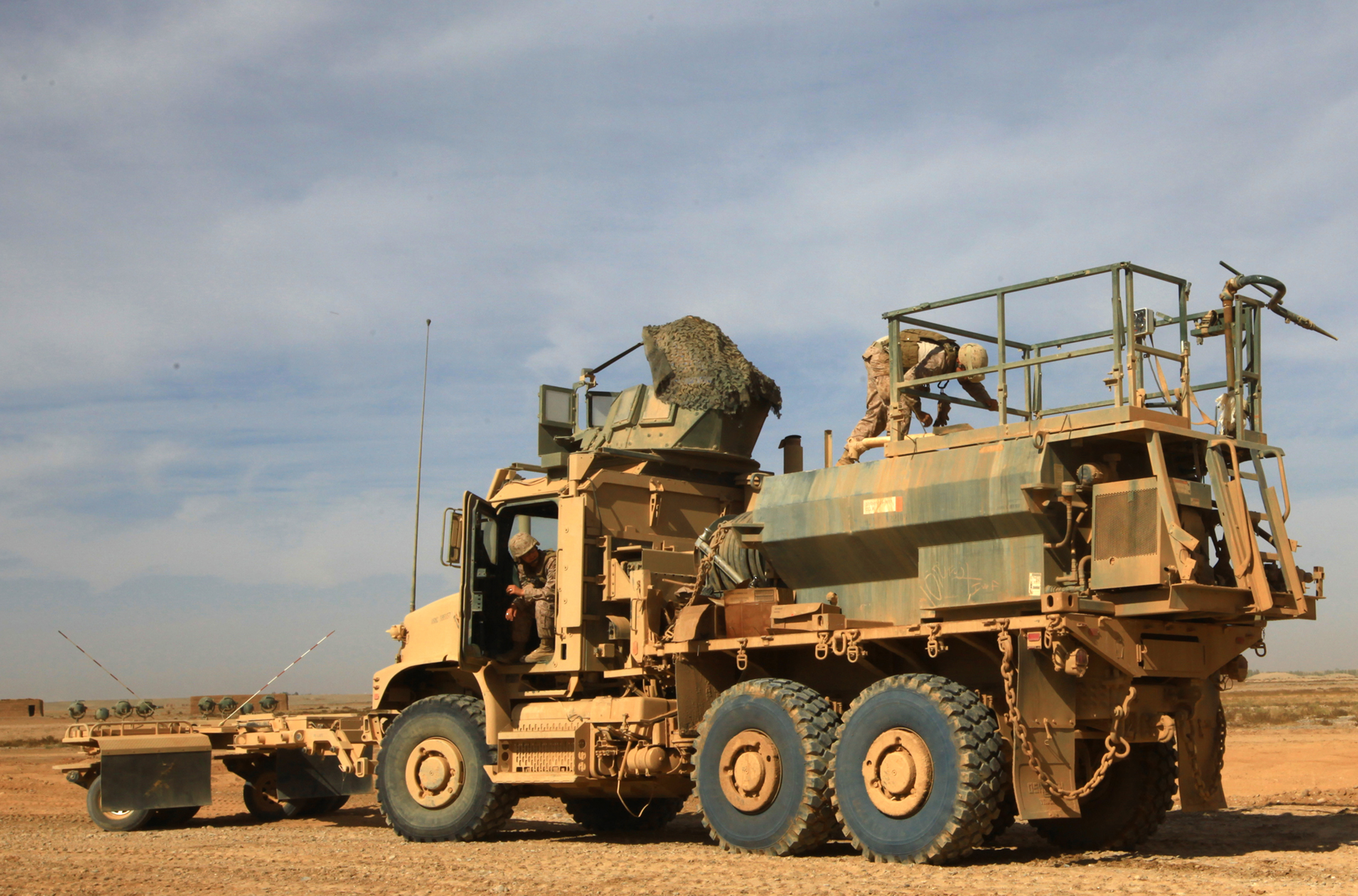
Designation for standard cargo 4.674 m wheelbase MTVRs is MK23 or MK25 (with winch). This example has an armored cab and is equipped with mine rollers

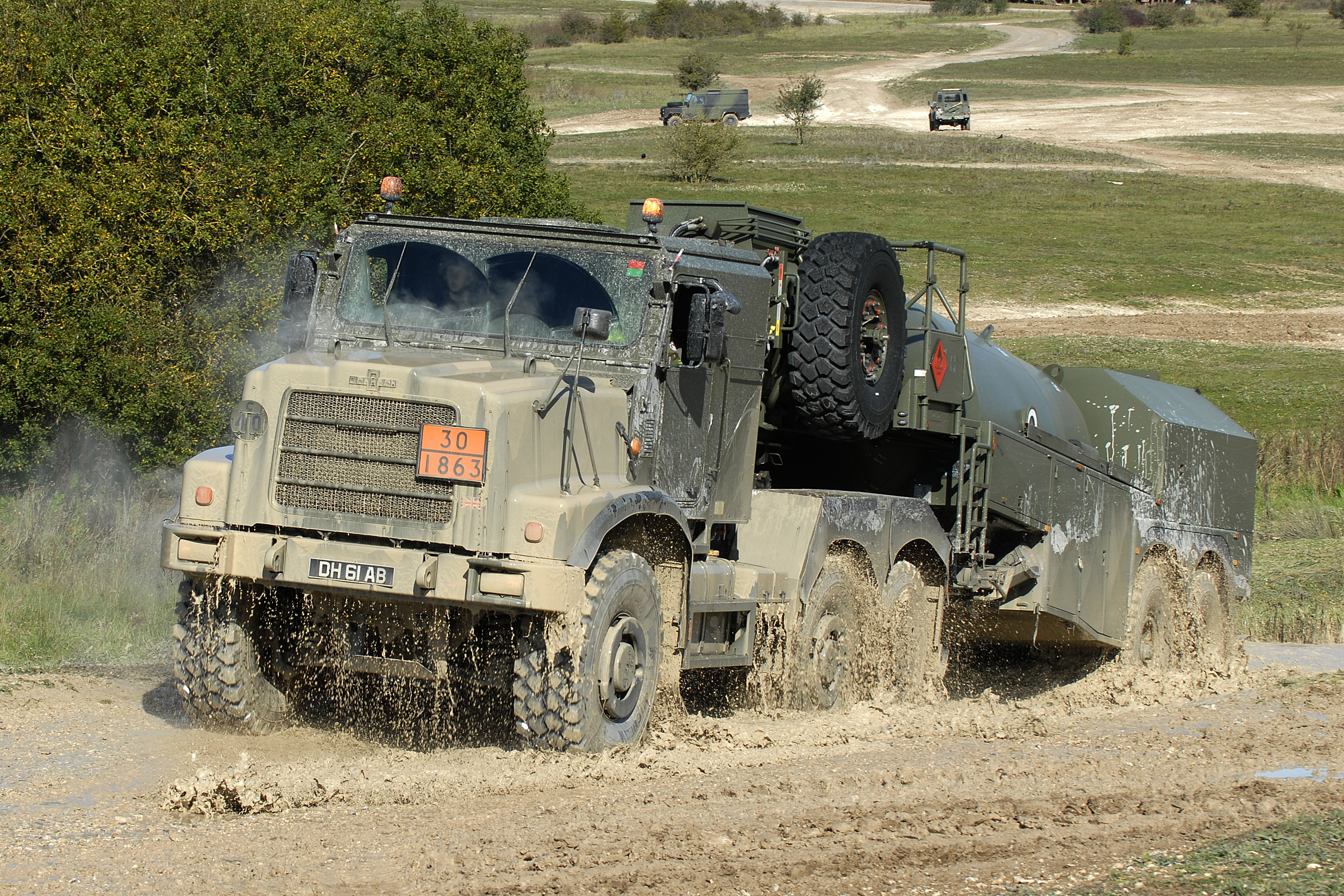
In 2003 the UK became the first export customer for the MTVR, ordering 218 CSTs (fuel); 82 TARs (shown here) and 48 CSTs (water)

== Prototype and developmental MTVRs ==
- Two each of 6×6 and 8×8 prototypes with Hiab load handling systems have been built. The 6×6 chassis are 9/14 ton (8,165/12,701 kg) on-/off-road rated, while the two 8×8 prototypes are rated at 16.5 tons (14,967 kg) and 15,000 kg payload. Both 8×8 chassis are fitted with a tridem rear axle layout, the rear axles (of which axles three and four steer) sprung hydraulically.
- Two 4×4 variants have been developed, the Short Bed Cargo Truck and Lightweight Cargo Truck. The Short Bed Cargo Truck has a high degree of commonality with the 6x6 MTVR, while the Lightweight truck is aimed at the opposite end of the payload/capability scale, this variant being fitted with beam-type axles and a simpler leaf spring (front) and airbag (rear) suspension set-up.
- A four-door crew-cab option is available for longer wheelbase chassis.
- A European-friendly forward control (with the engine mounted behind the cab) variant of the MTVR, designated as Z Series, has been built.
- In July 2005, Oshkosh was awarded a five-month contract from the Office of Naval Research for the first phase of a four-phase project to develop an MTVR with a 60 kW on-board power generating capability.
- Together with a selection of industry partners, Oshkosh has developed the MTVR-based TerraMax, an autonomous vehicle equipped with an extensive array of sensors, cameras and navigational computers.
- The Bull MRAP is based on the MTVR. In October 2007 Ideal Innovations Inc., Oshkosh Truck Corporation, and Ceradyne Inc. announced that they had delivered Category I and Category II MRAP II vehicles to the US Army Aberdeen Test Centre for further service evaluation. Ultimately no orders for any MRAP II vehicles were placed

== Operators and details ==
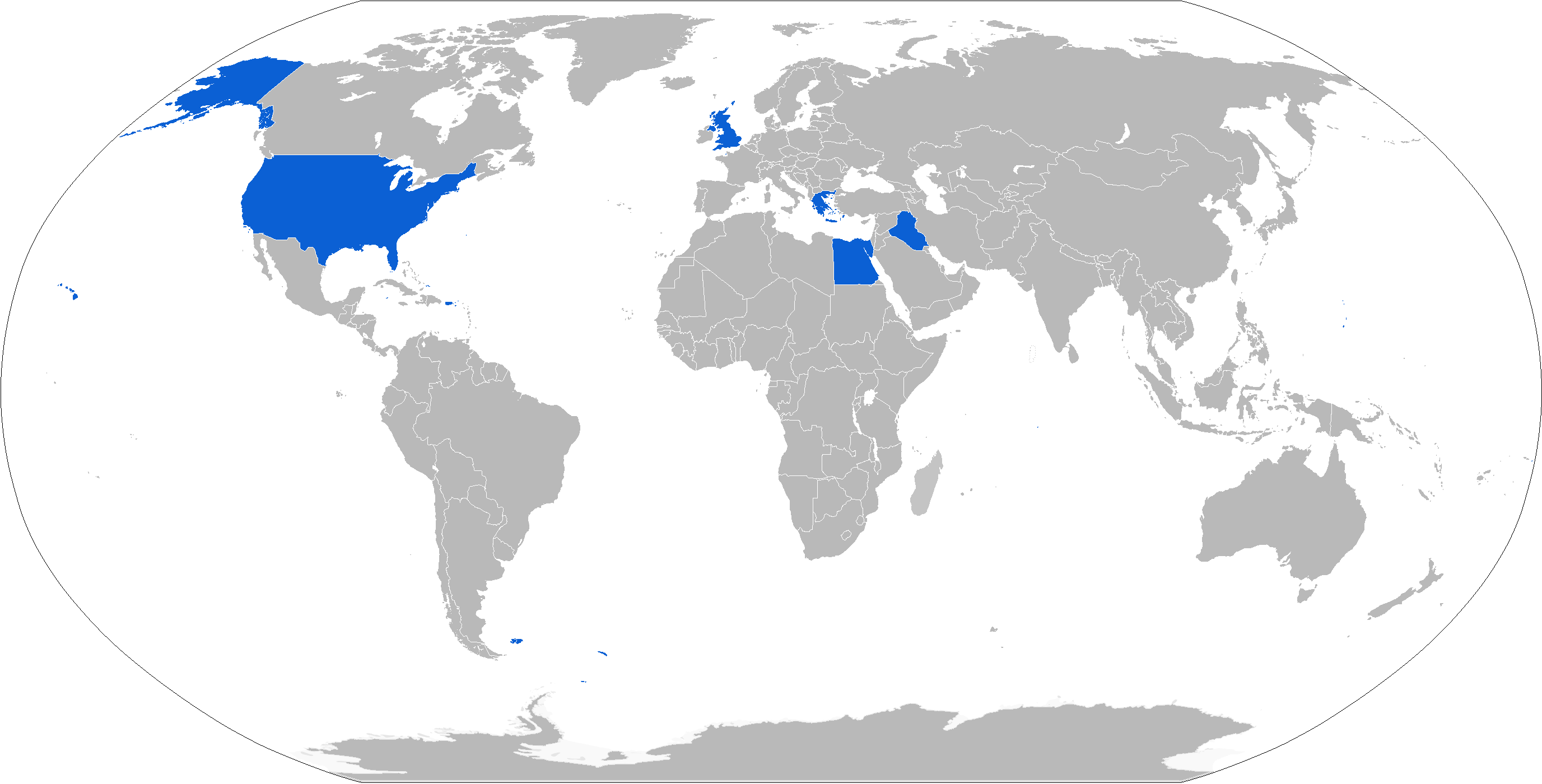
Map with Oshkosh MTVR operators in blue

- Greece - 73: 18 MK27 chassis were delivered to ELBO (Hellenic Vehicle Industry) during 2004. A further 15 MK27 chassis were delivered during 2005, and during October 2006 a further 40 MK27 chassis were delivered. Initial deliveries (2004/2005) are fitted with medium recovery equipment supplied by Eyal of Israel, while the October 2006 delivery are fitted out as ammunition transporter vehicles to operate alongside the Hellenic Army's Leopard MBTs
- Iraq
- United Kingdom - 357: In March 2003 the UK became the first export customer for the MTVR. The Wheeled Tanker contract is valued at approximately £160 million (US$250 million) for initial vehicle acquisition and support over 15 years. The contract called for 218 Close Support Tankers (CSTs) (fuel); 82 Tactical Aircraft Refuellers (TARs) and 48 CSTs (water); a contract option for an additional nine CST (water) has been exercised
- United States - 11,359 delivered to the United States Marine Corps and US Navy Seabees. (Note: Contract details in main article.)

=== Former operators ===
- Islamic State - 10 vehicles were seized by ISIL. 3 vehicles were captured from Iraqi Forces and paraded through Mosul during the aftermath of Mosul's fall in June 2014. 3 others were also paraded at an unknown location and date. 1 was turned into a VBIED and triggered at an unknown location and date. 3 were captured and paraded through Raqqa during the aftermath of the Raqqa campaign (2012–2013).

== See also ==
- Family of Medium Tactical Vehicles - equivalent truck in U.S. Army service
- M939 series trucks - previous U.S. Marines 5-ton truck; replaced by MTVR
- M809 series trucks previous U.S. Marines 5-ton truck; replaced by MTVR (remained in use alongside successor M939 series)
- M35 series trucks - previous U.S. Army/Marines 2.5-ton truck
- Logistics Vehicle System (LVS) - U.S. Marines heavy truck; replaced by Oshkosh LVSR
- Oshkosh Logistic Vehicle System Replacement (LVSR) - replaced LVS
- Heavy Expanded Mobility Tactical Truck - U.S. Army heavy truck
- Palletized Load System
- Leyland 4-tonne truck - British Army truck used for similar roles; replaced by RMMV HX range
- RMMV HX range of trucks
- Navistar 7000 series - based on International Workstar chassis
- Oshkosh M-ATV
