= Bull (armored personnel carrier) =

Armored personnel carrier

External image
- Bull APC

The Bull is an armored personnel carrier with a v-shaped hull designed in a combined effort between Ceradyne, Ideal Innovations Inc. (I-3), and Oshkosh Corporation in response to the MRAP II competition. "The Bull" is a trade-mark of Ideal Innovations, Inc. (I-3).

The MRAP II competition was announced in 2007 when it became clear that explosively formed penetrator (EFP) type of roadside bomb attacks were increasing in Iraq and the current generation MRAP vehicles could not stop all of them without add-on armor kits. In 2005 Ideal Innovations' President, Robert Kocher, had worked with the U.S. Army Research Laboratory to find an EFP solution, patented it, and then found Ceradyne as a partner in 2006 to produce an armored cab out of it. The U.S. Army's Joint Manufacturing and Technology Center at the Rock Island Arsenal provides the EFP-stopping outer layers of the armor. Kocher had previously been involved in the 1991-93 development of the up-armored Humvee and was part of the team that developed the boron carbide armor now used in Interceptor body armor vests that Ceradyne produces.

In 2007 Oshkosh was selected to provide its Medium Tactical Vehicle Replacement (MTVR) chassis, with their TAK-4 independent suspension system and Commercial Off the Shelf (COTS) computer hardware, for the vehicles I3 and Ceradyne intended to enter in the MRAP II competition. Two prototypes were made within 50 days. Team Bull members at Ceradyne, together with almost three dozen employees from I3 and Oshkosh, immediately began working round-the-clock shifts. Engineers rarely left the site, with team members instead grabbing a couple of hours of sleep outside in their cars for refreshment. A six-person version and a ten-person version were delivered to the Aberdeen Proving Grounds for testing.

The EFP simulations were so successful that the military quickly adapted the armor into the Frag kit 6 armor upgrade kits for the Humvee and other MRAP vehicles. Senators Carl Levin (D-Mich) and Joseph Biden (D-Del) took up Bull’s cause. Levin wrote a letter to Defense Secretary Gates promoting the vehicle and Biden asked, during a Senate Foreign Relations Committee event, why the military hadn’t ordered the vehicle. After testing the initial two prototypes, the military awarded the partnership a $18.1 million contract to produce six more Bull vehicles of the six person variant by the first quarter of 2008 for further evaluation. While eight vehicles entered the MRAP II competition, The Bull was one of only two vehicles to receive a contract from it. The other was an uparmored BAE Caiman.

It has been reported that the complete vehicle weighs around 40,000 lbs and costs about $500,000 (three times more than a Humvee). The Bull prototypes had two side hatches at the front (meeting MRAP II specs), used mainly for emergency exits. This design gave more side protection than larger traditional doors. The Bull had no gun ports, but these could be added in the final production model.
