= MRAP Armor Weight Reduction Spiral Program =

U.S. Army Research Laboratory (ARL) research on MRAP Armor Weight Reduction Spiral (MAWRS) program resulted in armor technologies 40 percent lighter, with technologies fielded on more than 10,000 MRAP vehicles. Dozens of spin-out designs were provided to most major combat and tactical wheeled-vehicles program in production.

== Purpose and plan ==
ARL monitored escalation in the lethality of threats encountered by forces deployed in Southwest Asia. For better and lighter protection from improvised explosive devices (IEDs), ARL developed weight reduction goals and started to explore practical technology options by the end of FY08.

A partnership was formed between Research, Development and Engineering Command (RDECOM) and the MRAP Joint Program Office (JPO) that resulted in RDECOM accelerating the development of IED protective technology and JPO redirecting its set of original equipment manufacturers to add vehicle payload capacity. The overall requirement was that the introduction of armor production could not delay the deployment schedule of MRAP equipment to theater.

The program's combined technical approach was to exploit computing and terminal effects experimentation to scale known technologies for the defeat of IED threats; understand the most viable armor mechanisms for efficient penetrator defeat; and then introduce light-weight composites, new materials and enhanced ballistic mechanisms to reduce the add-on weight of final armor packages.

The technical challenge to RDECOM was that technology originally envisioned as high-risk for a one-year developmental program, was now required to be production-ready within five months. The MAWRS program generated dozens of armor designs to counter explosively formed penetrator threats, improving protection for a variety of ground systems.

== Results ==
Improvements include the Stryker family of vehicles. Using ARL's Defense Supercomputing Resource Center for supercomputing, materials research, on-site fabrication and live fire exercises at experimental facilities, expedient crew protection solutions for the Stryker were developed using advanced armor materials and improvements in energy absorption for crew seating. These technologies were transitioned to General Dynamics Land Systems for kit production and fielding.

The MAWRS program was recognized by United States Army Materiel Command as the “Top Ten Great Inventions of 2008.”
