= Ceradyne =

Manufacturer of advanced ceramic systems

Ceradyne Inc.
- Type: Public
- Industry: Industrial Equipment & Components
- Founded: 1967
- Headquarters: 3M headquarters, St. Paul, Minnesota, United States
- Area served: Worldwide
- Divisions: Advanced Ceramic Operations; Ceradyne Armor Systems, Inc. Ceradyne Boron Products LLC; Ceradyne Canada ULC; ESK Ceramics; Minco, Inc. Thermo Materials; Tianjin Technical Ceramics; SemEquip, Inc. Semicon Associates; Vehicle Armor Systems
- Website: www.ceradyne.com

Ceradyne, Incorporated is a wholly owned subsidiary of the British company, Avon Rubber. Ceradyne, Inc. is a manufacturer of advanced ceramic systems and components and involved in many technical industries including nuclear power, oil and gas, solar energy, automotive, and defense. In November 2012, thousands of ballistic armor plates manufactured by the company for United States Special Operations troops were recalled due to safety defects.

== Background ==
Ceradyne was founded in 1967 and in late 2004, the company added new product lines by acquiring ESK Ceramics of Kempten, Germany.

In addition to producing ceramic components for industrial processes such as silicon foundries and ceramic fuel pellets for nuclear reactors, Ceradyne researched and produced varieties of ballistic armour for both personnel and vehicles. The ceramic armor was lighter than regular steel plate armor facilitating greater mobility. On September 16, 2007, the company was selling 25,000 sets of armor a month to the Pentagon.

In December 2007, Ceradyne's lightweight armor was approved by the Army for use on military vehicles. Oshkosh Truck produced the first of these armored vehicles using the armor on HEMETT crew cabs. Ceradyne was also the producer of ceramic Enhanced Small Arms Protective Inserts (E-SAPI) for the US Army's Interceptor body armor, and the blast-proof components of the Ceradyne BULL MRAP/MMPV vehicle project.

In January 2008, the company also received an order for $9.6 million worth of body armor from UNICOR (Federal Prison Industries Inc.), which provided jobs and job training to inmates in US federal prisons.

On November 28, 2012, Ceradyne, Inc. was fully acquired by 3M becoming a wholly owned subsidiary of 3M.

On January 2, 2020, Ceradyne, Inc.'s advanced ballistic protection business and the Ceradyne brand were acquired by Avon Rubber.

== Product recall ==
In November 2012 thousands of SPEAR Generation III ballistic armor plates manufactured by Ceradyne for issue to United States Special Operations troops were recalled due to "safety defects". An analysis by the Department of Defense discovered the flawed plates. Defects were identified in less than five percent of plates tested according to United States Special Operations Command (USSOCOM). USSOCOM says "No one has been killed or wounded as a result of the defective body armor".

== IMP/ACT ==
The following table displays the capabilities of Ceradyne's IMP/ACT (Improved Multihit Protection/Advanced Composite Technology) series of plates. IMP/ACT plates use a stainless steel crack arrestor embedded between the strike face and backer to contain cracking to the immediate site of a bullet impact; the newest GOST 6A-rated GRANIT (ГРАНИТ) plates currently in service with the Russian Armed Forces use a similar crack arrestor made of titanium. This table is intended to exemplify the performance improvements that can be attained through the use of a crack arrestor, which enables a monolithic plate to match the multi-hit performance of non-monolithic models at a significantly lower weight.

Bullet	Bullet Construction	Mass^{Note 1}	Velocity	Plate Weight	Multi-hit Spacing	Hits Per Plate (typical)
5.56×45mm M193	Ball, lead core	55-grain (3.6 g)	3,300-foot-per-second (1,000 m/s)	3.7-pound (1.7 kg)	1–2-inch (2.5–5.1 cm)	12
5.56×45mm M855/SS109	Ball, steel tip, lead core	61-grain (4.0 g)	3,300-foot-per-second (1,000 m/s)	3.7-pound (1.7 kg)	1–2-inch (2.5–5.1 cm)	12
5.56×45mm M995	AP, tungsten carbide core	52-grain (3.4 g)	3,280-foot-per-second (1,000 m/s)	3.9-pound (1.8 kg)	2–3-inch (5.1–7.6 cm)	8
7.62×39mm PS	Ball, steel core	122-grain (7.9 g)	2,400-foot-per-second (730 m/s)	3.7-pound (1.7 kg)	3–4-inch (7.6–10.2 cm)	8
7.62×54mmR LPS	Ball, steel core	148-grain (9.6 g)	2,800-foot-per-second (850 m/s)	4.2-pound (1.9 kg)	3–4-inch (7.6–10.2 cm)	6
7.62×39mm BZ	API (armor-piercing incendiary), steel core	119-grain (7.7 g)	2,400-foot-per-second (730 m/s)	4.2-pound (1.9 kg)	3–4-inch (7.6–10.2 cm)	6
7.62×51mm M80	Ball, lead core	149-grain (9.7 g)	2,850-foot-per-second (870 m/s)	3.7-pound (1.7 kg)	4–5-inch (10–13 cm)	6
7.62×51mm M61	AP, steel core	151-grain (9.8 g)	2,850-foot-per-second (870 m/s)	4.9-pound (2.2 kg)	3–4-inch (7.6–10.2 cm)	4
.30-06 Springfield M2 AP	AP, steel core	166-grain (10.8 g)	2,850-foot-per-second (870 m/s)	5.2-pound (2.4 kg)	3–4-inch (7.6–10.2 cm)	3
7.62×51mm M993	AP, tungsten carbide core	127-grain (8.2 g)	3,120-foot-per-second (950 m/s)	5.8-pound (2.6 kg)	5–6-inch (13–15 cm)	3

Note 1: 0.8-square-foot (0.074 m^{2}) size medium, triple curve, complete armor plate weight (including spall cover) required to protect against threat at stated multi-hit spacing when used in conjunction with NIJ IIIA soft armor vest.
