= Frag Kit 6 =

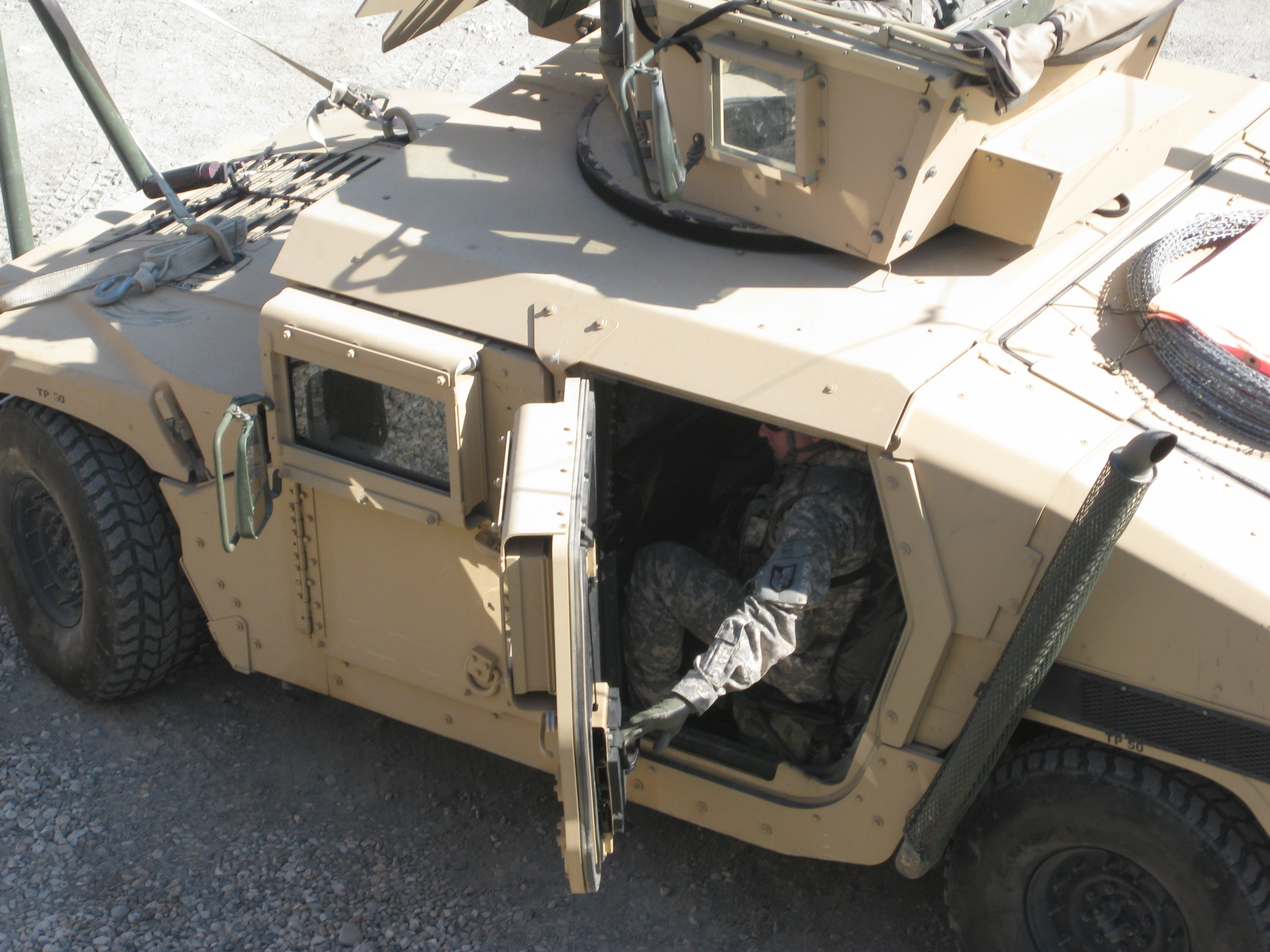
Armored Humvee

Frag Kit 6 is a vehicular armor upgrade kit developed by the U.S. Army Research Laboratory to defeat explosively formed projectiles (EFP), a type of armor penetrator often utilized in improvised explosive devices (IED). It is designed to be added on armored vehicles such as the MRAP and unarmored Humvee. Like the Chobham armor, the exact materials and the way it works is classified information.

Frag Kit 6 adds about 1,000 lb (450 kg) of extra weight (100 lb per sq ft) and 12 inches (300 mm) of width on each side of the vehicle (2 feet overall) over the previous Frag Kit 5 Humvee armor. The doors are so heavy, troops may need a mechanical assist device to open and close them and so wide drivers may require built-in visual references so they will know if they can fit the vehicle in narrow spaces. Frag Kit 6 armor also makes MRAP vehicles too wide to legally operate on U.S. highways.

Frag Kit 6 technology is integrated into MRAP II vehicles. The purpose behind the MRAP II competition was to field vehicles that don't need the kit added on. Frag Kit 6 looks similar to the armored plates used on the British "Mastiff" version of the Force Protection Cougar. It appears to be used extensively on Navistar's MaxxPro Plus vehicle.
