= G7 howitzer =

Towed howitzer

G7 105 mm howitzer
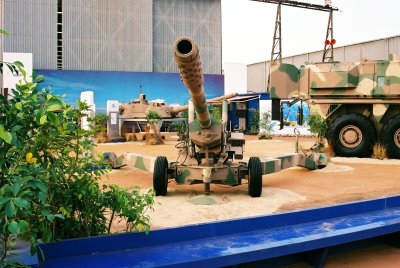
- G7 105 mm howitzer
- Type: Towed howitzer
- Place of origin: South Africa

Production history
- Designer: Denel Land Systems
- Designed: 1995–1997
- Manufacturer: Denel Land Systems

Specifications
- Mass: 3,800 kg (8,400 lb)
- Length: Travel: 6.9 m (22 ft 8 in)
- Barrel length: 5.46 m (17 ft 11 in) L/52 (excluding muzzle brake)
- Width: Travel: 2.02 m (6 ft 8 in)
- Height: Travel: 2.1 m (6 ft 11 in)
- Crew: 5
- Caliber: 105 mm (4.1 in)
- Breech: Semi-automatic swing and slide type
- Recoil: Gas based with 1 m (3 ft 3 in) travel
- Carriage: Split trail
- Elevation: -5° to +75°
- Traverse: 40°
- Rate of fire: 6 rpm
- Muzzle velocity: Maximum: 950 m/s (3,100 ft/s)
- Maximum firing range: 32 km (20 mi) with base bleed projectile
- Sights: Telescopic sight for direct fire and panoramic sight for indirect fire

The G7 is a South African 105 mm howitzer, produced by Denel Land Systems (DLS). With a maximum range of 32 km (20 mi) it outranges all existing 105 mm howitzers, as well as most current 155 mm howitzers (Denel's own 155 not included). During development, it was known as the Light Experimental Ordnance (LEO), with the G7 label being chosen later to fit in with Denel's two existing howitzer products, the G5 towed 155 mm howitzer and the G6 self-propelled 155 mm howitzer.

== Potential customers ==
In 2004, DLS partnered with General Dynamics Land Systems (GDLS) to offer the gun in self-propelled form to the United States Army. GDLS provided an armoured vehicle (the LAV III), while Denel provided a G7 mounted inside a specially designed, unmanned turret. The combined system weighs only 17,500 kg (38,600 lb) when fully loaded with ammunition, making it light enough to be transportable inside a C-130 Hercules transport aircraft. The combination took part in a number of tests for the US Army. Though currently unfunded, the US Army has indicated a requirement for such a system to equip its Stryker Brigade. The Strykers cannot use current self-propelled and towed howitzers as their weight is a limiting factor on the brigade's mobility.

Interest in the system has also been exhibited by the militaries of South Africa, Canada, the United Kingdom and Australia. In addition, the United States Army (USA) and United States Marine Corps (USMC) have exhibited interest in the towed version as a possible replacement for their towed 105 mm howitzer stocks.

In parallel with the G7's testing on the LAV-III Denel is also planning to fit it and its turret to a Rooikat armoured vehicle for its offer to the South African Army.

== AMLAGC ==
In April 2007, it was reported that Armscor, the South African defence procurements agency, was about to award Denel a contract to develop a more advanced version of the G7, to be dubbed the Advanced Multirole Light Artillery Gun Capability (AMLAGC). Under the proposed contract, the G7 would see a "significant increase" in capability, including a weight reduction to 2,500 kg (5,500 lb) or less and the development of V-LAP ammunition to boost the range to 36 km (22 mi).

== See also ==
- List of artillery
