= Musgrave (firearms) =

South African firearm manufacturer

Musgrave is a brand of firearms from South Africa. They are noted for their bolt-action target and hunting rifles, in particular the Musgrave RSA Target Rifle.

Musgrave was started in 1950 by Ben Musgrave and his sons, restocking and accurizing surplus service rifles before developing their own line of hunting and target rifles. The company was acquired by ARMSCOR in 1971 and later moved under Denel Land Systems. The brand disappeared in 1996 and the Bloemfontein facility closed.

The name was revived in 2009 after it was acquired by a private owner, with production based at a new facility in Ermelo (Gert Sibande).

== History ==
Ben Musgrave (senior) began target shooting in 1933. At the time, all target shooting was conducted with contemporary service rifles such as the Lee–Enfield, Lee–Metford and P14. After experimenting with the accuracy of his rifle, he came to be in demand from other shooters to accurize and re-barrel their rifles. In 1950 he founded Musgrave with eldest son Trevor.

In 1952 Ben was awarded Springbok colours and selected to travel with the South African team to the NRA Imperial Meeting at Bisley in England. Whilst there he was introduced to barrel manufacturer W.D. Lain who was nearing retirement. Lain agreed to train Trevor in barrel making, with the intention of then selling his rifling machine and tooling to Musgrave. Trevor duly completed his training and the equipment arrived in Bloemfontein in 1953 when younger brother Ben Musgrave (junior) joined the firm aged 14. Ben Jr would go on to be regarded as a genius barrel maker. All three Musgraves earned full Springbok colours for rifle shooting.

Concerned with growing industrial isolation due to apartheid sanctions, ARMSCOR approached Musgrave in 1969 with a view to developing a production hunting rifle. Musgrave became a subsidiary of Armscor in 1971. Production hunting rifles became available in 1972. 1971 also saw the Musgrave RSA target rifle debut at the National Championships at Cape Town where it broke multiple records. Ben Jnr was proclaimed "Shooting Hero" after setting a record score of 294/300 - the highest score shot in Bisley matches in any Commonwealth country. Some countries would ban the Musgrave from competition as being "too accurate", with accurized service rifles unable to compete. Such bans were generally short-lived as other purpose-built target rifles such as the British Swing were also coming to market.

In 1972, work started on a new purpose built factory in Bloemfontain, which developed into a giant gunsmithing concern. RSA actions and earlier hammer-forged barrels were manufactured at Lyttelton Engineering Works. By 1989, Musgrave employed 220 people and produced 6,000 hunting rifles per year over a ten model range. Musgrave's product range diversified to include shotguns, sporting equipment, fuel locking devices and other items.

In 1992, Musgrave was one of the businesses moved from ARMSCOR into the new Denel conglomerate. Denel abandoned the name in August 1996 when Musgrave's Bloemfontein facility was closed down. Some of the equipment and personnel relocated to Lyttelton Engineering Works (new Denel Land Systems) where hunting rifles were built under the "Vektor" (Vector) name for a short while, alongside the R4 assault rifle, Z88 pistol and other small armaments which form Denel's main focus.

In 2009, the dormant Musgrave name was acquired by a private owner, Frikkie du Plooy. Manufacturing started at a new facility in Ermelo, Mpumalanga. The revived firm builds new semi-custom hunting rifles as well as an AR-15 variant - the Musgrave AR.

== The Musgrave RSA Target Rifle ==
The single-shot Musgrave RSA action (sometimes marked "Lyttelton RSA") is based on Mauser's design and features a controlled feed (claw) extractor. The actions have a large flat bedding area underneath and a short case extraction port. The original Musgrave target rifles were fitted with 26.5" barrels and designated "7,62" (7.62×51mm NATO or .308 Winchester).

The top part of the fitted hammer forged barrels (until c. 1975) from Lyttleton, were encased by a handguard, while M&S 1/3 MOA rear sights were installed. Parker Hale 1/4 MOA rear sights were available as an option. Stocks were made of a dense and strong beech wood. The handguard is absent from later models, which had significantly bulkier fore-ends to allow for an open barrel with effective cooling while still reducing potential fliers due to contact between the free floated barrel and the shooter's fingers. Accurate Musgrave-manufactured button rifled barrels (with a slightly longer, parallel nox) were usually matched with these stocks.

Musgraves were proofed by a recognised Proof-House. The SABS (South African Bureau of Standards) stamped the metalwork on a proofed rifle with two proofmarks in the shape of a capital letter "T" within "Springbok horns", one on the action (receiver), the other on the barrel.

A SABS inspector fired a high pressure round through every rifle manufactured on Musgrave's site and signed off. Musgrave's quality control department did a rigorous functional test on every rifle, testing the trigger, safety catch, firing pin protrusion, extractor and headspace against strict standards while evaluating the rifle's accuracy.

The South African Bisley Union site states:

"With the advent of the new RSA rifle and thanks to better sporting-type rifles in general, which were used for the first time in South Africa during the 1971 National Championships at Cape Town, record totals began tumbling headlong. In 1972 South Africa, shooting in Salisbury, shattered the spectacular Rhodes Centenary Match record of 1845 points by a staggering 81 points."

== Musgrave hunting rifles ==
Surplus rifle conversions

Many .303 rifles were available in South Africa after the 2nd Anglo-Boer war, and conversions of these were used as hunting rifles. For plains game, a flatter shooting alternative was found in 6 mm Musgrave.

Production Rifles

Features highlighted below as characteristics of the various models are not exclusive, as many variants exist.

Three models of Musgrave hunting rifles for which the RSA action served as platform were manufactured from 29 May 1970, namely the

- "Veld Model"
- "Vrystaat Model" (Mk I)
- "Presidents Model" (Mk II)

Several other models followed, including:

- Mk III & Mk IV (Mod 98 based Santa Barbara actions and barrels - Serial numbers start with "R-")
- LP 1000s
- Mod 80
- Mod 83
- K98
- Various Mod 90s
- Mod 2000
- Afrika (Standard, De Lux and Supreme)

Musgrave built three exhibition rifles by hand for display in the USA (1983-1984) with the following serial numbers: XMA001 – Supreme Grade XMA002 – Custom Grade XMA003 – Standard Grade These were polished Mod 90 actions, engraved by Armin Winkler with gold triggers on French walnut stocks, fore ends tipped with buffalo horn and fitted with express sights. Two additional front sights (drop compensated) came in a hidden compartment in the pistol grip.

.22 Rimfire

- Ambidex (Straight-pull action with bolt handle which can be reassembled to accommodate left-handed shooters)

Some Musgraves were exported to Europe and the US, either as complete rifles or components.

== Shotguns ==
- Over and under: Some Beretta components used - similar to the Beretta 686 O/U shotguns.
- Pump Action: Musgrave 12, similar to the Beretta RS 200, also a version for the South African Police Force.
- Semi-Auto: Essentially a Musgrave-barrelled Beretta A300.

== Musgrave pistols ==
Pistols built by Musgrave include:

- Varan PMX-80
- Musgrave Pistol

== Semi-automatic rifles ==
- LM4
- Musgrave .223 AR15
