= Vektor R4 =

R4 rifle
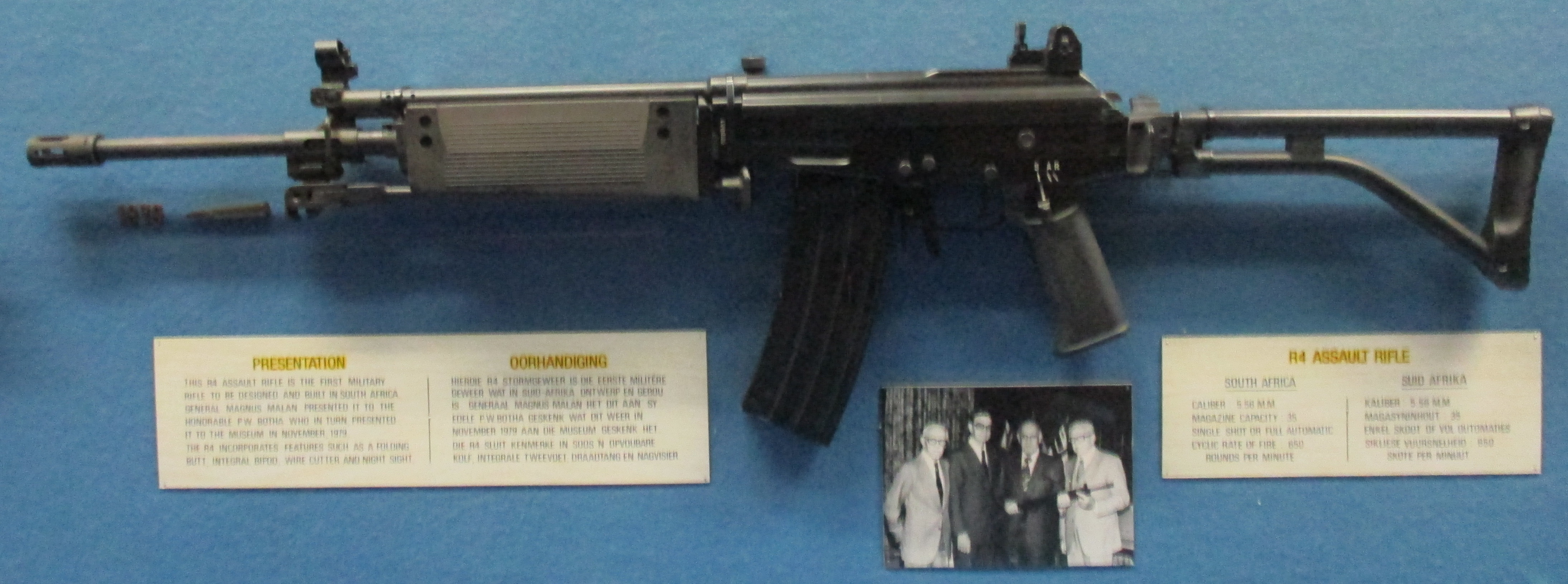
- The first Vektor R4 produced, shown above at the South African National Museum of Military History
- Type: Assault rifle
- Place of origin: South Africa

Service history
- In service: 1980–present
- Used by: See Users
- Wars: South African Border War; Rwandan Civil War; Bophuthatswana crisis; Burundian Civil War; Republic of the Congo Civil War (1997–99); Kivu conflict; Central African Republic conflict; Insurgency in Cabo Delgado; Banjska attack

Production history
- Designer: Yisrael Galili of Israel Military Industries (Note: Minor adaptions were made to the original Israeli Galil design by Lyttelton Engineering Works.)
- Designed: Late 1970's early 1980's
- Manufacturer: Lyttelton Engineering Works, now Denel Land Systems
- No. built: 420,000
- Variants: R5, R6, LM4, LM5, LM6

Specifications
- Mass: 4.3 kg (9.48 lb)
- Length: 877 mm (34.5 in) with stock extended
- Barrel length: 460 mm (18 in)
- Width: 60mm (2.4 inches), 90mm with folded stock
- Height: 260mm (10.2 inches)
- Cartridge: 5.56×45mm NATO
- Action: Gas-operated (rotating bolt)
- Rate of fire: 600-750 rounds/min
- Muzzle velocity: 980 m/s (3,200 ft/s)
- Effective firing range: 500 m (550 yd)
- Feed system: 35-round detachable magazine
- Sights: Flip up aperture rear sight graduated for 300 and 500 meters

The Vektor R4 is a South African 5.56×45mm assault rifle based on the IMI Galil.

== History ==
It entered service as the standard service rifle of the South African Defence Force (SADF) in 1980.

In South African service, the R4 replaced the R1, a variant of the 7.62×51mm FN FAL.

It was produced by Lyttelton Engineering Works (LIW, "Lyttelton Ingenieurswerke"), now Denel Land Systems.

== Design details ==
The weapon is a licensed variant of the IMI Galil assault rifle with several modifications; both the stock and magazine are now made of a high-strength polymer and the stock was lengthened, adapting the weapon for the average South African soldier.

Other detailed differences include the R4's lack of a carry handle and a number of modifications made to its internal operating mechanism.

=== Operating mechanism ===
The R4 is a selective fire, gas-operated weapon that fires from a closed bolt.

As with the IMI Galil, the operating system is derived from that of the AK-47.

It uses ignited powder gases channelled through a vent in the barrel to drive a long stroke piston located above the barrel in a gas cylinder to provide power to the operating system.

The weapon features a self-regulating gas system and a rotary bolt breech locking mechanism (equipped with two locking lugs), which is rotated by a helical camming groove machined into the bolt carrier that engages a control pin on the bolt.

Extraction is carried out by means of a spring-loaded extractor contained in the bolt and a protrusion on the left guide rail inside the receiver acts as the fixed ejector.

Internally, the R4 differs from the Galil in the addition of a new gas tube lock to prevent the tube from shaking loose during sustained fire, and the introduction of much wider sear.

It also has a unique bolt and firing pin, both of which were redesigned to resolve an issue where the firing pin would set off a chambered cartridge with the bolt closed.

The new firing pin is secured by a polyurethane piece inside the bolt except when positively driven forward.

The R4's parts can be interchanged with the Galil ARM with Valmet rifle magazine made for 5.56 NATO caliber being usable for the R4.

=== Features ===
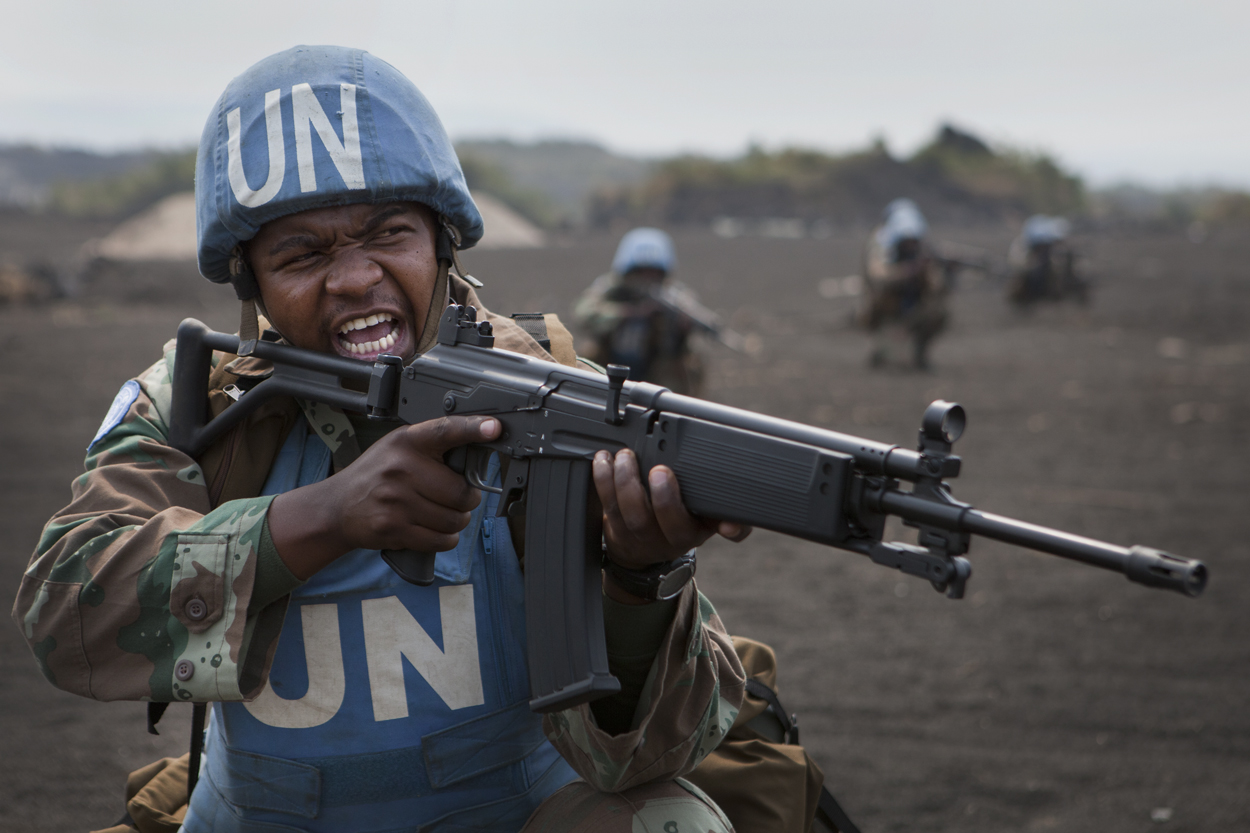
A South African soldier, part of the UN peacekeeping force, armed with an R4 during a training exercise in 2013

The R4 is hammer-fired and uses a trigger mechanism with a 3-position fire selector and safety switch.

The stamped sheet steel selector bar is present on both sides of the receiver and its positions are marked with letters: "S"— indicating the weapon is safe, "R"—single-fire mode ("R" is an abbreviation for "repetition"), and "A"—Afrikaans (Automatic) .

The "safe" setting disables the trigger and secures the weapon from being charged.

The R4 is fed from a steel or synthetic box magazine with a 35-round cartridge capacity (designed to use the 5.56×45mm NATO cartridge with the M193 projectile).

Steel magazines were initially manufactured for the weapon, but this was replaced by a nylon and fiberglass copy to reduce weight. A 50-round steel magazine was produced during the 1980s.

The R4 has a side-folding tubular stock, which folds to the right side of the receiver. The rifle's handguard, pistol grip, magazine, stock arms and shoulder pad are all made from a synthetic material, making it lighter in weight than the equivalent original Galil, which uses heavier metal and wood in these components.

For regular field maintenance and cleaning, the firearm is disassembled into the following components: the receiver and barrel group, bolt carrier, bolt, return mechanism, gas tube, receiver dust cover and magazine.

=== Sights ===
The rifle has conventional iron sights that consist of a front post and a flip-up rear sight with 300 and 500 m apertures.

The front sight is adjustable for windage and elevation and is installed in a durable circular shroud.

The rear sight is welded at the end of the receiver's dust cover. For nighttime use, the R4 is equipped with self-luminous tritium light dots (exposed after placing the rear sight in an intermediate position) installed in a pivoting bar to the front sight base, which folds up in front of the standard post and aligns with two dots in the rear sight notch.

=== Upgrade ===
DLS has introduced remanufactured models of the R4, R5, R6 that have Picatinny rails. DLS has also introduced grenade launchers, grips and other underbarrel attachments.

== Variants ==
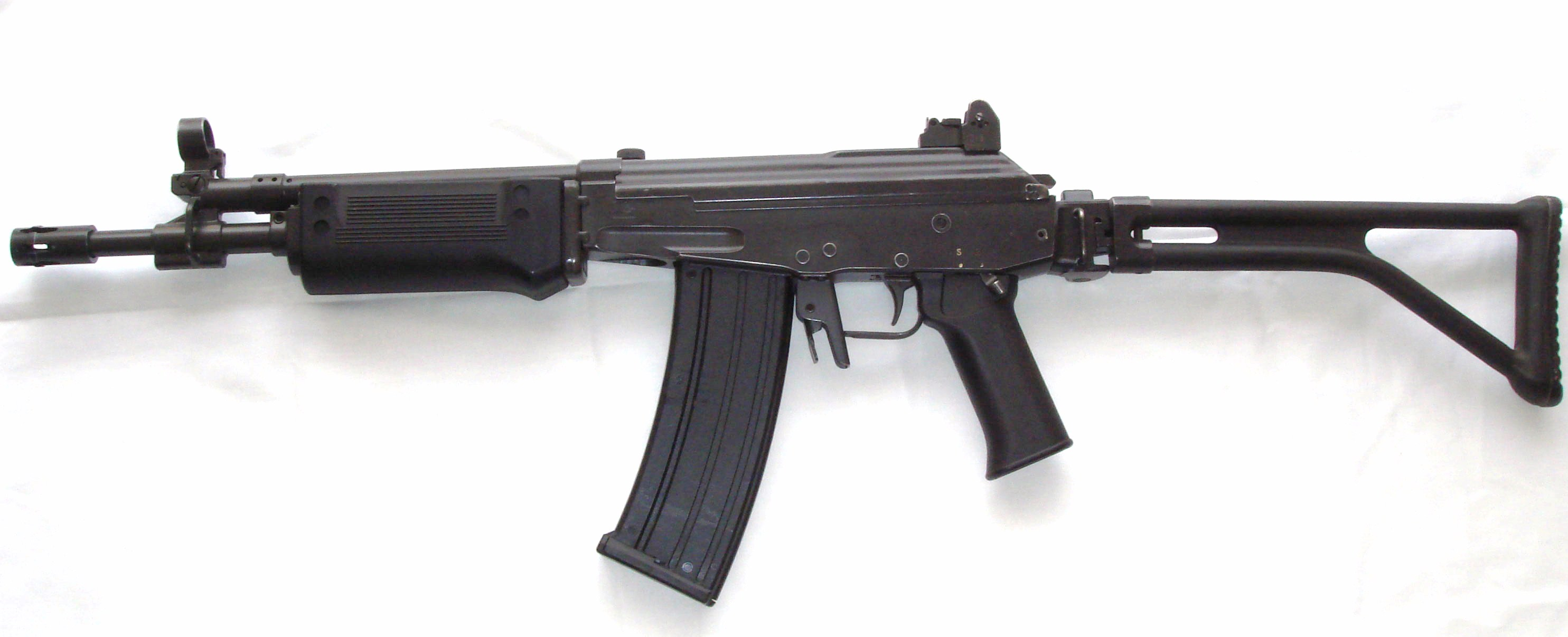
The LM5, a semi-automatic version of the R5 carbine

=== R5 ===
The R5 is the license-produced version of the Galil SAR.

The R5, when compared to the larger R4, has a barrel that is 130 millimetres (5.1 in) shorter, together with a shorter gas system and handguard. It also lacks a bipod, and the flash hider does not support rifle grenades.

=== R6 ===
In the 1990s, an even more compact personal defence weapon variant of the R5 was developed for armoured vehicle crews, designated the R6, which has a further reduced barrel and a shortened gas cylinder and piston assembly. This reduced the barrel length to 279 millimetres (11.0 in).

=== Prototypes ===
Denel developed prototypes for the R7 and R8, a heavy barrelled squad automatic weapon and a locally produced Micro-Galil, respectively, but it is unclear whether these entered production.

=== Semi-automatic variants ===
LIW/DLS also introduced a line of semi-automatic variants of the R4, R5 and R6 called the LM4, LM5 and LM6 respectively, built for civilian and law enforcement users. The rifles were marketed by Musgrave, with the joint venture between the Lyttelton and Musgrave conferring the rifle's "LM" prefix.

Vektor Rifle	Specifications			
Model	Overall Length	Barrel Length	Weight	ROF
R4 Rifle	1,005 mm (39.6 in) stock extended 740 mm (29.1 in) stock folded	460 mm (18.1 in)	4.3 kg (9.48 lb)	650–700 rpm
R5 Carbine	877 mm (34.5 in) stock extended 615 mm (24.2 in) stock folded	332 mm (13.1 in)	3.7 kg (8.2 lb)	650–700 rpm
R6 PDW	805 mm (31.7 in) stock extended 565 mm (22.2 in) stock folded	280 mm (11.0 in)	3.6 kg (7.9 lb)	585 rpm

== Users ==
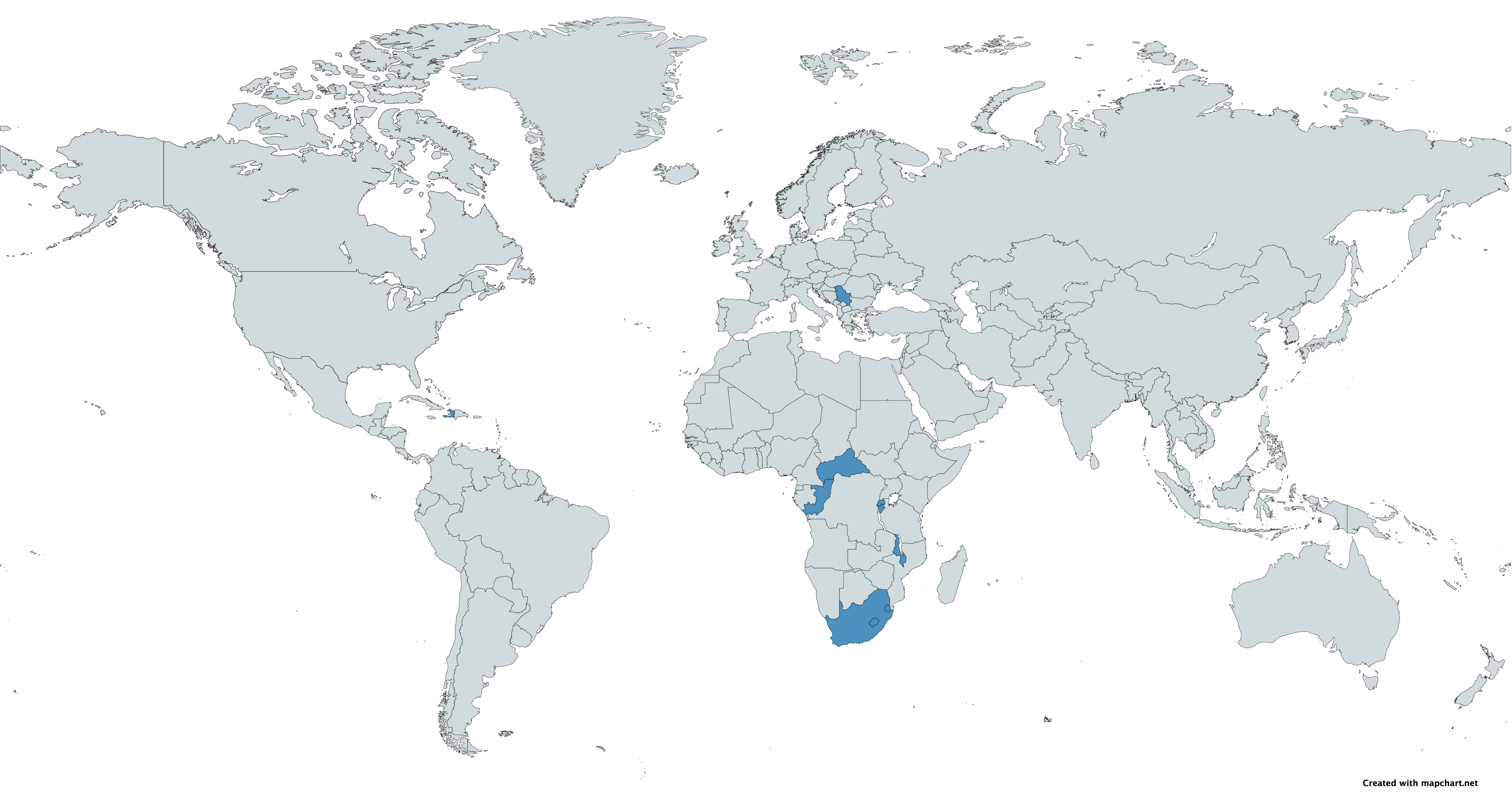
A map with Vektor R4 users in blue

- Burundi
  - Burundian rebels
- Central African Republic
- Eswatini
  - Eswatini Police
- Haiti
  - Armed Forces of Haiti
  - Haitian National Police
- Lesotho
- Malawi
  - Malawi Police Service
- Republic of the Congo
  - 15,900 R4/R5s were delivered to Congolese security forces in 1996 and 1997
- Rwanda
  - Imported for use in the Rwandan National Army as of 1992
  - Some captured by the Rwandan Patriotic Front
- Serbia
  - Special Brigade
  - SAJ
- South Africa
  - Standard issue rifle of the South African National Defence Force
  - The compact R5 carbine is popular among police and special response units

== In popular culture ==
- Savior: 1998 war film starring Dennis Quaid set during the Bosnian War. Quaid's character uses an R4 modified as a designated marksman rifle.
- Hotel Rwanda: 2004 war drama starring Don Cheadle set during the Rwandan genocide; in this film a Rwandan soldier is seen using an R4 in several scenes.
- Machine Gun Preacher: 2011 biopic war film starring Gerard Butler, where soldiers of the South Sudan People's Defence Forces are seen using modified R4s.

== See also ==
- Vektor CR-21
- RK 62
- Zastava M21
- List of assault rifles
- Israel–South Africa Agreement

== Bibliography ==
- Roodhorst, Cor (2015). The Kalashnikov Encyclopedia: Recognition and Weapon Forensic Guide for Kalashnikov Arms and Derivatives III: Serbia–Vietnam. Netherlands: Roodhorst Publications. ISBN 978-90-9027549-9.
- Woźniak, Ryszard (2002). Encyklopedia najnowszej broni palnej – tom 4 R-Z (in Polish). Warsaw, Poland: Bellona. pp. 9–10. ISBN 83-11-09312-1.
