= Olifant (tank) =

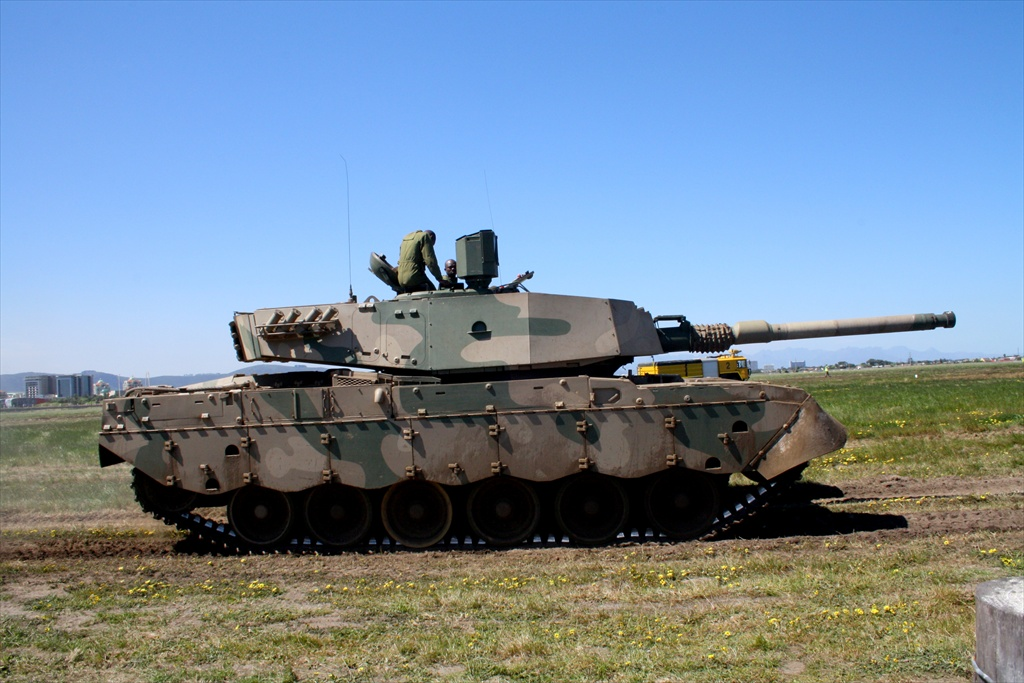
- Olifant Mk.2 Tank
- Type: Main battle tank
- Place of origin: United Kingdom; South Africa

Service history
- In service: 1976–present
- Wars: South African Border War: Operation Moduler; Operation Packer

Production history
- Developed from: Centurion (tank)
- Developed into: The Olifant partially led to the Tank Technology Demonstrator also known as the TTD
- No. built: 224

Specifications
- Mass: 57 long tons (58 t)
- Length: Hull only 24 ft 9.5 in (7.557 m); With gun forward 32 ft 3 in (9.83 m)
- Width: 11 ft 1 in (3.38 m) with side plates 10 ft 9 in (3.28 m) without side plates
- Height: 9 ft 7.75 in (2.94 m)
- Crew: 4 (commander, gunner, loader, driver)
- Armour: 51–152 mm (2.0–6.0 in)
- Main armament: Ordnance QF 20 pounder 84 mm "GT-1" (Mk.1); 105 mm L7 rifled gun "GT-3" (others)
- Secondary armament: Co-axial machine gun .30 cal
- Engine: Rolls-Royce Meteor 4B (Mk.1); V-12 air-cooled Continental AV1790 turbo diesel engine (others); 650 hp (480 kW) at 2550rpm (Meteor); others up to 1,040 hp (780 kW) (Mk.2)
- Transmission: 5-speed Merrit-Brown Z51R Mk. F gearbox (Mk.1); automatic gearbox (Mk.1A, Mk.1B, Mk.2)
- Suspension: Modified Horstmann (Mk.1 and Mk.1A); Torsion Bar (Mk.1B and Mk.2)
- Ground clearance: 1 ft 8 in (0.51 m)
- Maximum speed: 21.5 mph (34.6 km/h) (Mk.1); 35 mph (56 km/h) (Mk.1A, Mk.1B, Mk.2)

The Olifant (Afrikaans for Elephant) is the primary main battle tank of South Africa. It was developed from the British Centurion tank since 1976. These tanks were heavily redesigned and rebuilt by South Africa since 1976 with some help from Israel. Although based on a Centurion tank hull, it has a domestically-produced gun, power pack, transmission, tracks, wheels and fire control system.

== History ==
The British Centurion tanks were the South African main battle tanks since 1957, but they were sold or relegated to reserve roles as a result of maintenance problems compounded by parts shortages, and a tendency to overheat in the hot African climate.

Operation Savannah in 1975 saw the lightly armoured South African forces in Angola threatened by large formations of Soviet tanks supplied to the People's Armed Forces for the Liberation of Angola (FAPLA) and their Cuban allies. Operation Savannah led to the need of further tank trials under Project Semel. South Africa purchased a number of surplus Centurion hulls from Jordan and India, but the United Nations Security Council Resolution 418, which imposed a mandatory arms embargo on South Africa forced them to purchase the tanks without turrets or armament.

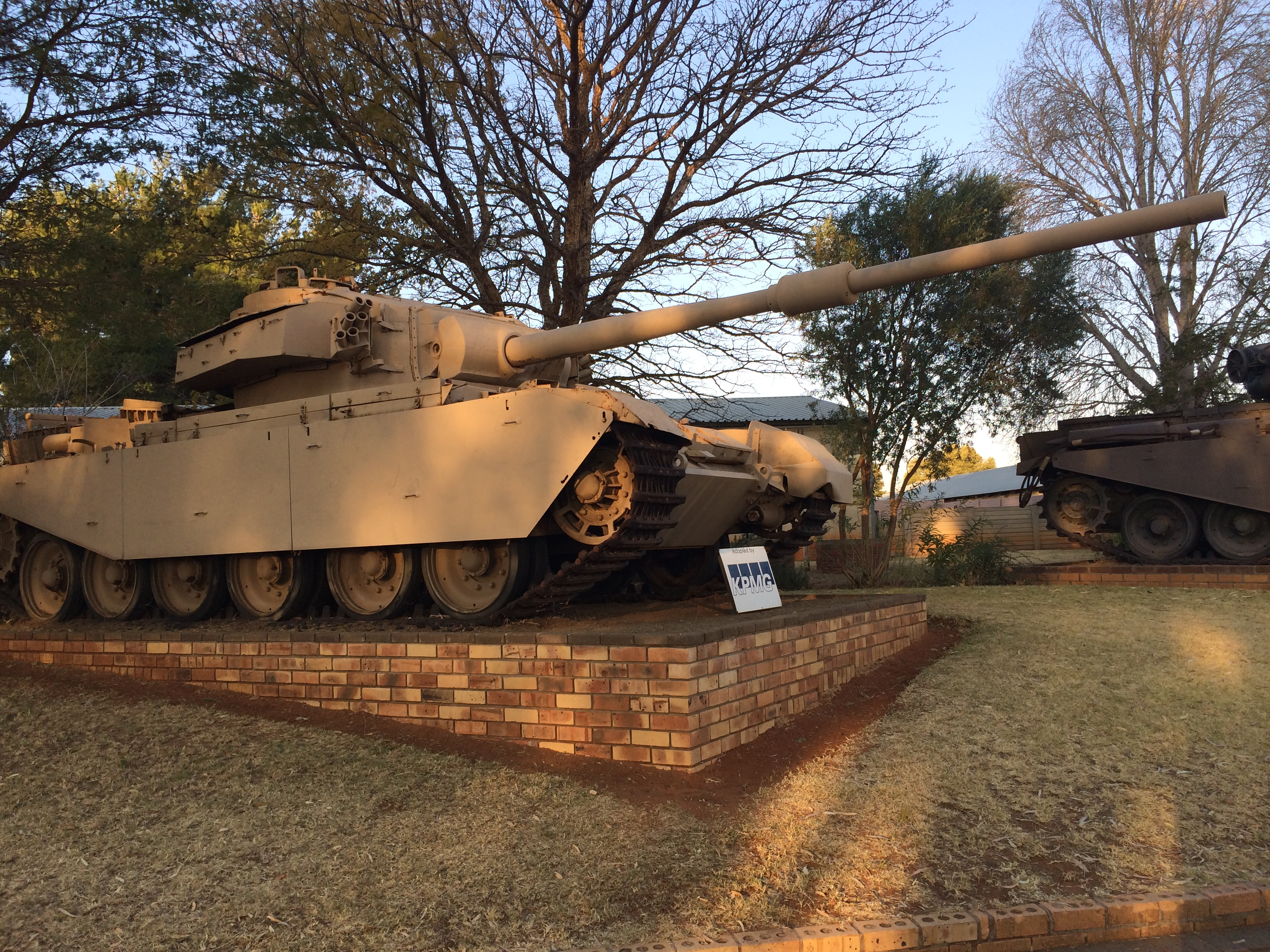
Skokiaan tank at the South African Armour Museum, Bloemfontein. This was the first of eleven prototypes to be built and is the only known survivor, taken July 2014 by User Katangais

During 1968 South Africa made their first attempt of fixing the Centurion's problems in the African environment (such as overheating), the first modification took place with the upgrade being the replacement of the engine with a 372 kW (500 hp), V12, Detroit diesel, model V71 two-stroke diesel engine, the second modification took place in 1973 with the fitting of a Continental fuel-injection engine and a three-speed Allison Semi-Automatic transmission which took place at the 61 base workshop in Pretoria in cooperation with ARMSCOR, the Project was registered under the name of "Project Skokiaan" and saw the development of 3 prototypes whom of which were tested in South West Africa, Walvis Bay (Namibia), the project had a grand total of 11 Skokiaans but the project was ultimately found unsuccessful with the engine having an extremely high fuel consumption, so the project was canceled in 1974 and only 9 Skokiaans were sent to Angola in 1976, although Project Skokiaan failed, it helped directly to the development of the improved Semal upgrade

After the failure of Project Skokiaan, the South African government was obliged by the arms embargo to finance the creation of a new private sector enterprise, the Olifant Manufacturing Company (OMC), to refurbish the Centurions. The Semel program in 1974 counted a total of 35 conversions, soon used operationally. Information from the Sho't program – the Israeli Centurion conversion program – helped to start a more ambitious project. These refurbished tanks were named Olifant Mk.1.

During Operation Askari, South African forces clashed with FAPLA T-54/55 tanks in late 1983 and early 1984; however, due to the respective logistical commitment the Olifants were not deployed. At length the South African mechanised infantry, bolstered by Eland and Ratel-90 armoured car squadrons, succeeded in destroying the Angolan tanks on their own. But eventually, a single squadron of thirteen Olifant Mk.1As was sent to the Angolan border, where they were attached to the 61 Mechanised Battalion Group. Following the Lusaka Accords, which effectively ensured a ceasefire between South Africa and Angola, the Olifant Mk.1 were placed into storage and the tank crews rotated out.

Starting in 1983, OMC had upgraded further Centurions with a 29-litre Teledyne Continental turbocharged diesel engine and a new transmission adopted from the M60 Patton. The refurbished Centurions were armed with a South African variant of the 105 mm L7 rifled main gun known as the "GT-3". They were accepted into service with the South African Armoured Corps as the Olifant Mk.1A in 1985.

The launch of Operation Moduler, following the collapse of the Lusaka Accords in late 1987, led to the Olifant squadron being activated on the direct orders of President P.W. Botha. On 9 November 1987 the Olifants destroyed two Angolan T-55s. Throughout the operation, South African forces typically dispersed into an "arrowhead" formation, with Olifants in the lead, Ratel-90 armoured cars on the flanks, and the remainder of the mechanised infantry to the rear and centre.

Three Olifants were abandoned in a minefield during Operation Packer from March to April 1988; one was retrieved by the Cubans and taken to the town of Cuito Cuanavale and the other two remain to this day in the Angolan bush. Another two were damaged beyond immediate repair by mines but successfully recovered. A number of others suffered varying degrees of track and suspension damage due to mines or Angolan tank fire, but were able to keep moving after field repairs. The operational failure by the SADF ended in a strategic stalemate.

Leopold Scholtz's book The SADF in the Border War 1966-1989 offers detailed observations about the use of Olifants in the war, including their tactics and operations, especially during Operation Packer, which is the "stalemate at Tumpo". For Operation Packer, the book relies on interviews with General Louw, who indicates that Lt. Gen. Kat Liebenberg, Chief of the Army, present at Fouche's HQ, countermanded an order to destroy the abandoned Oliphants, assuming they could be recovered later. They were not, as the SADF vacated the battlefield. As for the two tanks never recovered: "the other two proved impossible to move, so heavily had their tracks and suspensions been damaged." It was the only slightly damaged one that the Cubans recovered which eventually ended up in the USSR.

In the early 1990s, the Olifant Mk.1A was superseded by the Olifant Mk.1B, which incorporated major improvements in armour protection, a slightly more powerful engine, a double armoured floor for protection against mines, and a torsion bar suspension. It is barely recognisable as a Centurion.

An Olifant Mk 1 Armoured Recovery Vehicle on display at the South African National Museum of Military History in 2026

In the 1990s the Olifant Mk.1B Optimum was developed, it was a continuation of the Olifant tank family which had a very similar turret profile to the TTD when the Sharp Composite package was removed, Although it was competing with the TTD, in the end it was more of a stop gap that the SADF was using while working on the TTD and after the SADF finished the Loggim program, they canceled full continuation of the Mk.1B Optimum, with the only form of continuation being some systems that modern Olifant Mk.2s use from the Optimum, it used a GT-8 105mm Rifled Main Cannon and a 7.62x51mm MG-4 Browning Coaxial Machine Gun, with a 950 horsepower diesel powered air cooled V-12 Engine, Advanced Ceramic Armor, an advanced Fire control system and advanced optics that used high quality TVD and NVD systems.

Also in the 1990s, the Tank Technology Demonstrator (TTD) was developed, the TTD was a new start for the Olifant family, instead of continuing the Olifant as the flagship MBT, ARMSCOR the main South African military procurement and manufacturey group started a program in the late 1980s called the Loggim program, also known as TTD program, it was intended to be a domestically produced counter to the Russian T-80, and T-72 main battle tanks with it being projected of being able to counter T-90 tanks as well. Parts of the tank were based on other vehicles such as the U.S. M1 Abrams, German Leopard 2, and French Leclerc, with it outperforming some western tanks in specific categories while being on par with them overall. It had a 105 mm GT-3 QF semi-automatic main gun for the testing version, and a 120 mm GT-6 QF semi-automatic smooth-bore main gun for the production variant, upgradable to a 140 mm QF semi-automatic smooth-bore main gun, it also offers 750mm of composite armor with effective thickness being Unknown.

The Olifant Mk.2 was adapted in 2005 when South Africa was no longer subject to international embargoes. Externally, the Mk.2 looks identical to the Mk.1B but features an upgraded Continental 29 Litre turbo-charged V12 diesel engine that produces 1040 horsepower. Improvements include an upgraded Fire Control System (FCS) and a Computerised Battle System (CBS) which includes a hunter-killer mode. A LIW 120 mm smoothbore gun known as the GT-9 can be used instead of the 105 mm GT-3, L7 rifled gun or GT-7 105mm gun which is based on the L7 rifled gun aswell. In 2018, a total number of 26 Mk.2 tanks was produced.

== Variants ==
Variant	Comment	Image
Skokiaan Mk.1	Main Battle Tank; Tested: 1968-1974; Service: 1976; Engine: 372 kW (500 hp), V12, Detroit diesel, model V71 two-stroke diesel engine; Weaponry: Ordnance QF 20-pounder 84 mm (GT-1).	SADF Skokiaan
Olifant Mk.1	Main Battle Tank; Service: 1979; Engine: Rolls-Royce Meteor 4B 650 hp petrol V12 power pack, 5-speed Merrit-Brown Z51R Mk. F gearbox; Weaponry: Ordnance QF 20-pounder 84 mm (GT-1); Survivalbility: fire extinguishers	SANDF Olifant Mark one
Olifant Mk.1A	Main Battle Tank; Service: 1985; Engine: new 750 hp Continental AV1790 diesel V12 power pack, transmission and automatic gearbox, new coolant system, Weaponry: 105 mm L7 cannon (GT-3), improved fire control and storage layout for ammunition; Survivalbility: fire extinguishers; Mobility: new track wheels; Mineclearing: Both Olifant Mk.1A and B can be fitted with plough-type, electrohydraulic dozer blade or a roller-type mechanical mineclearing set. The 3.5 m wide dozer blade weighs 1500 kg	SANDF Olifant Mark one a
Olifant Mk.1B	Main Battle Tank; Service: 1991; Engine: uprated 950 hp Continental AV1790 V-12 air-cooled turbo diesel engine provides increased range, Weaponry: more powerful 105 mm L7 cannon (GT-3B) with thermal sleeve, laser rangefinder added, 7.62 mm general purpose co-axial machine gun and a 7.62 mm anti-aircraft machine gun fitted, first gen image intensifier, driver's station equipped with day/night sight, gunner's station fitted with day/night sights; Survivability: glacis plate and nose of the hull upgraded with passive armour, turret stand-off armour, double-armour floor, running gear protected against HEAT missiles by new sideskirts, fuel injection system smoke screen in engine's exhaust added, fire detection and suppression system improved; Mobility: torsion bar running gear, hydraulic dampers fitted to the first and last pair of wheels, maximum road speed of 58 km/h and maximum range on internal fuel of 350 km, can ford water to a depth of 1.5m, negotiate gradients and slopes of 60% and 30% and vertical obstacles up to 1m in height	SANDF Olifant Mark one b
Olifant Mk.1B Optimum	Main Battle Tank.; Service: Prototype; Engine: 950 horsepower diesel powered air cooled V-12 Engine.; Weaponry: 105 mm GT-8 rifled gun, 7.62x51 mm MG-4 Browning Coaxial Machine Gun, an advanced Thermal Vision Device and Night Vision Device, and an advanced Fire Control System.; Survivability: Same glacis armor as the Mk.1B but has a sharp turret advanced composite armor package resembling the German Leopard 2A5 that uses Ceramic to defend against Russian 125 mm APFSDS rounds.	SADF Olifant Mk.1B Optimum
Olifant Mk.2	Main Battle Tank; Service: 2007; Engine: uprated 1 040 hp Continental AV1790 diesel engine; Weaponry: 105 mm L7 cannon (GT-7), can use a Denel GT-8 or Denel GT-3, periscopic stabilized day/ thermal gunner sight with laser rangefinder, upgraded ballistic computer added to the fire control system, panoramic commander sight, full solution fire control system, fire on the move and day and night time engagements, ready rounds located in carousel mounted turret basket, allowing fire rate of 10rpm; Survivability: modular composite armour sloping on turret and hull front, in case of ammunition ignition, blow-off panels and armoured doors protect the crew	SANDF Olifant Mark Two
Olifant Armour Recovery	Armoured recovery vehicle built on the chassis of an Olifant	SANDF Olifant Tank Recovery
Tank Technology Demonstrator (TTD)	Main Battle Tank.; Service: Prototype/Canceled; Engine: V8 Diesel Engine, 1234hp; Weaponry: 105 mm GT-3B, planned 120 mm modularly upgradable to 140 mm GT-6, 7.62 mm/7.92 mm machine gun to be placed on top of the turret, a highly advanced Hunter-killer Fire Control System, 2nd generation Thermal and Night Vision Devices.; Survivability: 750 mm of composite armor with an effective thickness unknown	SADF Tank Technology Demonstrator

== Tank Technology Demonstrator ==
Tank Technology Demonstrator
- A drawn image of the TTD tank from the side view
- Type: Main Battle tank
- Place of origin: South Africa

Service history
- In service: Never entered service, tested from 1992-1994
- Used by: South Africa

Production history
- Designer: ARMSCOR, Olifant Manufacturing Company (OMC), Lyttleton Engineering Works (LEW)
- Designed: 1992
- Manufacturer: ARMSCOR, Olifant Manufacturing Company (OMC), Lyttleton Engineering Works (LEW)
- Developed from: Olifant
- Developed into: Systems helped create the Olifant Mk.2
- Variants: Prototype Variant, Proposed Production Variant

Specifications
- Mass: Battle ready: 58.3 Tons
- Length: 7.78m (25.5ft)
- Width: 3.62m (11.9ft)
- Height: 2.99m (9.8ft)
- Crew: 4
- Armor: Armor Thickness of 750mm with compatibility for ERA, Turret armor Unknown
- Main armament: 105mm GT3 QF Prototype Variant, 120mm GT6 QF Proposed Production Variant, Upgradable to 140mm QF GT6
- Secondary armament: 7.62mm Machine Gun and or 7.92mm Machine Gun
- Engine: Twin-turbo intercooled V-8 Diesel engine 1234hp (920kw) @ 1200rpm (21.16 hp/t)
- Power/weight: 21.16 hp/t
- Payload capacity: 54 rounds of 105mm Ammunition
- Transmission: 4 forward and 2 reverse gears
- Suspension: Torsion bar
- Fuel capacity: 1600L (422gals) of diesel fuel
- Operational range: On Road 400km (249mi) Off Road 300km (186mi)
- Maximum speed: On Road 71kph (44mph) Off Road 35kph (22mph)

The Tank Technology Demonstrator otherwise known as TTD was a Main Battle Tank developed after the South African Border War ended meant to replace the Olifant and to counter the T-72.

=== History ===
During the South African intervention in Angola during the Angolan Civil War, the SADF had seen that their Olifant tanks would soon be over taken by more advanced Soviet tanks such as the T-72, so during the war ARMSCOR and OMC started development of Upgrades for the Olifant leading to the Olifant Mk.1B and development of a new Main Battle Tank, the development of the TTD began in 1983 with the Olifant Manufacturing Company (OMC) designing the hull and Lyttleton Engineering Works (LEW/LIW) working on the turret and main armament with some sources calling the project "Loggim".

In 1992 the first TTD Prototype was finished with a 105mm GT-3 cannon, an advanced Hunter-killer Fire Control System with thermal imaging devices, the ability to carry ERA and the ability to have a Coaxial or Roof mounted 7.62/7.92 machine gun, a 4 man crew and a 1234hp engine, it was comparable to the M1 Abrams, Leopard 2 and Leclerc with its design appearing closest to the Leopard 2.

In 1994 after all the Arms Embargo's against South Africa ended, ARMSCOR saw no need for the development of a domestic MBT as the Cold War had ended and if they ever needed another MBT they could buy it from foreign nations so they canceled the project and put the only TTD Prototype in the SA armor museum.

=== Variants ===
==== Prototype Variant ====
It had a 105mm GT-3 as its main armament with the compatibility of a Coaxial machine gun or roof mounted machine gun, it had an Advanced FCS that had TVD, NVD and a Laser Rangefinder, the hull could take ERA and the front glacis of the hull was later rated for defending against 125mm Soviet APFSDS and HEAT-FS shells at a protection equivalent of 750mm while the turret remains classified.

==== Proposed Production Variant ====
It was meant to be the Production Variant of the TTD but never came into service because Production of the TTD was cut, it was meant to have a 120mm GT-6 cannon which could be modularly swapped to a 140mm cannon and would have the exact same capabilities as the Prototype Variant.
