= 6mm Musgrave =

South African rifle cartridge

- Type: Rifle
- Place of origin: South Africa

Production history
- Designer: Ben Musgrave Jnr
- Designed: 1955
- Manufacturer: Musgrave

Specifications
- Parent case: .303 British
- Case type: Rimmed, bottleneck
- Bullet diameter: 0.243 in (6mm)
- Neck diameter: 0.271 in (6.9mm)
- Shoulder diameter: 0.4008 in (10.2mm)
- Base diameter: 0.4598 in (11.68mm)
- Rim diameter: 0.5378 in (13.7mm)
- Rim thickness: 0.0642 in (16.3mm)
- Case length: 2.2083 in (56.1mm) / (trim length = 2.1983 in (55.84mm))
- Overall length: 2.8606 in (72.6mm)
- Case capacity: 49.9 gr H_{2}O (3 cm^{3})
- Rifling twist: 1-10 inches
- Primer type: Large rifle
- Maximum pressure: 46,500
- Maximum CUP: 45,000 CUP

Ballistic performance
Bullet mass/type	Velocity	Energy
80 gr (5 g) SP	3,120 ft/s (951 m/s)	1,729 ft⋅lbf (2,344 J)
85 gr (6 g) SP	3,084 ft/s (940 m/s)	1,795 ft⋅lbf (2,434 J)
90 gr (6 g) SP	2,950 ft/s (899 m/s)	1,739 ft⋅lbf (2,358 J)
100 gr (6 g) SP	2,805 ft/s (855 m/s)	1,747 ft⋅lbf (2,369 J)
- Test barrel length: 24"

The 6mm Musgrave was a rifle cartridge invented by Ben Musgrave and introduced by Musgrave (firearms) in 1969

The cartridge's design was based on necking down the .303 British, with the original intent of it being a Springbok caliber for hunting on open plains in South Africa's Karoo, Kalahari, and Namakwaland. It also served as a modern cartridge suitable for converting old Lee-Enfields with worn out .303 barrels.

Like the .243 Winchester, it has a fast rifle twist of 1-10 inches. However, if 105 grain bullets are used, it is recommended that a 1-9 or even faster twist is used to stabilize the bullets.

Few manufacturers specifically create 6mm Musgrave rounds, with PMP (Pretoria Metal Pressings) method.

Most bullet manufacturers offer 6mm (.243") bullets that are suitable for use with rifles chambered in 6mm Musgrave.

== See also ==
- List of rifle cartridges
- 6 mm caliber
