= Rooikat =

South African armoured fighting vehicle

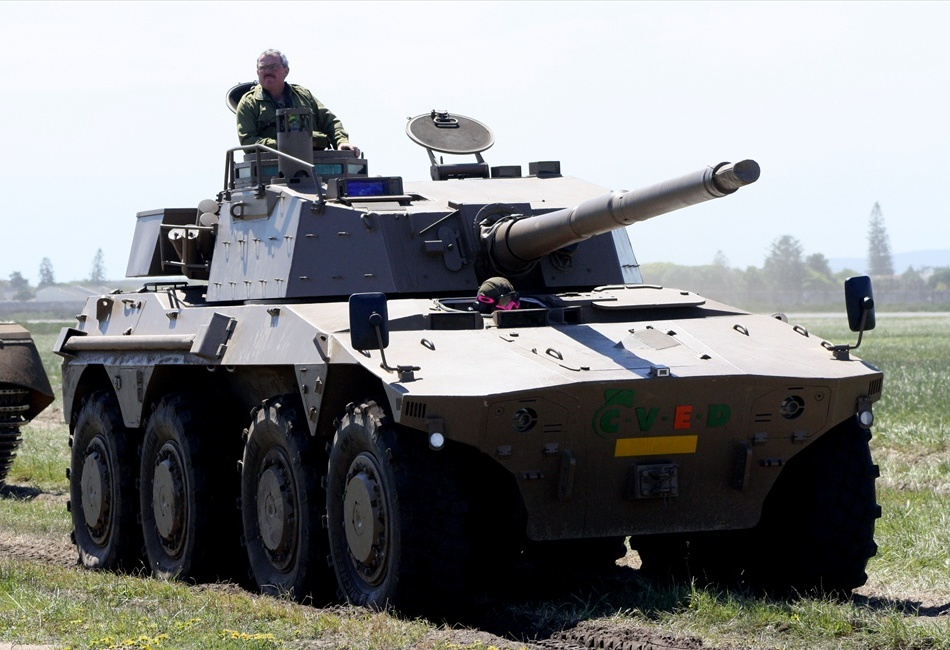
- Type: Armoured fighting vehicle
- Place of origin: South Africa

Service history
- In service: 1987–present
- Wars: Operation Boleas

Production history
- Designed: 1982
- Produced: 1987–2020

Specifications
- Mass: 28 t (28 long tons; 31 short tons)
- Length: 7.1 m (23 ft 4 in); 8.2 m (26 ft 11 in) with gun forward
- Width: 2.9 m (9 ft 6 in)
- Height: 2.6 m (8 ft 6 in) turret roof
- Crew: 4
- Main armament: Denel GT-4 (Based off of the Oto Melara) L/62 rifled gun
- Secondary armament: 2 x Denel MG4 7.62 mm machine guns; 8 x 81 mm smoke grenade dischargers
- Engine: 10-cylinder water-cooled diesel 414 kW (555 hp)
- Power/weight: 14.89 kW (19.97 hp)/t
- Suspension: 8×8 wheeled, Fully independent active trailing arm
- Operational range: 1000 km (621 mi)
- Maximum speed: Road: 120 km/h (75 mph); Off-road: 60 km/h (37 mph)

The Rooikat (Afrikaans for Caracal; lit. 'Red cat') is a South African armoured reconnaissance vehicle equipped with a stabilised 76 mm (3.0 in) high velocity gun for organic anti-tank and fire support purposes. The Rooikat's main armament is the GT-4 which was built with the Oto Melara 76 naval gun as its basis, to which it is nearly identical in terms of technical performance and statistics. The Rooikat can also fire the same ammunition as the naval gun, albeit modified with new percussion primers in the shells.

== Development history ==
=== Background ===
From the mid-1960s to the mid-1980s, the standard reconnaissance vehicle of the South African Defence Force was the Eland-90, a four-wheeled armoured car modelled closely after the Panhard AML-90. However, the Eland was designed for border patrols and internal security, and proved ill-suited to countering tank warfare. The Eland's limitations were first observed during combat in Operation Savannah, a 1975 South African incursion into Angola. This led to its supplementation in the late 1970s with the much heavier, six-wheeled Ratel-90 infantry fighting vehicle. The Ratel proved to be a successful interim measure because it could both carry troops and provide fire support.

In 1984, South Africa launched Operation Askari, which saw its mechanised and motorised infantry contingents threatened by large Angolan tank formations for the first time. Both the Ratel-90 and Eland-90 were used as improvised tank destroyers but performed inadequately against T-54/55 tanks of the People's Armed Forces for the Liberation of Angola (FAPLA). The armoured cars were decisively outranged by the Angolan tanks, and their inability to fire on the move resulted in a poor rate of engagement. As a direct result of Askari, the Eland was removed from combat service and a squadron of Olifant tanks kept on permanent standby to assist with neutralising enemy armour during future South African operations.

As early as the mid-1970s, the South African Armoured Corps had issued a requirement for a "heavy armoured car" capable of improving upon the Eland's 4X4 chassis, which limited mobility, and the mediocre range of its 90 mm (3.5 in) low pressure gun. Research was undertaken for a New Generation Armoured Car project between 1976 and 1979, when three 8X8 prototypes were built by Sandock-Austral and trialled in Potchefstroom. The prototypes were built using chassis components of the Ratel, Eland and Alvis Saracen, respectively, and were armed with a 77 mm HV tank gun. The Saracen and Ratel derivatives could each accommodate four crewmen – gunner, commander, loader and driver – while the Eland derivative accommodated five, including one passenger. These trials were primarily for the purpose of evaluating the vehicles' performance on different types of local terrain; while none of the three were deemed acceptable for the New Generation Armoured Car programme, the chassis built with Eland components continued to influence later prototypes—particularly with regards to its suspension features.

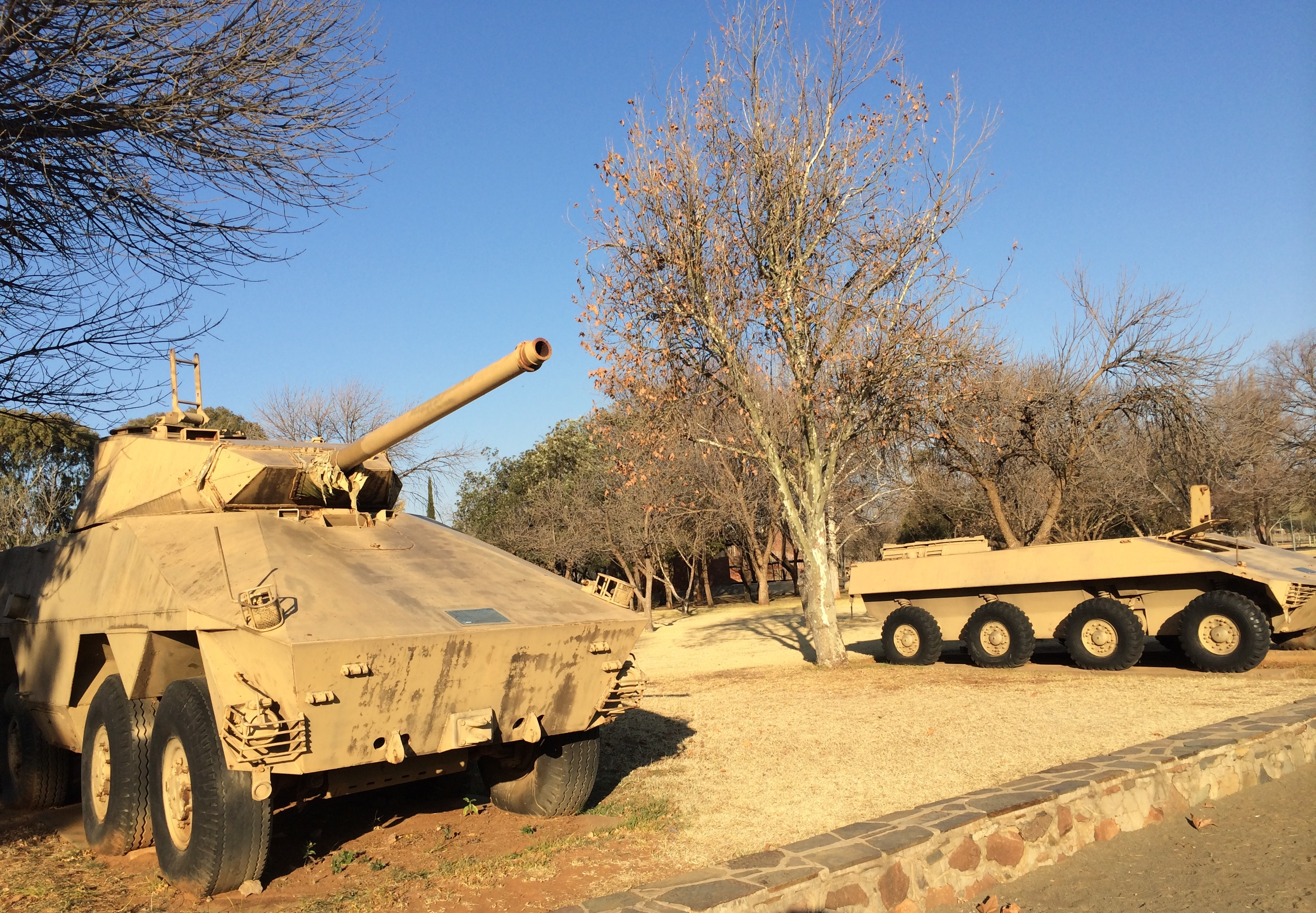
Test Beds for the New Generation Armoured Car Project: the one on the left, Concept 1, was built with automotive and chassis components from a Ratel, and the one on the right, Concept 2, an Eland Mk7.

Three more contenders appeared in 1982: the Class 3 Prototype otherwise known as Bismarck, the Cheetah Mk1, and the Cheetah Mk2. These prototypes were designed with technical assistance from a West German engineering firm, Thyssen-Henschel. The Class 3 Prototype an eight-wheeled vehicle which weighed over 40 t (39 long tons; 44 short tons) and carried a 105 mm (4.1 in) Denel GT-7 tank gun. The Cheetah Mk1 was six-wheeled and carried a lightweight 76mm gun or a 60 mm breech-loading mortar (adopted from the Eland-60); it resembled a modified TH-400. Also known as "Model 2B", the Cheetah Mk2 was eight-wheeled and possessed an inferior range to the Cheetah Mk1, but was considerably faster. These prototypes were trialled in March 1984 and the Cheetah Mk2 was accepted by the South African Army. The Armoured Corps had hoped to simplify logistics by replacing both the Eland and Ratel simultaneously with a new chassis that could double as both a reconnaissance vehicle and an infantry fighting vehicle, similar to the Ratel-90 interim measure, but these plans were shelved. A fourth, multirole eight-wheeled prototype evaluated in 1984 was rejected and a decision was made to retain the Ratel for the foreseeable future while pursuing the separate development of the Cheetah Mk2, now denoted as the Rooikat. In its final form the Rooikat incorporated several features adopted directly from the Eland-90, namely a similar commander's cupola, the same turret periscopes, and the mounting of all eight wheels on trailing arms, with the same hydropneumatic shock absorbers and coil springs.

The first Rooikats were manufactured by Sandock-Austral beginning in September 1987, and delivered to the South African Army for further tests by December. Another three were delivered in October 1988. The Rooikat did not enter service in large numbers until August 1989, when a single South African armoured squadron began receiving it. Mass production commenced around mid-1990.

=== Service ===
Upon its inception in 1994 the South African National Defence Force (SANDF) immediately ordered the retirement of the surviving Eland-90 fleet. Nevertheless, some Elands remained with reserve units as late as 1996 until sufficient numbers of the Rooikat could be produced to phase them out. The SANDF subsequently issued a requirement for another 66 Rooikats from Sandock-Austral, which had been absorbed by Land Systems OMC. New SANDF doctrine placed an emphasis on the Rooikat's primary role of reconnaissance, as well as the harassment of enemy rearguard units. In a marked departure from the manoeuvre-oriented anti-tank tactics of the South African Border War, Rooikat crews were also trained to engage tanks only from defilade or otherwise static defensive positions.

Just prior to general elections in 1994, the South African Army deployed the Rooikat for internal patrols. During the Southern African Development Community intervention in Lesotho, Rooikats of the 1 Special Service Battalion were called up to reinforce South African mechanised units then skirmishing with Lesotho Army mutineers. The armoured cars arrived in Maseru, the capital of Lesotho, on 22 September 1998 and participated in various security operations.

== Variants ==
Variant	Description	Image
Rooikat 76	Original version, featuring a 76mm Denel GT-4 main gun.	
Rooikat 105	Upgraded version with 105 mm Denel GT-7, prototype only.	Rooikat Armoured Car 105 mm
ZA-35	Anti-aircraft gun platform, prototype only.	Rooikat ZA 35
ZA-HVM	Surface-to-air missile platform, prototype only.	Rooikat SAM
35/ZT-3	Anti-tank missile platform, prototype only.	Rooikat antitank
Rooikat 120	120mm GT-12 Variant, never built	
Rooikat MTTD	Medium Turret Technology Demonstrator (MTTD) made to test new technologies	Rooikat Armoured Fighting Vehicle MTTD
Rooikat CVED	Conventional vehicle electric drive technology demonstrator (CVED), same as Rooikat 76 but with a brand new electric drive system	

=== Rooikat 105 ===
In 1990 an upgrade and redesign programme was started by Reumech OMC to customize the Rooikat for the international market, and by 1994 the development of a Rooikat 105 prototype with a 105mm rifled gun was completed.

The Rooikat 105 is designed for high mobility day and night combat operations. Passive image intensifiers and thermal imaging equipment for night driving, navigation and weapon deployment permit round-the-clock combat operations. The Rooikat 105 is equipped with a GT-7 105mm tank gun. The gun fires the full range of NATO full-pressure 105mm ammunition including generation I, II and III rounds. The gun, fitted with a 51-calibre thermal sleeve encased barrel, fires six rounds a minute. There are two 7.62mm machine guns, one co-axial to the main armament and one at the commander's position, for general purpose ground and air defence. The vehicle is equipped with two banks of 81mm smoke grenade launchers, mounted in a forward firing position on each side of the turret. The system is electrically operated. The smoke grenades form a dense protective smoke screen, which can be sustained using an exhaust smoke generator. The digital fire control system takes data from a suite of sensors and provides an automatic fire control solution. Automatic data input includes target range from a laser rangefinder, target speed and direction derived from tracking the target, crosswind speed, weapon tilt and the characteristics of the weapon. Manual data input includes ammunition type and environmental data. The fire control system allows the Rooikat to engage enemy targets while on the move across rough terrain. The time between laser ranging the target and firing is approximately two seconds. Three variations of fire directing systems are offered. The most complex system incorporates a primary stabilized gunner's sight, automatic computation and implementation of ballistic offset of the weapon, electro-mechanical gun control, stabilized main weapon, gunner's sight with day / night channel slaved to the main weapon and an independent panoramic commander's sight.

=== ZA-35 ===
The Rooikat ZA-35 Self-Propelled Anti-Aircraft Gun (SPAAG) version was developed by ARMSCOR in the early 90s. The ZA-35 is armed with two Lyttelton Engineering M-35 guns. These guns have a combined rate of fire at 1,100 rounds per minute and fire HE-FRAG rounds against air targets and AP-I against light armoured vehicles. The ZA-35 is fitted with an EDR 110 surveillance and tracking radar, which can track up to 100 air targets simultaneously. The antenna can be raised to a height of about 5 m (16 ft 5 in) for increased visibility, when the vehicle is stationary. It can provide targeting data to other nearby SPAAGs and air defence systems, which do not have radars. It is also fitted with a computerized fire control system, fully stabilized gunner's sight and a laser rangefinder.

=== ZA-HVM ===
The ZA-HVM was based on the same chassis as the Rooikat, and was intended to be used together with the ZA-35. It would have used the SAHV-3 surface-to-air missile. There is photographic evidence of a wooden mockup turret prototype and there is evidence of it being finished but never photographed.Although the ZA-HVM hasn't been confirmed photographicly to have been finished, the G6-HVM – which was based on the G6 Rhino Howitzer – was finished and used the same SAHV-3 missiles the ZA-HVM was supposed to use.

=== Rooikat 35/ZT-3 ===
A prototype Rooikat 35 was also developed with a new turret to incorporate the ZT3 Ingwe anti-tank missiles and It used a 35mm autocannon, it did not enter production.

=== Rooikat 120 ===
Was a advanced proposed Rooikat variant that never got past testing phase, it was planned to use the GT-12 cannon which would be able to use NATO standard ammunition, have a unmanned turret, autoloader, a 7.62mm Co-axial Machine Gun and was planned to have a APS system with the same optics as the Rooikat MTTD, it helped greatly towards the development of the MTTD.

=== Rooikat Medium Turret Technology Demonstrator (MTTD) ===
The MTTD is one of the most advanced Rooikat Variants acting as a testbed for new technologies, its turret houses a GT-7 cannon but has also tested the GT-8 LIW 105mm Cannon before, it can also house a 120mm cannon called the GT-12 and it has compatibility for a Machine Gun but stock wise it doesn't have one, it has compatibility for a Rexnord Active Protection System (APS). 1st Variant is a Kinetic Hard-kill APS that fires a solid projectile at incoming projectiles to shoot them down. 2nd is a Soft-kill Laser foam material that throws off laser-guided missile guidance systems. It has the capability to upgrade its devices, but stock wise the prototype has Gen 2 thermal devices and also Gen 2-3 night vision devices, the Rooikat MTTD is more of a technology demonstrator than an actual production variant with it mostly being used to test new technological advances, and it is because of the Rooikat MTTD that many modern day AFVs and MBTs alike are experimenting with unmanned turrets and APS systems.

=== Rooikat conventional vehicle electric drive technology demonstrator (CVED) ===
One Rooikat was turned into a conventional vehicle electric drive technology demonstrator (CVED) and displayed at AAD2006 in Cape Town in September of that year. The CVED project involved HIT, IAD, Nezrotek, Hutchinson (France), Kessler Magnet Motor (Germany) and MTU (Germany). VEG Magazine reported in 2006 the vehicle was fitted with a power supply control system feeding eight wheel-hub mounted M67/0 electric units and a two-phase pneumatic gearbox.

== Operators ==
- South African National Defence Force

== See also ==
Vehicles of comparable role, performance, and era

- B1 Centauro – (Italy)
- M1128 mobile gun system – (United States, Canada)
- Type 16 maneuver combat vehicle – (Japan)
- Vextra 105 – (France)
