= Vektor CR-21 =

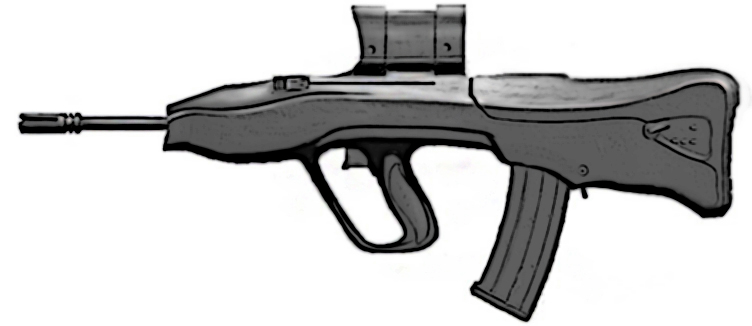
- Type: Bullpup assault rifle
- Place of origin: South Africa

Production history
- Designer: Denel Land Systems
- Designed: 1997
- Manufacturer: Denel
- No. built: 200
- Variants: CR-21 carbine

Specifications
- Mass: 3.72 kg (8.2 lb)
- Length: 760 mm (29.9 in)
- Barrel length: 460 mm (18.1 in)
- Cartridge: 5.56×45mm NATO
- Caliber: 5.56mm
- Action: Gas-operated, rotating bolt
- Rate of fire: 700 round/min (full auto)
- Muzzle velocity: 980 m/s
- Effective firing range: 400m
- Feed system: 20 or 35-round detachable R4 magazines
- Sights: Fiber optic illuminated reflex sight

The Vektor CR-21 is a South African bullpup assault rifle ("CR-21" being an abbreviation of Combat Rifle 21st Century) chambered for 5.56×45mm NATO ammunition. It was designed by Denel Land Systems as a possible replacement for the South African National Defence Force (SANDF)'s Vektor R4, though Denel Land Systems has since shifted focus to offering an upgraded R4 rifle to the SANDF instead.

== History ==
The CR-21 was manufactured in the 1990s for potential contracts in the South African military, but it raised little interest with them along the South African police and international contracts.

200 CR-21s were made in total with parts that can be used for another 200 CR-21s.

== Design ==
First unveiled in 1997, the CR-21 has a sleek, futuristic design and uses the bullpup layout. This enables the rifle to be as short as a typical carbine, whilst still retaining the muzzle velocity of longer assault rifles. However, this makes the CR-21 only capable of being fired from the right hand as the ejection port is located on the back right side of the rifle. The port cannot be changed from side to side.

Internally, the CR-21 uses a slightly modified version of the Kalashnikov action found in the R4 assault rifle, which is known for its reliability and relatively low weight. The rifle also makes significant use of high-impact polymer, with the only exposed metal part on the rifle being the front of the barrel with its integral flash suppressor. Both of these result in the rifle having a low loaded weight, of 3.72 kg (8.2 lbs).

The CR-21 comes standard with a 1× magnification optical sight with an illuminated reticle that does not require batteries. This sight is mounted on a sight rail, allowing easy removal and attachment, as well as the use of a range of different sight options. The forward handgrip has been specially designed to be easily removed and replaced with an under-barrel grenade launcher such as the M203 grenade launcher.

The R4-type magazines used come in 20 and 35-round capacities.

== Variants ==
A CR-21 carbine was said to have been developed by Vektor.

== Users ==
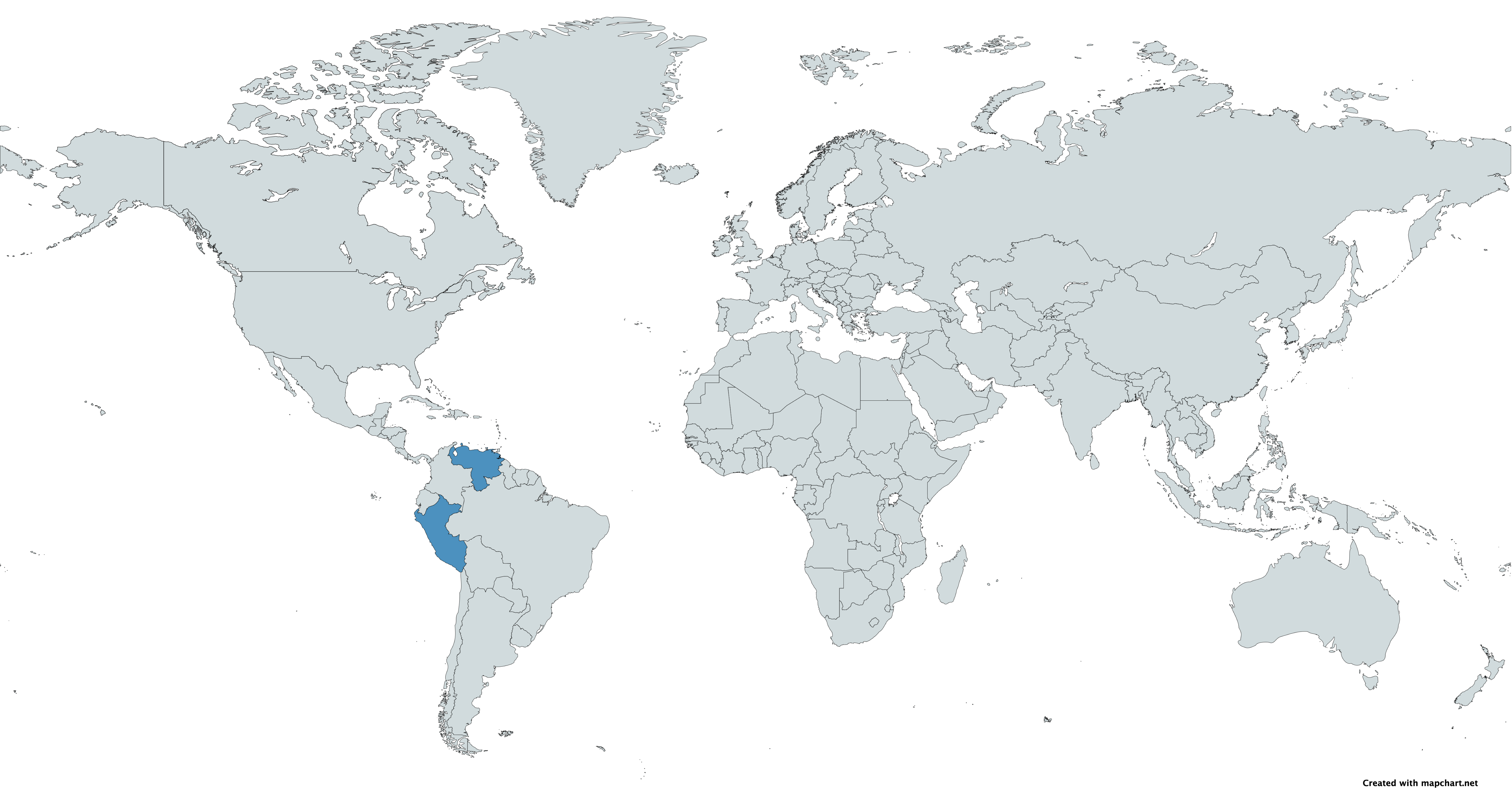
A map with nations who use the Vektor CR-21 in blue

- Peru: Used by Parachute Commandos and Special Forces Brigade.
- Venezuela: Used by the Guardia Nacional Bolivariana and Comandos Rurales.
