= Lusaka Accords =

1984 treaty declaring a ceasefire between Angola and South Africa

Lusaka Accords of 1984
- Type: Ceasefire
- Parties: Angola; South Africa

The Lusaka Accords of 1984 declared a ceasefire between Angola and South Africa during the Angolan Civil War and South African Border War, a withdrawal of South African troops from Angola and established a commission to oversee the treaty's implementation. The agreement was short-lived because of the widely-differing interpretations of the treaty's implications. The South African Defence Force (SADF), represented by Johannes "Jannie" Geldenhuys, wished for a phased Cuban withdrawal in concert with their own units. They also insisted that the People's Armed Forces for the Liberation of Angola (FAPLA) were to assist in expelling Namibian insurgents from Angolan territory. However, the FAPLA had no intention of allowing its Cuban allies to depart and remained noticeably unenthusiastic about referencing Namibian parties, particularly the South West African People's Organization and its military wing, the People's Liberation Army of Namibia (PLAN), in the agreement. For its part, South Africa did nothing to combat the National Union for the Total Independence of Angola (UNITA), which also retained a presence in the SADF's operational area. The continued activity of PLAN and UNITA resulted in violations of the accords by both sides.

Fidel Castro criticised the Lusaka Accords as "impermissible and incredible", a statement that was echoed by the Soviet Union. That criticism by Angola's two chief military benefactors led to a breakdown in the treaty. It was annulled de facto on 16 May 1985, and an escalation of hostilities followed.
