= Denel Land Systems =

Division of the South African state-owned Denel group

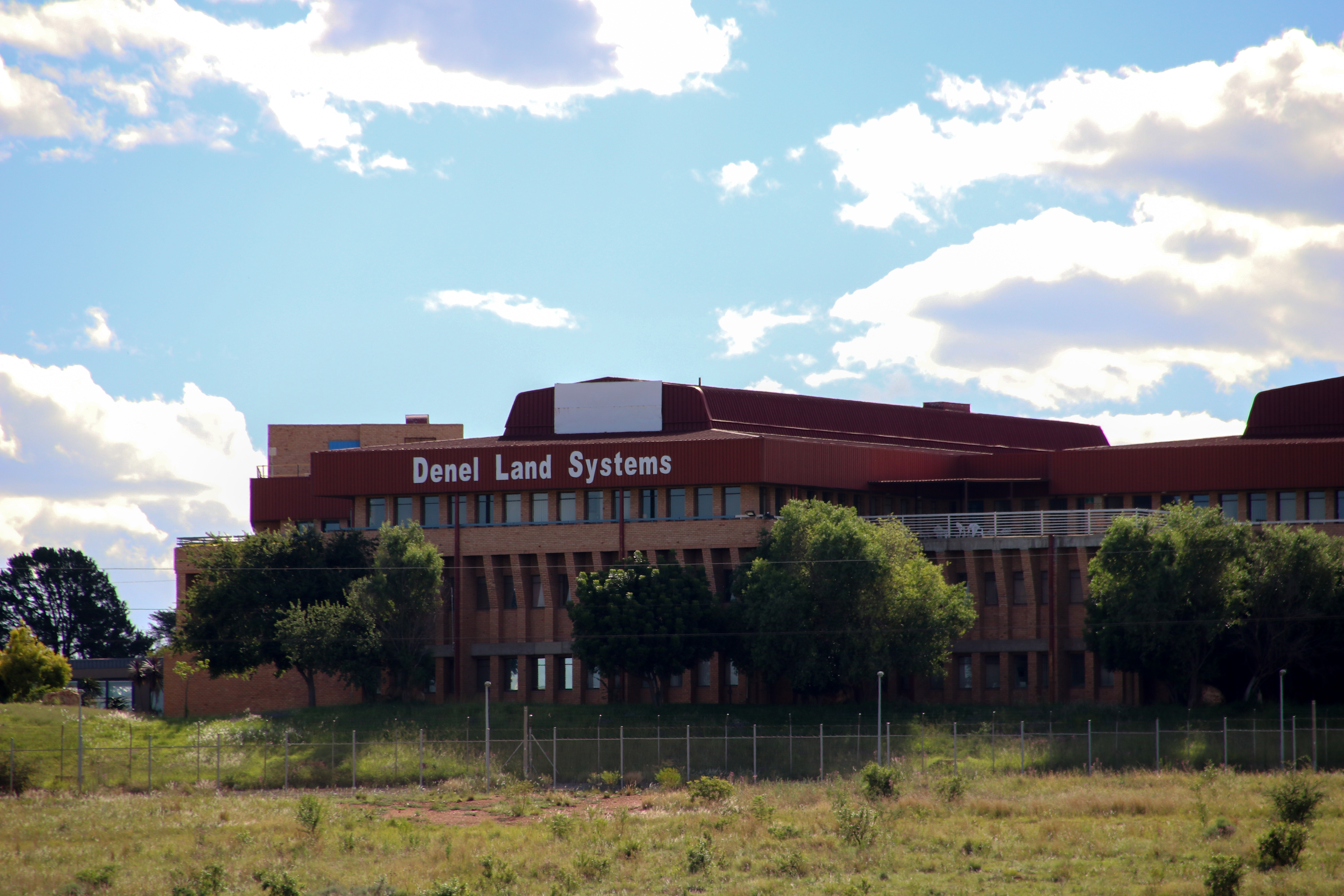
- Denel Land Systems in Centurion, South Africa
- Formerly: Lyttelton Engineering Works (LIW—from Afrikaans: Lyttelton Ingenieurswerke)
- Industry: Armaments Manufacturing
- Headquarters: Centurion, South Africa
- Parent: Denel group
- Website: www.denellandsystems.co.za

Denel Land Systems is a division of the Denel group.

It was formerly Lyttelton Engineering Works (LIW—from Afrikaans: Lyttelton Ingenieurswerke), a subsidiary part of the commercial network from Armscor. It then became the Systems division of the Land Systems Group of Denel.

They are responsible for the design and manufacture of systems ranging from artillery (such as G5 howitzer and G6 howitzer) to small arms such as the R4 assault rifle.

== Products ==
=== Vehicles ===
- Rooikat: 8×8 armoured combat vehicle with a GT4 76 mm (3.0 in) gun in turret
- Badger IFV: 8×8 wheeled infantry fighting vehicle
- G7: T7-52 105 mm (4.1 in) light howitzer
- G5: T6-52 155 mm (6.1 in) towed howitzer
- G6 Rhino: T6-52 155 mm (6.1 in) self-propelled howitzer
- G6 Marksman: G6 base vehicle combined with a British Marksman SPAAG turret
- Tank Technology Demonstrator (TTD): A new refined Main Battle Tank that Denel helped develop which used a GT-3 and was planned to use a GT-6

=== Turrets ===
- MCT 12.7: Turret with 12.7 mm (0.50 in) machine gun
- LCT 20: Turret with a GA-1 20 mm (0.79 in) gun
- LCT 30: Turret with a GI-30 30 mm (1.2 in) gun
- MCT 30: Turret with a GI-30 30 mm (1.2 in) gun
- LCT 30 ATGM: Turret with a GI-30 30 mm (1.2 in) gun and four Ingwe ATGM launchers
- LMT 105: Turret with a GT7 105 mm (4.1 in) tank gun
- T7-52: Turret with a GT7 105 mm (4.1 in) howitzer gun
- T6-52: Turret with a Denel 155mm Howitzer Gun 155 mm (6.1 in) howitzer gun
- T5-52: Turret with a Denel 155mm Howitzer Gun 155 mm (6.1 in) truck-mounted howitzer gun
- MCT 60 Mortar: Turret with a M10 Mortar 60 mm (2.4 in) mortar
- MCT Missile: Turret with two Ingwe ATGM launchers
- Vektor GA-1: 20 mm × 82 mm (0.79 in × 3.23 in) gun for turrets
- Denel GI-2 20 mm × 139 mm (0.79 in × 5.47 in) gun for turrets or naval applications
- Denel GI 30: 30 mm (1.2 in) gun for turrets
- Denel 35mm Dual Purpose Gun: 35 mm (1.4 in) naval gun close-in weapons system
- Denel GT1: 20 Pounder, 84 mm gun rebranded for South African use by Denel for turrets, most prominently used on the Skokiaan and Olifant
- Denel GT2: 90 mm gun made for light turrets, most prominently used on the Eland and Ratel
- Denel GT3: 105 mm gun rebranded from the L7 british tank gun for use on tank turrets, most prominently used on the Olifant
- Denel GT4: 76 mm (3.0 in) rifled gun for turrets based of the OTO Melara 76, most prominently used on the Rooikat
- Denel GT6: 120 mm gun with modular ability to switch from 120 mm to 140 mm made for heavy Main Battle tanks, planned to have been used on the Tank Technology Demonstrator
- Denel GT7: 105 mm (4.1 in) light gun for turrets, most prominently used on the Rooikat 105
- Denel GT8: 105 mm gun made to replace the GT-3 for tank turrets, most prominently used on the Olifant Mk.1B Optimum
- Denel GT9: 120 mm gun made for light turrets
- Denel GT12: 120 mm low recoil gun made for use on light turrets
- Denel 155mm Howitzer Gun: 155 mm (6.1 in) heavy gun for turrets

=== Mortar systems ===
- M10 Mortar: 60 mm (2.4 in) mortar for turrets
- M4 60: 60 mm (2.4 in) commando mortar
- M6 60: 60 mm (2.4 in) mortar
- M8 81: 81 mm (3.2 in) mortar

=== Small arms ===
- Vektor SP1: 9 mm (0.35 in) semi-automatic pistol
- Vektor R1/R2/R3: 7.62 mm (0.300 in) battle rifle
- Vektor R4/R5/R6: 5.56 mm (0.219 in) assault rifle
- Vektor CR-21: 5.56 mm (0.219 in) bullpup assault rifle (prototype only)
- Vektor Mini-SS: 5.56 mm (0.219 in) light machine gun
- Vektor Mini-SS Compact: 5.56 mm (0.219 in) compact light machine gun
- Vektor SS-77: 7.62 mm (0.300 in) medium machine gun
- Vektor DMG-5: 7.62 mm (0.300 in) medium machine gun
- Denel NTW-20: 14.5 mm × 114 mm (0.57 in × 4.49 in), 20 mm × 82 mm (0.79 in × 3.23 in), & 20 mm × 110 mm (0.79 in × 4.33 in) anti-materiel rifle
- Denel Y3 AGL: 40 mm × 53 mm (1.6 in × 2.1 in) automatic grenade launcher
- Denel MG4: 7.62 mm light machine gun, licensed copy of the American Browning M1919
