= G6 howitzer =

South African 155 mm self-propelled artillery

G6
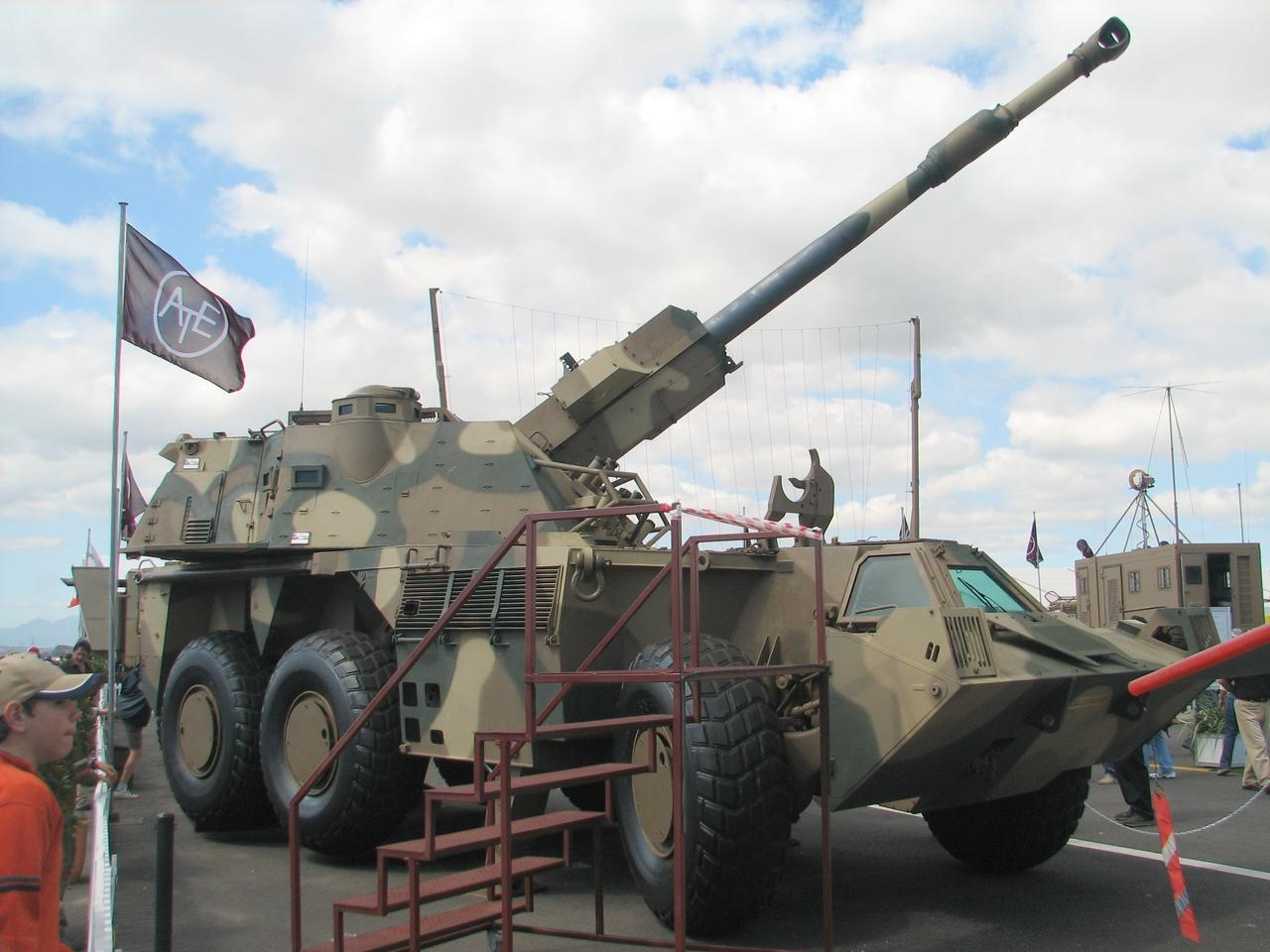
- G6 howitzer parked at Air Force Base Ysterplaat in 2006
- Type: Self-propelled artillery
- Place of origin: South Africa

Service history
- Used by: See Operators
- Wars: South African Border War; Yemeni Civil War (2015–present)

Production history
- Designer: Lyttelton Engineering Works
- Designed: 1981
- Manufacturer: Denel Land Systems (turret); Land Systems OMC (chassis)
- Unit cost: USD $3,272,000 (new)
- Produced: 1988–1999
- No. built: 154
- Variants: See Variants

Specifications
- Mass: 46 tonnes (51 short tons; 45 long tons)
- Length: 9.20 m (30 ft 2 in) (hull)
- Width: 3.40 m (11 ft 2 in)
- Height: 3.20 m (10 ft 6 in)
- Crew: 6
- Main armament: 155mm G5 howitzer (47 rounds)
- Secondary armament: 12.7mm M2 Browning machine gun (900 rounds)
- Engine: Magirus Deutz Model FL 413 F/FR air-cooled diesel 525 hp (391 kW)
- Power/weight: 11.17hp /tonne (8.7 kW/tonne)
- Suspension: Torsion bar with hydraulic shock dampers
- Ground clearance: 0.45 m (1 ft 6 in)
- Fuel capacity: 700 litres
- Operational range: 700 km
- Maximum speed: 90 km/h (55 mph)

The G6, sometimes denoted as the G6 Rhino, is a South African self-propelled howitzer. It was developed as a turreted, self-propelled variant of the G5 howitzer series, mating the gun to a six-wheeled mine-protected armoured chassis. Design work on the G6 began in the late 1970s to replace the obsolescent Sexton being retired from service with the artillery regiments of the South African Army. Serial production commenced between 1988 and 1999.

At the time of its introduction, the G6 was considered one of the most mobile self-propelled howitzers in service. Its chassis was engineered to be mine-resistant and blastproof, allowing it to survive multiple TM-46 detonations during trials. The G6 was conceived as a wheeled rather than a tracked vehicle for this purpose, as well as to allow it to deploy long distances by road without consuming excessive quantities of fuel or requiring a tank transporter.

G6s entered service during the last two years of the South African Border War, frequently shelling positions held by the People's Armed Forces for the Liberation of Angola (FAPLA) during the Battle of Cuito Cuanavale. Their ability to bombard a target and change positions rapidly in less than two minutes, with minimal preparation, greatly reduced the threat posed by retaliatory Angolan air raids and counter-battery fire. A number of G6s were subsequently manufactured for export and purchased by Abu Dhabi and Oman. Export models included a specialist anti-aircraft variant with a GEC-Marconi Marksman turret and twin-barrelled 35mm autocannon.

Chile briefly produced the G6 under licence as the CC-SP-45, although this arrangement was later terminated after the system was not adopted by that country's armed forces. Iraq also manufactured its own domestic variant of the G6 as the Al Majnoon with technical assistance from Canadian artillery engineer Gerald Bull, which later evolved into the much larger and more sophisticated Al Fao.

== Ammunition characteristics ==
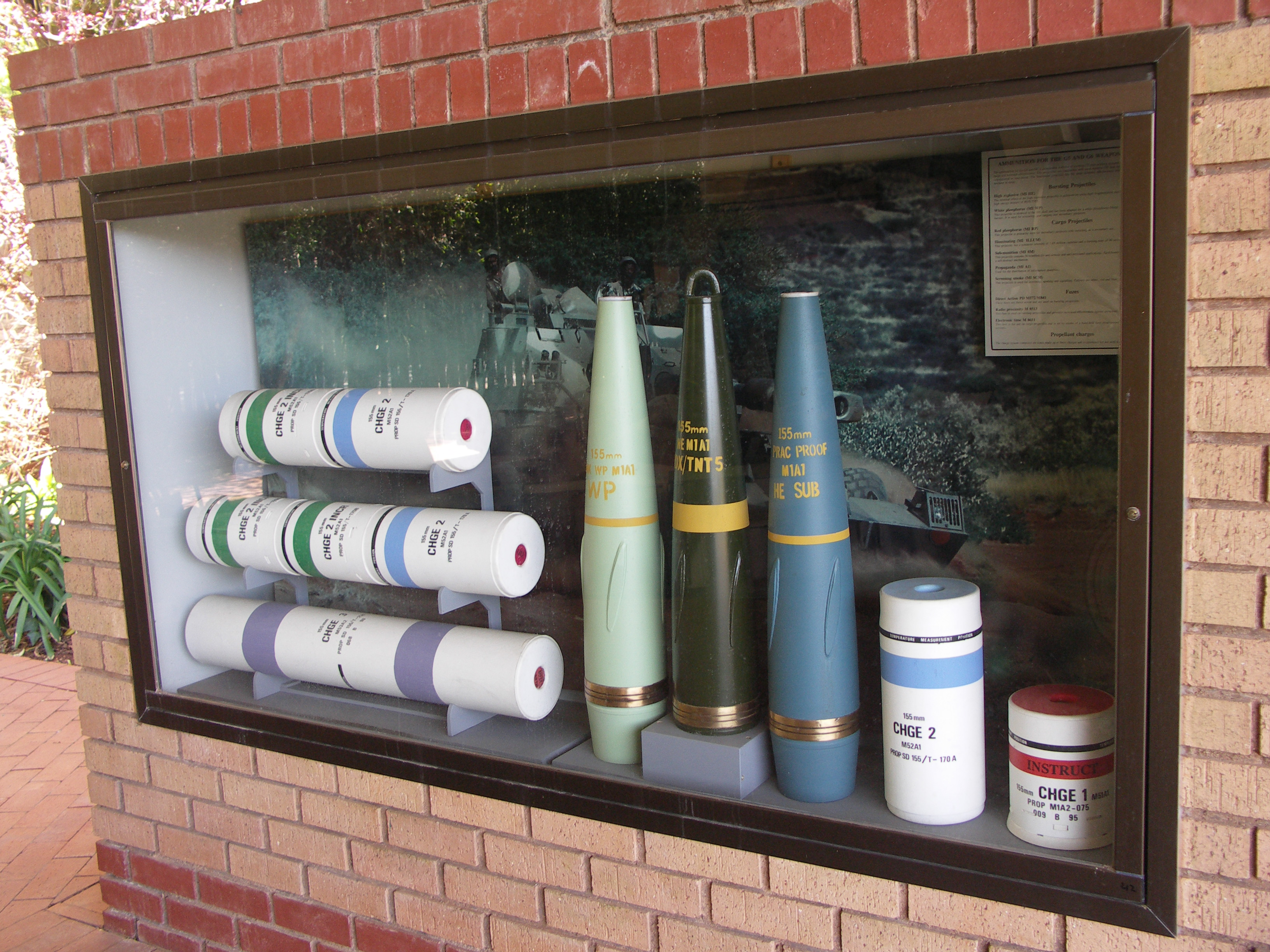
G5/G6 ammunition

- Maximum range:
  - 30,000 m with standard HE rounds,
  - 39,000 m with HE base bleed rounds, and
  - 42,000 m with HE base bleed rounds (BB—fired from G6-52)
  - 50,000 m with HE base bleed rounds (BB—fired from G6-52 extended range)
  - 52,500 m with a special velocity-enhanced long range projectile (V-LAP—fired from G6).
  - 58,000 m with a special velocity-enhanced long range projectile (V-LAP—fired from G6-52).
  - 67,450 m M9703A1 V-LAP round (tested successfully to 73,000 m by Denel in G6-52 extended range platform)
  - 76,280 m M9703 Practice Inert V-LAP
- Minimum range: 3,000 m.
- Rate of fire: 4 round/min, 2 round/min sustained.
- Ammunition: 155 mm ERFB. 47 rounds, 50 charges, 64 primers and fuzes
- Accuracy: 0.1% of range in azimuth, 0.48% of range in range
- In 2012 four rounds of M982 Excalibur precision guided munitions were fired to a range of 38 km, all landing within 5 m of the target.

== Proposed variants ==
=== G6-HVM ===
The G6-HVM was meant to be a SAM Version of the G6 Howitzer that was meant to be fitted with the SAHV-3 Missile launcher system, it was an attempt of resurrecting the SAHV missile after the ZA-HVM failed but it never got past wooden mockup, the SAHV-3 Missile would later be the precursor to the Umkhonto SAM.

== Variants ==
- G6
- G6 M1A3: exported UAE version
- G6-52 (23 litre chamber)
- G6-52 extended range (25 litre chamber)
- Al-Majnoon: licensed Iraqi version
- G6 Marksman: a British SPAAG version, combining the G6's base vehicle with the Marksman turret, equipped 2x35mm Oerlikon Autocannons.

| Variant | Description | Image |
|---|---|---|
| G6 | Original Version, gets a 155mm Howitzer | SADF G6 |
| Al Fao/Al-Majnoon | Upgraded Iraqi version, Al-Fao has a 210 mm (8.3 in) gun while the Al-Majnoon has a normal 155 mm gun | Iraqi Al Fao Howitzer |
| G6 Marksman | Version with a British SPAAG Marksman turret | SADF G6 Marksman |

== Operators ==
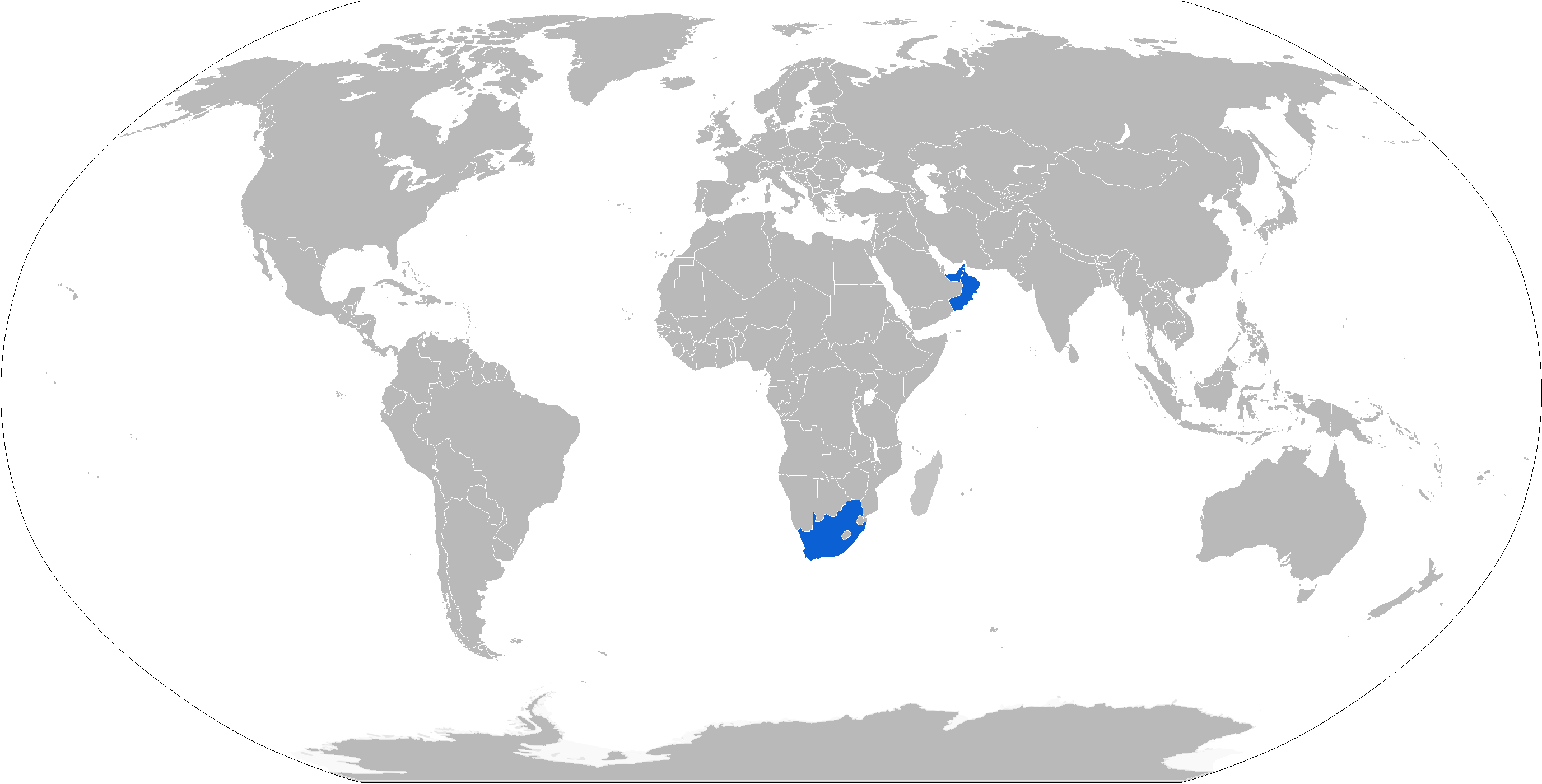
Map of G6 operators in blue

- South Africa: 43 systems; two are constantly used for training, the rest are in storage Also known as the GV6 Rhino within the South African National Defence Force.
- United Arab Emirates: 78 systems in service as of 2024.
- Oman: 24 systems in service as of 2024.

== Combat history ==
The first G6 prototype appeared in 1981, during the height of the South African Border War. Four engineering development models were being tested with the South African Defence Force by the mid-1980s. In October 1987, the South African government ordered all the G6s deployed to Angola for combat trials as part of Operation Hooper. One suffered an engine failure, so only three actually reached Angola, where they joined expeditionary troops of the 4 South African Infantry Battalion. Operating as an independent battery, the three G6s were instrumental in the bombardment of the strategic Angolan airfield at Cuito Cuanavale. In this their crews were significantly aided by South African special forces acting as forward artillery observers near the airfield; on one occasion the G6s were able to destroy four Angolan Mikoyan-Gurevich MiG-21s on the ground as they attempted to take off.

The heightened artillery threat to the Cuito Cuanavale airfield eventually forced the Angolan pilots to relocate their operations to another airstrip at Menongue, which was beyond the range of the G5 and G6 but severely diminished their ability to time and execute their missions, given Menongue's distance from the actual fighting. However, they also began making South African artillery positions the primary targets of their raids, forcing the G6 crews to constantly shift positions after each bombardment. The G6s themselves were considered so valuable that an air defence contingent from South Africa's 10 Anti-Aircraft Regiment was subsequently attached to the battery for the remainder of the campaign.

The G6 is not known to have seen combat again until 2015, when a single battery was deployed with the United Arab Emirates Defence Force to Aden during the Yemeni Crisis. The howitzers were landed in Aden by ship and escorted by a large Emirati armoured formation. They have since been used to shell Houthi militant positions in support of Emirati and allied Yemeni offensives carried out near Taiz.

== Gallery ==
DENEL G6-52 Self-propelled Howitzer

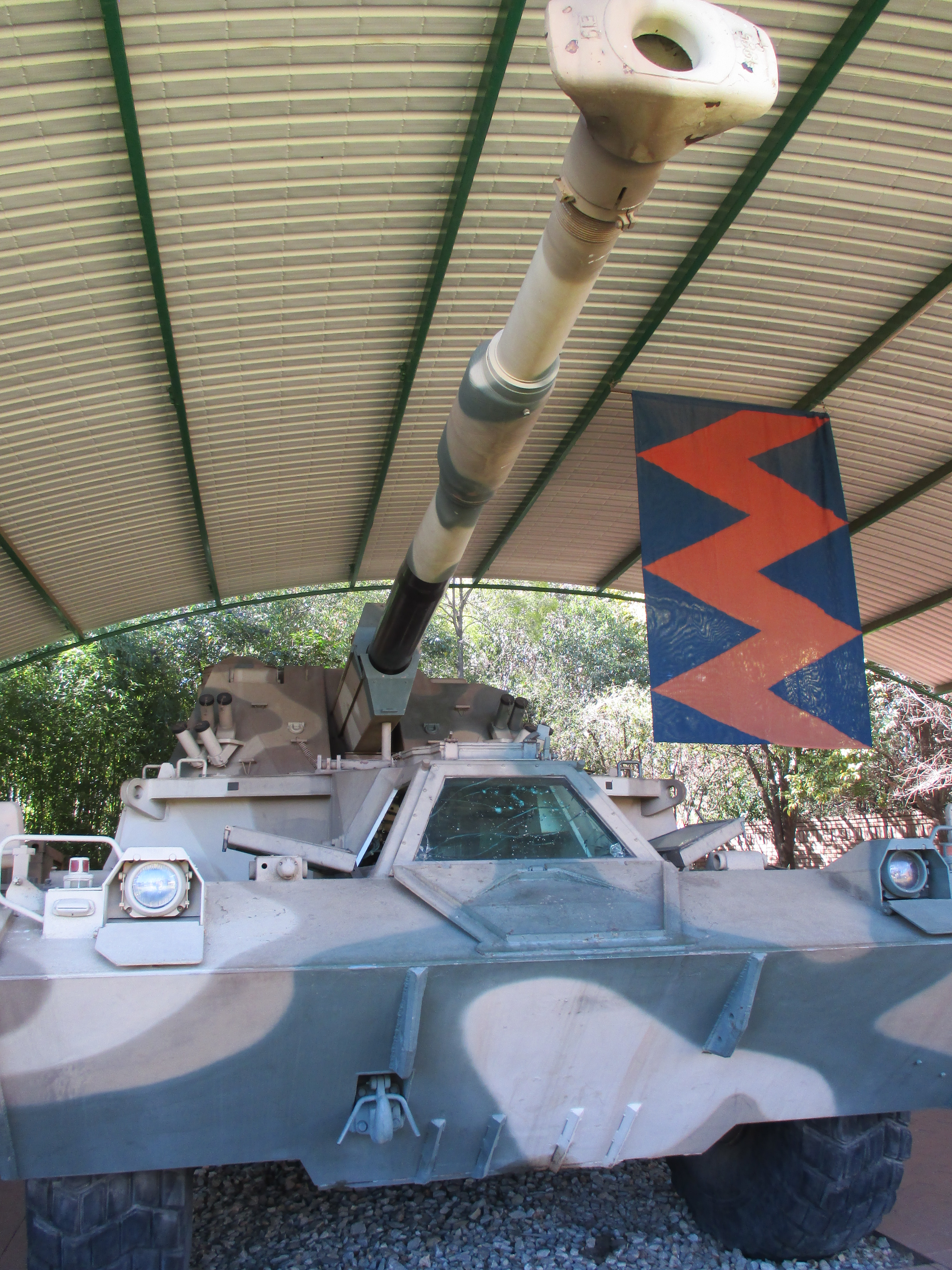

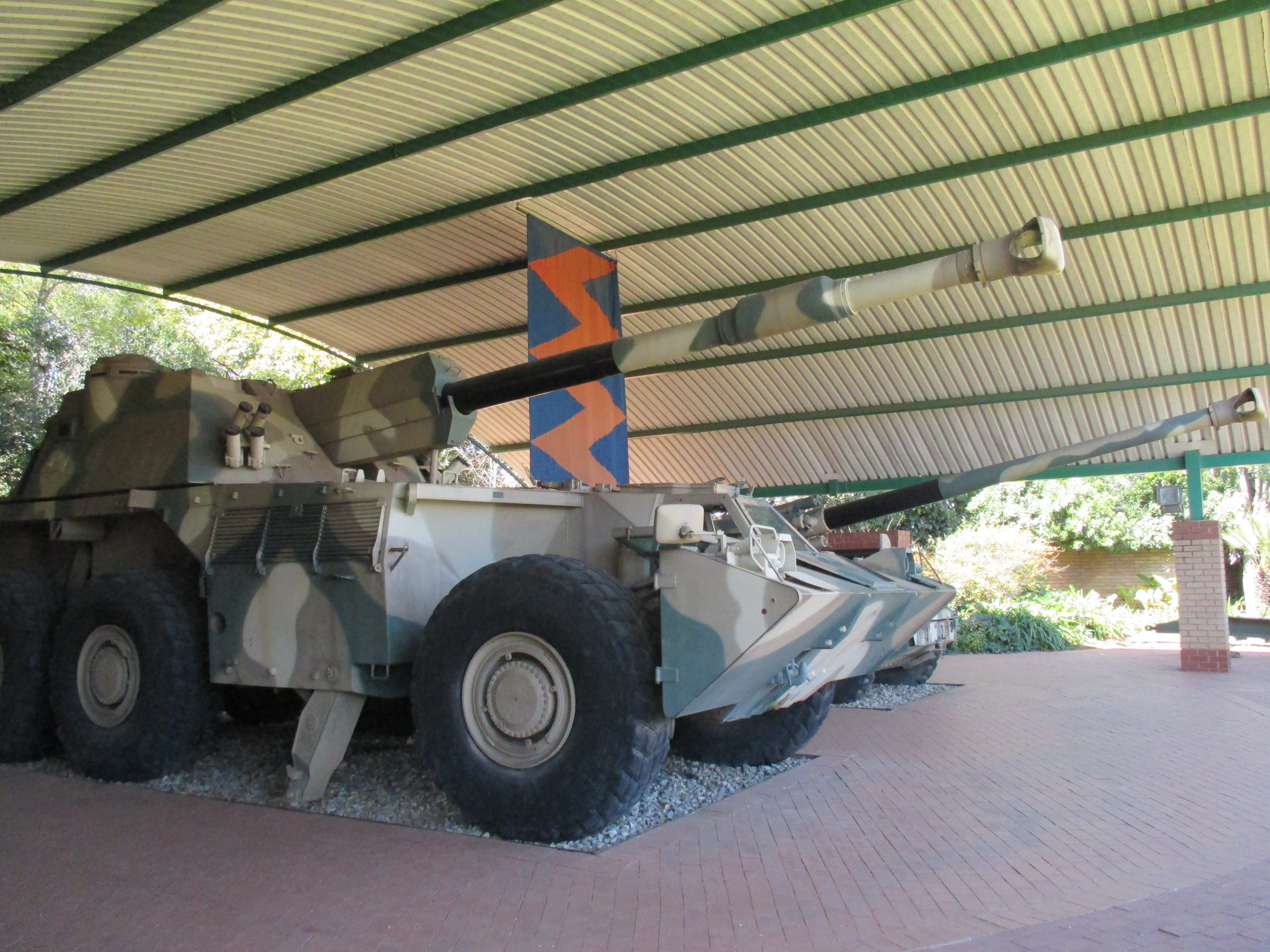

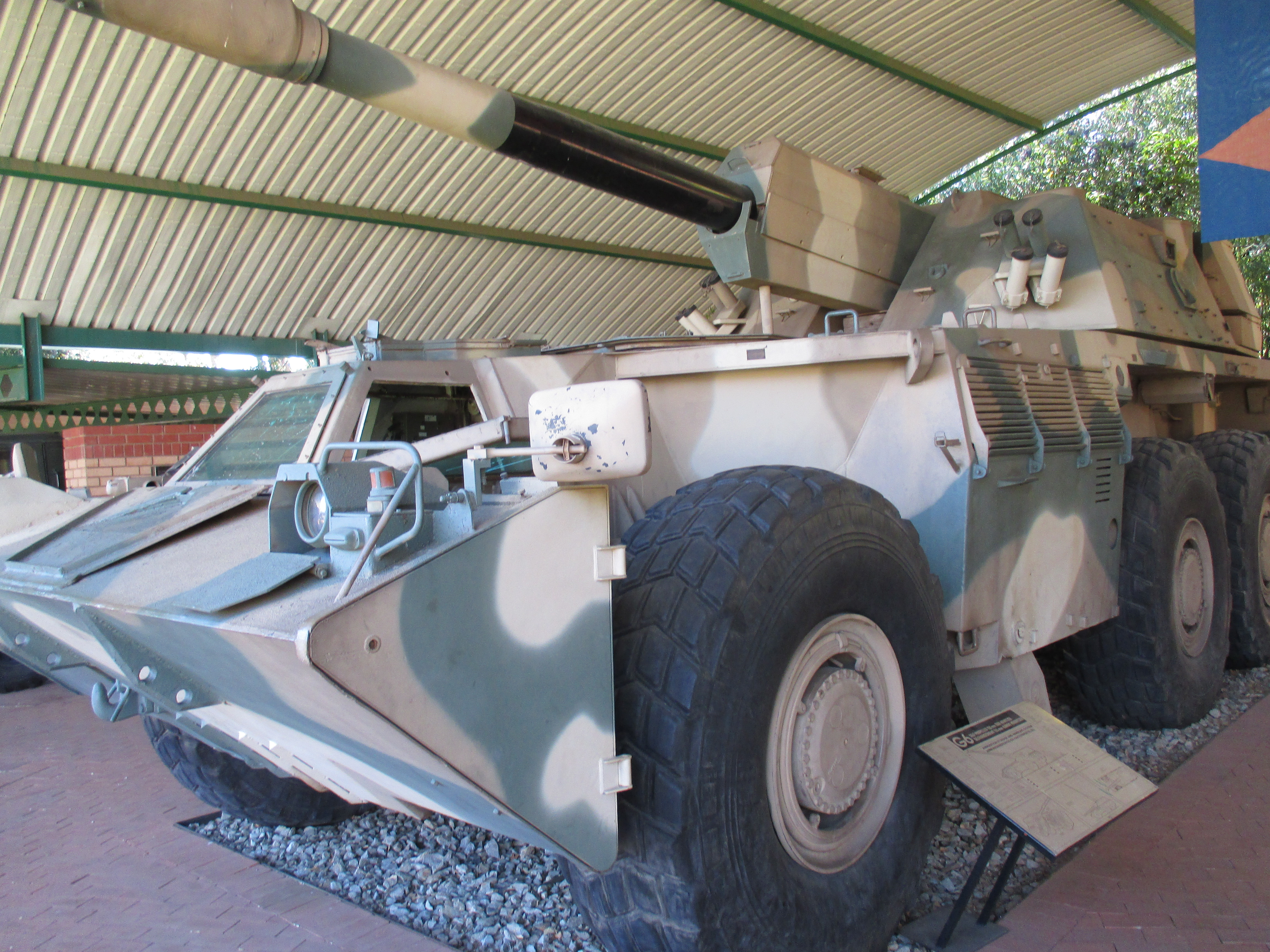

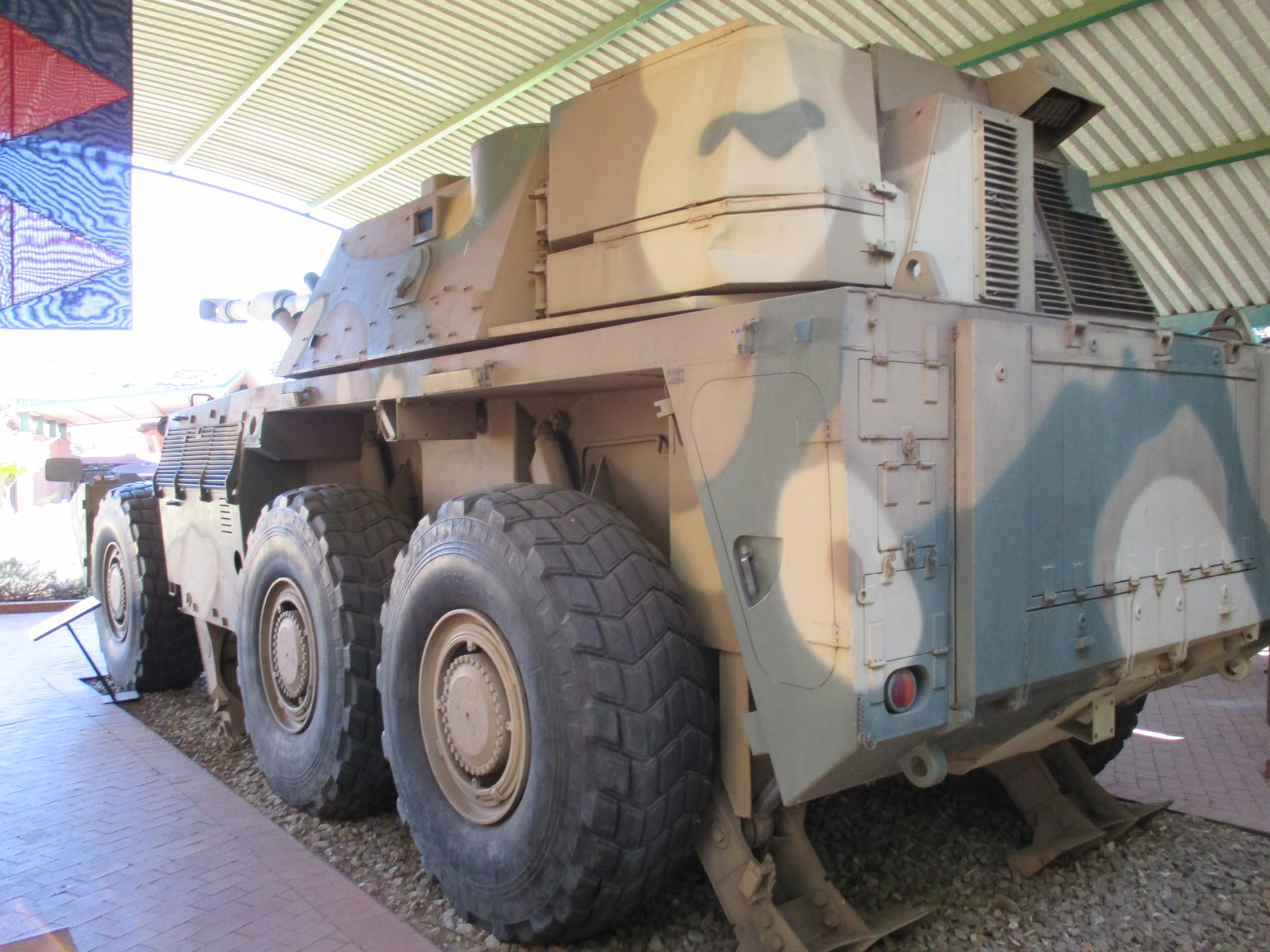

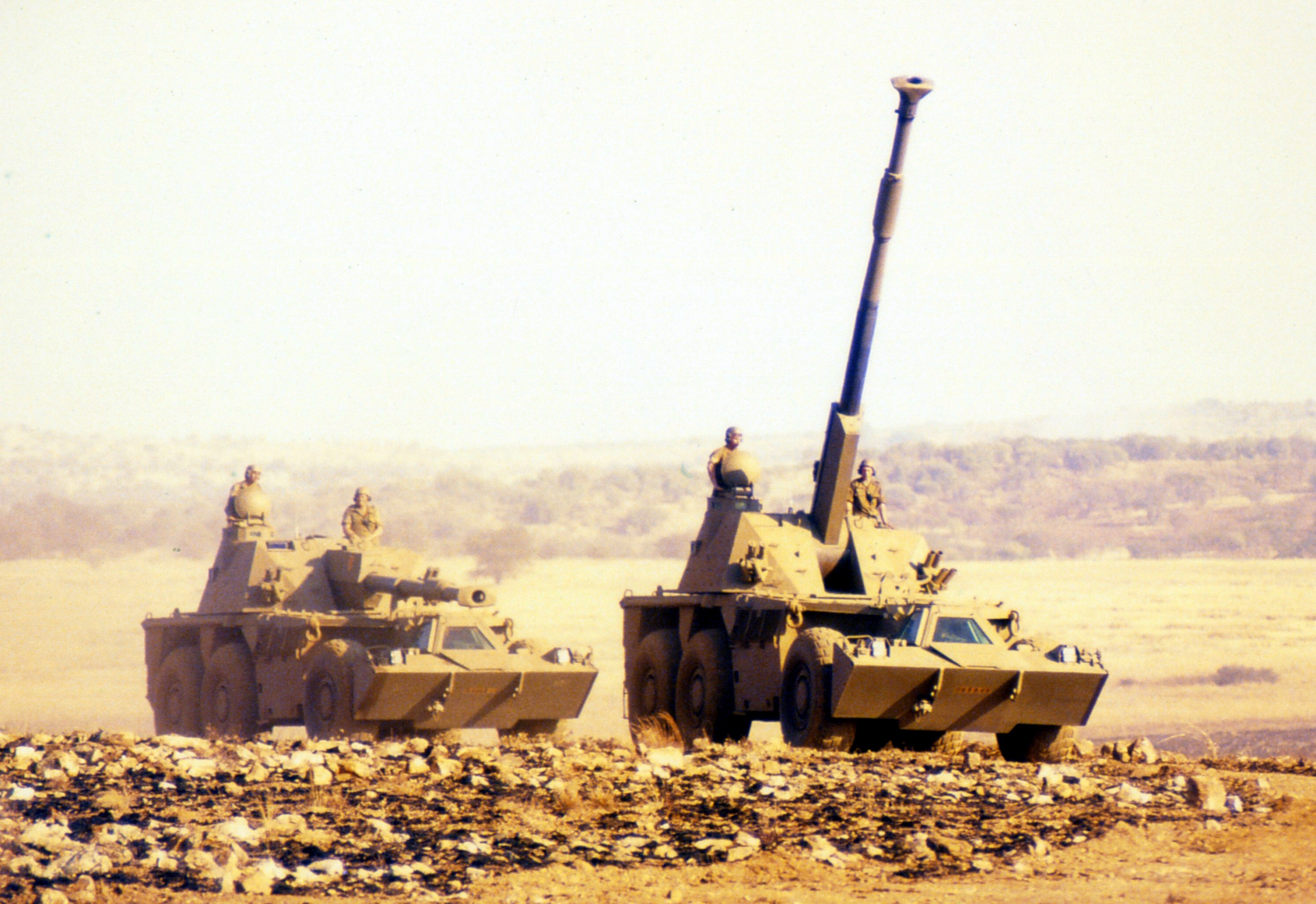

== See also ==
- Al-Fao – (Iraq)
- Archer – (Sweden)
- DRDO ATAGS – (India)
- ATMOS 2000 – (Israel)
- A-222 Bereg – (Russia)
- 2S22 Bohdana – (Ukraine)
- CAESAR – (France)
- DANA – (Czechoslovakia)
- AHS Kryl – (Poland)
- Nora B-52 – (Serbia)
- PCL-09 – (China)
- PCL-161 – (China)
- PCL-181 – (China)
- PLL-09 – (China)
- Type 19 – (Japan)
- ZUZANA – (Slovakia)
