= Type 96 24 cm howitzer =

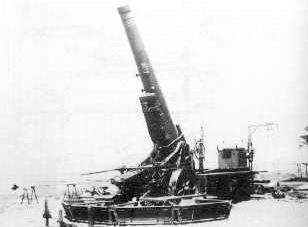
- Type: Siege gun
- Place of origin: Empire of Japan

Service history
- Used by: Imperial Japanese Army
- Wars: World War II

Production history
- Unit cost: 247,000 yen ($66,369 USD) in August 1939
- Produced: 1936-1945
- No. built: 6 or 7

Specifications
- Mass: 37.6 t (37.0 long tons; 41.4 short tons)
- Barrel length: 5.7 m (19 ft) L/24
- Shell weight: 185–200 kg (408–441 lb)
- Caliber: 240 mm (9.4 in)
- Breech: Interrupted screw
- Recoil: Hydro-pneumatic
- Carriage: Split trail
- Elevation: 0° to +65°
- Traverse: -/+ 120°
- Muzzle velocity: 530 m/s (1,700 ft/s)
- Maximum firing range: 13.5–16 km (8.4–9.9 mi)

The Type 96 24 cm howitzer (Japanese: 九六式二十四糎榴弾砲, Kyūroku -shiki nijūyon-senchi ryūdanhō) was a siege gun used by the Imperial Japanese Army in the Japanese-Soviet War and during the Pacific War from 1936 to 1945. The designation Type 96 indicates the year of its introduction, Kōki year 2596 or 1936 according to Gregorian calendar.

== History ==
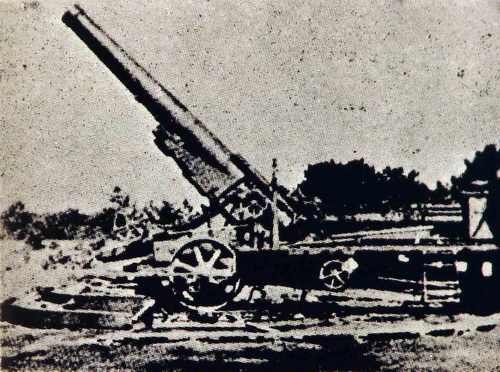

Since the successful Siege of Port Arthur, during the Russo-Japanese War heavy howitzer development had taken high priority. The Imperial Japanese Army's Armstrong designed 28 cm howitzer L/10 had been instrumental in destroying Port Arthur's defenses and sinking the fleet anchored in its harbor. This resulted in the development of several siege guns, which could be also be used as siege and coastal defense guns. The first was the Type 45 24 cm Howitzer which weighed 38 t (37 long tons; 42 short tons) and required a crew of 50 men two days to set up. The second was the Type 7 30 cm howitzer which was introduced in 1918. The short barreled version weighed 59 t (58 long tons; 65 short tons) while the long barreled version weighed 97 t (95 long tons; 107 short tons). Although both were powerful weapons their weight was considered excessive and this negatively affected their mobility. Although satisfied with both designs two new guns were ordered during 1936, the Type 96 15 cm howitzer and the Type 96 24 cm howitzer. Both were lighter and more mobile than their predecessors but while the Type 96 15 cm was successful the Type 96 24 cm was a failure due to excessive shot dispersion and inconsistent range which were never resolved. Therefore only eight Type 96 24 cm howitzers were built. For transport, the Type 96 24 cm howitzer, could be broken down into four loads and towed by tractors. Once onsite, a turntable was assembled and firmly anchored to the ground. The gun was then mounted on the turntable and had 120° of traverse and +65° of elevation.

=== Pacific War ===
The Type 96 first saw action during the Philippines Campaign in 1942, when the US-Philippine forces withdrew to the Bataan Peninsula. The first Japanese attacks failed due to stiff Allied resistance so the Commander-in-Chief of the 14th Army, Lieutenant-General Masaharu Homma brought up heavy artillery units to prepare for renewed attacks. Among the 300 guns deployed were two Type 96 howitzers of the 2nd Independent Heavy Artillery Company. On April 3, 1942 the Japanese guns opened fire at 9AM and continued until 2PM. In the six-hour bombardment, 80 rounds were fired by the 2nd Independent Heavy Artillery Company. On May 4, 1942, the Japanese began bombarding the island fortress of Corregidor. During the course of the bombardment Type 96 and Type 45 24 cm howitzers fired a total of 2,915 rounds. Corregidor eventually fell on May 6, 1942.

=== Japanese-Soviet War ===
In 1945, Type 96 howitzers were moved to Manchuria Kotō Fortress to strengthen the Japanese defense in preparation for a Soviet attack. The Japanese army had built eight fortresses along the border with the Soviet Union, of which the Kotō fortress on the Ussuri River was the strongest. Large-scale fortifications, similar to the Maginot Line, were guarded by the 4th Border Guard Unit. The 1400-strong crew had two batteries of field guns and howitzers, the Type 90 240 mm railway gun, and the Experimental 41-cm Howitzer. When the Red Army attacked the Japanese positions around Kotō fortress in Operation August Storm in August 1945, the crew was annihilated.
