= Mortaio da 210/9 modello 1914 =

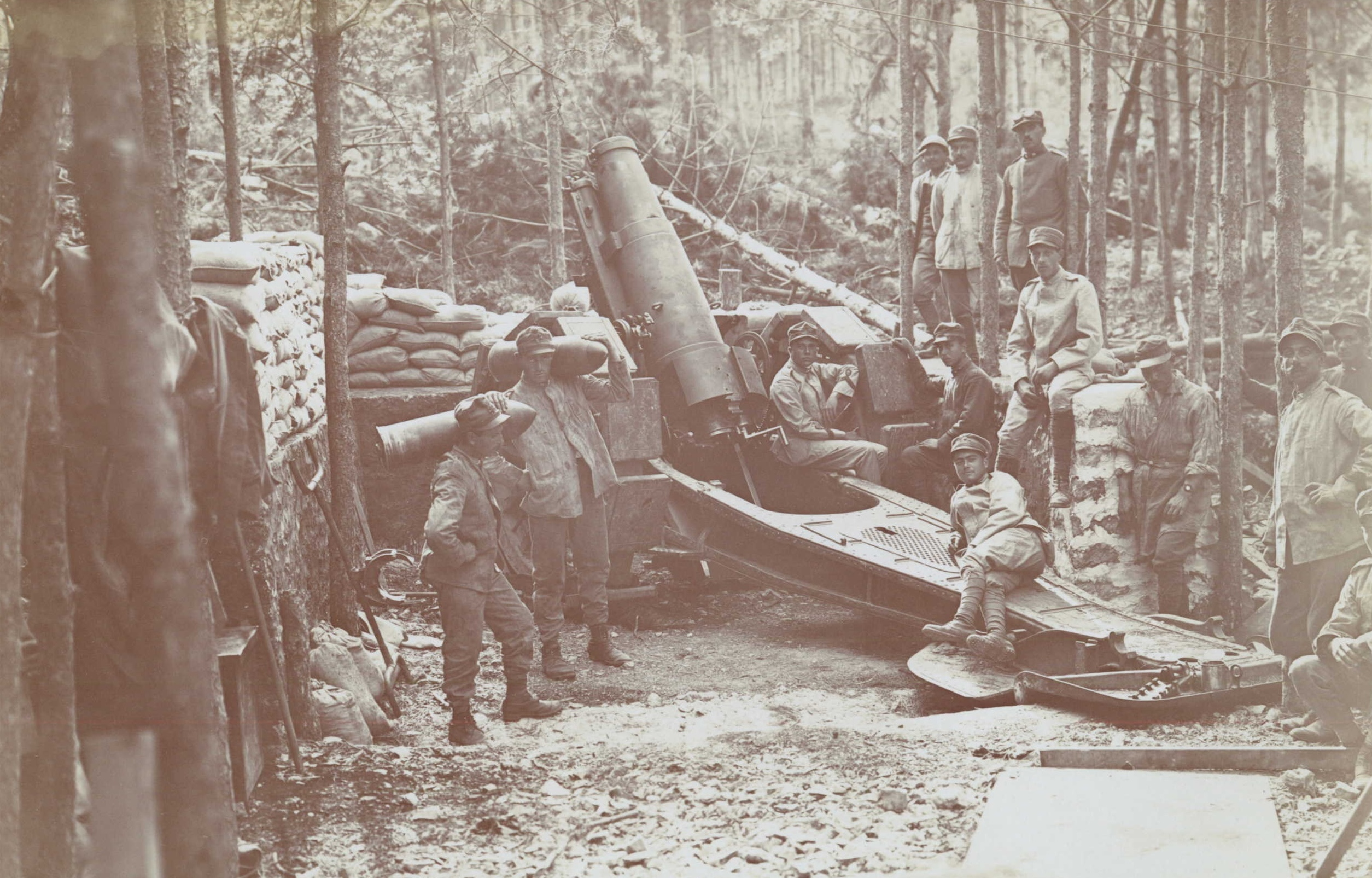
- Mortaio da 210/9 modello 1914
- Type: Heavy Mortar; Howitzer; Siege gun
- Place of origin: France

Service history
- In service: 1914−?
- Used by: Kingdom of Italy
- Wars: First World War

Production history
- Designer: Schneider
- Designed: 1910
- Manufacturer: Ansaldo

Specifications
- Mass: 7,180 kg (15,830 lb)
- Barrel length: 2.03 m (6 ft 8 in) L/9.7
- Width: 2 m (6 ft 7 in)
- Height: 1.52 m (5 ft)
- Shell: Cased separate-loading
- Shell weight: 102 kg (225 lb)
- Caliber: 210 mm (8.3 in)
- Breech: Interrupted screw
- Recoil: Hydro-pneumatic
- Carriage: Box trail
- Elevation: 0° to +65°
- Traverse: 6°
- Muzzle velocity: 347 m/s (1,140 ft/s)
- Maximum firing range: 9 km (6 mi)

The Mortaio da 210/9 modello 1914 was an Italian Heavy Mortar designed by the French Schneider Company and produced under license in Italy by Ansaldo for the Italian Army and used during the First World War.

== History ==
After the independence and unification of Italy, the Italians were not self-sufficient in arms design and production. Foreign firms such as Armstrong, Krupp, Schneider, and Vickers all provided arms and helped establish local production of their designs under license.

Although the majority of combatants had heavy field artillery before the outbreak of the First World War, none had adequate numbers of heavy guns in service, nor had they foreseen the growing importance of heavy artillery once the Italian Front stagnated and trench warfare set in. Fortresses, armories, coastal fortifications, and museums were scoured for heavy artillery and sent to the front. Suitable field and rail carriages were built for these guns to give their forces the heavy field artillery needed to overcome trenches and hardened concrete fortifications.

== Design ==
The Mortaio da 210/9 modello 1914 was a breechloading gun with a steel barrel, box trail carriage, two wooden spoked wheels with steel rims, gun shield, hydro-pneumatic recoil mechanism, a Schneider interrupted screw breech, and it fired cased separate-loading ammunition with up to eight bagged charges to vary velocity and range. The box trail carriage had a large hollow section near the breech to allow for high angle fire and like other large Schneider guns, there was an integrated loading tray attached to the breech. Its combat weight was 7,180 kg (15,830 lb) and for transport, it could be broken down into two wagon loads. The barrel could be removed and moved on its wagon load, while the second wagon load consisted of the carriage and a limber to support the tail of the carriage and towed by an artillery tractor.

To facilitate towing on soft ground and lessen recoil the wheels were often fitted with Bonagente grousers patented by the Italian major Crispino Bonagente. These consisted of twelve rectangular plates connected with elastic links and are visible in many photographs of World War I artillery from all of the combatants. On carriage, the traverse was only 6°. Although the Italian classification lists the mortar as being 9 calibers in length it is actually 9.7 calibers. The Italian classification system didn't count the breech length like most other countries. Schneider produced a range of medium and heavy artillery for export including 120 mm, 122 mm, 150 mm, 152 mm, 155 mm, 203 mm, 210 mm, 220 mm, and 260 mm guns that all used same basic pattern. They were classified as Mortars, Howitzers, or Siege Guns depending on the customers artillery classification system.

== Photo Gallery ==
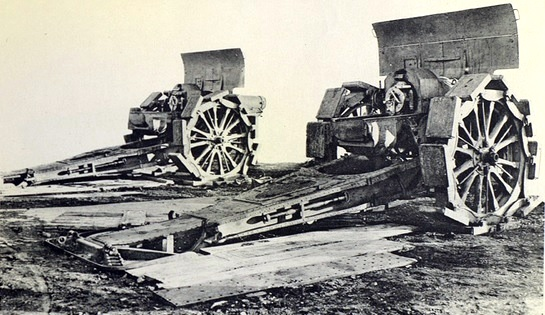
Two mortars with Bonagente grousers. A pit could be dug beneath the breech for high-angle fire.

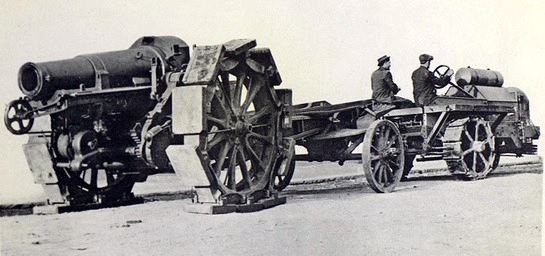
A mortar without a gun shield being towed.

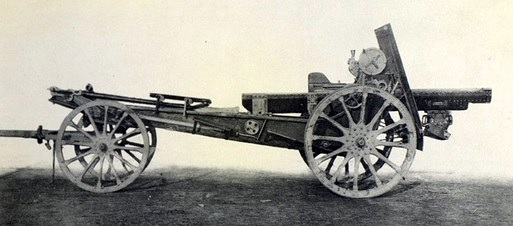
A carriage attached to a limber for transport.

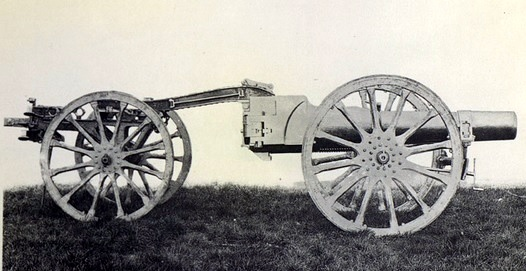
A barrel attached to a limber for transport.
