= Mortaio da 260/9 Modello 16 =

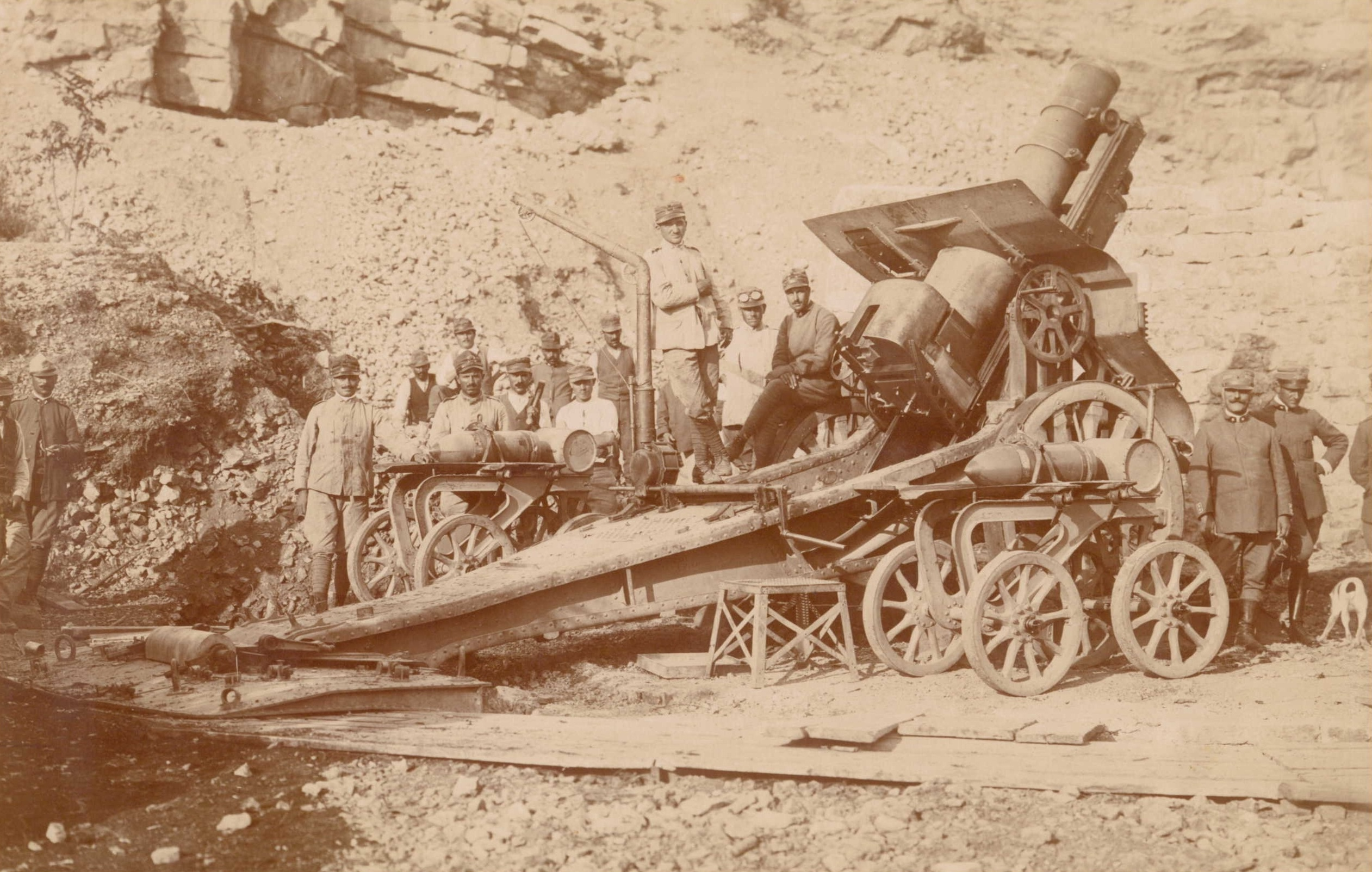
- A 260/9 mortar in firing position.
- Type: Heavy mortar Siege gun
- Place of origin: France

Service history
- In service: 1916–1945
- Used by: Kingdom of Italy; Spain
- Wars: First World War; Spanish Civil War; Second World War

Production history
- Designer: Schneider
- Designed: 1910
- Manufacturer: Ansaldo; Vickers-Terni
- Variants: Mortaio da 260/9 S

Specifications
- Mass: Travel: 12.56 t (12.36 long tons); Combat: 11.83 t (11.64 long tons); Barrel only: 4.17 t (4.10 long tons)
- Length: 5.6 m (18 ft 4 in)
- Barrel length: 2.73 m (8 ft 11 in) L/9
- Width: 2.18 m (7 ft 2 in)
- Shell: Cased separate-loading
- Shell weight: 215–223 kg (474–492 lb)
- Caliber: 260 mm (10 in)
- Breech: Interrupted screw
- Recoil: Hydro-pneumatic
- Carriage: Box trail
- Elevation: +20° to +65°
- Traverse: 12°
- Rate of fire: Sustained: 1 round every 12 minutes Maximum: 2 rounds every 4 minutes
- Muzzle velocity: 350 m/s (1,100 ft/s)
- Effective firing range: 9.1 km (6 mi)

The Mortaio da 260/9 Modello 16 - was an Italian Heavy mortar and Siege Gun designed by the French Schneider Company and produced under license in Italy by Ansaldo and Vickers-Terni for the Italian Army. It was used by the Italian Army during both the First World War and Second World War.

== History ==
After the independence and unification of Italy, the Italians were not self-sufficient in arms design and production. Foreign firms such as Armstrong, Krupp, Schneider, and Vickers all provided arms and helped establish local production of their designs under license.

Although the majority of combatants had heavy field artillery prior to the outbreak of the First World War, none had adequate numbers of heavy guns in service, nor had they foreseen the growing importance of heavy artillery once the Italian Front stagnated and trench warfare set in. Fortresses, armories, coastal fortifications, and museums were scoured for heavy artillery and sent to the front. Suitable field and rail carriages were built for these guns in an effort to give their forces the heavy field artillery needed to overcome trenches and hardened concrete fortifications.

== Design ==
- Mortaio da 260/9 S - The original Schneider design supplied to the Italian Army. It had a steel box trail carriage, a recoil spade, two wooden spoked wheels with steel rims, a gun shield, a hydro-pneumatic recoil mechanism, a Schneider interrupted screw breech. It fired cased separate-loading ammunition with up to eight bagged charges to vary velocity and range. The box trail carriage had a large hollow section near the breech to allow for high angle fire and like other large Schneider guns, there was an integrated loading tray attached to the breech. Its combat weight was 12,147 kg (26,780 lb) and for transport, it could be broken down into two wagon loads. The barrel could be removed and moved on its own 5,660 kg (12,480 lb) wagon load, while the second 6,970 kg (15,370 lb) wagon load consisted of the carriage and a limber to support the tail of the carriage. On carriage, traverse was only 6°. Although the Italian classification lists the mortar as being 9 calibers in length it is actually 10.5 calibers. The Italian classification system didn't count the breech length like most other countries.
- Mortaio da 260/9 Modello 16 - A simplified design built in Italy in 1916. The gun barrel was the same, but in action the wheels were removed and the carriage formed a firing platform. The mortar could be transported in one piece and a detachable set of wooden spoked wheels with steel rims could be attached to the front of the carriage. The barrel could then be retracted rearward and laid on top of the trail for transport. The tail of the carriage was then supported by a limber for towing. Towing speed was 6–8 km/h (3.7–5.0 mph) and set up time was 24 hours. On carriage traverse was increased to 12°, but performance stayed the same. The German classification was 26 cm Mrs 582(i).

== Organization ==
A mortar battery is composed of:

- 4 mortars
- 4 trailers
- 2 machine guns
- 1 utility cart
- 4 trucks

== Photo Gallery ==
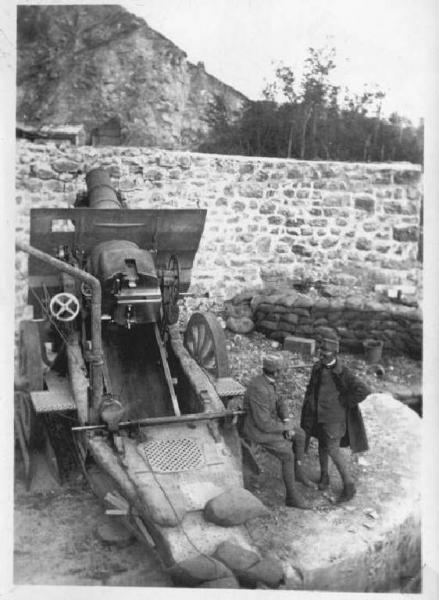
A 260/9 in Italian service.

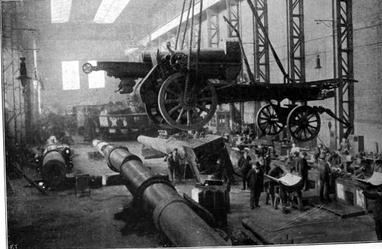
A 260/9 at the factory.

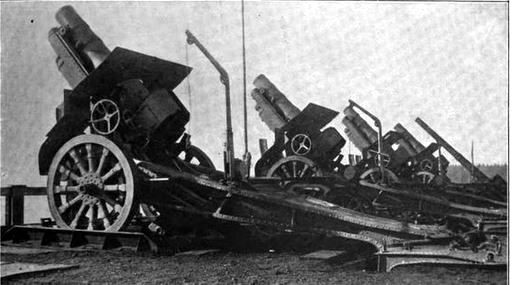
A battery of 260/9's.

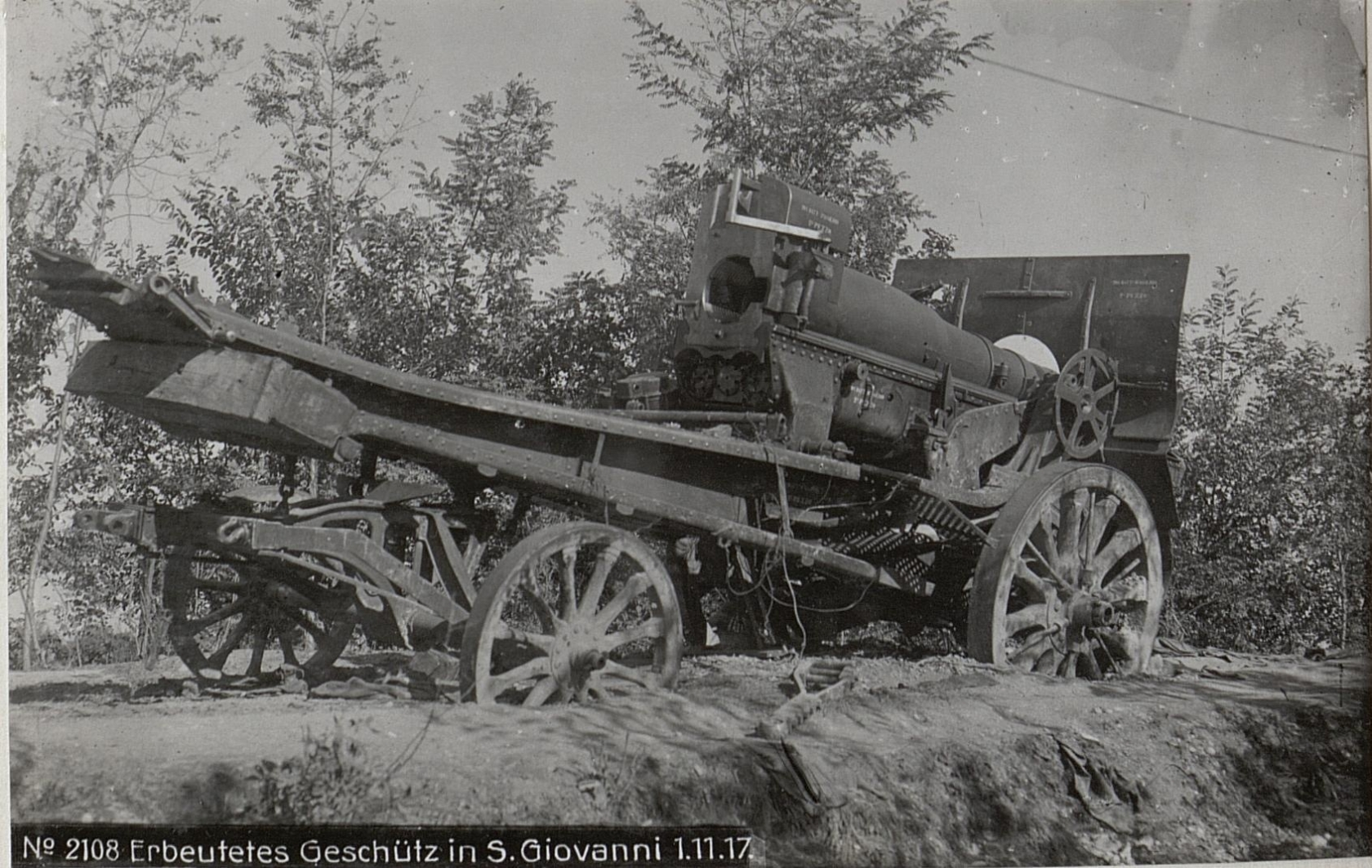
A 260/9 captured by Austro-Hungarian forces.

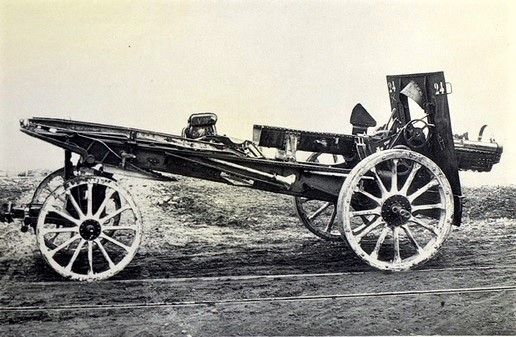
A carriage with limber broken down for transport.

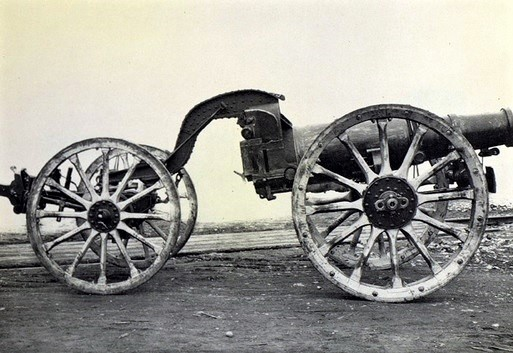
A barrel with limber ready for transport.

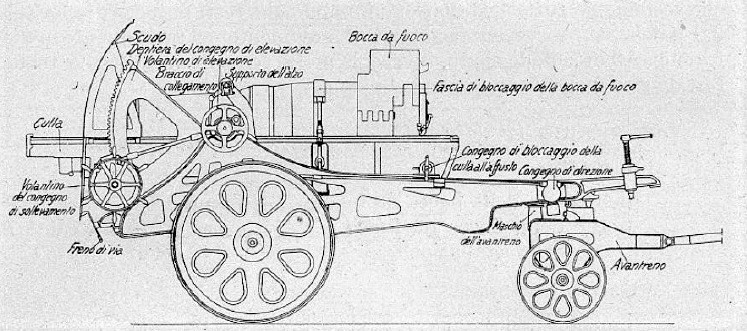
A 260/9 on its transport carriage.

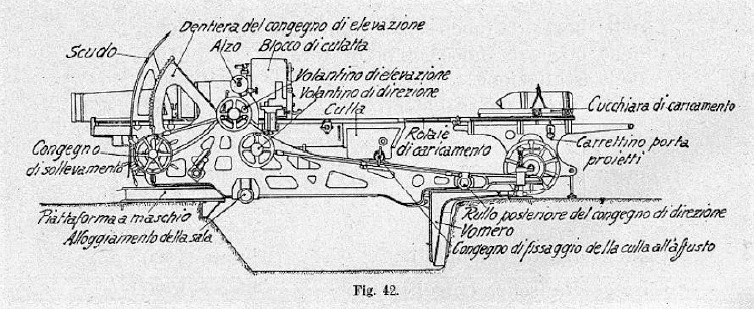
A 260/9 on its firing platform.
