= Type 96 15 cm cannon =

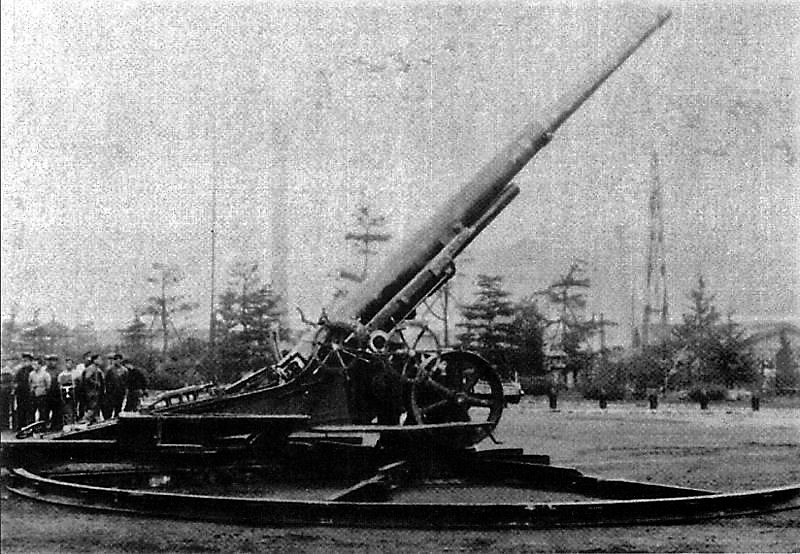
- A Type 96 on its turntable.
- Type: Field gun Siege gun
- Place of origin: Empire of Japan

Service history
- Used by: Imperial Japanese Army
- Wars: World War II

Production history
- Unit cost: 245,000 yen ($65,832 USD) in August 1939
- Produced: 1936–1945
- No. built: 30

Specifications
- Mass: 24.3 t (23.9 long tons; 26.8 short tons)
- Barrel length: 7.86 m (25 ft 9 in) L/52.7
- Shell: Separate loading cased charge and projectile
- Shell weight: 50 kg (110 lb)
- Caliber: 149.1 mm (5.87 in)
- Breech: Interrupted screw
- Recoil: Hydro-pneumatic
- Carriage: Box trail
- Elevation: -7° to +45°
- Traverse: -/+ 180°
- Rate of fire: 2 rpm
- Muzzle velocity: 860 m/s (2,800 ft/s)
- Maximum firing range: 26.2 km (16.3 mi)

The Type 96 15 cm cannon (Japanese: 九六式十五糎加農砲, Kyūroku-shiki jūgo-senchi Kannohō) was a siege gun used by the Imperial Japanese Army in the Japanese-Soviet War and during the Pacific War from 1936 to 1945. The designation Type 96 indicates the year of its introduction, Kōki year 2596 or 1936 according to Gregorian calendar.

== Design ==
The Type 96 was a built-up gun made from steel with an interrupted-screw breech which fired separate loading cased charge and projectiles. The barrel was trunnioned well to the rear to allow high angles of elevation and the preponderance of the barrel was supported by horizontal equilibrators. The Type 96 also had a hydro-pneumatic recoil system located between the barrel and cradle. All of this was supported on a two-wheeled box trail carriage. The carriage did not have any traverse but instead sat on top of a mobile turntable which could be assembled onsite in 4–5 hours which allowed 180° of traverse.

== History ==
The Type 96 evolved from the earlier Type 89 15 cm cannon field gun but with a longer barrel and a heavier carriage. Since the Japanese army had few field guns with a range in excess of 20 km (12 mi) the Type 96 was developed as a siege gun. Due to its weight 24.3 t (23.9 long tons; 26.8 short tons) mobility was a concern and this meant that the Type 96 was more often used as a fortress gun instead of a siege gun.

According to Bermudez Jr., the Type 96 may have influenced the development of the North Korean M-1978 Koksan gun: near the end of World War II, the Japanese Seventeenth Area Army controlled at least four coastal defence fortresses in the Korean peninsula.

=== Pacific War ===
During the Philippines Campaign in 1942, the US-Philippine forces withdrew first to the Bataan peninsula, then to the island fortress of Corregidor. The Type 96 first saw action on May 4, 1942, when two Type 96 guns participated in the bombardment of Corregidor. The two cannons of the 2nd Independent Heavy Artillery Battalion, along with two Type 89 15 cm guns of the same battalion, fired a total of 3,513 rounds. These guns were engaged mainly in a counter-battery role to neutralize the guns of the fortress. Corregidor later fell on May 6, 1942.

=== Japanese-Soviet War ===
Two Type 96s of the 1st Artillery Battalion of the 4th Border Guard Unit were moved to Manchuria to Kotō Fortress to strengthen the Japanese defense in preparation for a Soviet attack. The Japanese army had eight fortresses built along the border with the Soviet Union, of which the Kotō fortress on the Ussuri River was the strongest. Large-scale fortifications, similar to the Maginot Line, were guarded by the 4th Border Guard Unit. The 1400-strong crew had two batteries of field guns and howitzers, the Type 90 240 mm railway gun, and the Experimental 41-cm Howitzer. When the Red Army attacked the Japanese positions around Kotō fortress in Operation August Storm in August 1945, the crew was annihilated.

== Gallery ==
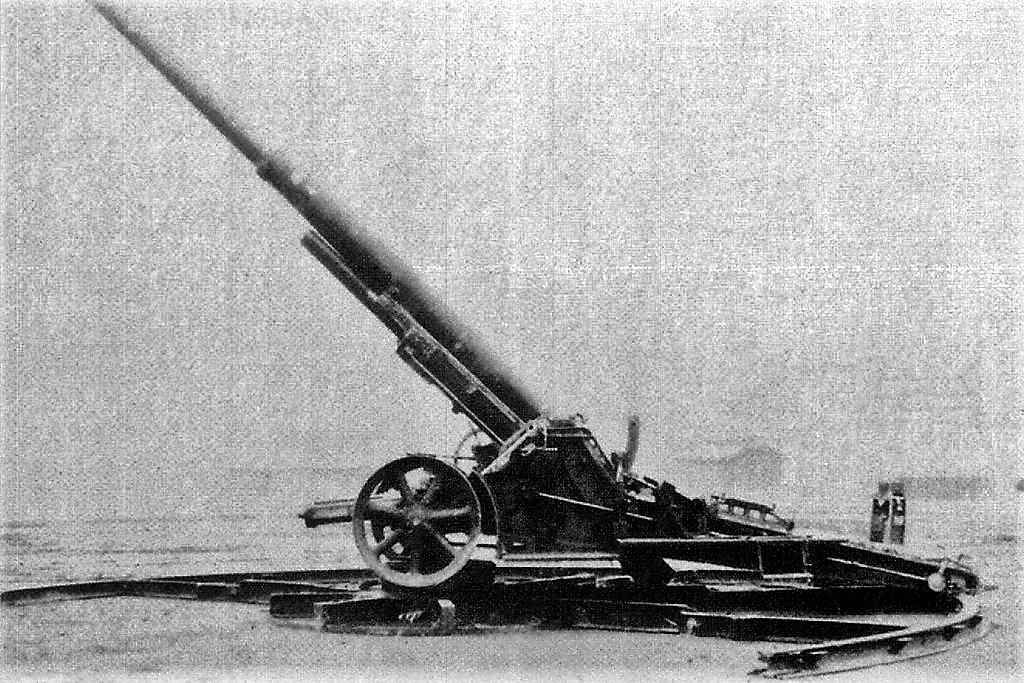
A Type 96 on its turntable.

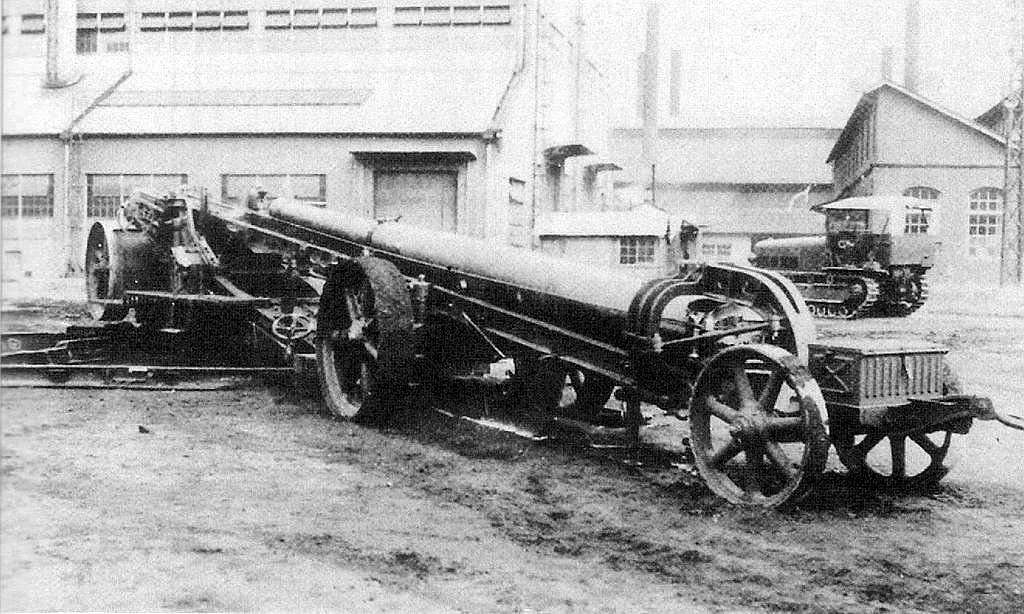
A Type 96 broken down for transport.

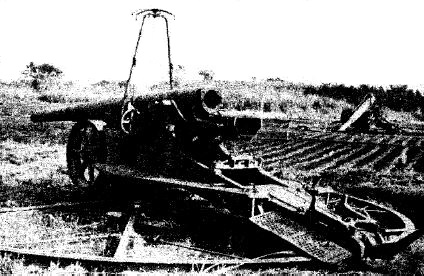
A Type 96 showing its breech.

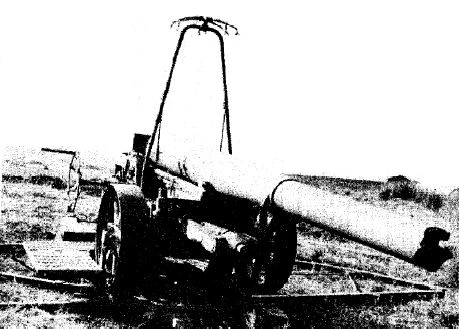
A damaged Type 96 with its barrel lowered.
