= 35.5 cm Haubitze M1 =

- The breech of a Haubitze M1 being lifted into position to be mated to the barrel
- Type: Super-heavy siege howitzer
- Place of origin: Germany

Service history
- In service: 1939–45
- Used by: Nazi Germany
- Wars: World War II

Production history
- Designer: Rheinmetall
- Designed: 1936–39
- Manufacturer: Rheinmetall
- Produced: 1939–44
- No. built: 8

Specifications
- Mass: 75 tonnes (74 long tons; 83 short tons)
- Barrel length: 8.05 metres (317 in)
- Shell: separate-loading, cased charge
- Shell weight: 575 kilograms (1,268 lb)
- Caliber: 356 millimetres (14.0 in)
- Breech: horizontal sliding-block
- Recoil: Hydro-pneumatic
- Carriage: box
- Elevation: +45° to 75° (firing)
- Traverse: 6° (on carriage); 360° (on platform)
- Rate of fire: 1 round per 4 minutes
- Muzzle velocity: 570 metres per second (1,900 ft/s)
- Maximum firing range: 20,850 metres (22,800 yd)
- Filling: TNT and wax
- Filling weight: 7.94 kilograms (17.5 lb)

The 35.5 cm Haubitze M1 was a German siege howitzer. It was developed by Rheinmetall before World War II to meet the German Army's request for a super-heavy howitzer. Eight were produced between 1939 and 1944. It saw service in the Battle of France and spent the rest of the war on the Eastern Front, saw action in Operation Barbarossa, the siege of Sevastopol, the siege of Leningrad and helped to put down the Warsaw Uprising in 1944.

== Description ==
The Haubitze M1 was best described as an enlarged 24 cm Kanone 3. It used many of the same design principles as the smaller weapon including the dual-recoil system and a two-part carriage capable of all-around traverse when mounted on its firing platform. It also disassembled into six loads for transport. The loads were cradle, barrel, top carriage, bottom carriage, front platform and turntable and the rear platform. Each piece on its trailer was towed by a 18 t (18 long tons; 20 short tons) Sd.Kfz. 9 half-track. A seventh half-track towed the gantry crane required to assemble the weapon. The gantry crane (powered by a generator on its towing vehicle) would be erected at the new firing position and would take about two hours to assemble the entire weapon.

The howitzer's dual recoil system meant that the barrel in its ring cradle would recoil on the carriage while the carriage would recoil, in turn, on the firing platform. The recoil for both parts was controlled by hydro-pneumatic cylinders. Its elevation gear and ammunition hoist were electrically powered from the generator, although both could be used manually if necessary. Only a 575 kg (1,268 lb) concrete-piercing shell (Betongranate) with a ballistic cap was ever used by this weapon. It used 234.2 kilograms (516 lb) of propellant in four increments to reach a range of 20,850 metres (22,800 yd).

== Combat history ==
During the Battle of France one howitzer equipped Super-Heavy Artillery Battery (schwerster Artillerie-Batterie) 810 under the command of I Corps, Army Group B. It bombarded Belgian fortifications of the PFL I Line after the fall of Fort Eben-Emael on the first day of the battle. The battery was absorbed by Heavy Artillery Battalion 641 as its first battery on 27 July 1940 and it fought with that battalion on the Eastern Front during Operation Barbarossa where it initially was assigned to the 9th Army, Army Group Center. In 1942 it participated in the assault on Sevastopol under the command of 11th Army of Army Group South. It accompanied that army north to Leningrad during the summer of 1942 so that it could participate in the siege of Leningrad. Soviet efforts to relieve the siege frustrated several German attempts to consolidate their positions there, but the battalion remained there through the beginning of 1944. It participated in the German efforts to suppress the Warsaw Uprising in August—September 1944.

Surviving records identify no more than one howitzer in service at any one time even though five were delivered in 1942 and a few others in the following years.

== See also ==
- 24 cm Kanone 3
