= 15 cm Ring Kanone C/92 =

German siege gun

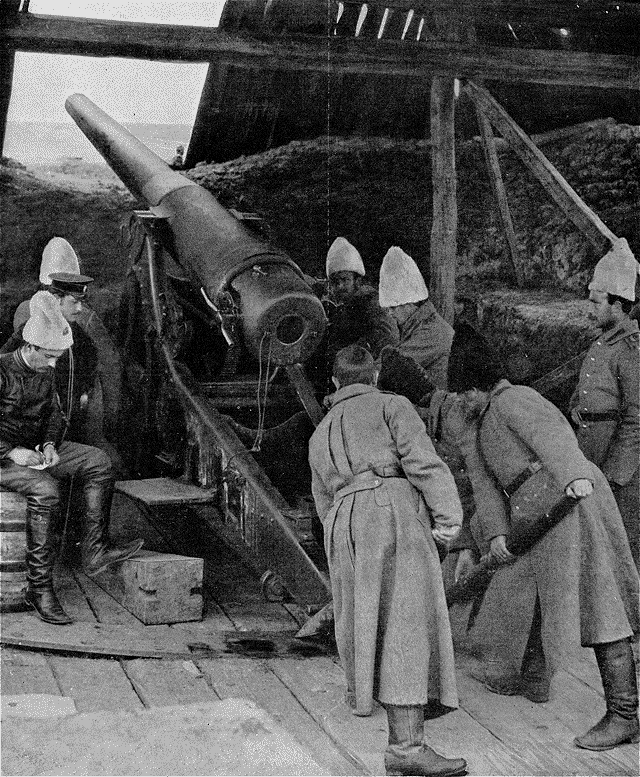
- A Bulgarian C/92 in action during Siege of Adrianople.
- Type: Fortress gun Siege gun
- Place of origin: German Empire

Service history
- In service: 1892−1918
- Used by: German Empire; Kingdom of Bulgaria; Ottoman Empire
- Wars: Italo-Turkish War; Balkan Wars; World War I

Production history
- Designer: Krupp
- Designed: 1892
- Manufacturer: Krupp
- Produced: 1892

Specifications
- Mass: Travel: 8,895 kg (19,610 lb); Combat: 6,032 kg (13,298 lb)
- Barrel length: 4.47 m (14 ft 8 in) L/30
- Shell: Separate-loading, bagged charges and projectiles
- Shell weight: 40 kg (88 lb)
- Caliber: 149.1 mm (5.87 in)
- Breech: Horizontal sliding-block
- Recoil: None
- Carriage: Box trail
- Elevation: -4° to +40°
- Traverse: None
- Rate of fire: 2 rpm
- Muzzle velocity: 483 m/s (1,580 ft/s)
- Maximum firing range: 10.5–12 km (6.5–7.5 mi)

The 15 cm Ring Kanone C/92 was a fortress and siege gun developed in the 1880s that saw service in the Italo-Turkish War, Balkan Wars, and World War I.

== History ==
During the Franco-Prussian War, the breech-loaded Prussian cannons easily outclassed their muzzle-loaded French rivals. After the war, the Prussian Army replaced its 15 cm C/61 and C/64 cannons with the new 15 cm Ring Kanone C/72. The French also rearmed and their new breech-loaded Canon de 155 L mle 1877 had nearly twice the range of the C/72. During the 1880s Krupp began designing a replacement for the C/72 which would retain the same 149.1 mm (5.87 in) caliber as the C/72 and would feature a barrel 30 calibers in length rather than the 23 calibers of its predecessor. The new gun was designated the 15 cm Ring Kanone C/92 and could have been introduced as early as 1889 but the development of smokeless powder and new high-explosive shells necessitated design changes and the new guns weren't introduced until 1892. C/92's were assigned to fortress and siege artillery battalions of the Imperial German Army. Each artillery battery consisted of four guns with four batteries per battalion.

== Design ==
The C/92 was a typical built-up gun constructed of steel with a central rifled tube, reinforcing layers of hoops, and trunnions. The guns used a predecessor of Krupp's horizontal sliding-block breech known as a cylindro-prismatic breech and it fired separate-loading, bagged charges and projectiles.

The C/92 was fairly conventional for its time and most nations had similar guns such as the Russian 6-inch siege gun M1904. Like many of its contemporaries, the C/92 had a tall and narrow box trail carriage built from bolted iron plates with two wooden 12-spoke wheels. The carriages were tall because the guns were designed to sit behind a parapet with the barrel overhanging the front in the fortress artillery role or behind a trench or berm in the siege role. Like its contemporaries, the C/92's carriage did not have a recoil mechanism or a gun shield. However, when used in a fortress the guns could be connected to an external recoil mechanism which connected to a steel eye on a concrete firing platform and a hook on the carriage between the wheels. For siege gun use a wooden firing platform could be assembled ahead of time and the guns could attach to the same type of recoil mechanism. A set of wooden ramps were also placed behind the wheels and when the gun fired the wheels rolled up the ramp and was returned to position by gravity. There was also no traverse so the gun had to be levered into position to aim. A drawback of this system was the gun had to be re-aimed each time which lowered the rate of fire. To facilitate towing on soft ground and lessen recoil the wheels were often fitted with Bonagente grousers patented by the Italian major Crispino Bonagente. These consisted of twelve rectangular plates connected with elastic links and are visible in many photographs of World War I artillery from all of the combatants. For transport, the gun was broken down into two loads 5,035 kg (11,100 lb) and 3,860 kg (8,510 lb) for towing by horse teams or artillery tractors.

== Balkan Wars ==
C/92's were used by both the Bulgarians and Ottoman forces during the Balkan Wars. It's also possible that Albania, the Kingdom of Greece, the Kingdom of Montenegro, the Kingdom of Romania, and the Kingdom of Serbia may have either bought C/92's or captured them from Ottoman forces. It is also likely they were used by Ottoman forces during the Italo-Turkish War.

== World War I ==
The majority of military planners before the First World War were wedded to the concept of fighting an offensive war of rapid maneuver which in a time before mechanization meant a focus on cavalry and light horse artillery firing shrapnel shells. Since the C/92 was heavier and wasn't designed with field use in mind it was employed as a fortress gun.

Although the majority of combatants had heavy field artillery prior to the outbreak of the First World War, none had adequate numbers of heavy guns in service, nor had they foreseen the growing importance of heavy artillery once the Western Front stagnated and trench warfare set in. The theorists hadn't foreseen that trenches, barbed wire, and machine guns had robbed them of the mobility they had been counting on and like in the Franco-Prussian and Russo-Turkish war the need for high-angle heavy artillery reasserted itself. Since aircraft of the period were not yet capable of carrying large diameter bombs the burden of delivering heavy firepower fell on the artillery. The combatants scrambled to find anything that could fire a heavy shell and that meant emptying the fortresses and scouring the depots for guns held in reserve. It also meant converting coastal artillery and naval guns to siege guns by either giving them simple field carriages or mounting the larger pieces on rail carriages.

A combination of factors led the Germans to issue C/92's to their frontline troops:

- An underestimation of artillery losses during the first two years of the war and an inadequate number of replacement guns being produced.
- Many artillery pieces were neither tall enough or capable of the high-angle fire necessary to fire from entrenched positions.
- Few light field-artillery pieces had the range or fired a large enough projectile to be useful in an indirect fire role.

The C/92 could be considered a dubious upgrade from the C/72 because at the time of their introduction they were virtually obsolescent due to the invention of hydro-pneumatic recoil mechanisms and the introduction of separate loading quick fire ammunition. Also despite having a barrel 7 calibers longer and using smokeless propellant the improvement in range was only 3.2 km (2 mi). Although new guns with superior performance were introduced the C/92's remained in service until the end of the war due to the number in service, a shortage of heavy artillery and a lack of replacements.

== Ammunition ==
The C/92 fired a variety of separate-loading, 10.7 kg (23 lb 9 oz) bagged charges and projectiles.

- Common incendiary shell - 40 kg (88 lb) cast iron shell filled with black powder.
- Shrapnel shell - 40 kg (88 lb) with 900 balls.
- M1914 shrapnel shell - 40 kg (88 lb) with 1,225 balls.
- High explosive - 40 kg (88 lb) with Amatol filling.
- High explosive - 40 kg (88 lb) with TNT filling.

== Photo Gallery ==
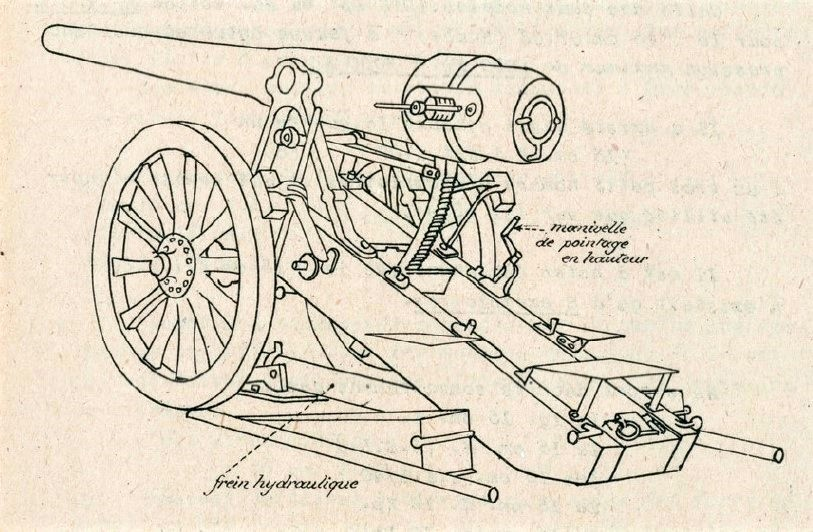
A line drawing of the guns components.

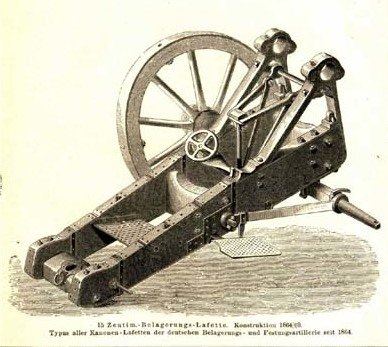
Carriage and elevation mechanism details for the C/92.

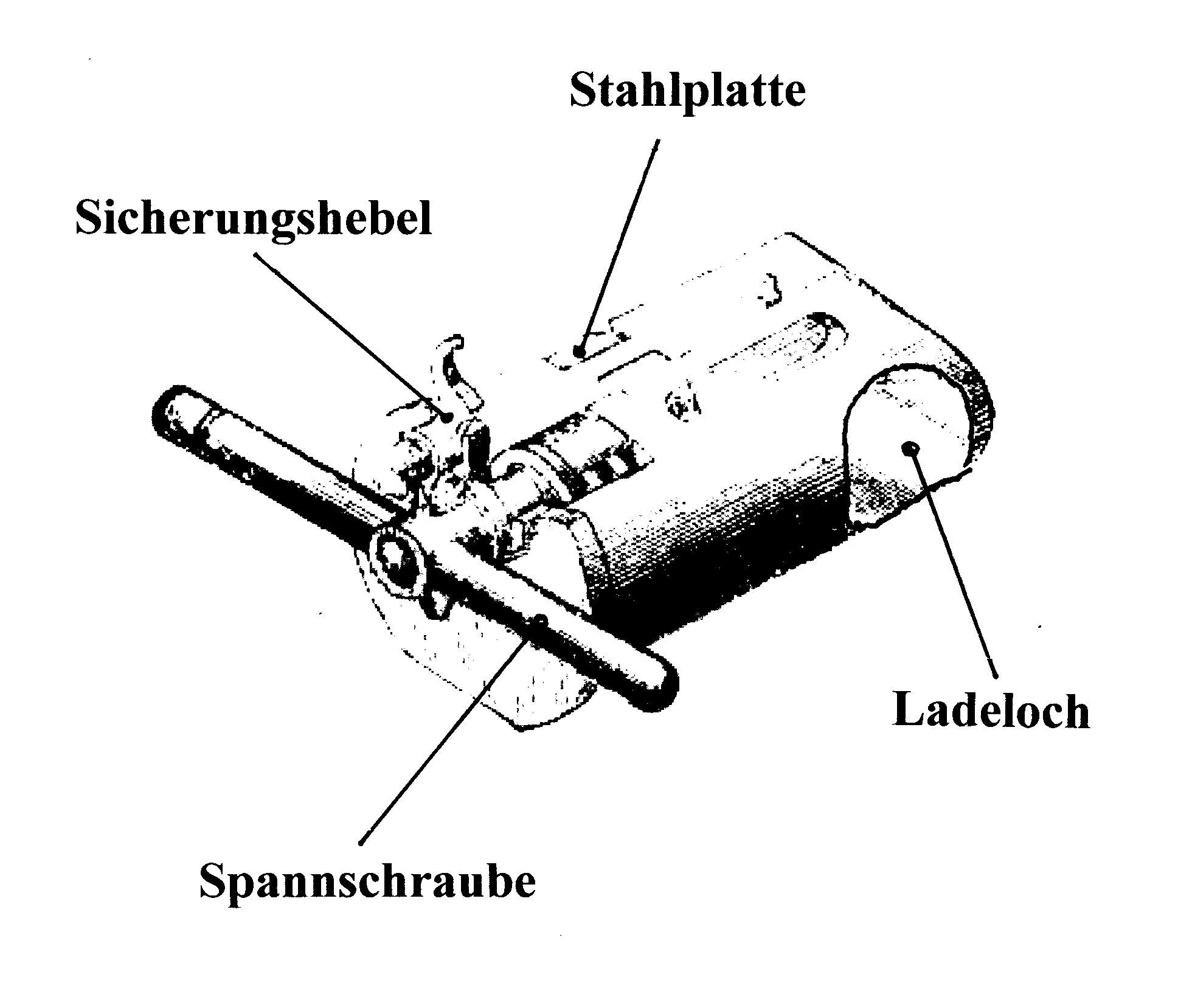
The breech block of the C/92.
