= Type 7 30 cm howitzer =

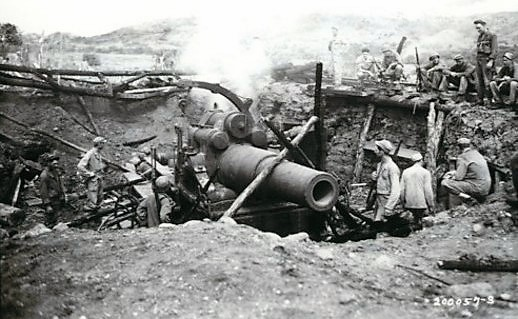
- One of three 12-inch howitzers, taken by the 158th Infantry Regiment on Luzon in the Philippines.
- Type: Coastal artillery Siege artillery
- Place of origin: Empire of Japan

Service history
- In service: Empire of Japan
- Used by: Imperial Japanese Army
- Wars: Second Sino-Japanese War; Soviet–Japanese border conflicts World War II

Production history
- Unit cost: Approx. 217,000 yen (Approx. $58,300 USD) in August 1939
- Produced: 1918
- No. built: 10 - Short barrel 20 - Long barrel

Specifications
- Mass: Short: 60 t (59 long tons; 66 short tons); Long: 97 t (95 long tons; 107 short tons)
- Barrel length: Short: 5 m (16 ft 5 in) L/16 calibers Long: 7.2 m (23 ft 7 in) L/23
- Shell: Separate loading cased charges and projectiles
- Shell weight: 399 kg (880 lb)
- Caliber: 305 mm (12 in)
- Breech: Interrupted screw
- Recoil: Hydro-gravity
- Carriage: Garrison mount
- Elevation: +2° to +73°
- Traverse: 360°
- Muzzle velocity: Short: 400 m/s (1,300 ft/s); Long: 500 m/s (1,600 ft/s)
- Maximum firing range: Short: 11.8 km (7.3 mi); Long: 14.8 km (9.2 mi)

The Type 7 30 cm howitzer (Japanese: 七式 三十 榴 弾 砲, romanized: Shichi-nenshiki sanjū-senchi ryūdanhō) was a howitzer used by the Imperial Japanese Army in the Second Sino-Japanese War, Soviet–Japanese border conflicts and during the Pacific Campaign in World War II. The designation Type 7 indicates its year of introduction, the seventh year of the reign of Emperor Taishō, or 1918 according to the Gregorian calendar.

== Design ==
The Type 7 was conventional for its time and other nations had similar weapons such as the Italian Obice da 305/17, Russian 11-inch mortar M1877, and the 12-inch coast defense mortar from the United States. The theory of operation for the Type 7 was that a low-velocity howitzer firing a large shell at a high-angle was more likely to destroy an enemy ship by penetrating its thin deck armor than a high-velocity low-angle gun attempting to penetrate its thicker belt armor. The downside was that high-angle fire was harder to aim correctly so more howitzers would be needed to defend an area from attack. However, if the area was constrained by geography like a port at the mouth of a river the navigation channels could be measured ahead of time and firing ranges calculated. A complicating factor was as naval artillery progressed their size and range soon eclipsed its range.

The Type 7 howitzer was introduced to supplement the Armstrong-designed 28 cm L/10 howitzer as coastal artillery with a secondary siege artillery role. Although it had a caliber of 305 mm (12 in), it was referred to as a 30 cm howitzer. The Type 7s were typical built-up guns of the period, with rifled steel inner tubes and layers of external reinforcing hoops. The guns had interrupted screw breeches and fired separate loading cased charges and projectiles. Firing was by percussion cap and hammer tripped by a long lanyard. There were two variants of the Type 7 produced, one with a short, L/16 caliber, barrel, and one with a long, L/23 caliber, barrel. The long barreled version weighed nearly twice as much as the short barreled version.

The Type 7s were mounted on garrison mounts which consisted of large rectangular steel platforms approximately 5.72 m (18 ft 9 in) long, and 1.42 m (4 ft 8 in) wide, set on top of large circular geared steel rings set in concrete. This mount allowed 360° of traverse and +2° to +73° of elevation. The recoil system for the Type 7 consisted of a U-shaped gun cradle which held the trunnioned barrel and a slightly inclined firing platform with a hydro-gravity recoil system above the breech. When the gun fired, the hydraulic buffers slowed the recoil of the cradle which slid up a set of inclined rails on the firing platform and then returned the gun to position by the combined action of the buffers and gravity. Two equilibrators were mounted below the barrel and two compressed air-tanks were mounted on the carriage for blowing out the tube after firing.

== History ==
In 1933, the short-barreled Type 7 was modified so that it could be quickly disassembled into nine wagon loads, transported and reassembled on site. The wagons were able to be towed by artillery tractors at a speed of 20 km/h (12 mph).

In February 1940, two Type 7 long-barreled howitzers were moved to the Kotō fortress in Manchuria to strengthen Japanese defenses in the event of a Soviet attack. The Japanese army had eight fortresses built along the border with the Soviet Union, of which the Kotō fortress on the Ussuri River was the strongest. Large-scale fortifications, similar to the Maginot Line, were guarded by the 4th Border Guard Unit. The 1,400-strong crew had two batteries of field guns and howitzers, the only Type 90 240 mm railway gun, and one experimental 41 cm howitzer. When the Soviets attacked the Japanese positions around the Kotō fortress in Operation August Storm in 1945, the entire fortress crew and all guns were lost.

It is believed that ten Type 7s were used by the Japanese during the Battle of Corregidor in 1942.

In 1944, the 4th Independent Heavy Artillery Battalion with Type 7 short-barreled howitzers was ordered to the Philippines in anticipation of American landings. At the top of the picture is a Type 7 which was captured by US soldiers of the 158th Regiment on Luzon. The depicted gun position was roughly 10 m (33 ft) wide and 2.5 m (8 ft 2 in) deep. The howitzer was disguised by a house that could be pushed back on rails just before firing. A garden with banana trees was planted around the position to increase the camouflage effect.

Four Type 7s were used for coastal defense on Honshu in 1945.

== Photo gallery ==
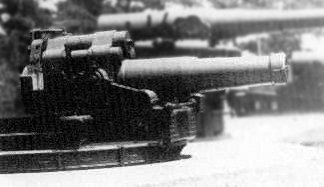
A Type 7 short-barreled gun on its garrison mount

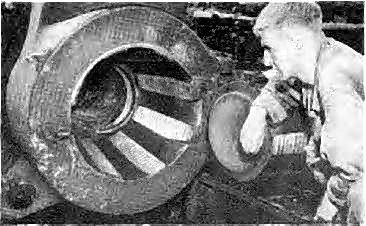
The interrupted screw breech of the gun

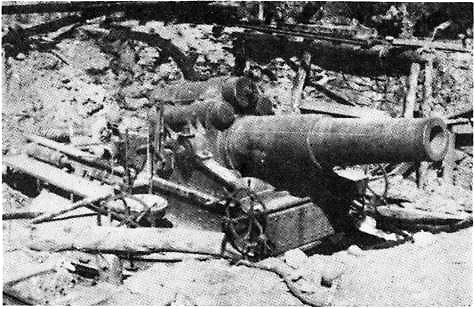
Two captured Type 30 cm Howitzers.

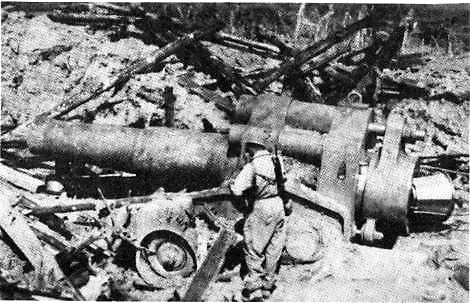
