= Canon de 24 C modèle 1876 =

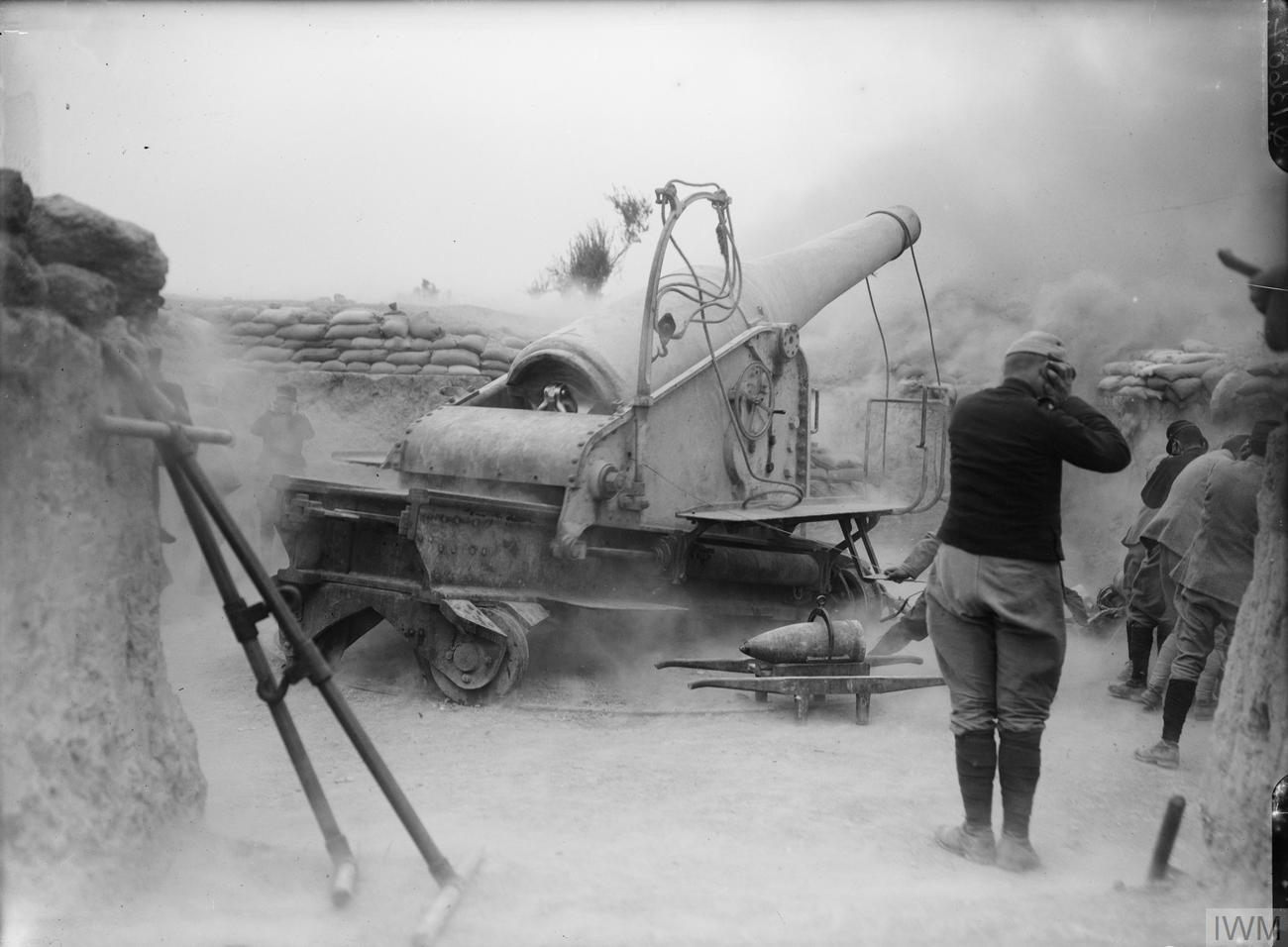
- A mle 1876 on a GPC carriage at Gallipoli.
- Type: Coastal artillery
- Place of origin: France

Service history
- In service: 1876–1945
- Used by: France
- Wars: World War I

Production history
- Designed: 1876
- Produced: 1876
- Variants: Railway gun Siege artillery

Specifications
- Mass: 16,200 kg
- Length: 5.365 m (17.60 ft) L/22.4
- Shell: Separate-loading, bagged charge and projectiles
- Shell weight: 162 kg (357 lb)
- Caliber: 240 mm (9.4 in)
- Breech: de Bange
- Recoil: Hydro-gravity
- Elevation: -5° to +30°
- Traverse: 360°
- Rate of fire: 1 round every two minutes
- Muzzle velocity: 470 m/s (1,500 ft/s) regular; 451 m/s (1,480 ft/s) shrapnel; 440 m/s (1,400 ft/s) armor-piercing
- Effective firing range: 10.5 km (6.5 mi)
- Maximum firing range: 13.4 km (8.3 mi)

The Canon de 24 C modèle 1876 was a coastal defense gun designed and built from 1876. A number of guns were also converted to railway guns during World War I in order to meet a need for heavy artillery.

== Development ==
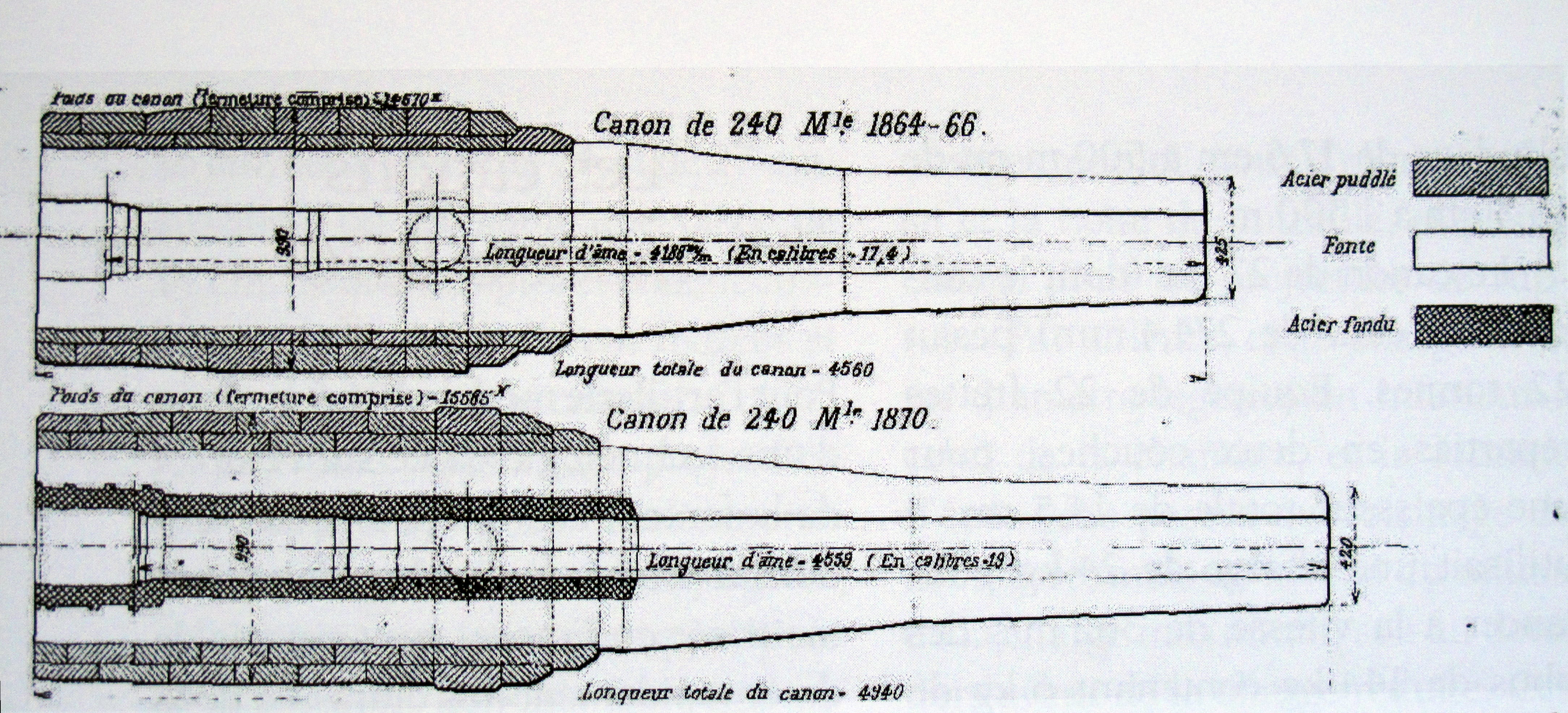
M 1864-66 and M 1870

The Canon de 24 C modèle 1876 was part of one of several families of built-up guns which used a barrel of cast iron (fonte). These families consisted of guns of similar construction, but different calibers and therefore tended to look alike. The 24 C modèle 1864-1866 had a barrel reinforced with hoops of puddled steel. The 24 C modèle 1870 added a cast steel (acier fondu) inner tube.

The Canon de 24 C modèle 1876 was made out of the Canon de 24 C modèle 1870. The split in models was caused by that after the 1870/1 Franco-Prussian War, the French Army took over responsibility for parts of coastal defense. It meant that the navy had to cede a lot of guns to the army, which also applied to a number of unfinished barrels of the Canon de 24 C modèle 1870. This gave the army the opportunity to install a De Bange breech and De Bange obturator. The 'new' gun was then called modèle 1876.

The development of the modèle 1876 from the unfinished 24 C modèle 1870 guns acquired by the army, made that the two guns were very similar. However, when the M 1876 was finished, it was also different in aspects like weight and length of bore.

In French service guns of mixed steel/iron construction were designated in centimeters while all steel guns were designated in millimeters. However, reference materials do not always distinguish the difference in construction and use either unit of measurement.

== Characteristics ==
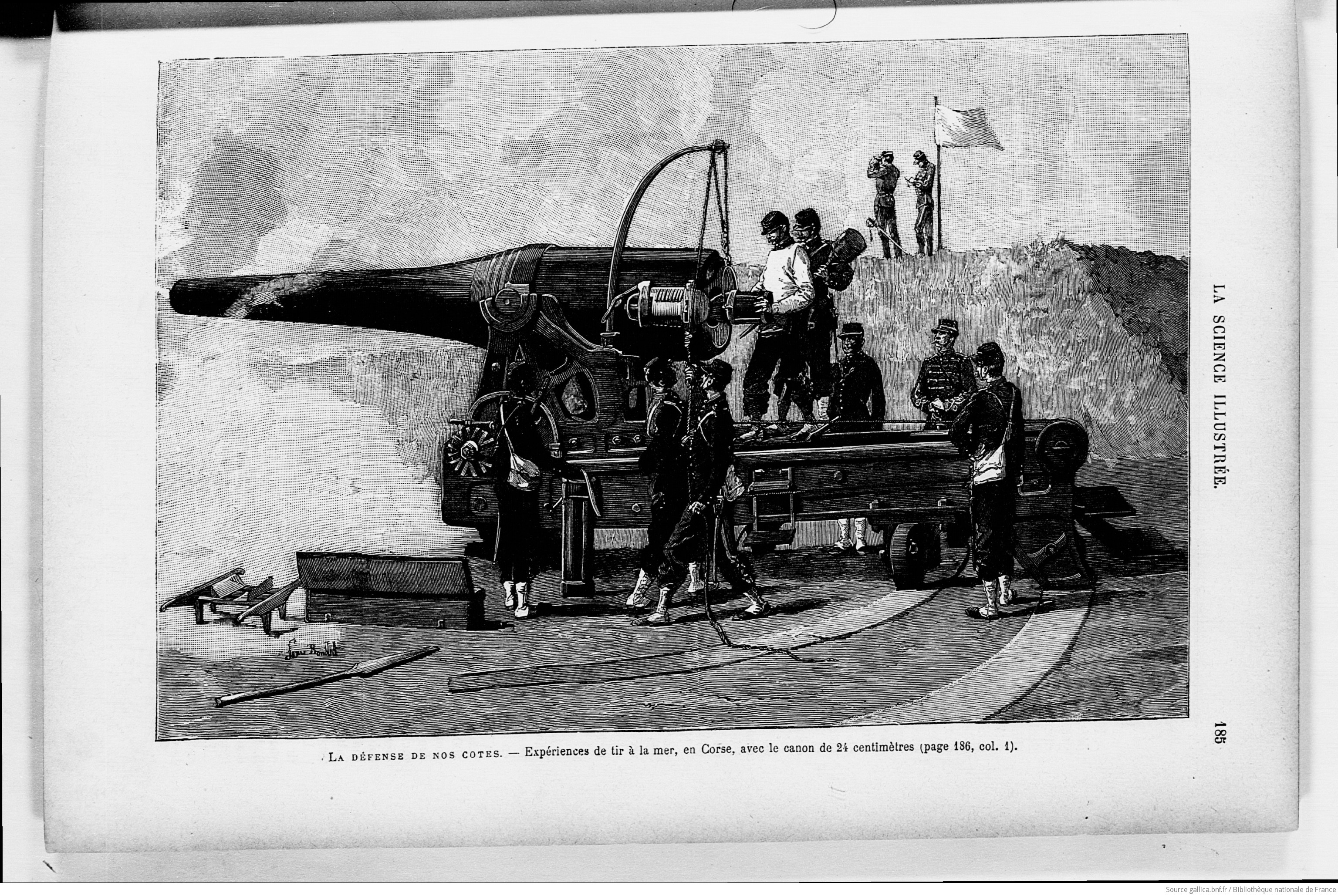
At Corsica in 1889

The barrel of the 24 C M 1876 was of cast iron reinforced with two layers of hoops of puddled steel. It had an inner tube made of cast steel. The barrel was 5.365 m long and weighed 16,200 kg. The barrel had 60 progressive grooves turning from left to right. The breech was of the 'De Bange' system.

The tubing of the barrel was done as follows: The cold steel inner tube was pushed into the warmed up iron barrel, which was in a vertical position. When everything had cooled down, the inner tube had been pressed down longitudinally by 1.81 mm and in diameter by 0.2 mm. The hoops were applied to the barrel while they were hot and the barrel was cold. This shrunk the barrel diagonally by 1.10 mm.

The 24 C M 1876 used separate loading bagged charges. The charge was uniform for all projectiles. It consisted of a silk bag of 770 by 190 mm filled with 28 kg (62 lb) of S.P.2 gunpowder.

If the gun fired at an angle of 30 degrees, the maximum range was 10,500 m.

=== Carriages ===
The mle 1876 was mounted on a number of different models of garrison mounts with limited traverse. The standard carriage was made of cast iron. It had an upper carriage weighing 5,600 kg. This slides on a frame (châssis) weighing 10,500 kg. This made that the gun's trunnion were 2.195 m above ground.

The combination of an upper carriage which held the trunnioned barrel and a slightly inclined frame, served to handle the recoil. When the gun was fired it moved up the frame, but was slowed down by a brake When the motion stopped, the combined action of the brake and gravity returned the upper carriage to its place.

The early carriage used eight compressor brakes (lames de frein) that slid into eight more which were attached to the lower frame. Later carriages had a set of hydrolic brakes. The carriage allowed an elevation to 31 degrees and a declination to 6 degrees.

There was also a GPC mount (côte sur affût type Guerre à Pivot Central) which was a rectangular steel firing platform which sat on top of a large circular steel track embedded in concrete behind a parapet. A rectangular steel firing platform with four wheels rotated on the track and gave 360° of traverse.

=== Projectiles ===
The regular grenade M 1877 was 650 mm long and had a diameter of 238 mm. It had an internal charge of either 6.650 kg of S.P.2 gunpowder or 5.5 kg of ordinary gunpowder. This was ignited by a percussion fuze. Fully loaded it weighed about 121 kg (267 lb). With a regular charge, the regular grenade attained an initial velocity of 470 m/s.

The shrapnel shell had the same external form as the regular grenade. The internal charge consisted of 1.9 kg of gunpowder and 370 balls of 26.5 mm weighing 70 gramm. It weighed 130 kg and attained an initial velocity of 451 m/s.

The armor piercing cast iron grenade was a bit shorter than the others. It had an internal charge of about 1 kg of gunpowder, which was ignited by the heat resulting from the shock of the shot making contact with its armored target. The loaded grenade weighed about 141 kg and attained an initial velocity of 440 m/s.

Later on, armor piercing grenades of chilled cast iron and steel were tested. The steel armor-piercing grenade weighed about 147 kg.

=== Wagon ===
Getting a gun of 16,200 kg and its heavy carriages into position was a real challenge in the 1870s. For the Canon de 24 C modèle 1876 the Chariot No. 2 was made. It weighed 4,635 kg, making a fully loaded wagon of 21,000 kg. The parts containing the wheels where connected by a pivot and made that it could make any turn. It was drawn by 20 horses.

== Railway guns ==
In order to address a need for heavy artillery a number of mle 1876 guns were converted to railway guns and given the designation 24 cm Canon G modèle 1916. The conversion entailed removing the gun cradle from its carriage and mounting it on a variety of flatbed rail wagons built from steel I beams and timbers on top of a two, three or four-axle rail bogie. The gun carriage changed from an inclined hydro-gravity system to a horizontal hydro-spring system where the recoil was absorbed by a hydraulic buffer and returned to firing position by springs. At the front of the carriage there was also an attachment for an earth anchor and between the axles there were screw jacks which could be lowered to take weight off the axles and anchor the carriage. Elevation stayed the same but there was no traverse. The guns either had to be removed from the tracks and put on a wooden firing platform and levered into place or drawn across a section of curved track to aim. Beginning in 1916 twenty-four guns were assigned to French artillery units, thirteen were assigned to French training units and sixteen were assigned to artillery units of the US Army.

== Siege artillery ==
In addition to its coastal artillery role, an unknown number of guns were used as siege artillery during the First World War.

=== Gallipoli ===
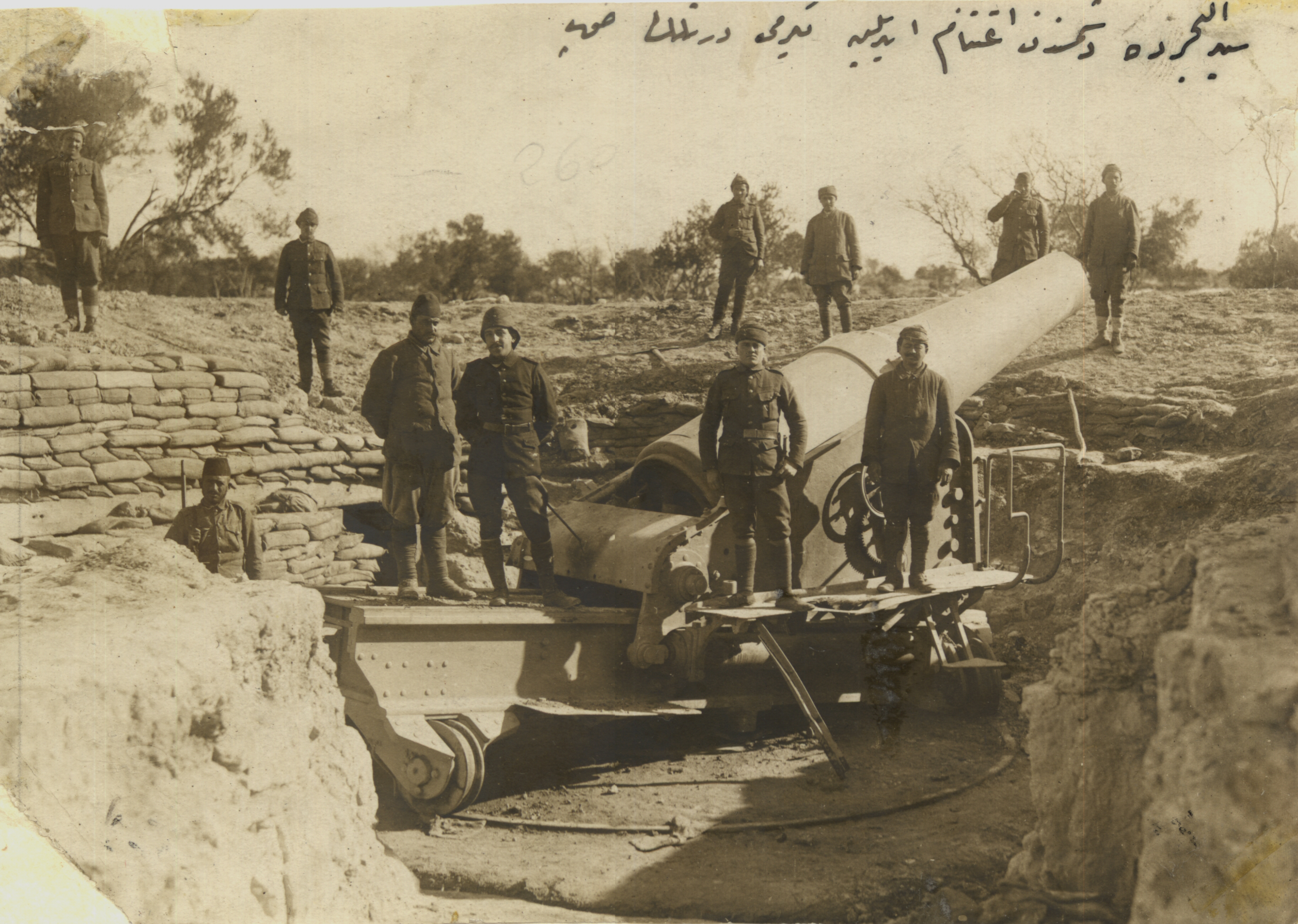
Gun captured at Gallipoli.

During the Gallipoli campaign, the allied troops used at least four Canon de 24 C modèle 1876. When the troops left in January 1916, these were left behind. Two had been made unfit by blowing off the front part of the barrel. These four guns remained behind at Sedd el Bahr Seddülbahir.

In 2023, a project started to create a large open air museum about the Gallipoli campaign. In and around Seddülbahir nine gun emplacements were restored. Obviously, those of the four Canon de 24 C modèle 1876 were included. There is a picture of a gun as captured by the Ottoman forces at the end of the campaign (image to the right). This gun seems shortened by bursting. There seems to be an exact match with one of the guns as photographed in 2024.

== Photo Gallery ==
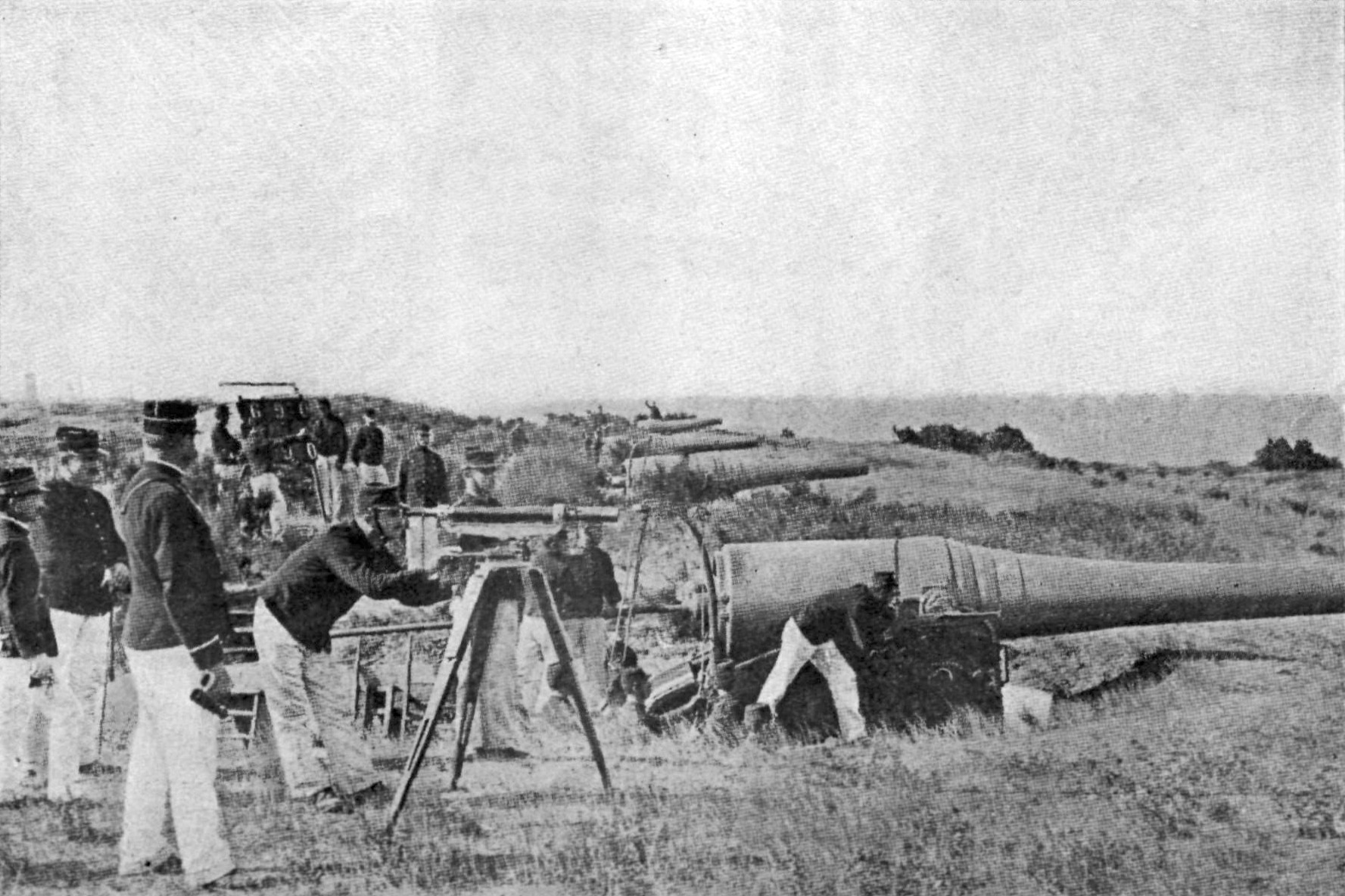
Jamblet battery at Ile d´Aix.

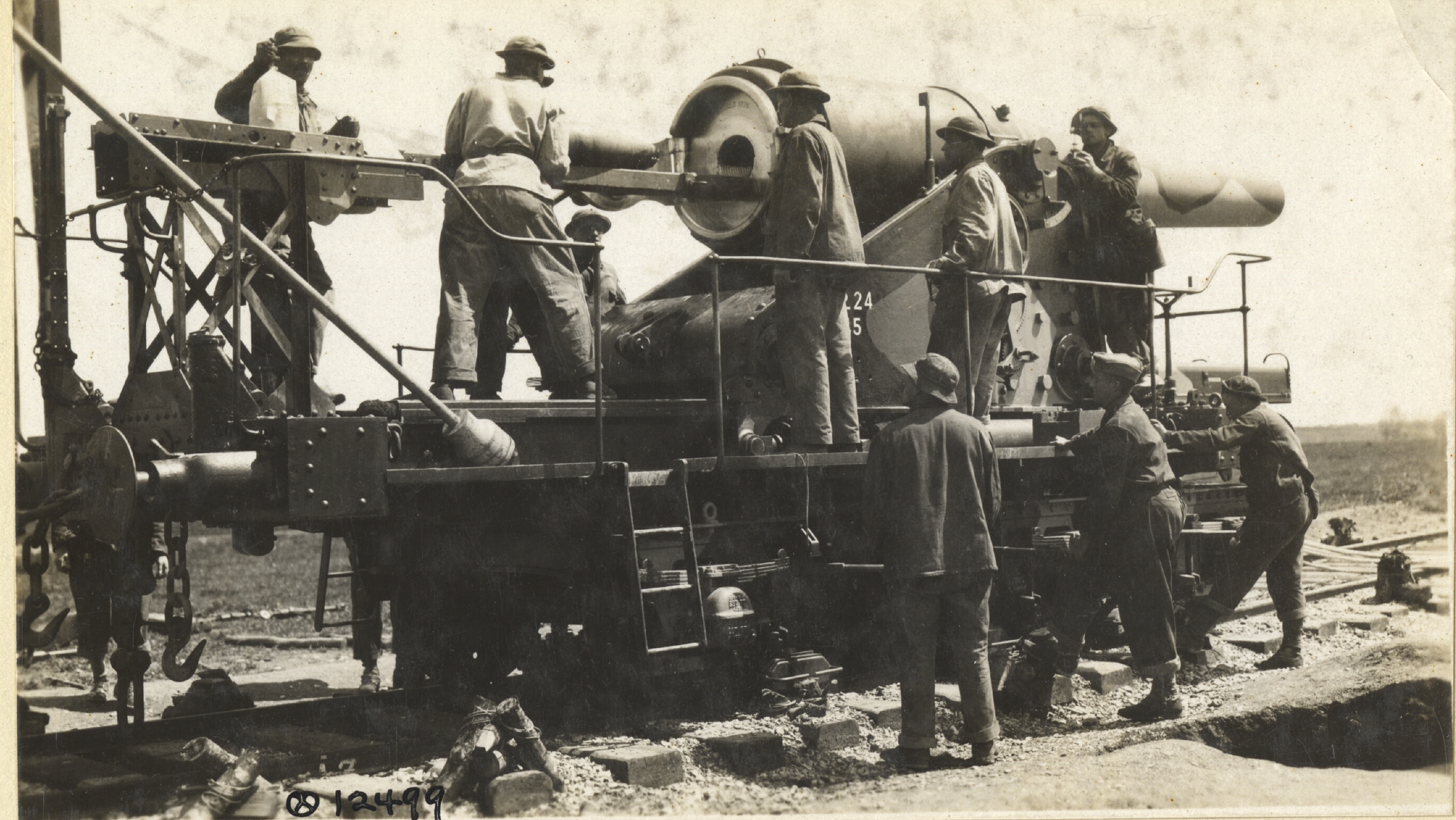
A mle 1876 in service with the American 52nd Coastal Artillery Corps.

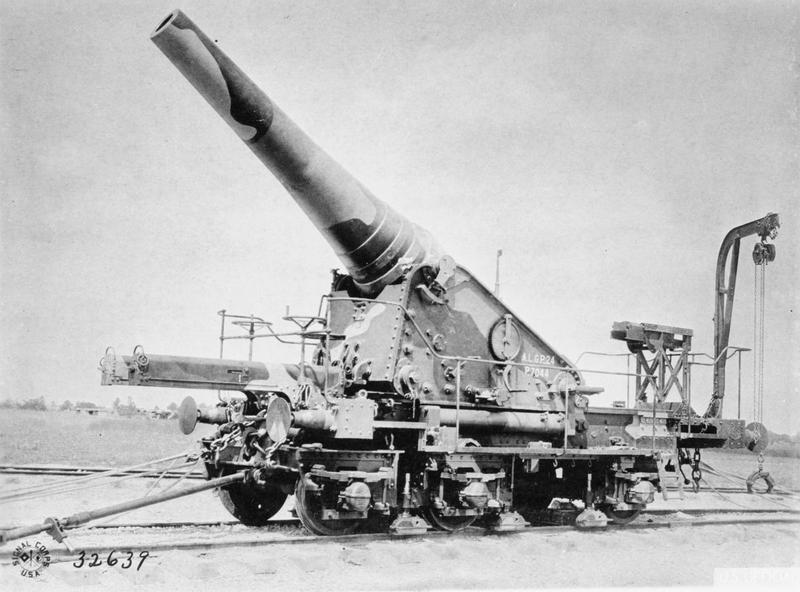
A 24 cm Canon G modèle 1916.

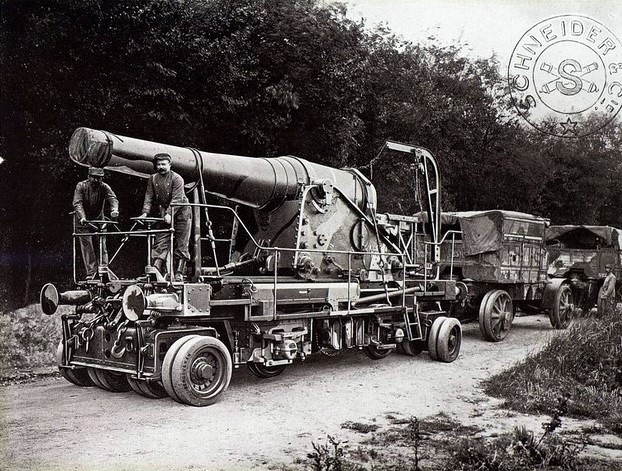
A Canon de 24 C modèle 1876 on a mixed-mode carriage.
