= Type 45 240 mm howitzer =

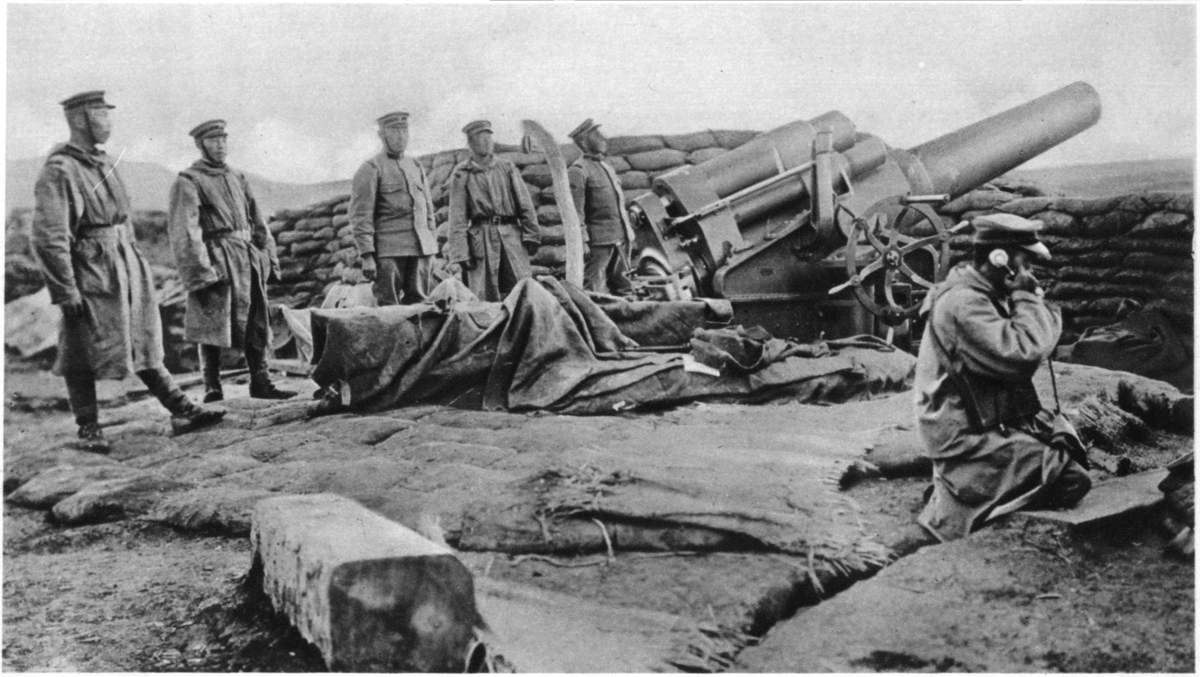
- A Type 45 howitzer during the Siege of Tsingtao.
- Type: Heavy howitzer
- Place of origin: Empire of Japan

Service history
- In service: 1912–1945
- Used by: Imperial Japanese Army
- Wars: World War I Sino-Japanese War; World War II

Production history
- No. built: 80

Specifications
- Mass: 38,000 kg (83,776 lb) (emplaced)
- Barrel length: 3.892 m (12 ft 9.2 in) L/16.2
- Crew: 9 + men
- Shell: Semi-fixed ammunition
- Shell weight: AP: 200 kg (440 lb)
- Caliber: 240 mm (9.4 in)
- Breech: Interrupted screw
- Recoil: Hydro-gravity
- Carriage: Garrison mount
- Elevation: -2° to +65°
- Traverse: 240°
- Muzzle velocity: 400 m/s (1,312 ft/s) approx
- Maximum firing range: 14 km (8.7 mi)

The Type 45 240 mm howitzer (四五式二十四糎榴弾砲, Yongo-shiki Nijyūyon-senchi Ryūdanhō) was a siege gun used by the Imperial Japanese Army during World War I and World War II. The Type 45 designation was given to this gun as it was accepted in the 45th year of Emperor Meiji's reign (1912). It was the first such weapon to be entirely designed in Japan.

== History and development ==
The Type 45 was developed after the Russo-Japanese War showed the value of heavy caliber howitzers and mortars when attacking strongly fortified enemy positions. The heavy weapons used by the Japanese Army at the Siege of Port Arthur were 28cm Imperial Japanese army howitzers. The Type 45 was the first such weapon designed and built entirely in Japan, and entered service in 1912. It was usually deployed as part of coastal artillery batteries.

The Type 45 could be disassembled and transported in 10 vehicles. It was used by heavy artillery units.

== Design ==
The Type 45 was an extremely heavy weapon, weighing nearly 38 tonnes (84,000 pounds) when emplaced. Setup required considerable time and the use of a crane to raise the heavy gun barrel onto a firing platform. The gun was normally used in static positions, either for siege or defense, it was based on an unknown French howitzer.

The gun could fire an armour-piercing shell with a muzzle velocity of 400 metres (1300 feet) per second to a maximum range of 10 km (11,000 yards). For reloading, the gun was lowered to the horizontal. The breech was an interrupted screw design.

== Combat record ==
The Type 45 was first deployed in combat during the Battle of Tsingtao in World War I, where it was effectively used against German defenses. In the Second Sino-Japanese War, there were fewer opportunities to use the Type 45, as Japanese forces rarely had to assault a position so strongly fortified that lesser caliber field artillery could not be used instead. However, with the start of World War II, the Type 45 was deployed in the Battle of Hong Kong against entrenched British landward defenses. It was also used in the Battle of Bataan and Battle of Corregidor in the invasion of the Philippines. The US Army says the Japanese fired 1,047 rounds from their Type 45 240mm howitzers in the Battle of Bataan and another 2,915 rounds at the Battle of Corregidor. In the final stages of the war, the Type 45 was also used in combat in Manchukuo against the invading Soviet Red Army during the Soviet invasion of Manchuria.

== Gallery ==
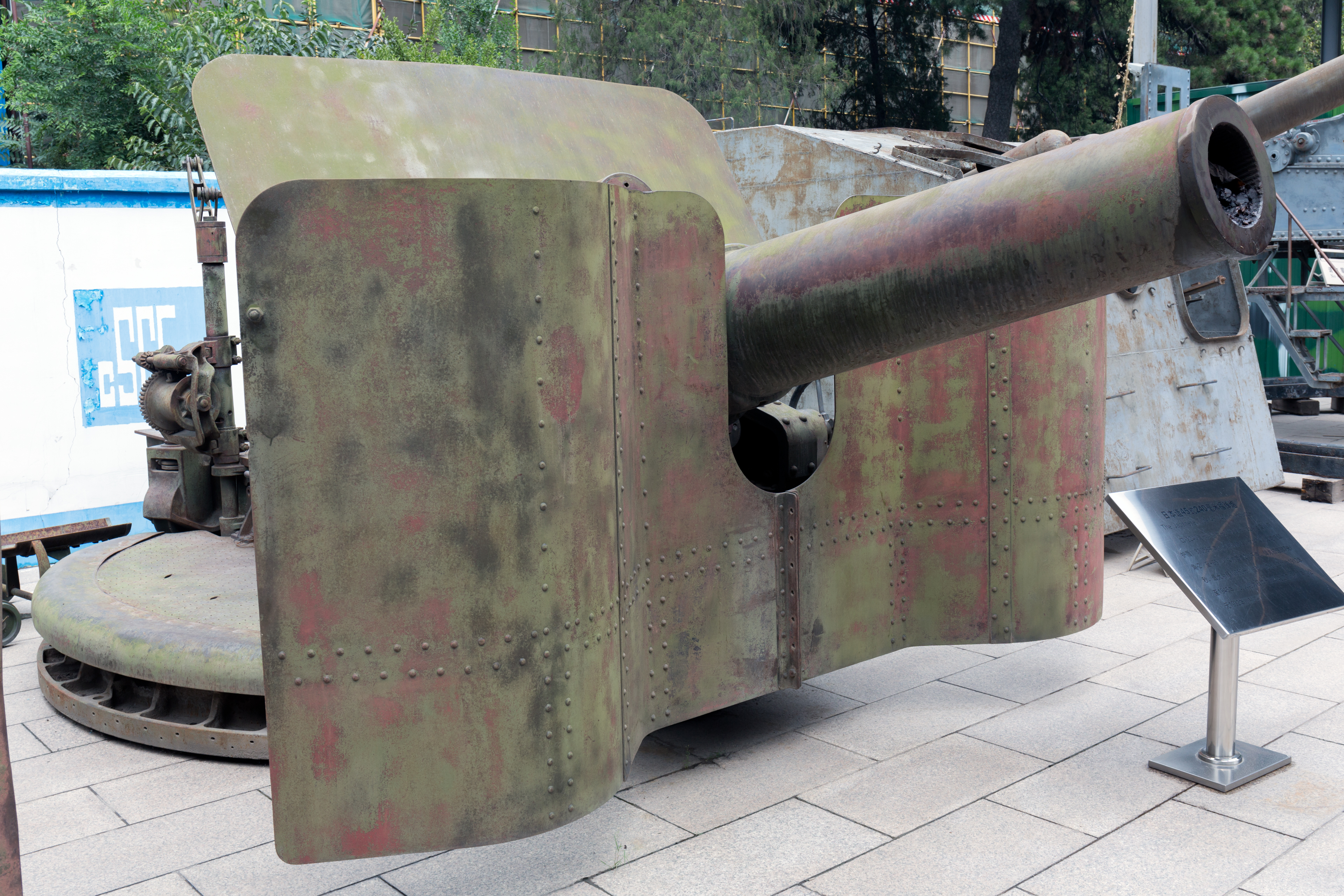
A Type 45 Howitzer at a Military Museum in Beijing China.

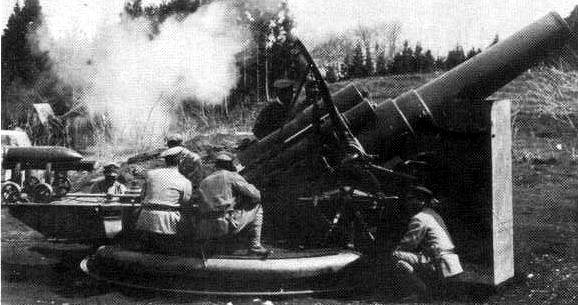
Type 45 24 cm howitzer.

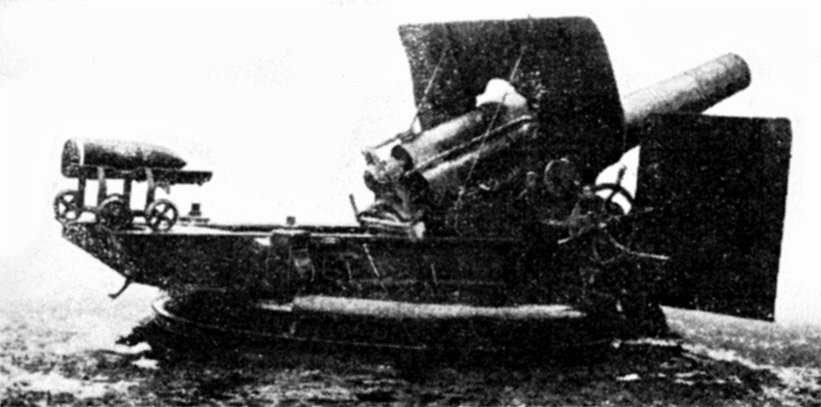
A view, showing a shell on the loading trolley.

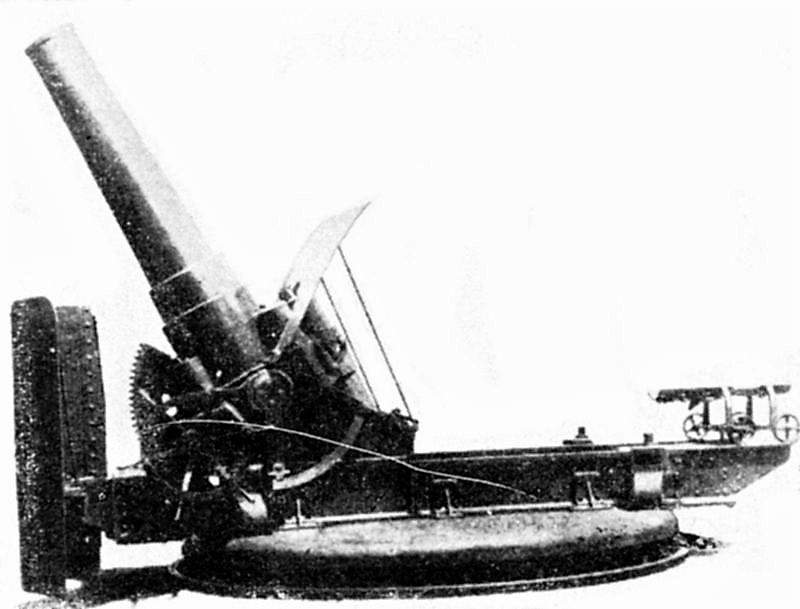
