= List of siege artillery =

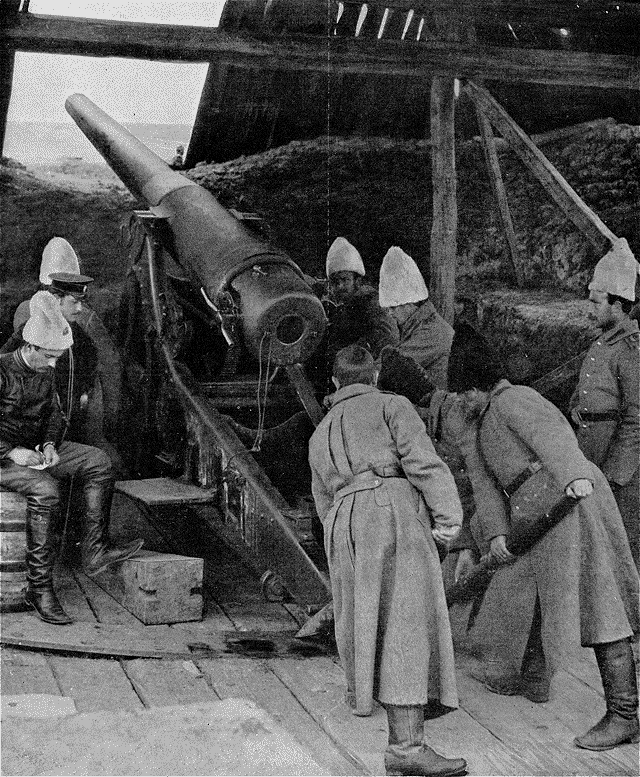
Bulgarian siege gun during the siege of Adrianople

Siege artillery (also siege guns or siege cannons) are heavy guns designed to bombard fortifications, cities, and other fixed targets. They are distinct from field artillery and are a class of siege weapon capable of firing heavy cannonballs or shells that required enormous transport and logistical support to operate. They lacked mobility and thus were rarely useful in more mobile warfare situations, generally having been superseded by heavy howitzers (towed and self-propelled artillery), strategic bomber aircraft, surface-to-surface missiles, ballistic missiles, cruise missiles and multiple rocket launchers in modern warfare.

== Muzzle-loading artillery ==
Caliber (mm)	Weapon name	Country of origin	Design
114	4.5-inch siege rifle	United States	1862
121	Canon lourd de 12 Gribeauval	Kingdom of France	1775
134	Canon de 16 Gribeauval	Kingdom of France	1775
148	24-pdr M1839 rifle	United States	1839
153	Canon de 24 Gribeauval	Kingdom of France	1775
163	32-pdr M1829 rifle	United States	1829
178	42-pdr M1841 rifle	United States	1841
200	Kartouwe	Dutch Republic	16th century
230	Abus Gun	Ottoman Empire	16th century
650	Dardanelles Gun	Ottoman Empire	1464
660	Dulle Griet	Holy Roman Empire	First half of 15th century
735	Faule Mette	Holy Roman Empire	1411
820	Pumhart von Steyr	Austrian Empire	Early 15th century
890	Tsar Cannon	(Russian Empire) Tsardom of Russia	1586

== Breech-loading artillery ==
Caliber (mm)	Weapon name	Country of origin	Design
88	9 cm Kanone C/79	German Empire	1879– World War I
107	42-line siege gun M1877	Russian Empire	Russo-Japanese War
120	12-cm Kanone M 80	Austria-Hungary	World War I
120	Canon de 120 mm modèle 1878	France	World War I, World War II
120	12 cm Kanone C/80	German Empire	World War I
120	Obusier de 120 mm modèle 1890	France	World War I
149.1	15 cm Kanone M 80	Austria-Hungary	World War I
149.1	15 cm Ring Kanone C/72	German Empire	World War I
149.1	15 cm Ring Kanone C/92	German Empire	World War I
149.1	15 cm Ring Kanone L/30	German Empire	World War I
149.1	Type 96 15 cm cannon	Japan	World War II
149.7	15 cm Mörser M1881	German Empire	World War I
150	Obusier de 15 cm TR Schneider-Canet-du-Bocage	Portugal / France	World War I
152.4	6 inch siege gun M1877	Russian Empire	World War I
152.5	BLC 6 inch siege gun	United Kingdom	1902–1915
152.4	6 inch siege gun M1904	Russian Empire	World War I
152.4	152 mm siege gun M1910	Russian Empire	World War I
152.4	Cannone da 152/45	Kingdom of Italy	World War I, World War II
155	De Bange 155 mm cannon	France	World War I
155	Obusier de 155 mm C modèle 1881	France	World War I
155	Obusier de 155 mm C modèle 1890	France	World War I
180	18 cm kurze Kanone M 80	Austria-Hungary	World War I
203	8-inch mortar M1877	Russian Empire	World War I
209	21 cm Mörser M1880	German Empire	World War I
209	21 cm Haubitze M1891	German Empire	World War I
210	210 mm M1894	Belgium	World War I
210	210 mm gun M1939 (Br-17)	Soviet Union	World War II
210	Mortaio da 210/8 D.S.	Kingdom of Italy	World War I, World War II
210	Mortaio da 210/9 modello 1914	Kingdom of Italy	World War I
210	Paris Gun	German Empire	World War I
220	Mortier de 220 mm modèle 1880	France	World War I
220	Skoda 220 mm howitzer	Czechoslovakia	World War II
229	9-inch mortar M1877	Russian Empire	World War I
233	BL 9.2 inch Howitzer	United Kingdom	World War I
240	24 cm Mörser M 98	Austria-Hungary	pre-World War I
240	24 cm Haubitze 39	Czechoslovakia	World War II
240	Canon de 24 C modèle 1876	France	World War I
240	Canon de 240 L Mle 1884	France	World War I, World War II
240	Canon de 240 TR Mle 1903	France	World War I, World War II
240	24 cm Kanone M. 16	Austria-Hungary	World War I, World War II
240	24 cm Kanone 3	Nazi Germany	World War II
240	Type 45 240 mm howitzer	Japan	World War II
240	Type 96 24 cm howitzer	Japan	World War II
260	Mortaio da 260/9 Modello 16	Kingdom of Italy	World War I, World War II
270	Mortier de 270 mm modèle 1885	France	World War I
270	Mortier de 270 mm modèle 1889	France	World War I, World War II
280	Obice da 280	Kingdom of Italy	World War I, World War II
280	Mortier 280 mm TR de Schneider sur affût-chenilles St Chamond	France	World War II
280	28 cm howitzer L/10	Japan	Russo-Japanese War / World War I, World War II
280	11-inch mortar M1877	Russian Empire	World War I
280	11-inch gun M1877	Russian Empire	World War I
283	28 cm Haubitze L/12	German Empire	World War I, World War II
283	28 cm Haubitze L/14 i.R.	German Empire	World War I
293	Mortier de 293 Danois sur affut-truck modèle 1914	France	World War I, World War II
305	BL 12 inch Howitzer	United Kingdom	World War I
305	Type 7 30 cm Howitzer	Japan	World War II
305	Obice da 305/17	Kingdom of Italy	World War I
305	305 mm howitzer M1915	Russian Empire	World War I
305	305 mm howitzer M1939 (Br-18)	Soviet Union	World War II
305	30.5 cm M. 11 (Škoda)	Austria-Hungary	World War I
305	30.5 cm M. 16 (Škoda)	Austria-Hungary	World War I, World War II
355	35.5 cm Haubitze M1	Nazi Germany	World War II
370	Mortier de 370 modèle 1914 Filloux	France	World War I, World War II
380	38 cm Belagerungshaubitze M 16	Austria-Hungary	World War I
381	BL 15 inch Howitzer	United Kingdom	World War I
420	42 cm Gamma Mörser	German Empire	World War I, World War II
420	Big Bertha	German Empire	World War I
420	42 cm Haubitze M. 14/16	Austria-Hungary	World War I, World War II
540	Karl-Gerät 041	Nazi Germany	World War II
600	Karl-Gerät 040	Nazi Germany	World War II
800	Schwerer Gustav	Nazi Germany	World War II

== See also ==
- List of the largest cannon by caliber
