= 15 cm Kanone M 80 =

- Type: Siege gun
- Place of origin: Austria-Hungary

Service history
- In service: 1881–1918
- Used by: Austria-Hungary
- Wars: World War I

Specifications
- Mass: 3,200 kilograms (7,100 lb) (barrel only)
- Barrel length: 3.6 metres (140 in) L/24.2
- Shell: 31.5 kilograms (69 lb)
- Caliber: 150 mm
- Breech: Horizontal wedge
- Recoil: none
- Carriage: Box trail
- Maximum firing range: 8,400 metres (9,200 yd)

The 15 cm Kanone M 80 was a siege gun used by Austria-Hungary during World War I. Designed to replace the M 61 series of siege guns the M 80 family of siege guns offered greater range and armor penetration than the older guns.

The steel-bronze (92% copper bronze strengthened by autofrettage, see Franz von Uchatius) was considered inferior to steel as early as 1870s, but due to the lack of steel industry in Austria it was used for the barrel, and the iron carriage lacked any system to absorb recoil other than the traditional recoil wedges placed underneath and behind the wheels of the carriage. These wedges helped to absorb the recoil force and encouraged the wheels to run forward to bring the gun back into battery. Generally a wooden firing platform was constructed for these guns in action to provide a level and smooth surface. Shortly after these guns were adopted a hydraulic recoil cylinder was adapted to absorb the recoil forces. It was attached to the underside of the carriage and the firing platform. For transport the barrel was removed from the carriage by a crane and carried separately.

These siege guns were no longer useful against modern armored fortresses by the outbreak of World War I and many saw action in the field to fill the need for heavy artillery.

== Bibliography ==
- Ortner, M. Christian (2007). The Austro-Hungarian Artillery From 1867 to 1918: Technology, Organization, and Tactics. Vienna: Verlag Militaria. ISBN 978-3-902526-13-7.
- Łukasz Chrzanowski (2008). Artyleria Austro-Węgierska 1860-1890 (in Polish). Przemyśl, Wydawnictwo: FORT. ISBN 978-83-923657-7-8.
