= 24 cm Kanone 3 =

WW2 German siege gun

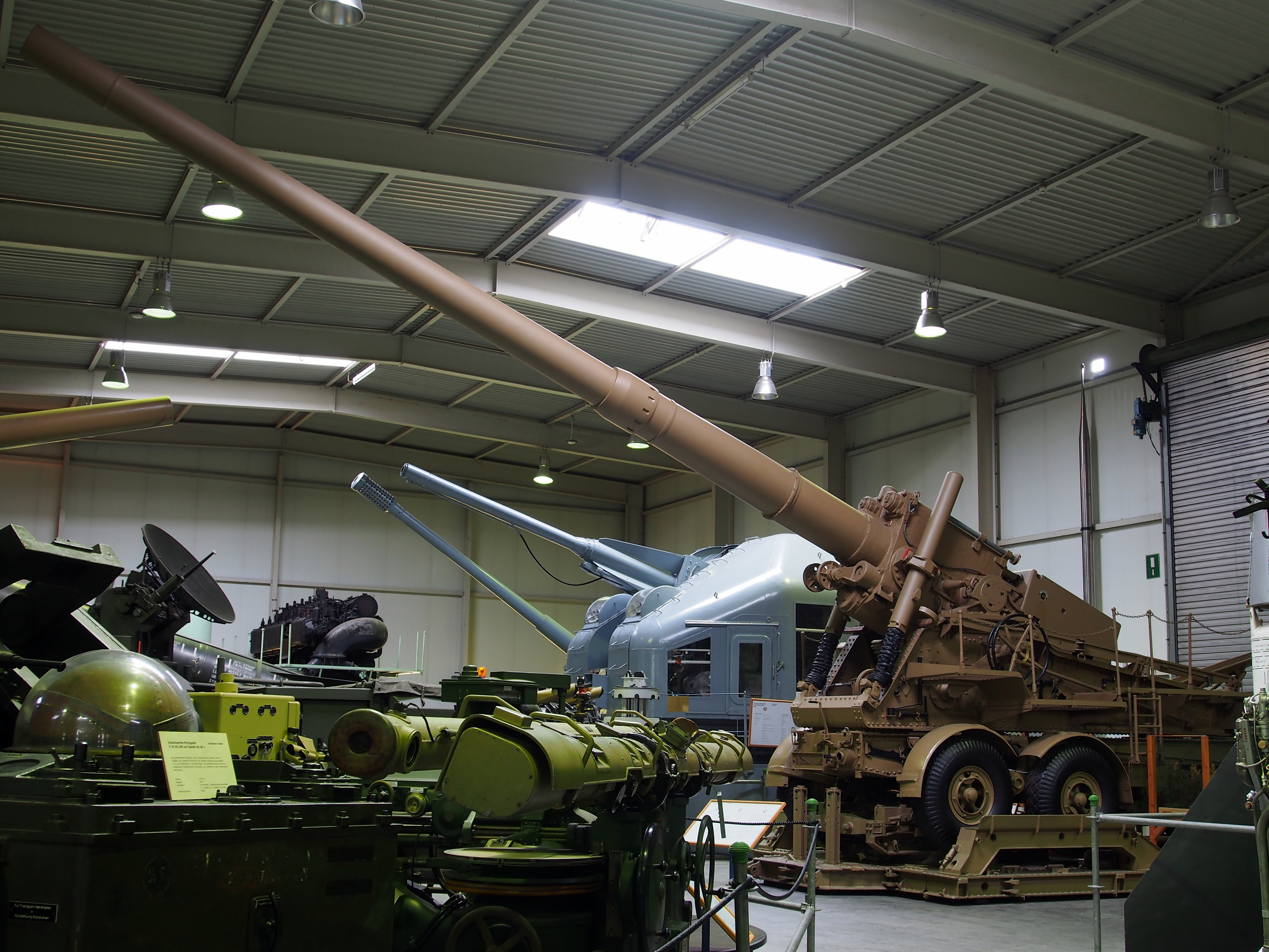
- A K 3 in the Wehrtechnische Studiensammlung Koblenz
- Type: Heavy Siege Gun
- Place of origin: Germany

Service history
- In service: 1939–45
- Used by: Nazi Germany
- Wars: World War II

Production history
- Designer: Rheinmetall
- Designed: 1935–38
- Manufacturer: Krupp
- Produced: 1938–44
- No. built: 14+

Specifications
- Mass: 54,866 kg (120,959 lb)
- Barrel length: 13.102 m (40 ft)
- Shell weight: 151.4 kg (334 lb) (HE)
- Caliber: 238 millimetres (9.4 in)
- Breech: horizontal sliding-block
- Recoil: dual-recoil hydro-pneumatic
- Carriage: Box trail
- Elevation: 0° to +56°
- Traverse: 6° on carriage 360° on platform
- Rate of fire: 1 rd per 4–5 min
- Muzzle velocity: 970 m/s (3,182 ft/s)
- Maximum firing range: 37 km (23 mi)

The 24-cm-Kanone 3 (24 cm K 3) was a German heavy siege gun used in the Second World War by the first battalion of Artillerie-Regiment 84. Four were in service when Germany invaded Poland, assigned to the first two batteries of I./AR 84, and in the Battle of France. After the Battle of France, a third battery with two additional guns was formed. With six guns, the battalion was designated to provide artillery support for the planned invasion of England (Operation Sea Lion). By Operation Barbarossa all three batteries were equipped with two guns apiece. This situation did not change for the next two years.

== Design and history ==
The gun for the K 3 was of standard construction while the carriage was considerably more innovative. Rheinmetall placed a lot of emphasis on ease of assembly. It did not require a crane because it used electric winches, mounted on the carriage, to pull various parts through a system of inclined ramps, guide rails and runways. It also used the Rheinmetall's dual-recoil system, first seen on the 21 cm Mörser 18. The barrel recoiled normally in its cradle, but, in addition, the whole top carriage, which carried the barrel and its cradle, recoiled across the main part of the carriage. This system damped out the recoil forces and made for a very steady firing platform.

The K 3 was transported in six loads consisting of the firing platform, carriage, cradle, barrel, breech and an electric generator.

The Wehrmacht was not content with the gun's performance: "It was felt to be wasteful of time and manpower, the transport arrangements were cumbersome and the performance was not considered to be commensurate with the size of weapon." These led to experiments by Krupp and Rheinmetall to extend the range. These included "pre-grooved" projectiles which showed no significant improvement, squeeze-bore, discarding sabot and even a smoothbore version. None of these reached beyond the experimental stage.

The Bundeswehr Museum of German Defense Technology in Koblenz has one of these cannons in its collection.
