= 12-cm Kanone M 80 =

Austro-Hungarian light siege gun of World War I

12 cm Kanone M 80
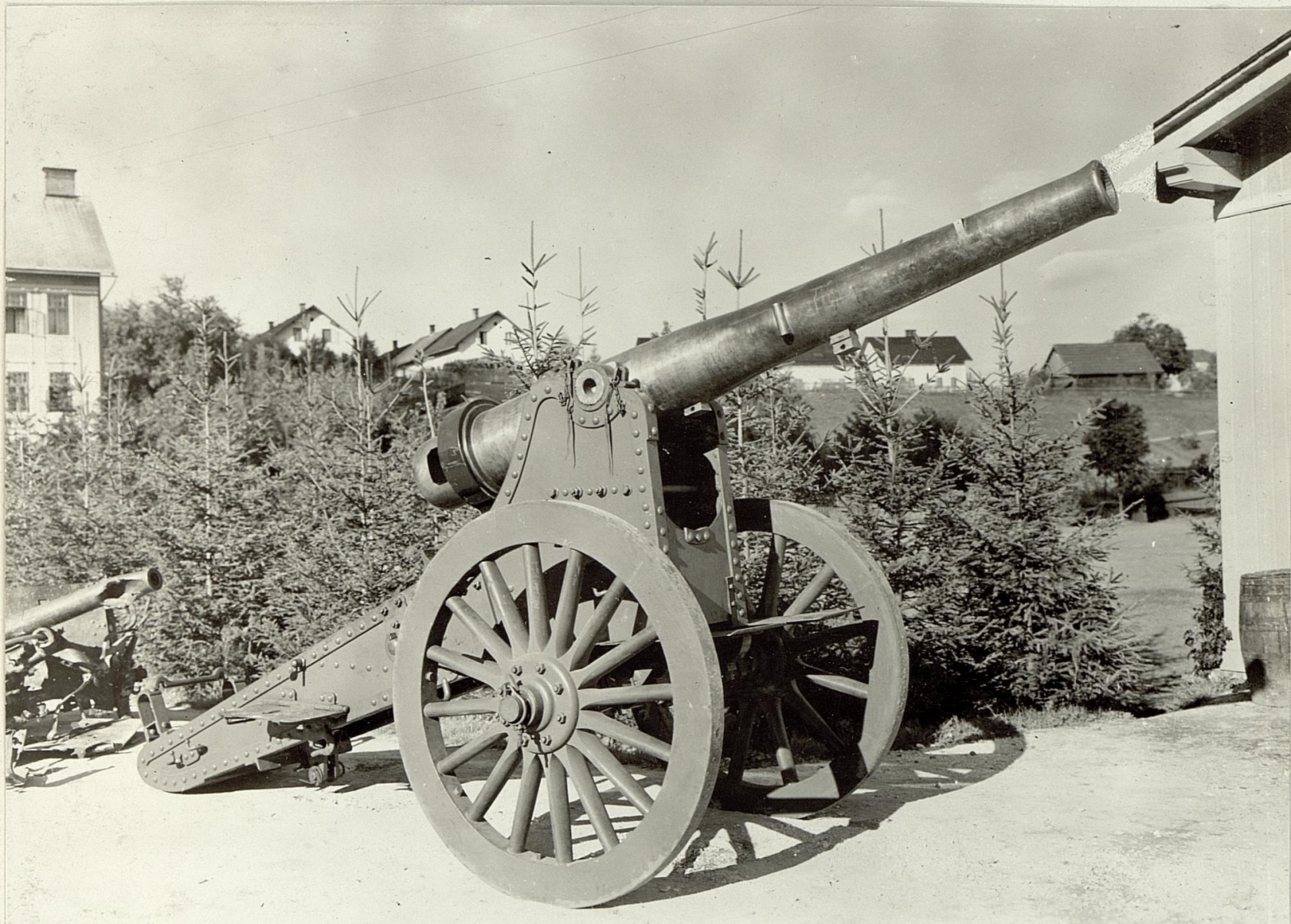
- 12 cm Kanone M 80
- Type: Siege gun
- Place of origin: Austria-Hungary

Service history
- In service: 1881–1918
- Used by: Austria-Hungary
- Wars: World War I

Specifications
- Mass: 1,700 kilograms (3,700 lb)
- Barrel length: 3.2 metres (130 in) L/26.6
- Shell: 19.8 kilograms (44 lb)
- Caliber: 120 mm
- Breech: Horizontal wedge
- Carriage: Box trail
- Maximum firing range: 7,900 metres (8,600 yd)

The 12 cm Kanone M 80 was a light siege gun used by Austria-Hungary during World War I. It was developed to replace the 12 cm M 61 series of siege guns and offered greater range and penetration than its predecessors.

The gun's barrel was made of steel-bronze, a material associated with the work of Franz von Uchatius. Although steel was considered superior to steel-bronze by the 1870s, Austria-Hungary's limited steel production capacity contributed to the continued use of steel-bronze for artillery barrels. The gun was originally mounted on an iron carriage without a dedicated recoil-absorption system. Recoil was initially controlled by wedges placed underneath and behind the carriage wheels, which helped return the gun to its firing position. A wooden firing platform was generally constructed to provide a level and stable surface for the gun. A hydraulic recoil mechanism was later fitted beneath the carriage and connected to the firing platform to absorb recoil forces.

For transport, the barrel was removed from the carriage using a crane and transported separately.

Although the 12 cm Kanone M 80 was designed for use against fortifications, it was largely ineffective against modern armoured fortifications by the outbreak of World War I. Its relatively light weight and long range nevertheless made it useful as a field artillery piece, where it could provide long-range fire support.

== Bibliography ==
- Ortner, M. Christian. The Austro-Hungarian Artillery From 1867 to 1918: Technology, Organization, and Tactics. Vienna, Verlag Militaria, 2007 ISBN 978-3-902526-13-7
- Łukasz Chrzanowski "Artyleria Austro-Węgierska 1860-1890" Przemyśl, Wydawnictwo FORT, 2008, ISBN 978-83-923657-7-8
