= 6-inch siege gun M1904 =

6-inch siege gun model 1904
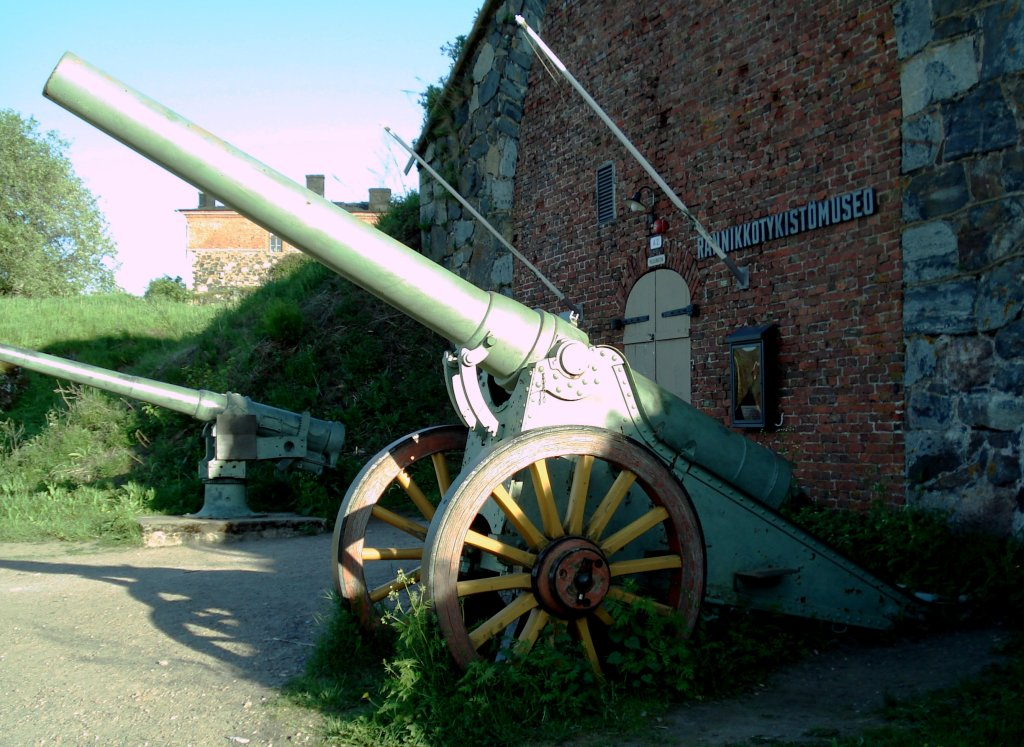
- Russian siege gun model 1904 displayed in front of Coastal Artillery Museum in Suomenlinna fortress, Helsinki.
- Type: Siege gun
- Place of origin: Russian Empire

Specifications
- Mass: combat: 5,437 kg (11,987 lb)
- Barrel length: 30 calibers
- Caliber: 152.4 mm (6.00 in)
- Carriage: Box trail
- Elevation: -3.5° to 40.2°
- Muzzle velocity: 623 m/s (2,040 ft/s)
- Maximum firing range: 14.2 km (8.8 mi)

6-inch siege gun model 1904 (Russian: 6-дюймовая осадная пушка образца 1904 года) was a Russian 152.4 mm heavy siege gun. It was produced by Perm Works, with a total of about 200 pieces having been built.

The gun was utilized in World War I, Russian Civil War and some conflicts of the early 20th century where former parts of Russian Empire were involved. It remained in the Red Army inventory, but from early 1930s was being gradually replaced by newer 152-mm gun M1910/30 and 152-mm gun M1910/34 and was retired for good after the 152-mm howitzer-gun model 1937 (ML-20) was adopted.

A few guns were captured by Finland in the Civil War. Those pieces were also apparently used in the Winter War and the Continuation War.

Surviving pieces can be seen in Hämeenlinna and Suomenlinna Artillery Museums, Finland, in the military museum in Brussels, Belgium and in several French fortresses.

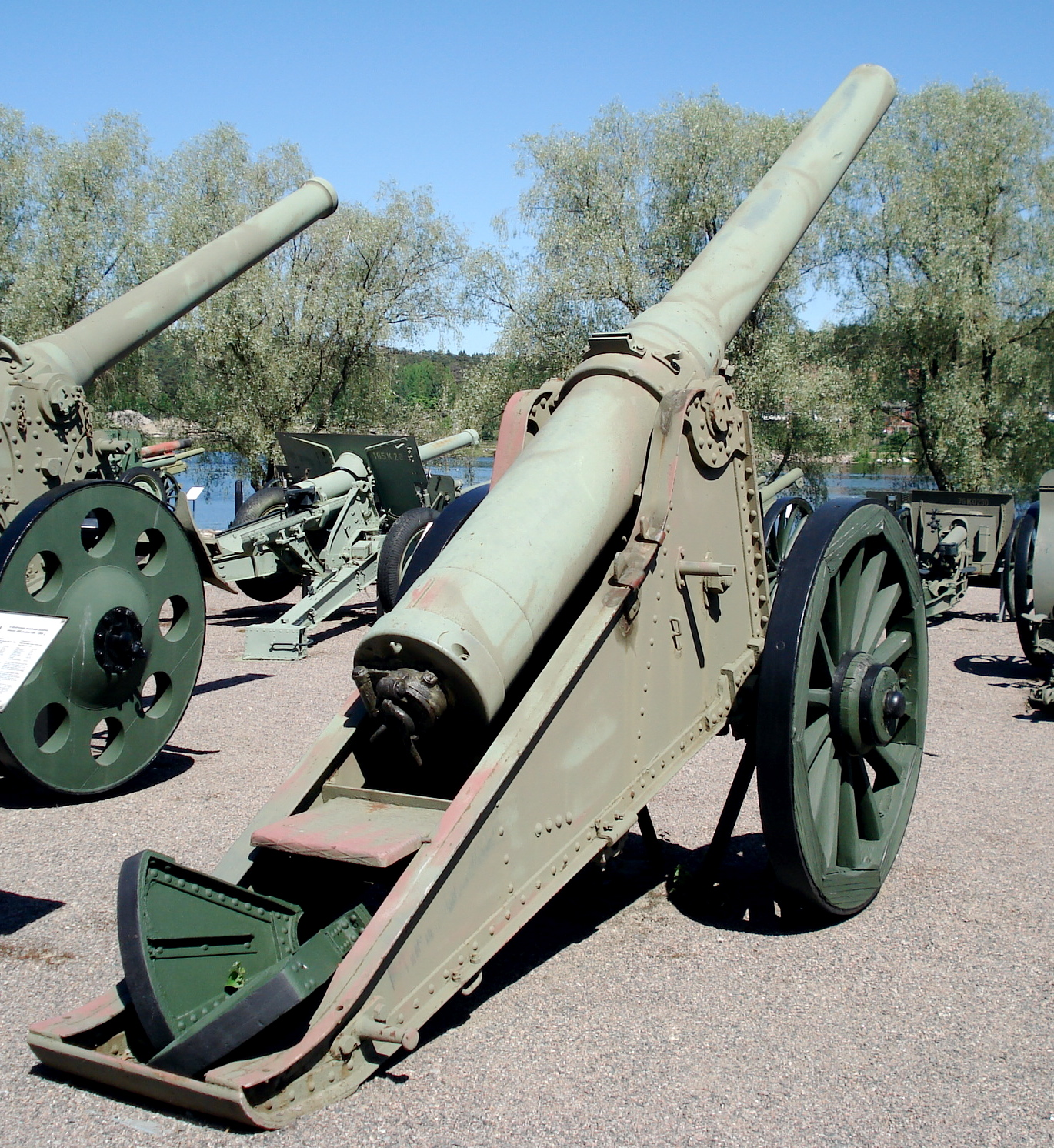
6-inch siege gun M1904 in Hämeenlinna Finnish Artillery Museum.
