= Interrupted screw =

Mechanical device used to effect a closure using a partial rotation

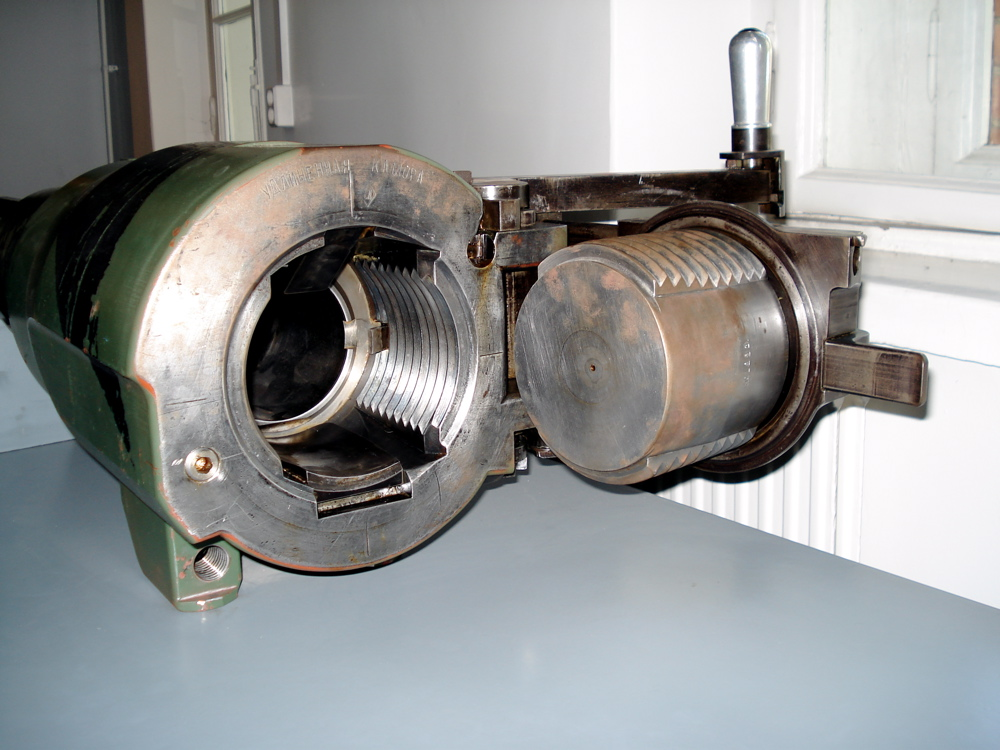
Breech from Russian 122 mm M1910 howitzer, modified and combined with 105 mm H37 howitzer barrel

An interrupted screw or interrupted thread is a mechanical device typically used in the breech of artillery guns. It is believed to have been invented in 1845.

The system has also been used to close other devices, including the joint between helmet (bonnet) and breastplate (corselet) of standard diving suit helmets, and the locks of diving chambers. Interrupted thread mounting is also used for large instrumentation lenses for high-speed cameras such as the Photo-Sonics 10B.

== Design ==
An interrupted screw has a section of thread along its axis removed. The screw is mated with a partially threaded hole in the receptacle: threadless channels in the breechblock screw line up with the threaded parts of the receptacle, and vice versa. The screw can thus be smoothly inserted all the way into the receptacle, after which as little as one-eighth of a turn can engage the two sets of threads securely, sealing the joint.

The amount of rotation required to achieve full closure depends on the number of unthreaded sectors. The minimum balanced arrangement has two sectors of 90°, and requires 1/4 turn to lock. three sectors of 60° requires 1/6 turn to lock, and the typical arrangement on a diving helmet, four sectors of 45°, requires 1/8 turn to lock.

== Applications ==
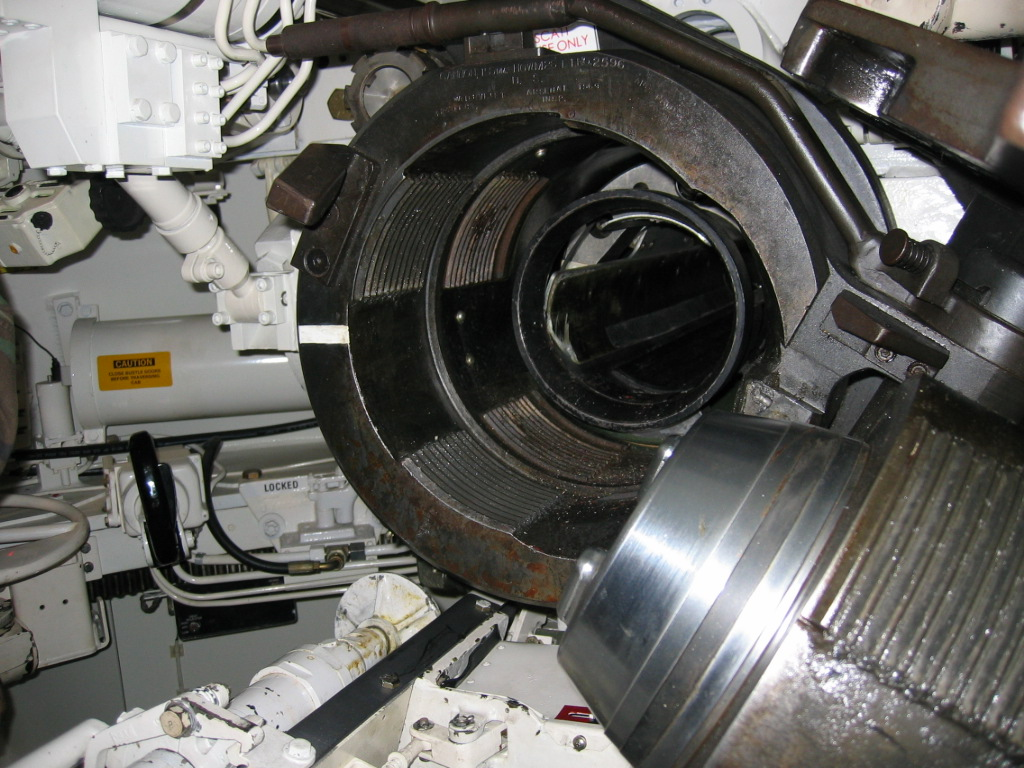
M109 howitzer breech plug

Interrupted screw of M109A6.

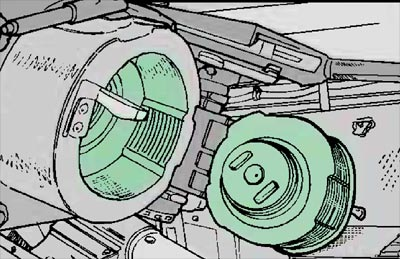
Illustration of M109 breech plug

In the artillery application, the screw is set into the breechblock and mated with a partially threaded hole at the rear of the weapon's chamber.

American engraver Benjamin Chambers, Sr. received a patent in 1849 for a wrought iron built-up gun "dissected screw breech" with "sectional screws" "cut therein for the purpose of speedily opening the breech for swabbing, depositing the load, and readily closing it again when the gun is to be discharged". His gun was built and tested with metallic cartridges, center-primed with a percussion cap, because the US Navy was initially interested, and chief of the Bureau of Ordnance Charles Morris recommended more developments, but the system was too expensive for the time and cheaper Dahlgren guns were adopted instead.

Breech sealing was improved with the de Bange obturator in 1872, and all interrupted screw breeches with this system were generally known as the De Bange type.

== Weakness ==
The major weakness of the original designs was that only half of the circumference of the breechblock could be threaded, hence a fairly long breechblock was still required to achieve a secure lock. Axel Welin solved this problem with his stepped interrupted screw design: the Welin screw breech of 1890. This design has threads of the block and breech cut in steps of successively larger radius. For example, this allows a breech screw with three steps to allow three-quarters of the block circumference to be threaded, allowing for a much shorter breechblock while still requiring only one-quarter of a turn to open or close. This is the basic design still in use with bagged charge artillery.

Interrupted screws are occasionally seen in loose gunpowder rifles, as this mechanism was historically one of the few practical ways to achieve a gas-proof seal with a breech-loading firearm that does not employ metallic cartridges. An earlier method was the use of a wedge to block the rear of the gun. The interrupted screw arrangement enables more precise and repeatable lock up in-battery position, increasing accuracy on high powered sniper rifles.

The system has also been used to close other applications, including the joint between helmet (bonnet) and breastplate (corselet) of standard diving suit helmets, and the locks of diving chambers.

== See also ==
- Locked breech
- Rotating bolt

=== Firearms using the Interrupted screw ===
- FN CAL
- Heckler & Koch SLB 2000
- Jingal wall gun
- McClean automatic rifle
- Newton rifle
- Remington Model 760
- Thompson Autorifle
- Thorneycroft carbine
- Walther WA2000
- Weatherby rifle
- Browning BAR
- Browning BLR
