= Hydraulic recoil mechanism =

Recoil-reducing device

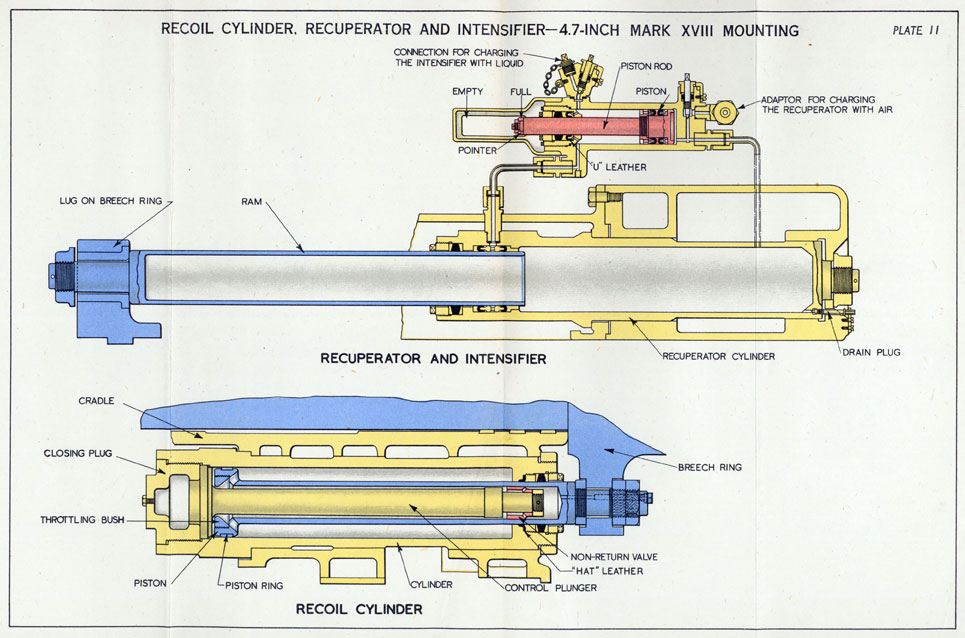
Pneumatic recuperator and hydraulic recoil cylinder arrangement of QF 4.7 inch naval gun, World War II

A hydraulic recoil mechanism is a way of limiting the effects of recoil and adding to the accuracy and firepower of an artillery piece.

== Description ==
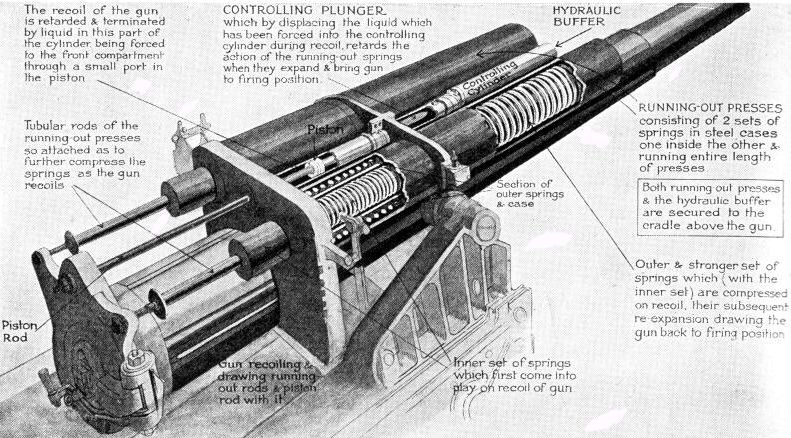
Diagram of recoil mechanism, British 60-pounder gun Mk.I, 1916

The idea of using a water brake to counteract the recoil of naval cannons was first suggested to the British Admiralty by Carl Wilhelm Siemens in the early 1870s, but it took about a decade for the idea to be commercialized, primarily by Josiah Vavasseur.

The usual recoil system in modern quick-firing guns is the hydro-pneumatic recoil system. In this system, the barrel is mounted on rails on which it can recoil to the rear, and the recoil is taken up by a cylinder which is similar in operation to an automotive gas-charged shock absorber. It is commonly mounted parallel to the barrel, but is shorter and smaller. The cylinder is charged with compressed air, as well as hydraulic oil; in operation, the barrel's energy is taken up in compressing the air as the barrel recoils backward, then is dissipated via hydraulic damping as the barrel returns forward to the firing position. The recoil impulse is thus spread out over the time in which the barrel is compressing the air, rather than the much narrower interval of time when the projectile is being fired. This greatly reduces the peak force conveyed to the mount (or to the ground on which the gun is emplaced).

== See also ==
- Canon de 75 modèle 1897, the first field gun employing the mechanism
- List of British ordnance terms
