= BL 9.2-inch howitzer =

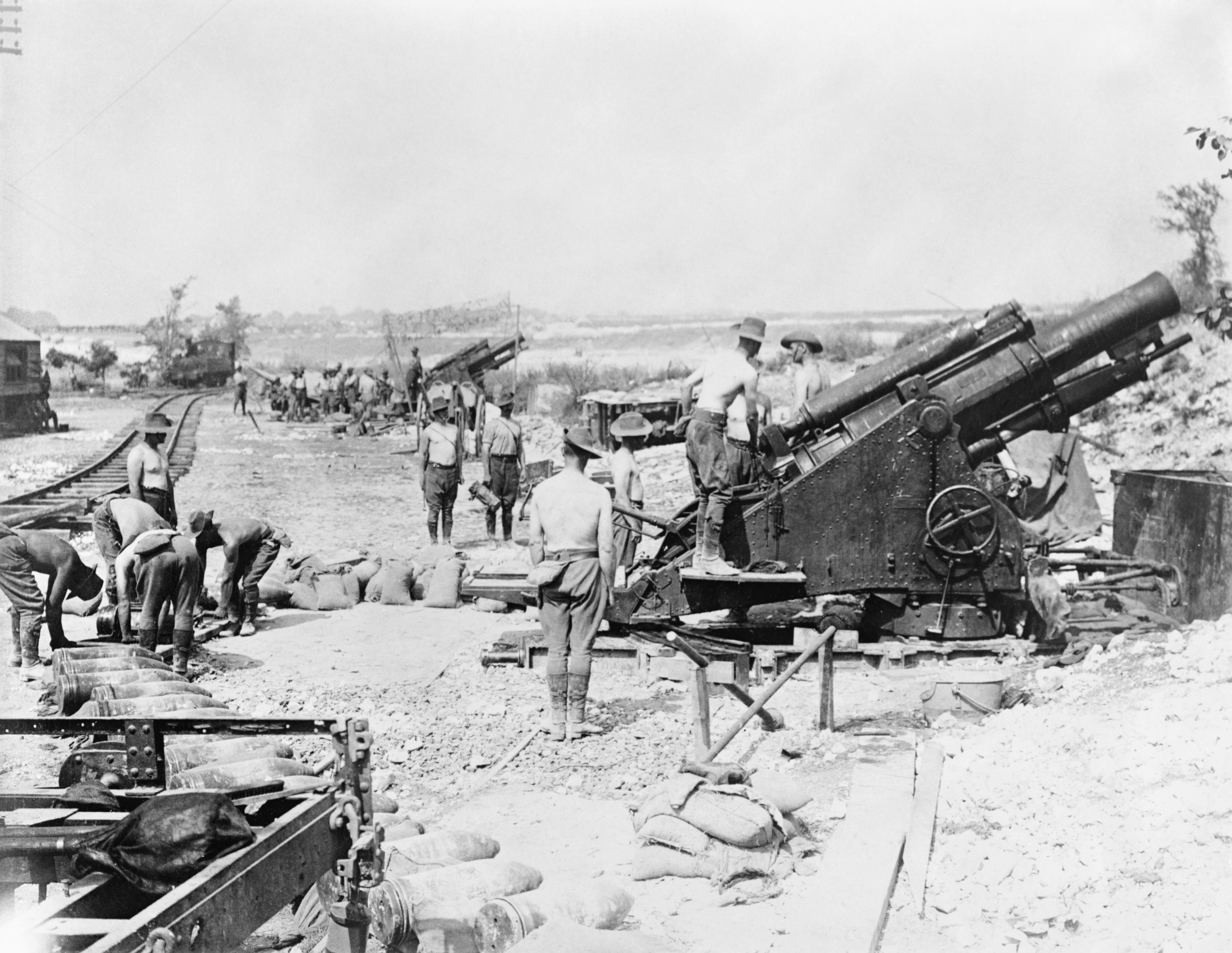
- Australian Battery of 9.2 inch Mark I howitzers in action at Fricourt during the Battle of the Somme, August 1916.
- Type: Heavy siege howitzer
- Place of origin: United Kingdom of Great Britain and Ireland

Service history
- In service: 1914–1919
- Used by: United Kingdom; Australia; Canada; United States; Belgium; Russian Empire
- Wars: World War I

Production history
- Designer: Mk I: Coventry Ordnance Works; Mk II: Vickers
- Designed: 1913
- Manufacturer: Vickers, Bethlehem Steel
- Produced: 1914–1918
- No. built: All Mks equivalent to 632 complete equipments plus 43 ordnances (UK contracts)
- Variants: Mk I, Mk II

Specifications
- Mass: Mk II Body, cradle & ordnance only 5 tons 17 cwt
- Barrel length: 10 ft 1 in (3 m) (Mk I); 13 ft 3 in (4 m) (Mk II)
- Shell: HE 290 lb (130 kg)
- Caliber: 9.2-inch (233.7 mm)
- Breech: Welin breech block with Smith-Asbury mechanism
- Recoil: Variable Hydro-pneumatic; 23-40 inches (MK I); 20-44 inches (MK II)
- Carriage: Siege carriage
- Elevation: 15°–55° (Mk I); 15°–50° (Mk II)
- Traverse: 30° L & R
- Muzzle velocity: 1,187 ft/s (362 m/s) (Mk I); 1,600 ft/s (490 m/s) (Mk II)
- Maximum firing range: 10,060 yd (9,200 m) (Mk. I); 13,935 yd (12,742 m) (Mk. II)

The Ordnance BL 9.2-inch howitzer was a heavy siege howitzer that formed the principal counter-battery equipment of British forces in France in World War I. It equipped a substantial number of siege batteries of the Royal Garrison Artillery. During World War II a limited number were used in the Battle of France, with the remainder being kept in the United Kingdom.

== History ==
The origins of a British heavy "siege" howitzer lie in advances in technology and the 21 cm howitzers used by the German field army. UK had purchased Skoda 9.45-inch howitzers from Austria in 1900 for service in South Africa. A practice camp in the 1900s showed this howitzer's high minimum elevation was a major problem. In due course Britain decided to develop its own heavy weapon, but retained the Skoda transport technique of moving it in three loads on wheeled trailers (either horse- or tractor-towed). A trial gun was received in 1913 and fired at Woolwich and Shoeburyness during the winter. In July 1914 it was sent to the tactical firing range at Rhayader with a siege company. The assessment was "This equipment is a vast improvement on any other in use in the siege artillery, and is worth taking with an army." Major General von Donop, Master-General of the Ordnance, immediately ordered 16 guns and a further 16 were ordered in October 1914. The prototype gun, "Mother", was in action in France on 31 October 1914 and production guns entered service in 1915.

The gun was transported in three loads – body and cradle, bed, barrel – towed by either heavy horses or a Holt 75 tractor. The equipment featured a segment shaped ground platform assembled from steel section and bolted to a holdfast sunk flush with the ground. An earth box fitted above ground to the front of the holdfast, with 9 long tons (9,100 kg) (Mk 1) or 11 long tons (11,200 kg) (Mk 2) of earth prevented it "bucking". On soft ground, extra beams were used under the holdfast. The carriage was mounted on the platform, it was pivoted at the front and traversed up to 30 degrees left and right by a spur gear engaging a curved toothed rack at the breech end of the platform, with the weight of the carriage on rollers.

The tubular cradle pivoted by the trunnions supported the barrel – a wire bound A tube – and connected it to the hydro-pneumatic recoil system with a floating piston (the first British use of this) and hydraulic buffer. The initial design suffered from excessive recoil and was modified in 1916. In 1917 the recoil was further improved by addition of a recoil indicator and cut-off gear. Full recoil (40-inch Mk I, 44-inch Mk II) was allowed at lower elevation, hence absorbing most of the horizontal (i.e. backward) force. A shorter recoil (23-inch Mk I, 20-inch Mk II) was allowed at high elevation where the ground itself could absorb much of the vertical (i.e. downward) recoil force. This prevented the breech from hitting the platform. The barrel had to be depressed 3° for loading, as can be seen in the photograph, shown below, of a howitzer of the Australian 55th Siege Battery.

=== Mark II ===
The Mk I's range was relatively limited and in June 1916 the senior Artillery commander in France, Major General Birch, (Note: The MGRA, Major-General, Royal Artillery) requested among other artillery improvements an increase in range to 15,000 yards (14,000 m) "even if an increase of the weight of the equipment is entailed". This resulted in the Mark II gun in December 1916, with a heavier maximum propellant charge, a longer barrel and an increased range of 13,935 yards (12,742 m). Combat experience showed the higher-velocity Mk II barrel had a reduced life, estimated at 3,500 rounds, compared to 6,000 rounds for the Mk I.

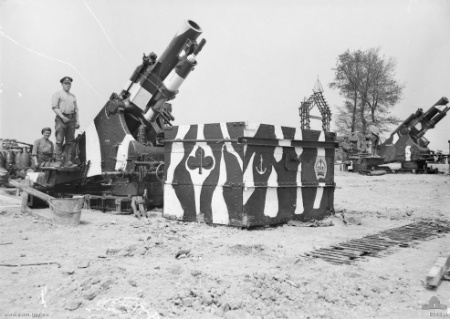
Two Mk I howitzers supporting Australian troops near Corbie, May 1918, showing the earth box.

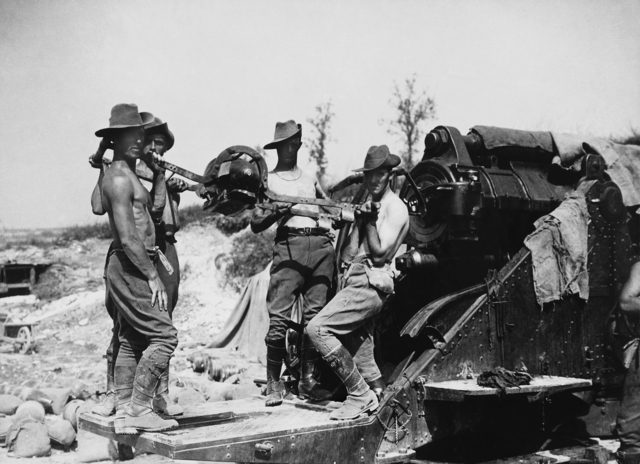
Australian gunners of the 55th Siege Artillery Battery loading a 9.2-inch howitzer, Western Front, July 1916.

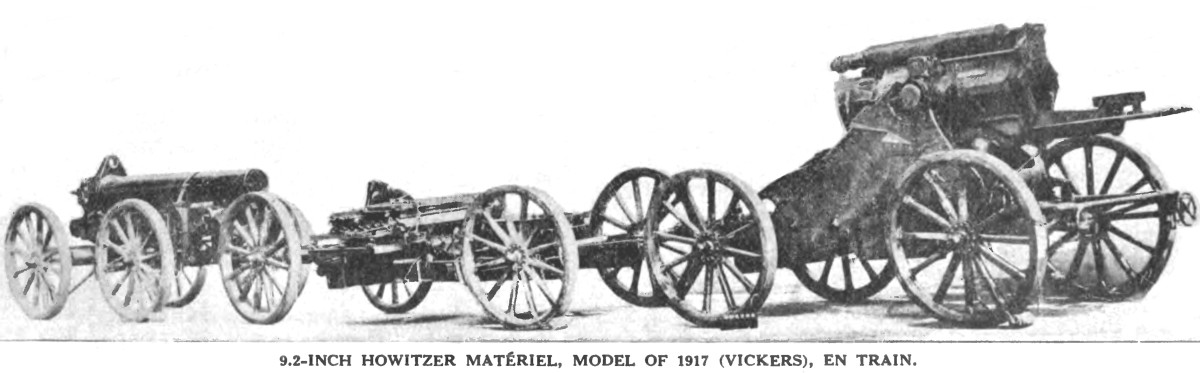
Transport (L-R) of barrel, bed, cradle & body

== Combat use ==
A disadvantage of the dismantling system was an inability to fire directly from the travelling carriage the way the BL 8-inch howitzer could. Thirty-six hours were normally required to dismount a gun from its travelling configuration and set it up for firing. (During the Battle of Arras one crew succeeded in dismounting they gun at 10.00 pm one evening, hauling it forward about 2 miles (3.2 km) by caterpillar tractor over shell-pitted road impassable to other motor vehicles, and having it in action at 05.00 am next day, a feat that even the battery commander had considered impossible.) This mobility disadvantage was offset by the stability of the siege mounting which made it "the most accurate of heavy howitzers".

In World War I British service, the gun served only on the Western Front with 36 British, one Australian and two Canadian batteries. Batteries increased in size from four guns to six during 1916–17. Initially, batteries were in Heavy Artillery Groups – usually a single battery of 9.2-inch with a varying number of batteries of other calibres. In January 1918 the groups were converted to permanent Brigades, RGA, in which a 'Howitzer, 9.2-inch' brigade comprised one 9.2-inch battery and three equipped with 6-inch howitzers. In October 1918, during the final pursuit of the defeated German Army, most of the siege batteries had to be left behind because of difficulties of transporting heavy guns and their ammunition. An ad hoc brigade ('Christian's Brigade') was formed by XIII Corps' Heavy Artillery, consisting of two batteries of Mark II 9.2-inch howitzers and one of 8-inch howitzers, with orders to 'keep up with the hunt'. These heavy howitzers advanced as close behind the infantry as they could, giving supporting fire until 7 November, when the state of the roads made further advance impossible.

During World War II, some guns went to France with the British Expeditionary Force, but their main deployment was in the United Kingdom as anti-invasion defences. According to the post-war memoirs of comedian Spike Milligan, who served in the Royal Artillery's 56th Heavy Regiment, 9.2-inch howitzer ammunition was so scarce in the early years of the Second World War that gun-crews in training were reduced to shouting "bang" in unison, as no shells were available to practice with. (Note: The regiment's guns were later replaced with BL 7.2-inch howitzers.)

Excerpt from US Army Signal Corps film America Goes Over (1918) showing a howitzer in action.

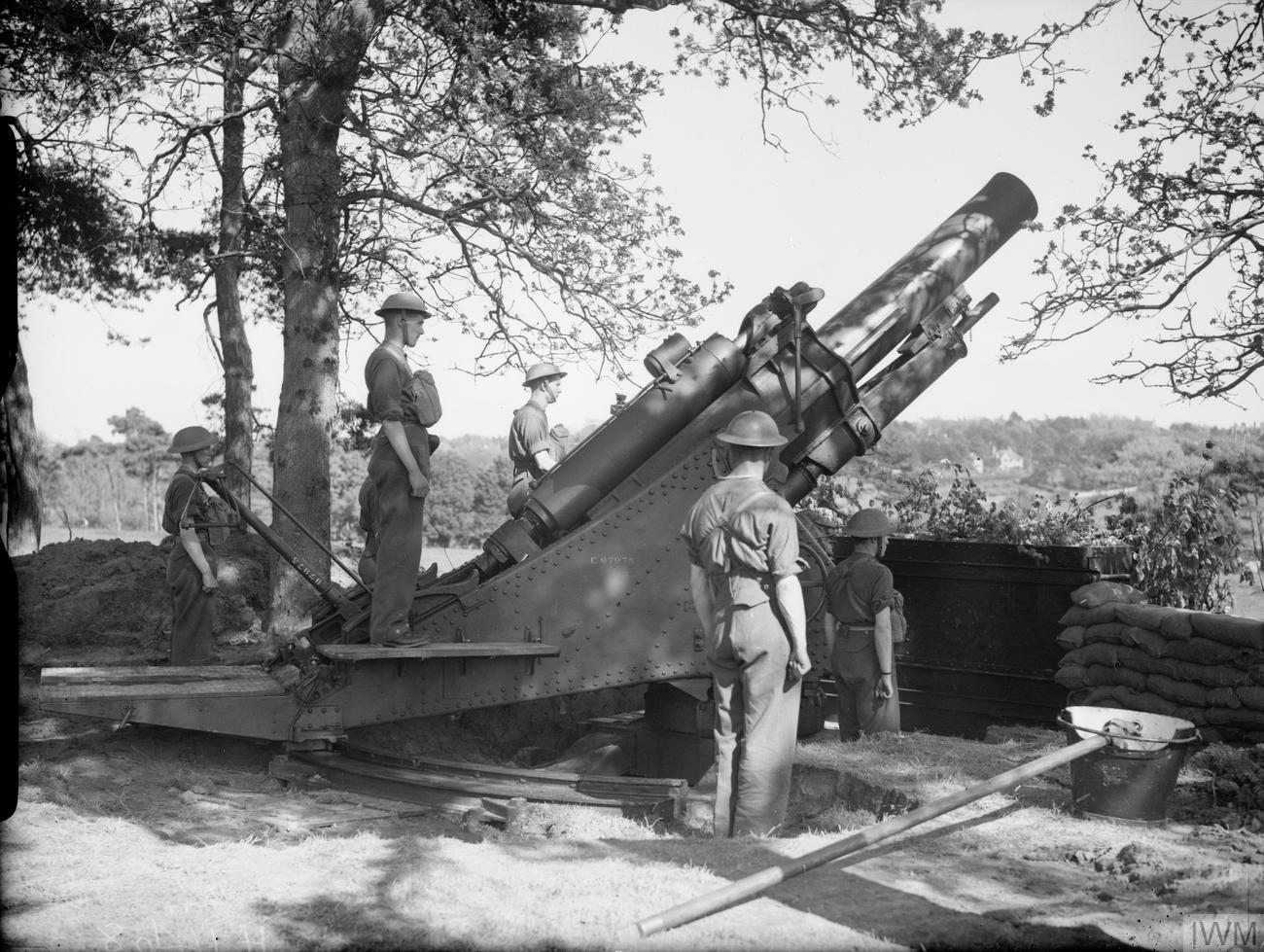
Gunners of 56th Heavy Regiment with Mk II, May 1940

== US service ==
Bethlehem Steel was already contracted to manufacture 9.2-inch howitzers for Britain before the US entry into World War I in April 1917. The order was to be completed by July 1917, but they failed to meet the contract timescale and a year later deliveries had not been completed. As British manufacturing capacity increased, guns became available for export. The US government ordered 100 from Bethlehem and 132 from Britain to equip the American Expeditionary Forces building up in France. One source states that Bethlehem did not reach production on the US order but that 40 were delivered from Britain by the end of the war.

The US Ordnance manual of 1920 describes its current stock of Model of 1917 (Vickers Mk I) and Model of 1918 (Vickers Mk II) as being built both in Britain and the USA. The US-built guns may have been British orders to Bethlehem which were redirected to the US Army.

One source describes the US acquisition of the 9.2 as based mainly on the need at the time to utilize immediately available manufacturing capacities, and that development of a 240-mm howitzer based on the French Schneider 280-mm mortar for its super-heavy artillery was the main US goal. This view is supported by the 1920 US Ordnance manual which describes the 240 mm howitzer as far superior to the 9.2.

The US 65th Artillery Regiment, Coast Artillery Corps (CAC), was in action with 9.2-inch howitzers in World War I. Also equipped with or slated for this weapon, the 72nd Artillery (CAC) was almost ready for the front and the 50th Artillery (CAC) was in France but had not commenced training at the time of the Armistice. Each regiment had an authorised strength of 24 guns.

Following the war, the total US stock of 45 9.2-inch weapons was moved to the US and placed in reserve. In April 1919, 40 of them were placed at coast defence installations for gun loading training. In 1923, these guns, plus the five others and 45,000 shells, were withdrawn to war reserve storage. In 1926 the 9.2 was listed for disposal. Five gun tubes survive in the United States as war memorials.

== Russian and Soviet service ==
Only four out of 44 9.2-inch howitzers promised by the allies ended up in the service of the Russian Empire. These four pieces were actually given by Japan in 1917. The Russian designation for the gun was 234-mm Vickers howitzer. An ammunition tally on 15 September 1917 showed 1,110 rounds per gun available in the Russian arsenal. There was however no local production of this ammunition, all had to be imported.

Three of the guns were still in service with the Soviet 317th artillery battalion, part of the 13th Army in the Winter War, when they were employed against the Mannerheim Line.

== Ammunition ==
The primary ammunition was HE (high explosive) shells filled with Amatol, Trotyl (TNT) or Lyddite. The standard shell weight was 290 pounds (130 kg), with 19 variants of HE shell, some with sub-variants. Later marks of shell had a fill that varied between about 25 and 40 pounds (11 and 18 kg) of HE, and shell bodies varying in length between 28 and 32 inches (71 and 81 cm). There was also some use of Common Pointed shell filled with Shellite. Later fuses included various versions of No 101, 106 and 188. More than three million rounds of ammunition were expended during the war.

Chemical shells were introduced in 1918, these were filled with mustard gas, a persistent chemical agent. However, only 7000 shells were produced.

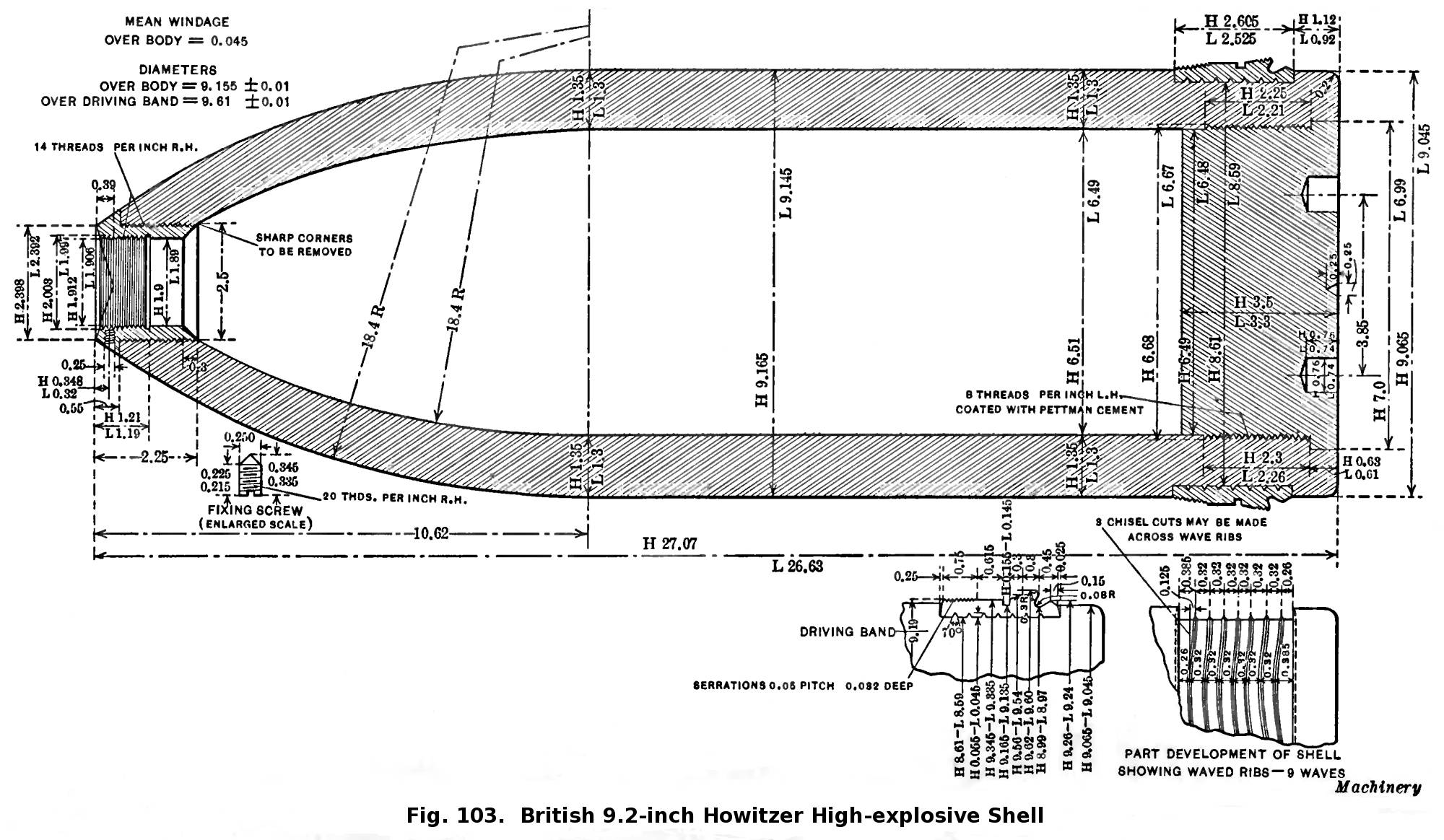
Mk II HE shell

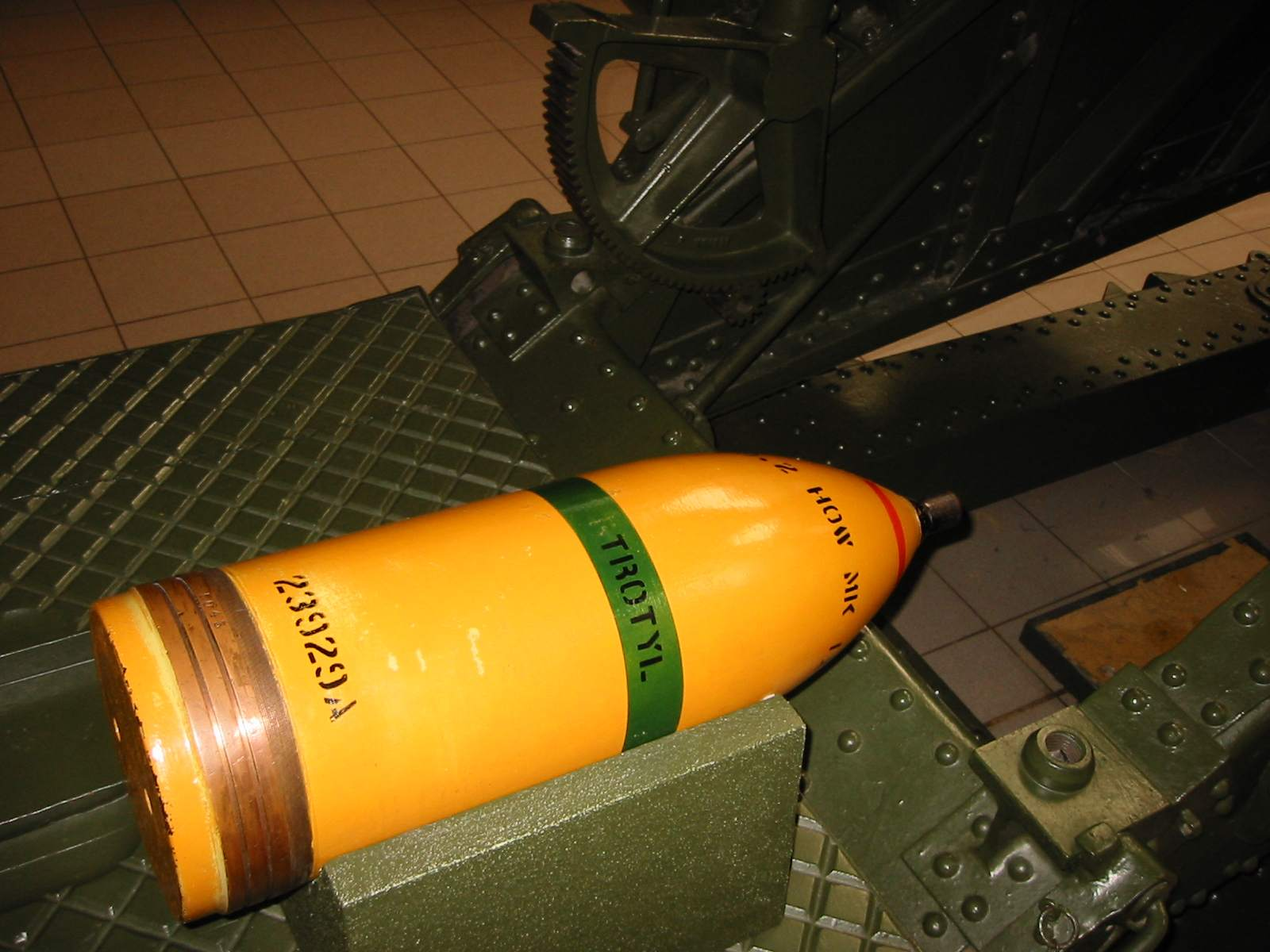
A Mk I Trotyl (TNT) shell on the loading platform of "Mother" at the Imperial War Museum, London.

== Surviving examples ==
=== Imperial War Museum ===
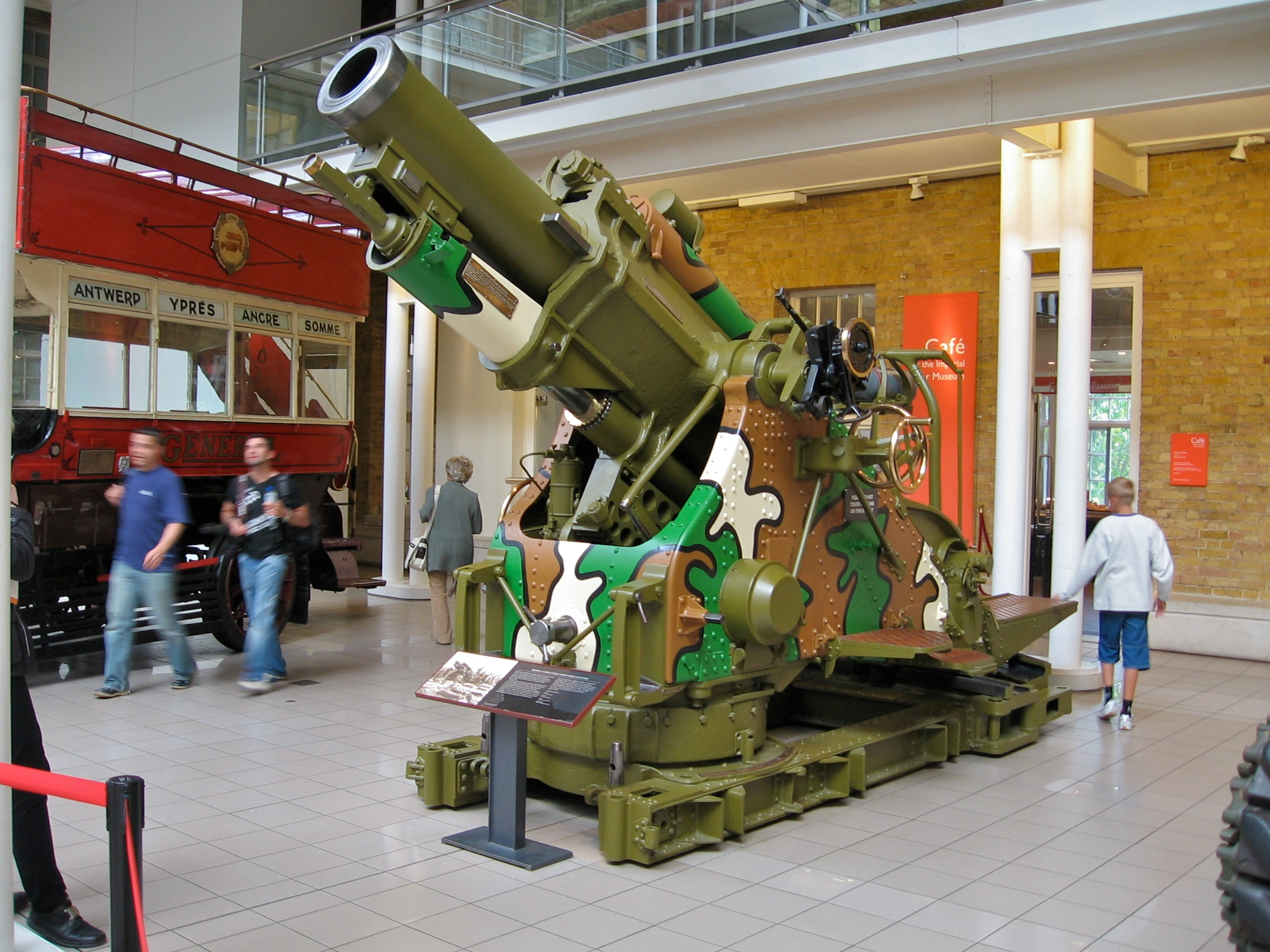
The prototype "Mother" gun barrel on Mk I production mounting at the Imperial War Museum, London.

The barrel of the original prototype, known as 'Mother' is preserved on a Mk I carriage by the Imperial War Museum. This howitzer was tested at Rhayader in Powys, Wales in July 1914. Sent to France, it was operated by 8th Siege Battery from October 1914. The howitzer was visited by Field Marshal Sir John French on 5 November 1914 and by the Prince of Wales on 18 November. Transferred to 10th Siege Battery in early 1915 it saw use during the battles of Neuve Chapelle in March 1915 and Festubert in May 1915. The weapon returned to Britain in July 1915 and was fired at the Shoeburyness ranges until worn out. With its barrel relined, it was reissued to France in 1917.

Acquired by the Imperial War Museum, the howitzer was exhibited at Crystal Palace, from 1920 and at South Kensington from 1924. Around this time, the howitzer served as the model for the Royal Artillery Memorial designed by Charles Sargeant Jagger.

=== Australian War Memorial ===
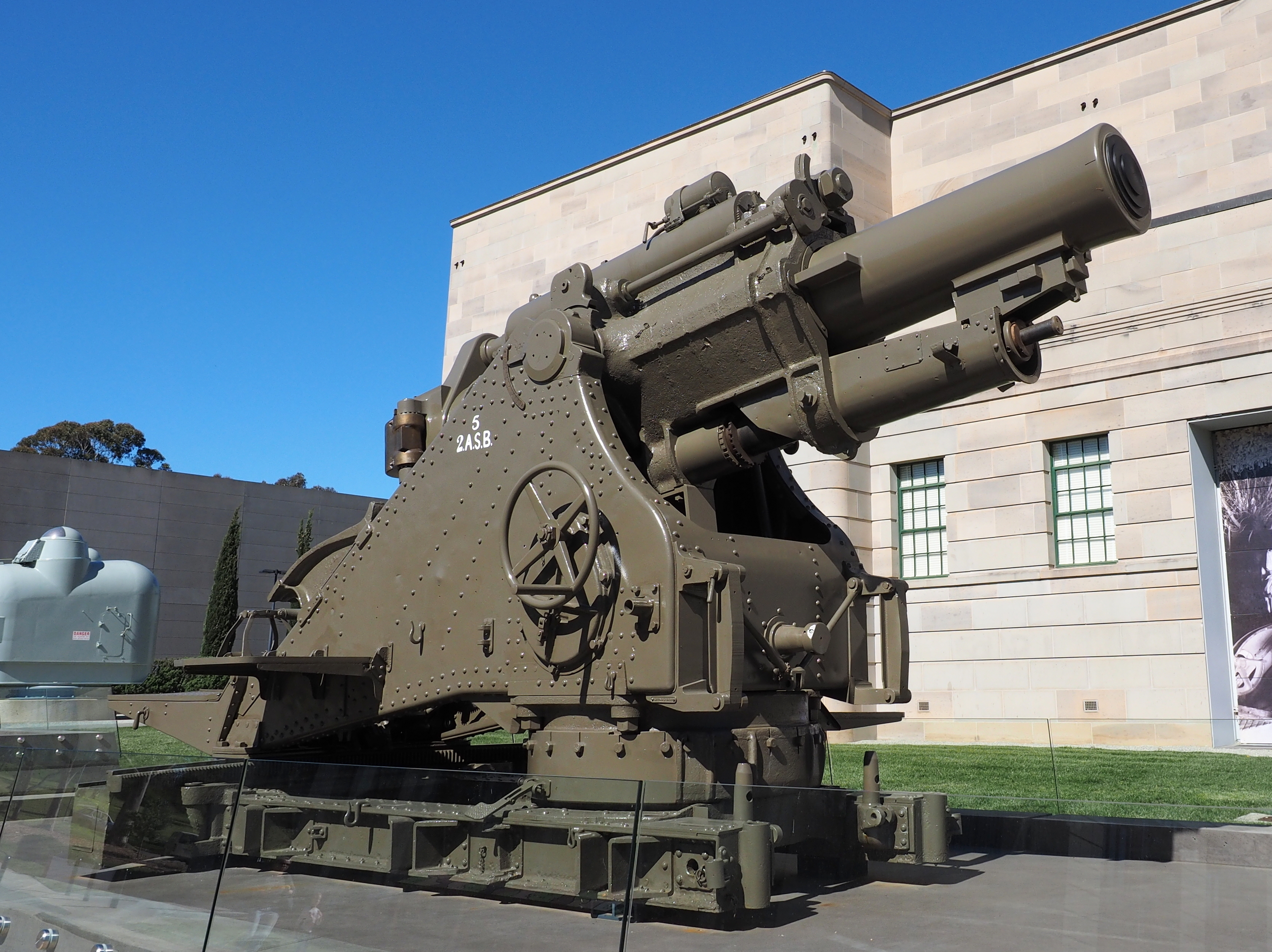
A BL 9.2-inch howitzer on display outside the Australian War Memorial in 2016

A Mk I howitzer, probably used by 55th Siege Battery of the First Australian Imperial Force in 1917, is preserved at the Australian War Memorial (AWM) in Canberra. The weapon was received by the AWM in 1939, later being used at an artillery range at Port Wakefield, South Australia for proof testing before returning to the AWM's stores in April 1949. It was later loaned to the Royal Australian Artillery for display at Holsworthy Barracks, returning to the AWM in 1998.

=== Charleston, South Carolina ===
A 9.2-inch howitzer barrel, manufactured in 1918 by the Bethlehem Steel Company, is displayed in White Point Garden at The Battery in Charleston, South Carolina (32.76983, -79.93179).

== See also ==
- List of siege artillery
- List of numbered documents of the US Department of War
- US War Department Ordnance Forms
