= List of United States War Department Forms =

Forms of the United States War Department, Office of the Chief of Ordnance, are handbooks, descriptions, instructions, that would later be called technical manuals (TM's): a technical description of a cannon, machine-gun, rifle, pistol, revolver, some wagons and trucks belonging to the artillery and ammunition, also some field manuals (FM's). The forms have their own numbers, at least through no. 2050.

== List ==
Document #	Name	Year of publication	Number of pages	Type of publication
400	Special specifications for steel wire to be used in connection with Ordnance pamphlet no. 445	1914	16	specifications/wire
1467				
1623	Instructions to accountants attached to Cost Accounting Section, Finance Division, Office of the Chief of Ordnance, War Department			
1656				
1657				
1659	Handbook of the 3-inch gun matériel, model of 1902 : with instructions for its care ... revised June 5, 1917	1917	284	TM/Artillery
1660	Handbook of the 3.2-inch field battery, with instructions for its care, July 30, 1902, revised June 23, 1908	1917	69	TM
1661	Handbook of the 5-inch siege gun battery with instructions for its care ... August 12, 1903. Revised May 10, 1911. Rev. June 9, 1914	1917	95	TM
1662	Handbook of the 7-inch siege howitzer battery with instructions for its care ... August 15, 1900. Revised August 12, 1903. Rev. June 23, 1908	1914	98	TM
1663	Description of the Pratt range board, model of 1905 : mechanical features and rules governing its care and preservation in service, May 20, 1908	1917	29	TM/Artillery
1665	Description of 8, 10, 12, 14 and 16 Inch Seacoast Guns and Their Breech Mechanisms	1917	59	TM/Coastal artillery
1666	Description of the Deflection Board, Model of 1905, for Guns: Mechanical ...	1917	20	TM/Artillery
1668	Description of the deflection board (model of 1906) with De Carre drift chart for 12-inch mortar : mechanical features, rules governing its care, operation and preservation in service, April 4, 1907, revised December 13, 1907	1917	26	TM/Artillery
1669	Description of the Whistler-Hearn plotting board (model of 1904), mortar plotting board (model of 1906 and model of 1906 MI), and submarine plotting board (model of 1906) : and instructions for assembling, adjusting, caring for, etc.	1909	26	TM/Artillery
1670	Description of the fire commander's plotting board, model of 1906, and instructions for assemblage, adjustment, care, and preservation, February 14, 1908	1917	30	TM/Artillery
1672	Description and instructions for use of the 360° mortar plotting board, model of 1911 ... October 9, 1912	1917	17	TM/Artillery
1673	Description of the 110° plotting board, model of 1915 ...	1917	11	TM/Artillery
1675	Description of the mortar range board, model of 1914, with instructions for care and operation	1916		TM/Mortar
1678	Safety features of firing and breech mechanisms of field, siege, and seacoast cannon, May 28, 1915	1917	40	FM/Artillery
1683	Instructions for mounting, using and caring for 5-inch barbette carriages, model of 1896, balanced pillar mounting	1917	19	TM/Artillery
1684	Instructions for mounting, using and caring for 5-inch barbette carriage, model of 1903 ... October 19, 1905. Revised May 25, 1908. Revised June 7, 1911	1917	24	TM/Artillery
1685	Instructions for mounting, using, and caring for 8-inch barbette carriages, model of 1892, for 8-inch rifle, model of 1888 ...			TM/Artillery
1686	Instructions for mounting, using, and caring for disappearing carriage, L. F., model of 1898, for 6-inch gun, model of 1897 MI ..	1917	58	TM/Artillery
1688	Instructions for mounting, using, and caring for 6-inch barbette carriage, model of 1900, October 10, 1904, revised December 3, 1907	1917	25	TM/Artillery
1689	Instructions for mounting, using, and caring for 8-inch disappearing carriages, L. F., model of 1894, for 8-inch gun, models of 1888 MI and MII ..	1916	40	TM/Artillery
1690	Instructions for mounting, using, and caring for 8-inch disappearing carriages, L. F., model of 1896, for 8-inch gun, models of 1888 MI and MII ..	1917	50	TM/Artillery
1691	Instructions for Mounting, Using and Caring for Disappearing Carriage L.F., model of 1894 M 1 for 10-inch guns, models of 1888 MI and MII	1917	74	TM/Artillery
1693	Instructions for Mounting, Using and Caring for Disappearing Carriage A.R.F. for 10-inch rifles...	1917	63	TM/Artillery
1694	Instructions for Mounting, Using and Caring for Disappearing Carriage L.F., model of 1901 for 10-inch guns, models of 1895 and 1900	1917	83	TM/Artillery
1695	Instructions for mounting, using and caring for disappearing carriage L.F., model of 1896 for 12-inch guns, models of 1888 and 1895, April 19, 1904	1917	64	TM
1696	Instructions for mounting, using and caring for disappearing carriage L.F., model of 1897 for 12-inch gun, model of 1895, revised May 31, 1904	1917	66	TM
1697	Instructions for mounting, using and caring for disappearing carriage L.F., model of 1901 for 12-inch guns, models of 1895 and 1900, revised May 31, 1904, revised March 23, 1908	1917	87	TM
1698				
1700	Instructions for Mounting, Using and Caring for barbette carriage, Model of 1893, for 10-inch guns, Model of 1888	1916	40	TM/Artillery
1701	Instructions for mounting, using and caring for 3-inch 15-pdr barbette carriage, model of 1903	1917	35	TM/Artillery
1702	Instructions for mounting, using and caring for barbette carriage, model of 1892, for 12-inch rifles, models of 1888, 1888 MI and 1888 MII, February 5, 1908	1917	25	TM
1703	Instructions for mounting, using and caring for disappearing carriage L.F., model of 1905 and 6-inch R. F. guns, model of 1905	1917	68	FM/Artillery
1704	Instructions for mounting, using and caring for disappearing carriage L.F., model of 1905 MI and 6-inch R. F. guns, models of 1903, 1905, and 1908	1917	55	FM/Artillery
1705	Instructions for mounting, using and caring for mortar carriages, model of 1896 MI and model of 1896 MII for 12-inch mortars, model of 1890 MI, April 22, 1909 ... rev. January 11, 1916	1917	41	TM
1709				
1711	Instructions for mounting, using and caring for disappearing carriage L.F., model of 1905 MII and 6-inch guns, models of 1905 and 1908	1917	71	FM/Artillery
1712	Instructions for mounting, using and caring for disappearing carriages L.F., models of 1907 and 1907 MI for 14-inch guns, models of 1907 and 1907 MI and model of 1910	1913	56	FM/Artillery
1713	Instructions for mounting, using and caring for 6-inch Barbette carriage, model of 1910, for 6-inch guns, model of 1908 MII	1917	35	TM
1715				
1716				
1717				
1722	Instructions for mounting, using and caring for Barbette carriage, model of 1917 for 12-inch gun, model of 1895 MI	1917	22	TM
1741	Description and instructions for the use of rifle and hand grenades	1912	15	FM
1741a	Description and instructions for the use of Hand Grenades	1917		FM
1750	Instructions for mounting, using, and caring for 4.72-inch gun, Armstrong, 45 caliber, mounted on barbette carriage, Armstrong ...	1917	42	TM/Artillery
1752	Instructions for mounting, using, and caring for 6-inch rapid-fire gun, Armstrong, and 6-inch barbette carriage, Armstrong ... May 21, 1903 ...	1917	22	TM/Artillery
1755	Gun making in the United States, by Captain ... Rogers Birnie, Jr. ...	1907	144	
1758	Handbook of the Colt automatic machine gun, caliber .30 : with pack outfits and accessories ... Aug. 17, 1901	1916	53	TM
1759	Handbook of the Colt machine gun, model of 1917, caliber.30	1917	17	TM
1761	Handbook of the 2.95-inch mountain gun matériel and pack outfit ... June 10, 1912	1916	108	TM
1766	Instructions for mounting, using, and caring for 3-inch (15-pounder) gun and barbette carriage, model of 1902	1917	35	TM
1768	Instructions for mounting, using, and caring for 3-inch saluting gun and mount	1918	15	TM
1770	Handbook of the Maxim automatic machine gun, caliber .30, model of 1904, with pack outfits and accessories, June 15, 1906, revised January 7, 1908 ... revised August 21, 1915	1917	74	TM
1771	Handbook of the 4.7-inch gun matériel, model of 1906 : with instructions for its care, November 19, 1910	1917	153	TM
1773	Handbook of the 3.8-inch gun matériel ... January 19, 1917	1917	53	TM
1775	Handbook of the Vickers machine gun, model of 1915, with pack outfits and accessories ... March 19, 1917	1917	69	TM
1779	Handbook of the 6-inch Howitzer matériel: Model of 1908 and 1908 MI with ...	1917	225	TM/Artillery
1781	Handbook of the 3.8-inch howitzer matériel, model of 1915 : with instructions for its care	1916	155	TM
1794	Description of the wind component indicator. Mechanical features, method of assembling and dismounting, and rules governing its care and preservation in service ... July 15, 1906	1917	24	TM/Artillery
1795	Instructions for the care, preservation, repair and adjustment of instruments for the fire-control systems for Coast Artillery fire control system coast and field artillery	1917	79	FM/Coastal artillery
1796	Handbook of fire-control equipment for field artillery	1916	101	FM
1797	Handbook of range-finders, 70 cm. and 80 cm. base, for use of infantry and cavalry : with description and instructions for their care and use, December 9, 1915	1917	67	TM/Artillery
1798	Handbook of the 8-inch howitzer matériel, model of 1917... with instructions for its care ... January 15, 1918	1918	75	TM
1803				
1814	Description and instructions for care and operation of firing magnetos, types GA and MA	1917	26	TM/Firing magnetos
1815	Handbook of the 75-mm gun matériel, model of 1917 (British) with instructions for its care. (Thirty-two plates) February 9, 1918. Rev. September 6, 1918	1918	106	TM
1817				
1819	Handbook of the 75-mm gun matériel, model of 1916 : with instructions for its care	1918	140	TM
1820	Description of twelve-inch mortars and instructions for their care ... Nov. 4, 1904. Rev. Dec. 11, 1907. Rev. Oct. 3, 1913	1917	27	TM/Mortar
1861	Handbook on Ordnance data	1919	523	FM/artillery
1869	Oils, Paints and Materials for the Cleaning and Preservation of Seacoast ...	1917	31	FM/Artillery
1870				
1876	Description of Lewis Depression Position Finders, Model of 1907, Classes AA ...	1917	34	TM/Position Finders
1879				
1905				
1907				
1908	Instructions for mounting, using, and caring for 6-inch rapid-fire gun, Armstrong, and 6-inch barbette carriage, Armstrong, May 21, 1903	1917	22	TM
1912	Ordnance property regulations, 1917	1917	135	FM
1917	Description and rules for the management of the United States rifle, caliber .30, model of 1917, October 8, 1917	62		TM
1919	Description of the Colt's double-action revolver, caliber .38, with rules for management, memoranda of trajectory, and description of ammunition ... April 1, 1905. Rev. Oct. 3, 1908	1917	15	TM
1920	Description and rules for the management of the U. S. magazine rifle model of 1898 and magazine carbine model of 1899, caliber .30	1917	74	TM
1923	Description and rules for the management of the United States rifle, caliber .30, model of 1903 ... March 3, 1904. Rev. Apr. 18, 1906, Feb. 14, 1908, Apr. 2, 1909, Oct. 17, 1911, March 20, 1914, Jan. 22, 1917	1917	80	TM
1925	Description and instructions for the management of the gallery-practice rifle, caliber .22—model of 1903 : October 18, 1907, revised December 14, 1908, revised October 17, 1913	1913	12	TM
1926	Handbook of the Benet-Mercié machine rifle, model of 1909, with pack outfits and accessories. Thirty-one plates. March, 1912 ... rev. September 6, 1917	1917	83	TM
1927	Description of the Colt's double-action revolver, caliber .45, model of 1909 : with rules for management, memoranda of trajectory, and description of ammunition, September 10, 1909	1913	13	TM
1952	Handbook of sights for field and seacoast carriages, not covered by other pamphlets	1913/1917	35	FM/Artillery
1955	Description of 3-inch telescopic sights, model of 1904, June 15, 1905, revised July 15, 1906, revised December 5, 1907	1912	16	TM/Telescopic sights,
1956	Description of 2-inch telescopic sights, model of 1906 ... October 11, 1907. Revised October 11, 1910. Revised December 16, 1913. Revised March 1, 1917	1917	17	TM/Telescopic sights
1957	Description of telescopic musket sights, models of 1908 and 1913 ... December 14, 1908. Revised July 22, 1912	1915	10	TM/Telescopic sights
1958	Description of 2 inch telescopic sights, model of 1909 ...	1917	58	TM/Telescopic sights
1959	Description of 3-inch telescopic sights, model of 1912	1914	12	TM/Telescopic sights
1960	Description of 3-inch telescopic sights, model of 1910	1915	11	TM/Telescopic sights
1962	Handbook of the artillery repair truck body, model 1918	1918	159	TM
1965				
1986	Directions for using, mounting, and dismounting 1-pdr and 2.95-inch subcaliber guns in the bore of seacoast guns and mortars ...	1917	39	FM
1990	Description of Decapping and Cleaning Tools for Small-arms Cartridges ...	1916	13	FM/Artillery
1991	Coast Artillery targets and accessories	1917	11	FM
1994	Mobile artillery targets, accessories, and smoke-bomb outfits	1917	23	FM Artillery
1995	Handbook of the six-ton special tractor, model 1917	1918	12	TM
1996	Handbook of the 5-ton artillery tractor, model 1917 : with instructions for its care, operations and maintenance	1918	260	TM
1998	Target range pocket book for use with the U.S. magazine rifle, model of 1903, cal. .30 ... April 28, 1908	1917	13	TM
1999	Handbook of the two-ton truck chassis : Nash model 4017-A and 4017-L July 3, 1918	1918	261	TM
2003	Handbook of the ten-ton artillery tractor, model 1917	1918	278	TM
2017	Service Handbook of the 155-mm Howitzer Matériel, Model of 1918 (Schneider): Motorized ...	192	236	TM/Artillery
2018	Handbook of the 3-inch Antiaircraft Gun Materiel Model of 1918 Motorized with instructions for its care (10 May 1919)	1919	203	TM/Artillery
2028	Handbook of 12-inch howitzer railway mount, model of 1918	1919	115	TM
2030	Army ordnance. History of district offices, [1918-19]	1920	-	general
2033	Handbook of artillery : including mobile, antiaircraft, trench and automotive matériel / Prepared in the Office of the chief of ordnance, July, 1921	1925	398	FM
2034 Vol.1	Railway Artillery: A Report on the Characteristics, Scope of Utility, Etc., of Railway Artillery ...	1921	861	FM
2034 Vol.2	Railway artillery; a report on the characteristics, scope of utility, etc., of railway artillery, in two vols. .	1922	224	FM
2035	Theory and design of recoil systems and gun carriages. Prepared in the Office of the chief of ordnance. September, 1921	1921	1011	FM
2035-A	Theory and design of recoil systems and gun carriages (chapter VIII) / Prepared in the office of the Chief of Ordnance	1922	85	FM
2049	Handbook of the St. Chamond recoil mechanism for 75 mm gun carriage, model of 1916MI ...	1924	43	TM/Artillery
2050	Notes on the selection and use of metals in ordnance design	1924	57	FM

== See also ==
- United States Army Ordnance Corps
- List of numbered documents of the United States Department of War
