= 3-inch M1902 field gun =

3-inch Gun, Model of 1902, 1904, and 1905
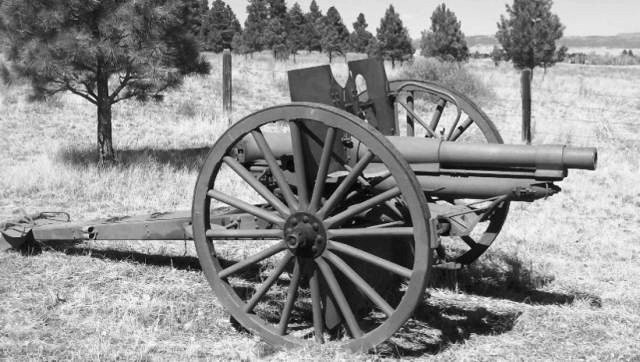
- M1905 model
- Type: Light field gun
- Place of origin: United States

Service history
- In service: 1902–1919
- Used by: US Army
- Wars: World War I

Production history
- Designer: Watervliet Arsenal
- Designed: 1902
- Produced: 1902–1917
- No. built: M1902: 182; M1904: 40; M1905: 441
- Variants: M1902, M1904, M1905

Specifications
- Mass: gun & breech : 835 lb (379 kg) (1902 & 1904); 788 lb (357 kg) (1905); 2,520 lb (1,140 kg) gun & carriage total.
- Length: 180 in (460 cm) From trail to muzzle
- Barrel length: 28 calibers, 7 feet (2.1 m) (bore)
- Width: 76 in (190 cm)
- Height: 63 in (160 cm)
- Crew: 5
- Shell: Fixed QF 76.2 x 273mm R
- Shell weight: 15 lb (6.8 kg)
- Calibre: 3-inch (76.2 mm)
- Breech: Interrupted screw, De Bange type
- Recoil: hydro-spring, 45 inches (1.14 m)
- Carriage: wheeled
- Elevation: -5° to +15°
- Rate of fire: 15 rounds per minute
- Muzzle velocity: 1,700 ft/s (520 m/s)
- Effective firing range: 6,000 yd (5,500 m) at 15° elevation
- Maximum firing range: 8,500 yd (7,800 m) approx.
- Feed system: hand

The 3-inch Gun, Model of 1902 was the U.S. Army’s first nickel steel, quick-firing field gun with a recoil mechanism. Like its predecessor, the 3.2-inch gun M1897, it was a rifled breechloader.

== Design ==
During the second half of 1890s, the so-called "quick-firing revolution" was underway, and many countries from Russia and Germany to the Transvaal Republic started to adopt guns with some recoil systems, but the Army adopted the outdated 3.2-inch gun M1897 instead. Quickly realizing the mistake, the Ordnance Department, alongside producing the M1897, started development of what was termed an "accelerated-fire gun." Captain Charles B. Wheeler designed a 3-inch gun that allowed more shots to be made faster, but the gun was still required to be relaid after each shot. However, by 1900, when its procurement was underway, the first concrete information about the revolutionary French Canon de 75 modèle 1897 was declassified. New, truly quick-firing designs with a long recoil by private manufacturers emerged in Europe, and Commanding General of the United States Army Nelson A. Miles lobbied Secretary of War Elihu Root to block the process. In 1901, the long-recoil design was tested and deemed superior, and in 1902 the Ordnance Department combined elements of Wheeler's piece and an Ehrhardt piece (probably similar to the Norwegian M1901) into one design.

The features of rifling, breech loading with fixed ammunition, and a hydraulic-spring system to absorb the gun's recoil and quickly return it to the firing position combined to improve the range, accuracy, and rate of fire of the gun compared with previous weapons, allowing it to be used more effectively in operations with infantry. These new capabilities allowed the gun to provide accurate indirect fire on targets not in a direct line of sight, which provided crucial firepower for infantry attacks. It was also one of the first US artillery guns with an armored shield to protect the crew from small arms fire. The gun fired 3 inches (76 mm) steel, shrapnel, or explosive shells that weighed 15 pounds (6.8 kg). The use of nickel steel construction meant that the M1902 could fire a heavier shell at a higher muzzle velocity and greater accuracy (due to tighter rifling) than any other field gun of American origin to that point. It had a muzzle velocity of 1,700 ft/s (520 m/s) with an effective range of 6,500 yards (5,900 m), and a maximum range of 8,500 yards (7,800 m). The maximum rate of fire was 15 rounds per minute.

== Service history ==
This weapon replaced the 3.2-inch gun M1897 in most combat units, but both weapons remained in service until after World War I. General John J. Pershing brought several of the guns with him during the "Punitive Expedition" against Mexican forces in 1916–17, but they were not fired in combat.

The M1902 was in service from 1902 through 1919. During World War I, the Army primarily used the French 75 mm 1897 gun instead of the M1902s, which were mostly kept in the United States for training. Although this weapon appears in World War I-era tables of organization and equipment, very few of the M1902s were used in combat in Europe. They were gradually phased out of active service in the 1920s.

== Variants ==
A cutaway from a 3.8-inch gun manual, showing the internal design very similar to the 3-inch gun

3-inch Gun, Model of 1904

New breech mechanism.

3-inch Gun, Model of 1905

Similar to the Model of 1904, except made about 50 lb (23 kg) lighter by reduction of the outside diameters of the gun and modification of the clip hoop that secures the barrel to the guide rails on the cradle near the muzzle. Different rifling twist.

3.8-inch Gun, Models of 1904 and 1907

Similar to the 3-inch gun, but scaled up with a significantly longer barrel - 111.25 inches (2.826 m) overall gun body length instead of 87.8 inches (2.23 m) - in a larger caliber, with a lengthened recoil - 58.5 inches (1.49 m) instead of 45 inches (1.1 m) - as well as with a different extractor. Weighed 3,875 pounds (1,758 kg) and fired a 30 pounds (14 kg) shell up to 8,000 yards (7,300 m).

== Surviving examples ==
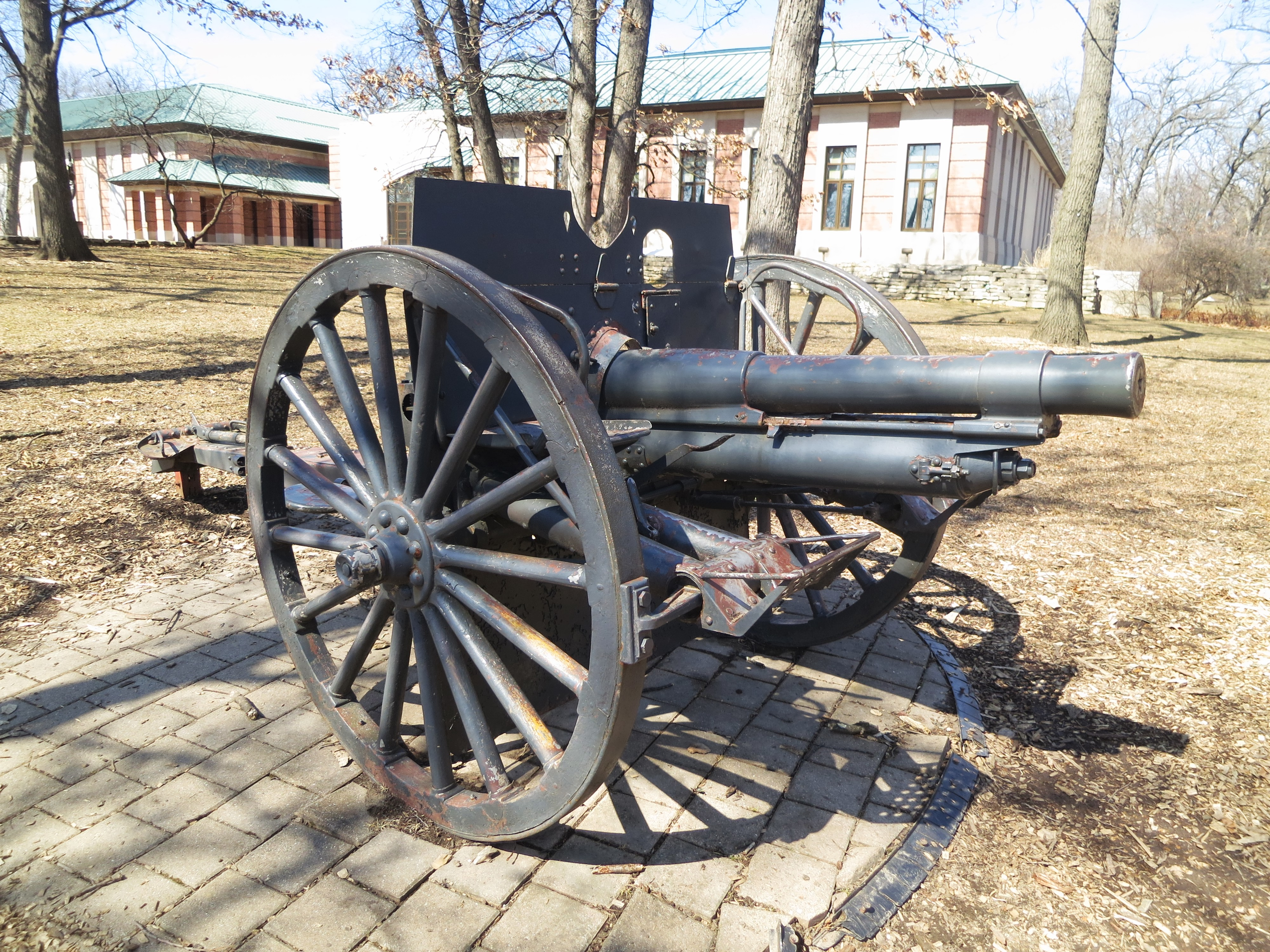
M1902 field gun at the First Division Museum tank park at Cantigny Park.

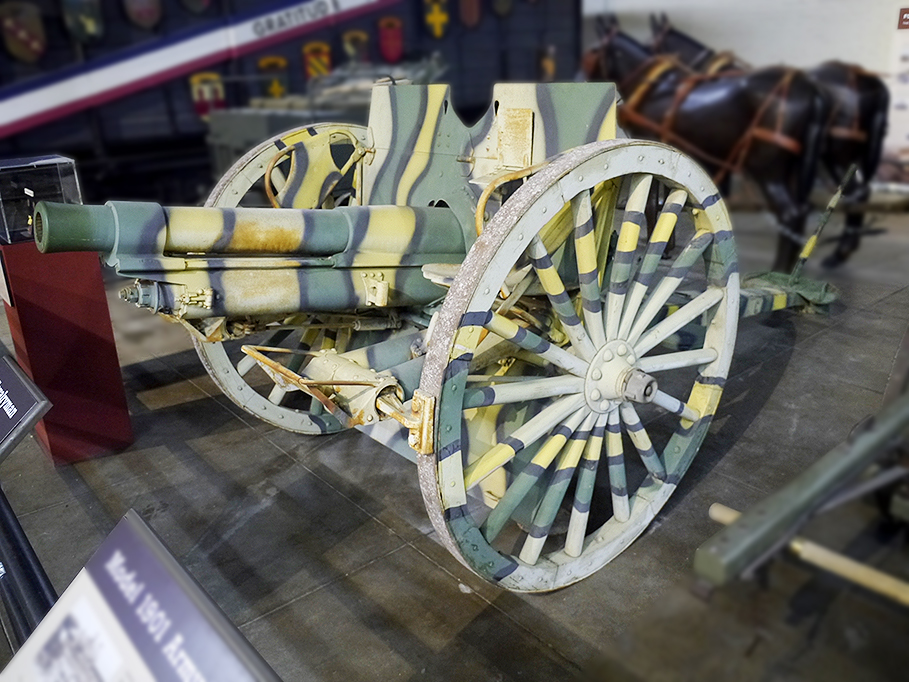
A 3-inch M1902 field gun exhibited at the Texas Military Forces Museum, Austin, Texas.

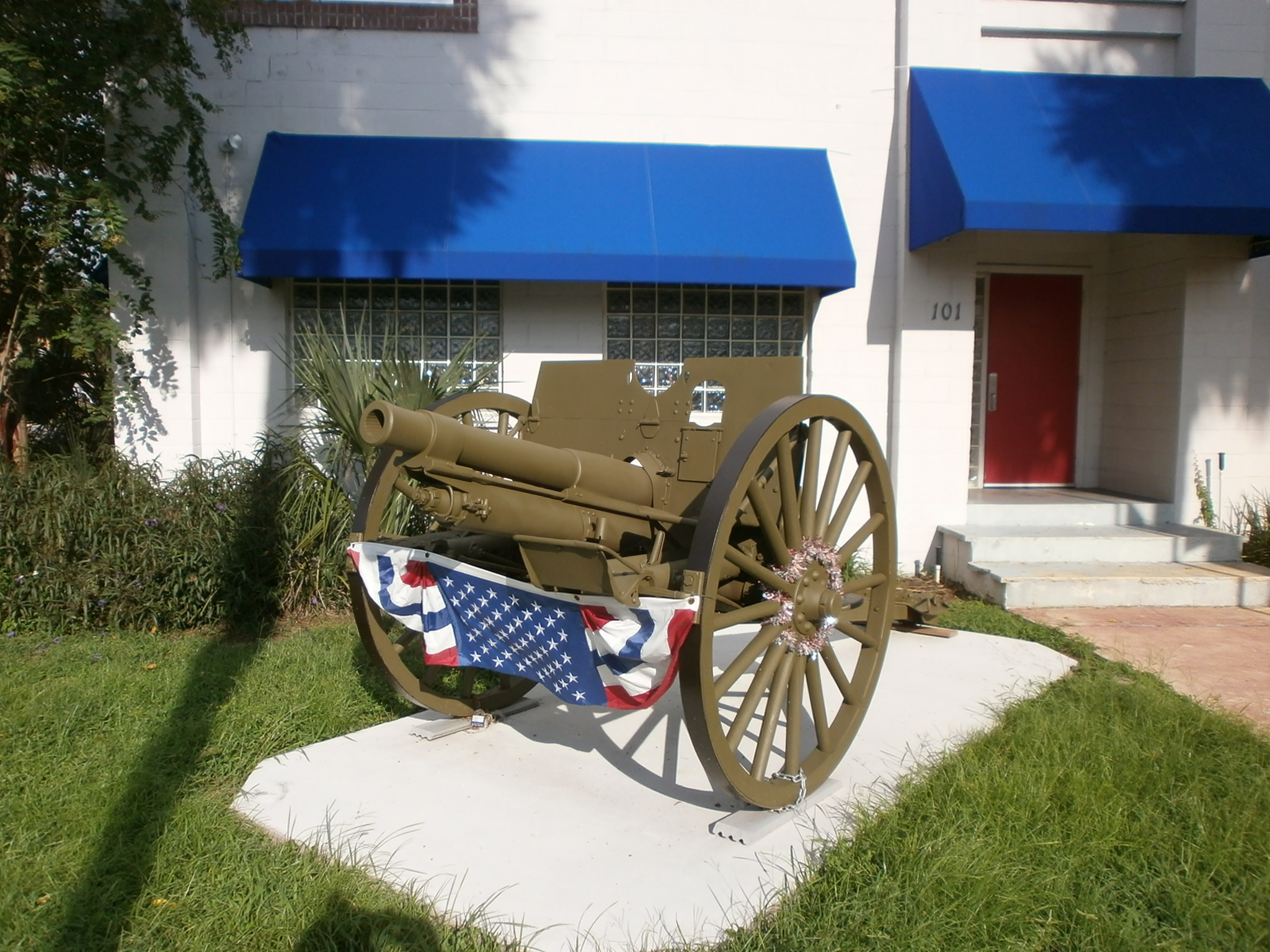
A 3-inch M1902 field gun exhibited at the American Legion Hall Post 41, Eustis, Florida.

- One M1902 and one M1904 at the veterans memorial park in Mesquite, Nevada. M1902 is missing its breechblock.
- One M1904, used by Southern Utah University Army ROTC, Cedar City, Utah. It is still in working order, and fires blank rounds during football games.
- Cantigny Park, in Wheaton, Illinois.
- Westminster, Massachusetts
- One on the courthouse grounds, New London, Missouri.
- U.S. Army Ordnance Training and Heritage Center, Fort Gregg-Adams, Virginia.
- Fort Sam Houston, Texas
- One at 45th Division Museum, Oklahoma City, Oklahoma
- One at Clemson University.
- One at the Fort Sill museum.
- One M1902, number 56, manufactured in 1905, by the Rock Island Arsenal in front of the American Legion hall, Eustis, Florida.
- Two at Texas A&M University. Operated by the Corps of Cadets, Parsons' Mounted Cavalry Half Section (the most famous is named The Spirit of '02).
- One M1902 at the Texas Military Forces Museum, Austin, Texas.
- One at Minnesota State Academy for the Deaf, Faribault, Minnesota.

American 1902 3 inch gun at the Michigan Military Heritage Museum in Jackson Michigan, a view from the left front

*One M1902 at the Michigan Military Heritage Museum, Jackson, Michigan.

- Three at Valley Forge Military Academy in Wayne, Pennsylvania.
- One at Veterans of Foreign Wars Post no. 33, Greensburg, Pennsylvania.
- One M1902 in Mission County Park, San Antonio, Texas. The gun is missing its wheels.
- One M1902 at War Memorial Training Center, Stuttgart, Arkansas. Newly refurbished.
- One in Columbus, New Mexico.
- One in Presidio of Monterey, California.
- One in Annandale, Virginia.
- One at 2 S. Main St. in Lexington, Virginia.
- One at Liberty Park in Hudson, Massachusetts.
- One in New Bedford, Massachusetts.
- One M1905 in Cullman, Alabama on route 278 and High Way 65. It is missing the breech block and the wheels are in need of repair.
- One at Camp Edwards, Massachusetts.
- One at the Newport Artillery Company Armory, Newport, Rhode Island.
- One at High Street Cemetery, Danvers, Massachusetts.
- Two at Lakeview Park in the City of Lorain near Cleveland, Ohio.
- One M1902 on display in the city of Hopewell, Virginia.
- One M1904 is in the possession of 3-7 Field Artillery at Schofield Barracks, Hawaii.
- One M1902 is on display at the U.S. Army Museum of Hawaii at Fort DeRussy in Honolulu, Hawaii.
- One in Costa Mesa, California.
- One M1905 on the grounds of the Rush County Courthouse, Rushville, Indiana.
- Two at the Washington National Guard Museum, Camp Murray, Washington.
- One M1905 on the grounds of VFW Post 5700 in Hightstown, New Jersey.
- One M1902 on the parade grounds of Fort Meade, South Dakota.
- One M1902 at the Illinois State Military Museum in Springfield, Illinois.
- One M1902 at the West End World War I Memorial Park in Amsterdam, New York - serial number 155.
- One at the American Legion post, Patchogue, New York.
- Two M1902 guns sit outside Christian Brothers Academy in Albany, New York.
- One M1905 at the VFW Post 3911. Key West, Florida.
- One M1905, missing the wheels, is located in Brighton, Illinois.
- Two M1905 at Fort Niagara State Park, New York.
- One M1905 at the Nebraska National Guard Museum, Seward, Nebraska.
- One, model not identifiable, at the side of the American Legion post in Ottawa, Illinois.
- One M1905 at the Greenbrier Military School (GMS) Museum on the campus of the West Virginia School of Osteopathic Medicine in Lewisburg, West Virginia.
- One M1092 at the Lewis Army Museum, Joint Base Lewis-McChord Washington.
- Two at American Legion Post 20 in Plattsburgh, New York.

== See also ==
- List of U.S. Army weapons by supply catalog designation SNL C-24
- List of field guns

=== Weapons of comparable role, performance and era ===
- 76 mm divisional gun M1902 Russian equivalent
- 7.7 cm FK 96 n.A. German equivalent
- Ordnance BLC 15 pounder and Ordnance QF 15 pounder British equivalent
