= 65th Air Defense Artillery Regiment =

65th Air Defense Artillery
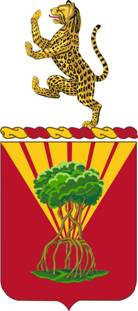
- Coat of arms
- Active: 1917
- Country: United States
- Branch: Army
- Type: Air Defense Artillery
- Size: Regiment
- Motto(s): "Sursum" (Upwards)
- Colors: Scarlet
- Mascot(s): Oozlefinch
- Decorations: Presidential Unit Citation; Valorous Unit Award with Oak Leaf Cluster; Meritorious Unit Commendation

Commanders
- Notable commanders: Colonel Carl E. Hocker

The 65th Air Defense Artillery was a training regiment in the United States Army. During World War I the unit was a tractor drawn (TD) unit equipped with British BL 9.2 inch Howitzers. When it was reactivated in Panama in 1924 it became an (AA) anti aircraft unit equipped with the 3-inch Gun M1918.

== Lineage ==
Constituted 26 December 1917 in the Regular Army as the 1st Battalion 65th Artillery (Coast Artillery Corps) and organized 1 January 1918 at Fort Rosecrans, California. Demobilized 28 February 1919 at Camp Lewis, Washington. reconstituted 1 July 1924 in the regular army as 1st Battalion, 65th Coast Artillery (Antiaircraft) and activated at Fort Amador, Canal Zone; Inactivated 15 April 1932 at Fort Amador. Activated 1 June 1938 at Fort Winfield Scott, California. reorganized at Fort Ord, California and redesignated 10 May 1943 as the 65th Antiaircraft Artillery Gun Battalion (Semimobile). (Departed San Francisco Port of embarkation 12 July 1943 for overseas service and arrived in Alaska 22 July 1943. Returned from overseas service and arrived at the Seattle Port of embarkation on 16 December 1944). Inactivated (less Batteries B, C, and D,) 26 January 1945 at Camp Hood, Texas; Concurrently, Batteries B, C, and D, redesignated 427th, 428th, and 429th Antiaircraft Artillery Gun Batteries, respectively). Activated (with new Batteries B, C, and D,) 1 May 1949 on Okinawa. Redesignated 23 February 1955 as the 65th Antiaircraft Artillery Battalion. Inactivated 1 September 1959 in Japan. Consolidated 31 July 1959 with the 65th Artillery, a parent regiment under the Combat Arms Regimental System.

The regiment's insignia was redesignated effective 1 September 1971, for the 65th Air Defense Artillery Regiment.

== Campaign streamers ==
World War I

- St. Mihiel
- Meuse-Argonne
- Lorraine

World War II

- Aleutian Islands

== Decorations ==
- Presidential Unit Citation
- Valorous Unit Award with second award
- Meritorious Unit Commendation
