= 3.2-inch gun M1897 =

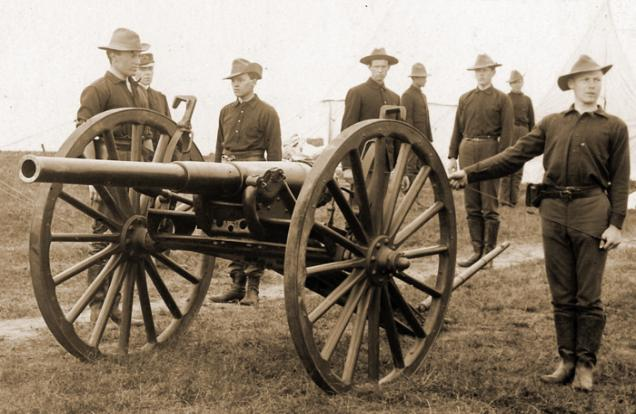
- Model 1885 with crew, Spanish–American War era. Note the three-stage barrel rather than the two-stage barrel used on the Model 1897.
- Type: Light field gun
- Place of origin: United States

Service history
- In service: 1885–1919
- Used by: US Army
- Wars: Spanish–American War; Philippine–American War; Boxer Rebellion

Production history
- Designer: Watervliet Arsenal
- Designed: 1885
- Manufacturer: Gun: Watertown Arsenal, West Point Foundry, Watervliet Arsenal; Carriage: Springfield Arsenal, Rock Island Arsenal
- Produced: 1885-1899
- No. built: 100 (M1885); 272 (M1890 and M1897); 372 total
- Variants: M1885, M1890, M1897

Specifications
- Mass: 830 lb (380 kg) gun & breech; 2,130 lb (970 kg) gun & carriage total
- Barrel length: 26 calibers, 83.2 inches (2.11 m) (bore)
- Shell: Separate-loading, bagged charges and projectiles.: Black powder (M1885 and original M1890); Smokeless powder (M1897 and converted M1890)
- Shell weight: 13 lb 8 oz (6 kg)
- Calibre: 3.2-inch (81 mm)
- Breech: de Bange style interrupted screw
- Recoil: Wheel brakes, no recoil mechanism
- Carriage: Box trail
- Elevation: +20° max
- Traverse: None
- Muzzle velocity: 1,685 ft/s (514 m/s)
- Maximum firing range: 6,530 yd (5,970 m)
- Feed system: Hand

The 3.2-inch gun M1897 (81 mm), with its predecessors the M1885 and M1890, was the U.S. Army's first steel, rifled, breech loading field gun. It was the Army's primary field artillery piece in the Spanish–American War, Philippine–American War, and Boxer Rebellion from 1898 to 1902.

== Design ==
This series of weapons was designed to provide a modern alternative to breech loading conversions of the Civil War-era 3-inch Ordnance rifle. It was constructed of steel and was of built-up construction with a central rifled tube, and reinforcing hoops from the trunnions to the breech. Its steel was stronger than the wrought iron of preceding weapons. The guns had an interrupted screw breech with either a de Bange plastic obturator or (on the earlier modifications) a conceptually similar design by Spaniard Luis Freyre y Góngora with a metallic ring, and fired separate-loading, bagged charges and projectiles. The projectiles weighed approximately 13.5 lb (6.1 kg) and common, shrapnel, or canister types available. The M1885 and M1890 used black powder when first introduced, but the M1897 was redesigned for smokeless powder; the M1890 weapons were then modified for smokeless powder and re-designated M1897s. In the Spanish–American War, difficulties were encountered in ramping up production of smokeless powder, so the M1885 and M1890 weapons were deployed to use the available black powder. The M1890 was a simplification of the M1885, with the barrel made from two forgings instead of eight. The guns had a box trail carriage built from bolted steel plates with two large wooden spoked wheels. The guns did not have a recoil mechanism or a gun shield but the carriage's wheel brakes provided some recoil absorption. Due to its low angle of elevation +20° it was a direct fire weapon. For transport, the gun was attached to a limber for towing by a horse team and there were seats attached to the axle of the carriage for the crew. The limber also had seats for crew members plus ammunition and supplies.

== Service history ==
This weapon was the workhorse light artillery piece of the Spanish–American War and the Philippine–American War from 1898 to 1902. At least 16 were deployed to Cuba in the former conflict. It was also used in the China Relief Expedition in 1900. Beginning in 1902 the 3.2-inch gun was largely replaced in combat units by the 3-inch M1902 field gun. However, 3.2-inch guns lingered in reserve and training roles. During World War I, the Army primarily used the French 75 mm gun instead of its own designs, which were mostly kept in the United States for training. The 3.2-inch guns were subsequently declared obsolete, and almost all were scrapped beginning in 1919.

== Surviving examples ==
At least 38 of these weapons survive, six in private hands.

- Two M1897 at Fort Stevens State Park, Hammond, Oregon
- One M1885 at Rock Island Arsenal, Illinois
- One M1897 in Abilene, Texas
- One M1885, Fairmount Cemetery, Denver, Colorado
- One M1885 at Memorial Triangle Park in Brookhaven, New York
- One M1897 in Burlington, Wisconsin
- One M1885 in Waterford, Wisconsin
- One M1897 in Veterans' Memorial Park, Hull, Massachusetts
- One M1890, Main Street, Flemington, New Jersey
- One M1897 in Montgomery, Illinois
- Three M1897 at San Juan Hill, Santiago de Cuba, Cuba
- One M1897 #225 with clean bore, Casper municipal cemetery, Casper, WY in Veterans section. Limber & ammunition carriages located at Fort Caspar entrance, Casper Wyoming.
- Two M1890s at Frank Marston American Legion Post 33, Pensacola, Florida

== See also ==
- List of U.S. Army weapons by supply catalog designation SNL C-24
- List of field guns

== Gallery ==
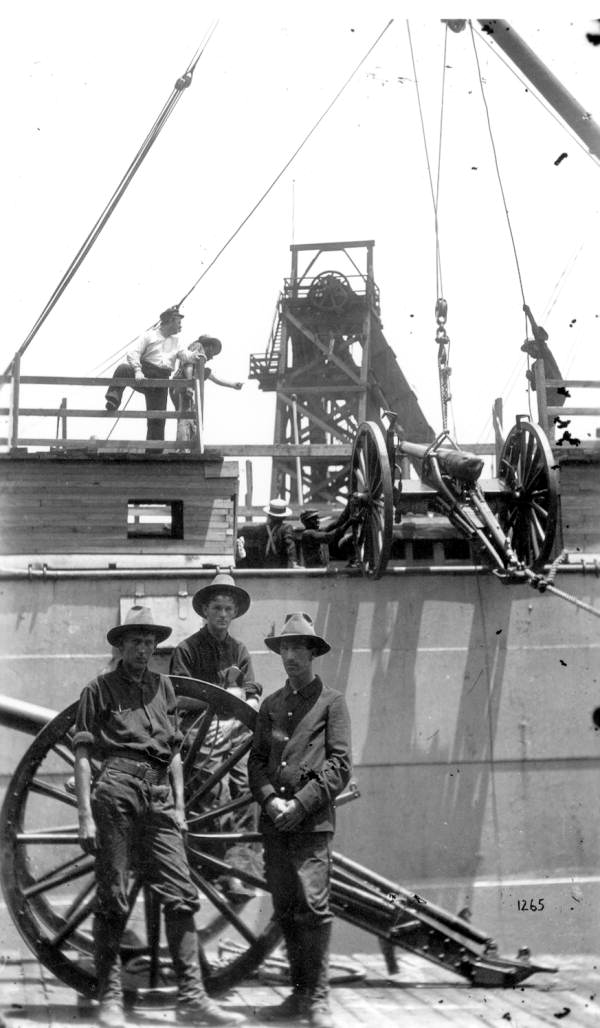
3.2-inch guns being loaded at Tampa FL during the Spanish–American War.

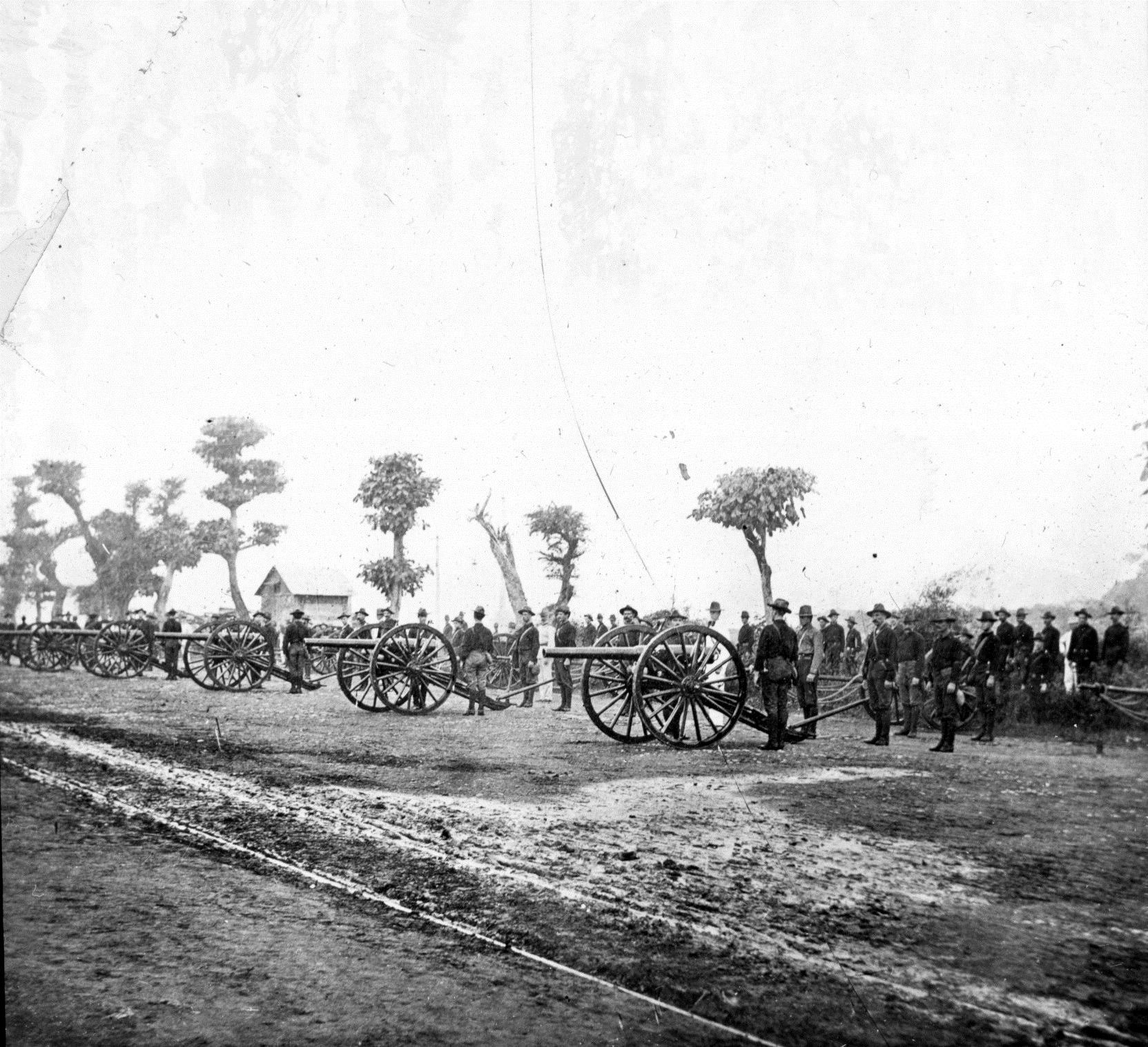
3.2-inch guns of the 6th US Artillery in the Spanish–American War.

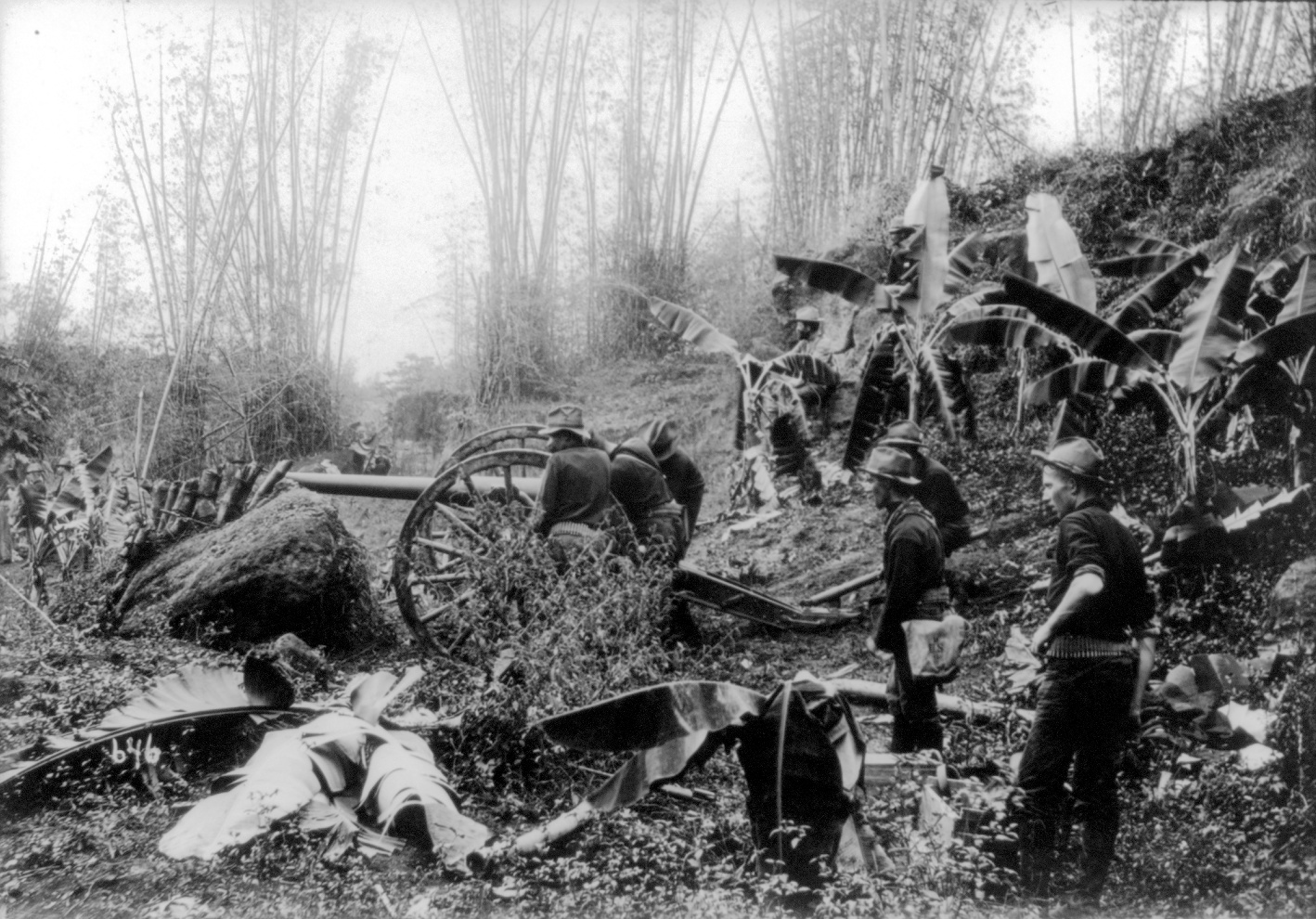
3.2-inch guns in the Philippines.
