= List of numbered documents of the United States Department of War =

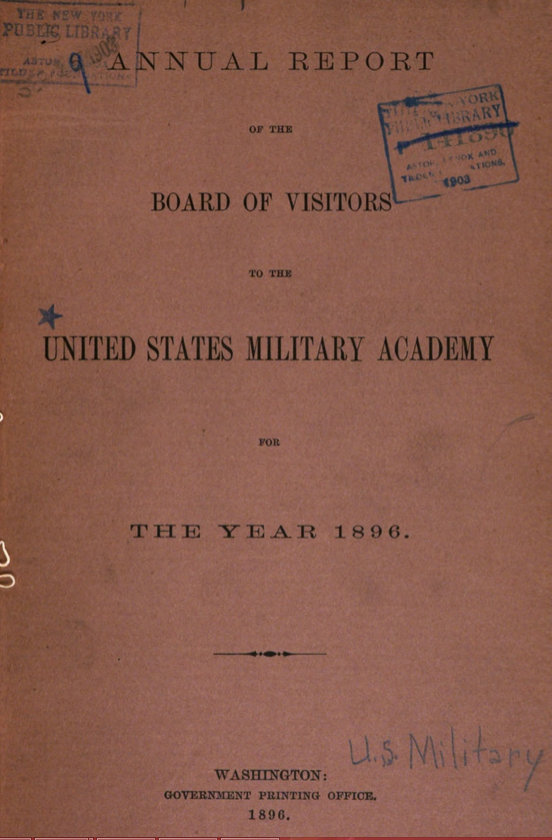
Document 28 of 1896

From 1896 to 1929, the United States Department of War gave their publications a successive number, like other departments including the Department of Agriculture and Department of the Treasury. They were mostly (drill) regulations and other field manuals (as they were later called, when the War Department adopted the FM Field Manual numbering), but also collections of military laws or descriptions of countries of military interest and campaigns or battles. Only a few Technical Manuals (TM's) (as they were later called) are included in this series. These publications were mainly printed by the Government Printing Office, but also by some other printers. Many of them can be found in the HathiTrust, Archive.org and CARC (Combined Arms Research Center) online libraries. Other known US War department publications are for example General Orders, Special Orders and Special Regulations. Many of the so-called Monographs, mainly descriptions of campaigns and battles, have their own numbering, but several of them also have a War Department Document (W.D. doc) number.

== List ==
Document #	Name	Year of publication	Number of pages	Field of interest
1	Resolutions of the conventions held at Munich, Dresden, Berlin and Vienna for the purpose of adopting uniform methods for testing construction materials with regard to their mechanical properties	1896	44	strength of construction materials
2	Index; Special Orders, Chief of Engineers	1896	..	Special Orders
3	Organized militia of 1895	1896	..	manual
4	Manufacture of Lyle Guns	1896	...	manual
5	Manual of photography	1896	12	photography
5A	The Chaplain. His place and Duties	1926	73	Chaplaincy
6	Notes on Organization, Armament and Military Progress (M.I.D.(Military Information Document) no.8)	1896	..	Survey of armies in the world
7	Bulletin no.5: Northern and Northwestern Lakes	1896	...	general
8	Firing Regulations	1896	..	...
9	Soldiers' Handbook	1896	..	general
10	The Military schools of Europe [microform] : and other papers selected for publication	1896	207	Schools
11	Tests of Construction Materials	1896	..	Construction
11a	Training manual, United States army. : The saddler	1926	-	FM
12	Drill Regulations. Hospital Corps	1896	124	sanitary
13	Sources of information on Military Professional Subjects	1896	121	..
14	Drill regulations for cavalry, United States Army	1896	528	regulations
14a	Manual for courts-martial, U.S. Army 1928	1928	360	manual/courts
15	Description of Colt's Revolver	1896	...	small arms
16	Notes on the War Between China and Japan; the European Autumn Maneuvers of 1896, Orders Instructions, Etc.	1896	-	campaigns
17	Manual for the Medical Department	1896	121	manual/medical
17a	The genesis of the American first army	1929	81	history
17	Manual for the Medical Department	1896	138	sanitary
18	Manual for army cooks	1896	306	cooking
19	Handbook for Subsistence Stores	1896	213	subsistence
20	Manual for the pay department. Published by authority of the secretary of war, for the use in the army of the United States	1896	64	paymaster
21	Manual for the Subsistence Department. Published by authority of the Secretary of War for use in the Army of the United States	1898	57	subsistence
22 (no.64 is printing error	Military Laws of the United States	1897	989	laws
23	Influence of the Command of a battery	1897	-	-
23a				
28	Annual report of the Board of Visitors of the United States Military Academy made to the Secretary of War for the year	1896	94	report
29	Manual for the Quartermaster's department, pub. by authority of the Secretary of War for use in the army of the United States	1897	32	manual/Quartermaster
38	Regulations and decisions pertaining to the uniform of the Army of the United States	1897	44	regulations
39	Finding list of military biographies and other personal literature in the War Department Library	1899	145	biographies
40	List of the photographs and photographic negatives relating to the war for the union, now in the War Department Library	1897	219	photographs
41	Military literature in the War Department Library relating to the participation of the individual states in the war for the union	1897	203	military literature
45	Infantry drill regulations, United States Army; adopted Oct. 3, 1891	1898	286 + index	TM
47	Infantry Drill Regulations, The Manual of Arms, Adapted to the magazine rifle caliber 30	1897	51	drill regulations
51				
63	Remarks on the army regulations and executive regulations in general	1898	189	regulations
64	The military laws of the United States	1898	852	laws
69	Manual of the Pay Department	1898	76	financial
70	Drill regulations for siege artillery, United States Army	1898	43	regulations, artillery
72	Firing Regulations for Small Arms	1898	..	Small Arms
77	Manual for courts-martial and of procedure under military law. Revised in the judge-advocate general's office, and published by authority of the secretary of war, for use in the army of the United States	1898	171	Manual
80	Military literature in the War Department Library relating to the campaign against Chattanooga, siege of Chattanooga, battle of Chickamauga, battle of Lookout Mountain, battle of Missionary Ridge, and the retreat of Bragg, comprising the period embraced from August, 1863, to December, 1863 ...	1898	75	library
82	Property and general regulations of the Signal corps, U.S. army	1898	38	regulations/signal corps
84	Military literature in the War department library relating chiefly to the participation of the individual states in the war for the union	1899	266	library
85	Military notes on Cuba	1898	507	countries
86	Staffs of Various Armies	1899	243	general
95	A French-English military technical dictionary; with a supplement containing recent military and technical terms, by Cornélis De Witt Willcox	1917	582	dictionary
104	Regulations for the Operation and Maintenance of United States Military Telegraph Lines	1899	169	Regulations/Telegraph
122	Organized Militia of 1898	1900	357	militia
126	The soldier's handbook for use in the army of the United States	1902	106	general
'128'	Handbook of Subsistence Stores: Comp. Under the Direction of the Commissary General from ...	1900	278	subsistence
166	Drill regulations and outlines of first aid for the Hospital Corps, United States Army	1902	143	drill regulations
180	Drill Regulations for Coast Artillery-1903	1903	166	regulations
172	Notes on Laying, Repairing, Operating, and Testing Submarine Cables	1902	87	FM/Signals
181	Firing regulations for small arms for U. S. Army	1902	296	regulations
187	Signal Corps Manual no.1, Handbook of telephones of the Signal Corps, U.S. Army	1904	102	TM/Telephones
209	A primer and vocabulary of the Moro dialect (Maguindanao)	1903	77	languages
212	Three finding lists issued by the War Department Library	1903	146	general
213	Finding list of the Principal Reference Works in the War Department Library	1903	42	library
214	Rough list of the most important accessions to the War Department Library	1903	library	
217	Notes on Panama	1903	286	countries
224	Bulletin of military notes no.1	1904	398	countries
229	Infantry drill regulations, United States Army, 1904	1904	244	regulations
233	The military laws of the United States	1904	1267	military laws
244	Selected translations pertaining to the Boer War	1905	243	war report
255	Manual for courts-martial, courts of inquiry, and retiring boards, and of other procedure under military law. Revised in the judge-advocate general's office, and published by authority of the secretary of war for use in the army of the United States	1905	220	
258	Handbook of submarine cables. U.S. Signal corps	1905	125	signal corps
261	Small arms firing regulations for the US army and organized militia	1906	115	manual/small arms
267	Drill regulations for coast artillery, United States Army (provisional)	1906	182	drill regulations
273 part V	Reports of military observers attached to the armies in Manchuria during the Russo-Japanese war	1907	223	war report
286	Provisional Regulations for Saber Exercise	1907	49	manual/saber
299	Drill regulations for the infantry, German army. 1906	1907	150	German army
306	Signal Corps manual no.6, Visual Signaling	1910	143	FM/Visual Signaling
308	United States Army Transport Service regulations, 1908	1908	59	regulations
311	The military laws of the United States, 1915	1915	752	laws
314	Influence of the experience of the siege of Port Arthur upon construction of modern fortresses	1908	188	engineers
316	Field service regulations, United States Army, 1905, with amendments to 1908. Prepared by the General Staff, under the direction of the Chief of Staff, U.S. Army. Published by authority of the Secretary of War	1908	219	regulations
319	Regulations of the War Department governing the organized militia, under the Constitution and the laws of the United States	1908	115	regulations
321	Manual for the Subsistence department, United States army. 1910	1910	194	subsistence
322	Small Arms Firing Regulations	1908	327	small arms
323	Drill regulations for field artillery, United States Army (provisional)	1908	272	drill regulations
327	A study of the Iloco language	1909	172	language
328	Drill Regulations for Mountain Artillery (provisional) United States Army, 1908	1908	214	drill regulations/mountain artillery
332	The soldier's handbook for use in the army of the United States	1908	88	manual
333	A guide for the use of officers of the Inspector-General's Department, 1908	1908	304	general
336	Regulations for United States military telegraph lines, U. S. signal corps	1909	108	signal corps
338	Provisional small arms firing manual for the United States Army and for the organized militia of the United States	1909	263	manual
343	Coast Artillery Drill Regulations 1909	1909	267	regulations
345	Military notes on Cuba. 1909	1909	959	countries
346	General, property, and disbursing regulations, Signal Corps, United States Army	1909	174	manual
349	Road notes Cuba-1909	1909	610	countries
353	Acts of Congress, treaties and proclamations relating to noncontiguous territory, Cuba and Santo Domingo and to military affairs. Sixtieth Congress—March 4, 1907, to March 3, 1909. Comp. in the Bureau of insular affairs, War department	1909	656	laws
354	Official table of distances for the guidance of disbursing officers of the army charged with payment of money allowances for travel. By authority of the secretary of war	1910	722	distances
355	Engineer field manual ... I. Reconnaissance. II. Bridges. III. Roads. IV. Railroads. V. Field fortification. VI. Animal transportation. VII. Tables, weights, measures, and specific gravities	1917	541	manual/engineers
356	The Army horseshoer, 1910 : a manua	1910	104	manual
358	Manual for army bakers	1910	89	subsistence
360	Manual of pack transportation ...	1910	242	FM/transport
365	Regulations for the organized militia, under the Constitution and the laws of the United States	1910	174	regulations
366	Visual signaling, Signal Corps, United States Army, 1910	1910	133	manual/signal corps
369	Manual for the Subsistence Department, United States Army, 1910	1910	216	subsistence
370	Manual for courts-martial, courts of inquiry, and retiring boards, and of other procedure under military law. Revised in the judge-advocate general's office, and published by authority of the secretary of war for use in the army of the United States	1910	207	manual
376	Manual for the pay department	1910	212	manual
378	Electrical instruments and telephones of the U.S. Signal corps	1911	332	manual
385	Strength and organization of the armies of France, Germany, Austria, Russia, England, Italy, Mexico and Japan	1911	58	countries
390	Multiplex telephony and telegraphy, by means of electric waves guided by wires	1911	102	manual
393	Drill regulations for field companies of the Signal corps (provisional)	1911	275	drill regulations
394	Infantry drill regulations, United States Army	1911	250	infantry
397	Drill regulations for Field Artillery (horse and light)	1911	402 + appendix	field manual
399	Manual for submarine mining	1912	127	manual
402	Regulations for United States military telegraph lines, Alaskan cables, and telegraph stations, U.S. Signal Corps	1912	137	manual
403	A guide for the use of officers of the Inspector General's Department	1911,1917	486	manual
405	Regulations for the uniform of the United States Army	1912	55	uniforms
409	Classification and index	1912	102	general
412	A digest of opinions of the judge advocates general of the army	1912	1103	military law
415	General, property, and disbursing regulations, Signal Corps, United States Army	1912	174	manual
418	Conventional signs : United States Army maps	1912	22	maps
419	Acts of Congress, treaties, proclamations, and decisions of the Supreme court of the United States, and opinions of the attorney general relating to noncontiguous territory, Cuba and Santo Domingo, and to military affairs ... / Compiled in the Bureau of insular affairs, War department	1912	726	laws
432	Bibliography of state participation in the Civil War, 1861-1866	1913	1166	Library
435	Manual of the bayonet. United States army. 1913	1913	32	TM/Weapons
436	Manual of physical training for use in the United States Army	1914	335	manual
437	Manual of equitation of the French army for 1912	1913	106	Horses
438	Drill regulations and service manual for sanitary troops, United States Army, 1914 : corrected to April 15, 1917 (changes nos. 1 to 4)	1917	235	field manual
440	The soldier's handbook for use in the army of the United States. Revised 1913	1913	91	manual
441	Coast artillery war game	1913	69	artillery, coast, war games
442	Small arms firing manual	1913	268,11	small arms
452	Tentative cavalry drill regulations : United States Army	1913	93	drill regulations
453	Infantry drill regulations, United States Army	1911	278	infantry
454	Regulations for the Army of the United States	1913	416	regulations
459	Regulations governing commercial radio service between ship and shore stations, United States Army, Signal Corps Manual 2A	1914	139	manual
463	Saber exercise	1914	40	manual/saber
464	Signal book, United States army. 1914	1914	88	manual/signal corps
465	United States Army Transport Service regulations	1914	83	regulations/transport
466	Manual of interior guard duty, U.S. Army	1914	88	manual
467	Rules of land warfare	1914	238	general
468	Regulations for the uniform of the US army	1914	68	regulations
471	Regulations for the government of United States army general hospitals, 1914	1914	41	regulations/hospitals
472	The Military Laws of the United States	1915	752	laws
473	Report on fuel tests and the issue of fuel	1914	145	fuel testing
474	Coast artillery drill regulations, United States Army	1914	228	drill regulations
475	Field service regulations : United States Army	1914	244	regulations
476	Manual for noncommissioned officers and privates of infantry of the organized militia and volunteers of the United States	1914	262	manual
482	Drill regulations for field artillery (4.7-inch gun) United States Army (provisional)	1914	114	drill regulations/artillery
484	Specifications for the uniform of the United States army. 1915	1915	61	Specifications/Uniform
486	Manual for farriers, horseshoers, saddlers and wagoners or teamsters	1917	127	manual
490	General, property and disbursing regulations / Signal Corps, United States Army	1915	170	regulations/Signal Corps
492	Ponton manual	1917	95	manual
497	25 Kw Generating Sets	1916	169	manual
499	Regulations for United States military telegraph lines, Alaskan cables, and telegraph stations. Signal Corps Manual no.2	1912,1915	137	regulations
500	Signal book, United States Army	1916	64	manual
504	Manual for the Medical Department, United States Army, 1916	1917	395	manual/medical
505	Epitome of Upton's Military policy of the United States	1916	23	history
506	Changes in organization found necessary during progress of the European war	1916	28	organization
507	Study of the costs of the United States Army in comparison with the cost of armies of other nations	1916	58	finances
508	The coordination of the mobile and coast artillery units of the Army in the national defense	1916	11	manual/artillery
509	Study on the development of large caliber, mobile artillery, and machine guns in the present European war	1916	11	artillery, machine guns
510	Study on educational institutions giving military training as a source of supply of officers for a national army	1916	13	education
511	Study on elimination of unnecessary expense from Army administration	1916	5	finances
512	Finances and costs of the present European war	1916	11	finances
513	Fortifications	1916	22	manual/engineers
514	The general staffs of certain belligerent powers	1916	12	staffs
515	Military Aviation	1916	28	aviation
516	-The militia as organized under the Constitution and its value to the nation as a military asset	1916	12	militia
517	Mobilization of industries and utilization of the commercial and industrial resources of the country for war purposes in emergency	1915	12	war production
518	A modern organization for the regular army and its use as a model in organizing other forces	1916	12	organization
519	Motor transport in campaign	1916	17	motor transport
520	Organization and administration of the War department adapted to a change from peace conditions to a state of war	1916	28	organization/War department
521	1. Organization, training, and mobilization of a force of citizen soldiery. 2. Method of training a citizen army on the outbreak of war to insure its preparedness for field service	1916	20	general
522	Organization, training, and mobilization of a reserve for the regular Army	1916	19	general
523	Organization, training, and mobilization of volunteers under the act of April 25, 1914	1916	22	volunteers
524	Outline of plan for military training in public schools of the United States	1916	9	education
525	The pension roll as affected by the war with Spain in 1898	1916	25	pensions
526	Personnel versus materiel in plans for national defense	1916	14	general
527	Study on places of origin and ability to procure supplies needed in vast quantities in time of war	1916	7	supplies
528	The proper relationship between the army and the press in war	1916	13	manual/press
529	The recruitment of officers in time of peace in the principal armies of Europe	1916	43	general
530	The standardization of methods of military instruction at schools and colleges in the United States	1916	17	military education
531	Statistical comparison of universal and voluntary military service	1916	10	volunteers
532	Strategic location of military depots, arsenals, and manufacturing plants in the United States	1916	6	locations of military objects and plants
533	Sanitary troops in foreign armies	1916	68	sanitary troops
534	Training of forces of belligerent nations of Europe	1916	14	military education
535	Study on the utilization of our resources in various means of transportation and of the services of trained specialists	1916	16	study
536	Technical notes of coast artillery target practice for 1914	1916	46	FM/Artillery
537	The Ohio River. Charts, drawings, and description of features affecting navigation	1916	302	handbook/rivers
538	Provisional drill and service regulations for field artillery (horse and light)	1916	227	drill regulations
539	Military Railways Professional Papers no.32 (Corps of Engineers)	1916	191	FM/Engineers/Railways
540	Coastal Artillery War Game	1916	119	FM/Artillery
541	Technical equipment of the Signal Corps, Signal Corps Manual no.3	1916	554	manual
559	Coast Artillery instruction order	1916	48	manual
560	A manual for courts-martial, courts of inquiry and of other procedure under military law	1918	488	manual
561	Cavalry drill regulations, U.S. army	1916	434	drill regulations
562	Manual for the Quartermaster corps. United States army. 1916	1917	-	FM
563	Manual for army bakers	1917	123	FM/Bakery
564	Manual for army cooks, 1916	1916	290	Cooking
564A	Extracts from Manual for army cooks	1917	116	FM/Cooking
565	Manual of pack transportation	1917	256	horses
569Vol 1	Provisional drill and service regulations for field artillery (6-inch howitzer) 1917 ...	1917	-	regulations
573	Notes on training for rifle fire in trench warfare : comp. from foreign reports / Army War College	1917	21	manual
574	Manual for noncommissioned officers and privates of infantry of the Army of the United States	1917	350	manual
575	Notes on anti-aircraft guns / compiled at the Army War College from the latest available information	1917	28	manual
576	Notes on grenade warfare / compiled from data available on February 15, 1917	1917	64	manual
577	Notes on gas as a weapon in modern warfare / compiled from the latest available information	1917	32	manual
578	Notes on bayonet training : compiled from foreign reports	1917	34	manual
579	Notes on liaison in modern warfare : compiled from the latest sources	1917	13	manual
581	THE TRAINING AND EMPLOYMENT OF BOMBERS	1917	113	manual/bombers
582	Notes for Infantry Officers on Trench Warfare-1917	1917	162	manual/infantry
583	Instructions on the offensive conduct of small units : translated from French edition of 1916	1917	48	manual
584 Part IPart III Part VII Part VIII	Engineer Training Manual Parts I to VIII, inclusive, and all appendices	1917	v.	Field Manual/Engineers
585	Notes on the methods of attack and defense to meet the conditions of modern warfare	1917	35	manual
586	Notes on railroads and mechanical and wagon transport in connection with the service of supply on the western front in France	1917	21	manual
587	Maps and artillery boards	1917	24	field manual
588	Field artillery notes no.1	9	manual/artillery	
590	Specimens of British trench orders	1917	63	orders
591	Notes on cover against shell fire, with special reference to 5.9-inch shells	1917	31	manual
592	Notes on the construction and equipment of trenches	1917	104	manual
593	Memorandum on gas poisoning in warfare:with notes on its pathology and treatment	1917	32	manual
594	Notes on employment of artillery in trench fighting	1917	14	manual
595	The object and conditions of a combined offensive action	1917	117	manual
596	Notes on signal and illuminating devices and the apparatus for projecting them	1917	20	manual
597	Instructions concerning battle maps	1917	22	manual
598	Instructions concerning battle maps, annexes	1917	62	manual
599	Forward intercommunication in battle	1917	59	manual
601	Notes on the tactical use of foreground illumination	1917	15	manual/illumination
602	Summary of the French instructions for higher formations in the attack	1917	22	manual
603	Machine gun notes, no. 1 / edited at Army War College	1917	207	manual
604	Field artillery notes no.2	1917	36	manual/artillery
605	Field service pocket book, United States Army	1917	385	manual
606	Drill regulations for signal troops	1917	462	drill regulations
607	Field battalion signal corps : tables of organization and equipment	1917	31	manual
611	Manual for stable sergeants. 1917	1917	248	horses
613	Instructions for the training of platoons for offensive action	1917	31	manual
614	Manual for noncommissioned officers and privates of field artillery of the army of the United States	1917	281	manual
615	Provisional machine gun firing manual	1917	50	field manual
617	Telegraph battalion, Signal corps. Tables of organization and equipment. July, 1917	1917	22	manual
618	Field artillery notes no.4: from the latest information furnished by British and French sources, including reprints of official circulars	1917	77	manual
619	Field artillery notes no.5: from the latest information furnished by British and French sources, including reprints of official circulars	1917	35	manual
620	Manual for noncommissioned officers and privates of cavalry of the army of the United States	1917	397	manual
621	Cavalry notes	1917	102	manual
623	Instructions for the training of divisions for offensive action	1917	98	manual
624	Instructions on the research and study of information	1917	21	manual
625	Liaison instructions for all arms. Translated from a French manual of 1917	1917	58	manual
626	Manual for commanders of infantry platoons	1917	450	manual
627	Unit equipment manual for the Aviation section, Signal corps	1917	47	manual
628	Field artillery notes no.6	1917	48	manual/artillery
629	Notes on infantry attacks and raids as organized in the present war	1917	55	manual
630	Notes on recent operations	1917	144	campaigns
631	Musketry	1917	255	manual
632	Deep gallery shelters : translated at the Army War College from a French study, July 1917	1917	15	manual
633	Method of instructing skirmishers and small groups of skirmishers	1917	37	manual
634	Notes on fire on aeroplanes	1917	209	manual/anti-aircraft fire
635	Use of mines in trench warfare : from the French school of St. Cyr	1917	13	manual
636	Close combat weapons	1917	16	manual
638	Notes on the German army in the war	1917	47	manual
640	Organization of the telephone listening-in service	1917	10	manual
641	Notes on recent operations Vol 2	1917	52	campaign
642	Infantry in the defense : translated at the Army War College from a French document	1917	27	manual
645	Landscape Sketching			
646	Report on the perception of subterranean sounds and the plotting of subterranean work by sound	1917	59	manual
647	Artillery operations of the Ninth British Corps at Messines, June 1917	1917	124	war report
648	Instructions on the operation of the information service and of the terrestrial observation service of artillery	1917	39	manual
649	Notes on bayonet training, no. 2 : adapted from a Canadian publication	1917	94	manual
654	Field artillery notes no.7	1917	96	manual/artillery
655	Notes on recent operations Vol.3	1917	252	campaign
656	Infantry training	1917	29	manual
657	Field Artillery Training	1917	36	manual
658	Organization and construction of battery emplacements	1917	87	manual
660	Artillery in offensive operations	1917	52	manual/artillery
661	Interpretation of aeroplane photographes	1917	19	manual/photography
662	Drill regulations and service manual for sanitary troops, United States Army	1917	287	drill regulations
663	Notes on Camouflage	1917	10	manual, camouflage
666	The means of communication between aeroplanes and the ground	1917	39	manual
668	Amendment to The object and conditions of a combined offensive action	1917	24	manual
670	Lecture on the supply of ammunition	1917	32	Equipment and supplies
673	Lecture on Fortification			
674	Vocabulary of German military terms and abbreviations	1917	170	languages
675	Field service manual for balloon companies	1917	63	manual/balloon
677	Lecture on high-powered heavy artillery	1917	31	lecture/artillery
679	Sketching methods	1917	52	manual, topography
683	Manual for Army Horseshoers	1917		
684	Manual for Artillery Orientation Officers and Supplement to same			
686	Program of training in gas defense for divisional anti-gas schools	1917	40	manual gas warfare
687	Notes on the French 75-mm. gun	1917	12	manual/artillery
688	Notes on the meteorologie elements affecting artillery	1917	15	manual
689	Notes on the use of smoke	1917	16	manual
690	Provisional note on the acoustic goniometer military telegraph type 1	1917	51	manual/acoustic goniometer
692	Notes on the use of the telemeter graduator and listening-in instruments for mine warfare	1917	16	manual/mine warfare
693	Manual for the battery commander field artillery 75-MM. gun	1917	197	manual/artillery
694	NOTES ON THE IDENTIFICATION OF AEROPLANES	1918	49	manual/airplanes
696	General notes on the use of artillery	1917	47	manual
698	Soldier's handbook of the rifle and score book for special course C : arranged for the United States rifle, model of 1917	1917	131	manual rifle
699	Manual for the battery commander : heavy artillery	1918	131	manual, artillery
700	Note on the listening apparatus for aircraft made by the military telegraph service	1917	32	manual/aircraft
702	Care of Artillery Materiel, Accidents of Fire	1917	20	Field Manual/Artillery
704	Sound liaison	1917	35	manual/liaison
705	Gas Warfare Part I	1918	148	manual gas
705	Gas Warfare Part II	1918	68	manual/gas
705	Gas Warfare Part III	1918	55	Field Manual/gas
705	Gas Ware part IV	1918		
707	General, property, and disbursing regulations. Signal Corps, United States Army	1917	208	regulations
710	Handbook of the 9.45-inch trench mortar materiel with instructions for its care and use	1918	99	TM
716	British tactical notes	1917	53	manual/general
716	Description and instructions for the use of drop bomb, dummy, mark I	1917	9	
718	Description and instructions on the use of signal rockets, Mark I and Mark II	1917	8	manual
720	Provisional drill regulations for field artillery (75 mm. Gun)	1917	117	drill regulations
722	Description and instructions for the use of position lights, mark I and mark II	1917	6	manual
723	Machine-gun drill regulations : provisional, 1917	1918	298	drill regulations
724				
725	Notes on telephone material used in the artillery	1918	43	manual/artillery
727	Camouflage for troops in the Line	1920	24	manual
728	Use of heavy artillery	1918	32	manual/artillery
731	Notes on the automatic time fuse grenade, model 1916, with Appendix 1	1918	8	manual
732	Provisional instruction on the automatic rifle, model 1915 (Chauchat) ...	1918	33	manual
733	Addendum to the instruction on the use of serial observation in liaison with the artillery, January 19, 1917	1918	16	manual
735	Provisional instruction on armored demountable shelters for observers	1918	8	manual/shelters
739	Description and instructions for the use of Very pistol, Mark III and signal light, Mark II	1918	11	TM
741	Description and instructions for the use of bomb sight, mark I	1918	12	manual/bomb sight
742	Handbook of the Barlow heavy drop bomb and release mechanism	1918	46	TM
743	Field artillery notes no.8	1918	68	manual/artillery
744	Power buzzer amplifier	1918	31	manual
745	Meteorological notes and instructions for the use of observers	1918	27	field manual
746	Lecture on Discipline and Training			
749	Machine Gun Notes, No. 2	1918	116	manual/machine gun
751	Handbook of the signal light, mark I, and rifle light, mark I	1918	14	manual
752	Description and instructions for the use of smoke torch, Mark I	1918	8	manual
753	Drill regulations for the 3 anti aircraft gun -1918	1918	142	regulations
754	Bayonet Training Manual	1918	40	Field Manual/General
756	Instruction on Organization of the Terrain (Part I)			
758	Provisional Instruction for the 37mm gun model 1916 R.F	1918	106	manual/artillery
759	Notes on the construction and use of an artillery ruler	1918	15	manual/artillery
760	German experiences in Flanders and at Lens	1918	4	military history
762	Artillery firing, or, instruction on artillery fire (Part IV and part of Part V	1918	62	manual/artillery
763	Provisional drill regulations for trench mortar batteries; 6" Newton and the 240mm. : chapters II, VI, and VIII	1918	33	regulations
766	Handbook for the longue-vue monoculaire a prismes (prismatic telescope), type X (campagne-modele 1917) : (Notes on the prismatic field monocular telescope, type X, model 1917)	1918	17	manual/telescope
768	Infantry Airplane and Infantry Balloon			
769	Air service handbook. Vol. 1. Aviation section, Signal Corps ..	1918	180	manual
772	Scouting and patrolling	1918	56	manual
773	Small compass director : (Goniometre boussole de batterie)	1918	24	manual/compass
774	Trade specifications and occupational index of professions and trades in the Army	1918	239	occupations/classification
776	Instruction and Training of Cavalry			
778	Handbook on machine gun cart, model 1917	1918	44	TM
780	Regulations for motorcycle transportation	1918	111	regulations
783	Instruction on Anti-Tank Defense			
784	Handbook on trench mortar fuzes, Mark VII and Mark VII-E	1918	16	manual
786	Description of the Coleman hold and trigger squeeze device	1918	8	manual
788	Field artillery notes no.9	1918	30	manual/artillery
791	Questions for a platoon commander	1918	8	manual
792	Wire entanglements : addenda no. 1 to Engineer Field Manual	1918	22	manual
794	Instructions on the defensive action of large units in battle	1918	63	manual
798	Tactical order for small units in trench warfare	1918	14	order
800	Protective lighting : illumination as a means of defense of property : the general principles and practice of protective lighting of industrial plants, public works, etc.	1918	54	manual/lighting
801	Manual for the Automatic Pistol (A.E.F. 267, Model 1911), Caliber 45			
802	Instruction for the Offensive Conduct of Small Units (with supplement)			
804	Infantry and tank co-operation and training	1918	32	manual
806	Handbook of the 155-mm. Filloux gun materiel, with instructions for its care	1918	114	manual/artillery
808	Combat instructions, A.E.F. no. 1348, War Plans Division, October, 1918	1918	9	combat instructions
809				
810	Formations for units of ammunition, engineer, and sanitary trains of infantry divisions	1918	21	manual
811	Light trench mortar drill regulations (L.T.M.D.R.)	1918	39	drill regulations/mortar
813	B.C. Data Book A.E.F. NO. 993	1918	192	manual/artillery
814	Firing Record			
816	Provisional drill regulations, Anti-aircraft 75 MM gun, semi-fixed mount, model 1915	1918	85	drill regulations/anti-aircraft gun
817	Manual for trench artillery, United States Army (provisional). Part I, trench artillery	1918	70	manual/artillery
818	Manual for trench artillery, United States Army (provisional). Part II, formations and maneuvers	1918	30	manual/artillery
820	Manual for trench artillery, United States Army (provisional). Part IV, 240 mm. trench mortar	1918	56	manual/artillery
821	Manual for trench artillery, United States Army (provisional). Part V, The 58 no. 2 trench mortar	1918	49	manua/artillery
823	Manual for Hand Bombers and Rifle Grenadiers, A.E.F.	1918	100	FM/General
826	Instructions for the training of the Tank Corps in France	1918	28	manual/tanks
827	Aerial Observation for Artillery-A.E.F.(American Expeditionary Forces No. 80 (based on the French edition of Dec.29, 1917	1918	52	field manual/signal corps
828	Trench line construction	1918	33	manual/signal corps
830	Liaison for All Arms			
837	Compass for Tanks			
839	Description and instructions for the use of smoke torch, Mark	1918	9	manual/smoke torch
840	Handbook on fragmentation drop bombs, Mark IIa, II, I, and III	1918	20	manual/bombs
842	Military notes on training and instruction no.1	1918	59	manual/training
843	Description and instructions for the use of aeroplane flare, mark I and release mechanism, mark 1 for aeroplane flare	1918	17	manual/airplane flare
844	Provisional infantry training manual 1918. Part I. Minimum specifications for trained infantry. Part II. Training methods	1918	44	manual
845	Automatic rifle (Browning)Model of 1918 Service Handbook	1921	30	manual/rifle
849	Training circular no. 5. Infantry training	1918	25	manual/infantry
850	Training circular no.7	1918	12	circular/general
853	Technical training handbook of the Browning automatic rifle model of 1918 (air cooled)	1918	55	manual
859	Training circular no. 23. Training regulations for depot brigades	1918	14	regulations
860	Artillery information service	1918	40	manual
863 part I	Siberia and eastern Russia part I	1918	103	countries
863 part IV	Siberia and eastern Russia part IV	1918	162	countries
864	Method of instructing in military courtesy	1918	42	manual/courtesy
866	Training circular no. 24. Program training for headquarters company, sanitary troops, band, trains and military police of an infantry regiment : combined training of a division	1918	32	training/hqcompany
870	Training circular no. 12. Combined training of a division	1918	22	manual
876 vol.1	Opinions of the judge advocate general of the army volume I	1919	321	law
876 vo.II	Opinions of the judge advocate general of the army volume II	1919	1182	law
877	Provisional regulations for operation and training of division trains, both mechanical and animal drawn	1918	82	regulations/transport
879	Army foot measuring and shoe fitting system : prefaced by a discussion of the theory and importance of correct shoe-fit for enlisted men : a manual for commissioned officers	1918	59	manual
883	Survey of German tactics, 1918, monograph no. 1	1918	34	survey/German army
886	Provisional description of Italian observation balloon	1919	44	manual
893 supplement I	Range tables for French 75-/mm. gun, model 1897	1918	19	TM/Artillery
'894'	Official army register for .	1920	1204	general
899	Compilation of war laws of the various states and insular possessions	1919	218	law
905	Histories of two hundred and fifty-one divisions of the German army which participated in the war (1914–1918)	1920	748	military history Germany
907	Historical report of the chief engineer, including all operations of the Engineer Department, American Expeditionary Forces, 1917–1919	1919	437	history
908	A Handbook of Economic Agencies of the War of 1917,Monograph no.3	1919	539	historical description
942	The Hispano-Suiza motor	1920	58	manual
947	Military explosives	1919	156	manual/explosives
952	Features of the war, by Field Marshal Sir Douglas Haig	1919	28	manual
953	Infantry drill regulations 1919	1919	95	regulations
967				
972	Physical bases of ballistic table computations. Ordnance textbook		1	artillery
978Vol.1	Military laws of the United States. Prepared in the office of the judge advocate general of the army. 1921 Vol.1	1921	military law	
978Vol.2	Military laws of the United States, 1921 Vol.2	1921	1708	military laws
984	The method of numerical integration in exterior ballistics. Ordnance textbook	1921	43	manual
991	Chanard Incendary Bomb	-	-	TM/Incendary bombs
992	A study in troop frontage,Monograph no.4	1920	23	manual
998	The Airplane Propeller	1921	345	Airplanes
1000	The Homing Pigeon	-	-	-
1008	List of War Department documents	1920	20	library
1009	Organization of the services of supply, American expeditionary forces .., Monograph no.7	1921	138	supply
1010	Blanc Mont (Meuse-Argonne-Champagne) .., Monograph no.9	1922	56	Campaigns
1012	A study in battle formation	1920	35	tactics
1016	Operations of the 2d American Corps in the Somme offensive, August 8 to November 11, 1918, Monograph no.10	1920(i.e.1921)	40	military history
1021	Rifle marksmanship	1921	162	manual
1031	Service Handbook of the Bausch & Lomb 15-foot and 22-foot Horizontal Self- Contained Base Range Finders	1918/1926	22	TM/Artillery
1039	The power situation during the war, with appendixes containing reports on conditions in the several power districts	1921	300	general
1051	A course in exterior ballistics : ordnance textbook / prepared by the Ordnance Department, December 1920	1921	127	ballistics
1055(5	Signal Corps Training Pamphlet no.1, Elementary Electricity	1918 and later	23	Handbook/Signal Corps
1069	Radio Communication Pamphlet no.40, The Principles Underlying Radio Communication	1921/1922	-	FM/Radio
1076	Service handbook of the coincidence trainer types A and B for range finding operators	1921	15	technical manual
1090	Service Handbook of the Rocking Bar Sights for 8" Howitzer Carriages	1922	22	manual/artillery
1092	Radio Communication Pamphlet no.9, Amplifiers and Heterodynes	1921	38	FM/Radio
1096	Elements of the Automatic Telephone System Wire Communication Pamphlet no.11	1922	76	Wire Communication Pamphlet
1097	Instructions for using the Cypher Device, Type M-94 Training Pamphlet no.2			Signal Corps/Training Pamphlet
1098	Service handbook of the 9.2-inch howitzer matériel, model of 1917 (Vickers mark I) and 9.2-inch howitzer matériel, model of 1918 (Vickers mark II)	1923	200	TM/Artillery
1103	Service handbook of the altimeter, model of 1916 : prepared in the Office of the Chief of Ordnance, April, 1922	1922	20	TM/Artillery
1105	Service handbook of the altimeter, model of 1916	1922	handbook	..
1108	The Aisne and Montdidier-Noyon Operations, Monograph no.13	1922	34	Campaigns
1109	The Signal Corps and Air Service	1922	128	Campaigns
1112	Primary Batteries, Training Pamphlet no.7	1923	67	Signal Corps
1116	Regulations governing the mobilization of man power for military purposes	1923	28	Regulations
1119	A handbook for the War department general staff. Prepared under the direction of the chief of staff, October, 1923	1924	52	manual
1120	FIELD SERVICE REGULATIONS UNITED STATES ARMY 1923	1924	76	field manual

== See also ==
- United States War Department Forms
