= America Goes Over =

1918 film

- Produced by: US Army Signal Corps
- Distributed by: Committee on Public Information
- Release date: 1918
- Country: United States
- Languages: Silent film English intertitles

America Goes Over was a 1918 American silent documentary propaganda film produced by the US Army Signal Corps in 1918, documenting the activities of the American Expeditionary Forces in World War I under General John J. Pershing. The movie was a product of the Division of Films of the Committee on Public Information, the Washington, DC–based federal agency in charge of wartime propaganda in the United States.

== Plot ==
The film opens with footage of the war prior to America's entry, including many areas where the US never became involved, such as the Italian Front and the conquest of Palestine. The lead-up to America's entry is covered with President Woodrow Wilson warning the Germans about unrestricted submarine warfare.

From that point on, the film takes the viewer to the front line of the Western Front during the final months of the Great War. In between the usual combat footage, which is considerable, there are many "human interest" clips about doughboys on KP, using slop buckets, digging trenches, even one of their lion mascot. Those shots are accompanied by a still cartoon soldier resembling Private SNAFU.

The combat footage, which includes some graphic scenes of the dead and wounded, is accompanied by animated maps of the front, and the gradual inching toward Germany.
