= High Street Cemetery =

Historic cemetery in Massachusetts, United States

- U.S. National Register of Historic Places
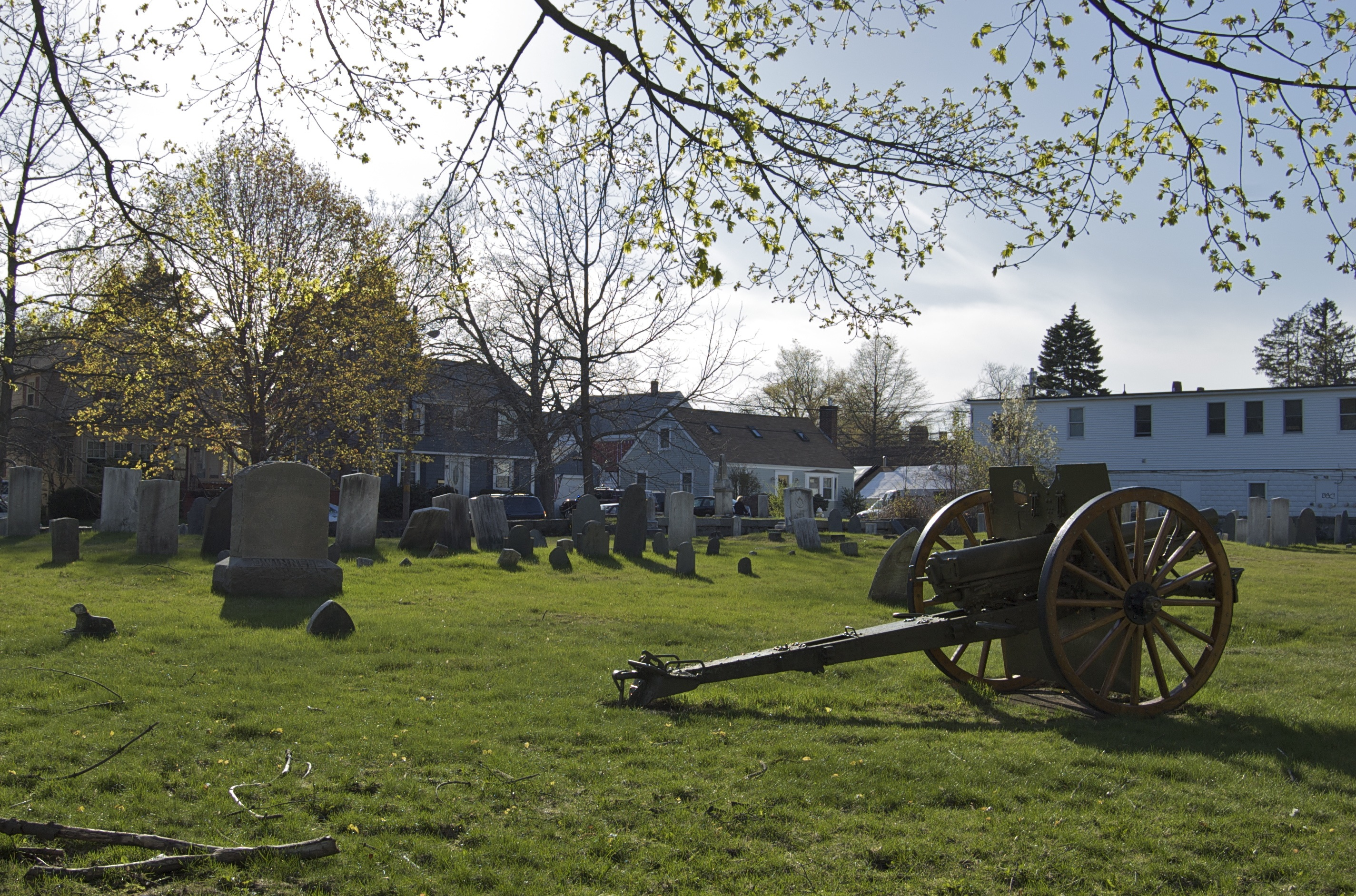
- A cannon placed in the High Street Cemetery.

- Location within Massachusetts Location within the United States
- Location: Danvers, Massachusetts
- Coordinates: 42°33′50″N 70°56′4″W
- NRHP reference No.: 03000382
- Added to NRHP: May 9, 2003

High Street Cemetery is a historic cemetery at 45 High Street in Danvers, Massachusetts. The 0.6-acre (0.24 ha) cemetery is one of the older cemeteries in town, and occupies a prominent location in the town center.

The cemetery was first used sometime in the 18th century; the oldest dated gravestone bears the date 1758, for the wife of Amos Putnam. The parcel was formally deeded for use as a private burying ground in 1805. Its early documented burials include a number of American Revolutionary War veterans, the most notable of which was Samuel Page, a Continental Army captain who later became a local businessman, politician and merchant shipowner.

Although the cemetery was laid out in a fairly rural area, it developed in the first half of the 19th century to become the town center, and the cemetery was soon hemmed in by development on all sides. In 1870 the town voted to acquire the cemetery, and closed it to further use except to those who (according to the 1805) had customarily used it. The last new burial took place in 1875; several graves (particularly some of those of Revolutionary War veterans) were relocated here from other burial grounds in 1929.

The protective wall around the cemetery has its own distinctive history. According to the 1805 deed, the cemetery was supposed to be surrounded by a fence at least 5 feet (1.5 m) high, and was documented as having recently been so enclosed. The cemetery was described in 1848 as being surrounded by a mortared stone wall, but it did not meet the required height. There is some evidence that the wall was once topped by iron fencing, but whether this predates to the town's purchase or not is unknown. Early 20th-century images of the cemetery show a picket fence on High Street. The wrought iron gate carries a date of 1843, but was not described in the 1848 history.

The cemetery was added to the National Register of Historic Places in 2003. Because of the number of veterans' graves in the cemetery, it is a focal point of local Memorial Day commemorations.

== See also ==
- National Register of Historic Places listings in Essex County, Massachusetts
