= Royal Italian Army Order of Battle on 24 May 1915 =

The following list gives and overview of the Royal Italian Army's Order of Battle on 24 May 1915, the day Italy entered World War I. It also includes units, which arrived on in the following weeks at the front.

Infantry regiments consisted of three battalions (numbered I to III). The three battalions fielded a combined twelve infantry companies (numbered 1st to 12th). Some infantry regiments only fielded nine companies, as part of their personnel was deployed overseas in the Italian colonies. Alpini battalions fielded three regular companies, which at the outbreak of war were augmented with companies of the Mobile Militia, which resulted in regular Alpini battalions fielding between four and five companies, while the second line Territorial Militia Alpini battalions fielded between two and three companies. The cyclists battalions and foot battalions of Bersaglieri regiments consisted of three companies. Cavalry regiments consisted of two groups, with the first group fielding three squadrons and the second group fielding two squadrons and a machine gun section. Field artillery regiments consisted of three groups that fielded a combined eight batteries.

For more detailed information about the Alpini units see: Alpini and mountain artillery formations in World War I. For more detailed information about the Bersaglieri units see: Bersaglieri#World War I.

== 1st Army ==
- 1st Army, in Verona — Lieutenant General Roberto Brusati (deployed from Stelvio Pass to Rolle Pass)

=== III Army Corps ===
- III Army Corps — Lieutenant General Vittorio Camerana (deployed from Stelvio Pass to Lake Garda)
  - 5th Division — Lieutenant General Luigi Druetti
    - Brigade "Cuneo"
      - 7th Infantry Regiment (Battalions I, III, IV; 12 × companies — the regiment's II Battalion (5th, 6th, 7th, and 8th companies) was deployed overseas and the regiment formed the IV Battalion (13th, 14th, 15th, and 16th companies) as replacement)
      - 8th Infantry Regiment (Battalions I-III; 12 × companies)
    - Brigade "Palermo"
      - 67th Infantry Regiment (Battalions I-III; 12 × companies)
      - 68th Infantry Regiment (Battalions I, III, IV; 12 × companies — the regiment's II Battalion (5th, 6th, 7th, and 8th companies) was deployed overseas and the regiment formed the IV Battalion (13th, 14th, 15th, and 16th companies) as replacement)
    - 27th Field Artillery Regiment (Groups I-III; 8 × batteries with 75/27 mod. 06 field guns — 1 × Group with 3 × batteries detached to XIV Army Corps) (regiment arrived on 7–13 June)
    - 10th Sappers Company, 2nd Engineer Regiment (Sappers)
  - 6th Division — Lieutenant General Oscar Roffi
    - Brigade "Sicilia"
      - 61st Infantry Regiment (Battalions I-III; 12 × companies)
      - 62nd Infantry Regiment (Battalions I-III; 12 × companies)
    - Brigade "Toscana"
      - 77th Infantry Regiment (Battalions I-III; 12 × companies)
      - 78th Infantry Regiment (Battalions I-III; 12 × companies)
    - 16th Field Artillery Regiment (Groups I-III; 8 × batteries with 75/27 mod. 06 field guns)
    - 11th Sappers Company, 2nd Engineer Regiment (Sappers)
  - 35th Division — Lieutenant General Felice De Chaurand (Reserve division formed shortly before Italy's entry into the war)
    - Brigade "Novara"v
      - 153rd Infantry Regiment (Battalions I-III; 12 × companies)
      - 154th Infantry Regiment (Battalions I-III; 12 × companies)
    - Brigade "Milano"
      - 159th Infantry Regiment (Battalions I-III; 12 × companies)
      - 160th Infantry Regiment (Battalions I-III; 12 × companies)
    - 42nd Field Artillery Regiment (Groups I-II; 6 × batteries with 75/27 mod. 06 field guns)
    - V Group (9th and 10th squadrons), Mobile Militia Cavalry
    - 15th Sappers Company, 1st Engineer Regiment (Sappers)
  - Corps Troops
    - 7th Bersaglieri Regiment (Battalions VIII, X, XI bis — the regiment's XI Battalion was stationed in Libya and the regiment formed the XI bis Battalion (renumbered XLIV Battalion on 5 January 1916) as replacement)
    - XLV Bersaglieri Battalion (Mobile Militia) (formed by the 7th Bersaglieri Regiment)
    - 5th Alpini Regiment (Alpini battalions operated independent of their regiments, which had only training functions)
      - Regular Alpini battalions: Alpini Battalion "Morbegno" (5 × companies), Alpini Battalion "Tirano" (5 × companies), Alpini Battalion "Edolo" (5 × companies), Alpini Battalion "Vestone" (4 × companies)
      - Territorial Militia Alpini battalions: Alpini Battalion "Val d’Intelvi" (3 × companies), Alpini Battalion "Valtellina" (3 × companies), Alpini Battalion "Val Camonica" (3 × companies), Alpini Battalion "Val Chiese" (2 × companies)
    - III Frontier Battalion, Reale Guardia di Finanza
    - Regiment "Cavalleggeri di Aquila" (27th) (5 × squadrons — 3rd Squadron detached to 1st Army)
    - 6th Field Artillery Regiment (Groups I-III; 8 × batteries with 75/27 mod. 06 field guns)
    - 30th Battery, Mountain Artillery Group "Genova", 3rd Mountain Artillery Regiment (with 65/17 mod. 13 mountain guns)
    - II Group, 1st Heavy Field Artillery Regiment (4th and 5th batteries with 149/12 heavy field howitzers)
    - 1 × Miners Battalion (10th, 11th, 18th Miners Companies), 5th Engineer Regiment (Miners)
    - 4th Telegraphers Company, 3rd Engineer Regiment (Telegraphers)
    - 1/2 18th Sappers Company, 2nd Engineer Regiment (Sappers)

=== V Army Corps ===
- V Army Corps — Lieutenant General Florenzio Aliprindi (deployed from Lake Garda to Rolle Pass)
  - 9th Division — Lieutenant General Ferruccio Ferri
    - Brigade "Puglie"
      - 71st Infantry Regiment (Battalions I-III; 12 × companies)
      - 72nd Infantry Regiment (Battalions I-III; 12 × companies)
    - Brigade "Roma"
      - 79th Infantry Regiment (Battalions II, III, IV; 12 × companies — the regiment's I Battalion (1st, 2nd, 3rd, and 4th companies) was deployed overseas and the regiment formed the IV Battalion (13th, 14th, 15th, and 16th companies) as replacement)
      - 80th Infantry Regiment (Battalions I-III; 12 × companies)
    - 29th Field Artillery Regiment (Groups I-III; 8 × batteries with 75/27 mod. 06 field guns)
    - 12th Sappers Company, 1st Engineer Regiment (Sappers)
  - 15th Division — Lieutenant General Luigi Lenchantin
    - Brigade "Abruzzi"
      - 57th Infantry Regiment (Battalions I, III, IV; 12 × companies — the regiment's II Battalion (5th, 6th, 7th, and 8th companies) was deployed overseas and the regiment formed the IV Battalion (13th, 14th, 15th, and 16th companies) as replacement)
      - 58th Infantry Regiment (Battalions I-III; 12 × companies)
    - Brigade "Venezia"
      - 83rd Infantry Regiment (Battalions I-III; 12 × companies)
      - 84th Infantry Regiment (Battalions I, II, IV; 12 × companies — the regiment's III Battalion (9th, 10th, 11th, and 12th companies) was deployed overseas and the regiment formed the IV Battalion (13th, 14th, 15th, and 16th companies) as replacement)
    - 19th Field Artillery Regiment (Groups I-III; 8 × batteries with 75/27 mod. 06 field guns — 1 × Group with 2 × batteries detached to XIV Army Corps) (5 × batteries arrived on 26 May)
    - IV Group (7th and 8th squadrons), Mobile Militia Cavalry (group arrived on 4 June)
    - 1st Sappers Company, 2nd Engineer Regiment (Sappers)
  - 34th Division — Lieutenant General Pasquale Oro (Reserve division formed shortly before Italy's entry into the war)
    - Brigade "Treviso"
      - 115th Infantry Regiment (Battalions I-III; 12 × companies)
      - 116th Infantry Regiment (Battalions I-III; 12 × companies)
    - Brigade "Ivrea"
      - 161st Infantry Regiment (Battalions I-III; 12 × companies)
      - 162nd Infantry Regiment (Battalions I-III; 12 × companies)
    - 41st Field Artillery Regiment (Groups I-II; 6 × batteries with 75/27 mod. 06 field guns)
    - 9th Sappers Company, 2nd Engineer Regiment (Sappers)
    - 21st Squadron, Mobile Militia Cavalry (squadron arrived on 29 June)
    - 23rd Squadron, Mobile Militia Cavalry (squadron arrived on 11 June)
  - Corps Troops
    - 2nd Bersaglieri Regiment (Battalions II bis, IV, XVII — the regiment's II Battalion was stationed in Libya and the regiment formed the II bis Battalion (renumbered LIII Battalion on 5 January 1916) as replacement)
    - 4th Bersaglieri Regiment (Battalions XXVI bis, XXIX, XXXI bis — the regiment's XXVI and XXXI Battalion were stationed in Rhodes and the regiment formed the XXXI bis Battalion as replacement, while the 9th Bersaglieri Regiment formed the XXVI bis Battalion as replacement. On 5 January 1916, the XXVI bis Battalion was renumbered XLIII Battalion, while the XXXI bis Battalion was renumbered XXXVII Battalion)
    - 8th Bersaglieri Regiment (Battalions III bis, V, XII — the regiment's III Battalion was stationed in Libya and the regiment formed the III bis Battalion (renumbered XXXVIII Battalion on 5 January 1916) as replacement)
    - XLI Bersaglieri Battalion (Mobile Militia) (formed by the 4th Bersaglieri Regiment)
    - XLII Bersaglieri Battalion (Mobile Militia) (formed by the 4th Bersaglieri Regiment)
    - XLVIII Bersaglieri Battalion (Mobile Militia) (formed by the 8th Bersaglieri Regiment)
    - 6th Alpini Regiment (Alpini battalions operated independent of their regiments, which had only training functions)
      - Regular Alpini battalions: Alpini Battalion "Verona" (5 × companies), Alpini Battalion "Vicenza" (5 × companies), Alpini Battalion "Bassano" (4 × companies)
      - Territorial Militia Alpini battalions: Alpini Battalion "Val d’Adige" (3 × companies), Alpini Battalion "Val Leogra" (2 × companies), Alpini Battalion "Val Brenta" (2 × companies)
    - 7th Alpini Regiment (Alpini battalions operated independent of their regiments, which had only training functions)
      - Regular Alpini battalions: Alpini Battalion "Feltre" (4 × companies)
      - Territorial Militia Alpini battalions: Alpini Battalion "Val Cismon" (2 × companies)
    - I Frontier Battalion, V Coastal Battalion, VII Coastal Battalion, IX Coastal Battalion, XVII Coastal Battalion, XVIII Coastal Battalion; and the 11th Coastal Company and 51st Coastal Company, Reale Guardia di Finanza
    - Regiment "Cavalleggeri di Catania" (22nd) (Groups I-II; 5 × squadrons) (regiment arrived on 28 May)
    - 5th Field Artillery Regiment (Groups I-III; 8 × batteries with 75/27 mod. 11 field guns)
    - Mountain Artillery Group "Torino-Aosta", 1st Mountain Artillery Regiment (3 × batteries (4th, 5th, and 6th) with 65/17 mod. 13 mountain guns — 52nd Battery detached to the Carnia Zone)
    - Mountain Artillery Group "Vicenza", 2nd Mountain Artillery Regiment (3 × batteries (19th, 20th, and 21st) with 65/17 mod. 13 mountain guns — 57th Battery operates autonomously)
    - Mountain Artillery Group "Oneglia", 3rd Mountain Artillery Regiment (3 × batteries (25th, 26th, and 27th) with 65/17 mod. 13 mountain guns — 59th Battery operates autonomously)
    - Mountain Artillery Group "Genova", 3rd Mountain Artillery Regiment (2 × batteries (28th and 29th) with 65/17 mod. 13 mountain guns — 30th Battery detached to III Army Corps)
    - 1st Battery, Mountain Artillery Group "Torino-Susa", 1st Mountain Artillery Regiment (with 65/17 mod. 13 mountain guns)
    - 8th Battery, Mountain Artillery Group "Torino-Pinerolo", 1st Mountain Artillery Regiment (with 65/17 mod. 13 mountain guns)
    - 57th Battery, Mountain Artillery Group "Vicenza", 2nd Mountain Artillery Regiment (with 65/17 mod. 13 mountain guns)
    - 59th Battery, Mountain Artillery Group "Oneglia", 3rd Mountain Artillery Regiment (with 65/17 mod. 13 mountain guns)
    - 1st, 13th, 14th, and 1/2 7th Miners Companies, 5th Engineer Regiment (Miners)
    - 11th Telegraphers Company, 3rd Engineer Regiment (Telegraphers)
    - 16th Sappers Company, 1st Engineer Regiment (Sappers) (Agno-Assa sector)
    - 16th Sappers Company, 2nd Engineer Regiment (Sappers) (Brenta-Cismon sector)

=== 1st Army Troops ===
- Fortress Verona — Lieutenant General Gaetano Gabbo
  - Brigade "Mantova"
    - 113th Infantry Regiment (Battalions I-III; 12 × companies)
    - 114th Infantry Regiment (Battalions I-III; 12 × companies)
  - 3rd Squadron, Regiment "Cavalleggeri di Aquila" (27th) (detached from III Army Corps)
  - Fortress Verona artillery: 5 × batteries with 87B cannons, 1 × battery with 149/23 G siege guns, 2 × batteries with 57/43 Mod. 1887 cannons
  - 17th Sappers Company, 2nd Engineer Regiment (Sappers)
- III Group, 1st Heavy Field Artillery Regiment (6th and 7th batteries with 149/12 heavy field howitzers)
- 10th Battery with 149/35 A heavy guns (transferred on 29 May to the 1st Siege Park Section, 4th Army)
- 5th Battery with 305/17 heavy howitzers (battery arrived on 1 June)
- 12th Battery with 210/8 heavy mortars (soon transferred to the 1st Siege Park Section, 4th Army)
- 2nd, and 17th Miners Companies, 5th Engineer Regiment (Miners)
- 14th Pontieri Company, 4th Engineer Regiment (Pontieri)
- 16th Telegraphers Company, 3rd Engineer Regiment (Telegraphers)
- 1 × Radio-telegraphers Section
- 1 × Telephotography Squad

== 2nd Army ==
- 2nd Army — Lieutenant General Pietro Frugoni

=== II Army Corps ===
- II Army Corps — Lieutenant General Enzio Reisoli
  - 3rd Division — Lieutenant General Giovanni Prelli
    - Brigade "Ravenna"
      - 37th Infantry Regiment (Battalions III, IV, V; 9 × companies — the regiment's I Battalion (1st, 2nd, 3rd, and 4th companies) and II Battalion (5th, 6th, 7th, and 8th companies) were deployed overseas and the regiment formed the IV and V battalions and 5 × companies (numbered 13th to 17th) as replacement)
      - 38th Infantry Regiment (Battalions I-III; 12 × companies — the regiment's 5th and 6th companies were deployed overseas and the regiment formed the 5th bis and 6th bis companies as replacement)
    - Brigade "Forlì"
      - 43rd Infantry Regiment (Battalions I, II, IV; 9 × companies — the regiment's III Battalion (9th, 10th, 11th, and 12th companies) was deployed overseas and the regiment formed the IV Battalion and 9th bis Company as replacement)
      - 44th Infantry Regiment (Battalions I-III; 12 × companies — the regiment's 2nd Company was deployed overseas and the regiment formed the 2nd bis Company as replacement)
    - 23rd Field Artillery Regiment (Groups I-III; 8 × batteries with 75/27 mod. 06 field guns)
    - 2nd Sappers Company, 2nd Engineer Regiment (Sappers)
  - 4th Division — Major General Cesare Del Mastro
    - Brigade "Livorno"
      - 33rd Infantry Regiment (Battalions I-III; 12 × companies — the regiment's 2nd Company was deployed overseas and the regiment formed the 2nd bis Company as replacement)
      - 34th Infantry Regiment (Battalions IV, V, VI; 12 × companies — the regiment's I Battalion (1st, 2nd, 3rd, and 4th companies), II Battalion (5th, 6th, 7th, and 8th companies), and III Battalion (9th, 10th, 11th, 12th companies) were deployed overseas and the regiment formed the IV, V, and VI battalions and 12 × companies (numbered 13th to 24th) as replacement)
    - Brigade "Lombardia"
      - 73rd Infantry Regiment (Battalions I-III; 12 × companies)
      - 74th Infantry Regiment (Battalions I-III; 12 × companies — the regiment's 6th Company was deployed overseas and the regiment formed the 6th bis Company as replacement)
    - 26th Field Artillery Regiment (Groups I-III; 8 × batteries with 75/27 mod. 06 field guns)
    - 3rd Sappers Company, 2nd Engineer Regiment (Sappers)
  - 32nd Division — Lieutenant General Alberto Piacentini (Reserve division formed shortly before Italy's entry into the war)
    - Brigade "Spezia"
      - 125th Infantry Regiment (Battalions I-III; 12 × companies)
      - 126th Infantry Regiment (Battalions I-III; 12 × companies)
    - Brigade "Firenze"
      - 127th Infantry Regiment (Battalions I-III; 12 × companies)
      - 128th Infantry Regiment (Battalions I-III; 12 × companies)
    - 48th Field Artillery Regiment (Groups I-II; 6 × batteries with 75/27 mod. 06 field guns)
    - I Group (1st and 2nd squadrons), Mobile Militia Cavalry (group arrived on 2 June)
    - 13th Sappers Company, 2nd Engineer Regiment (Sappers)
  - Corps Troops
    - Regiment "Cavalleggeri di Lucca" (16th) — (Groups I-II; 5 × squadrons) (regiment arrived on 31 May)
    - IX Cyclists Battalion, 9th Bersaglieri Regiment
    - X Cyclists Battalion, 10th Bersaglieri Regiment
    - 11th Field Artillery Regiment (Groups I-III; 8 × batteries with 75/27 mod. 11 field guns)
    - VI Group, 1st Heavy Field Artillery Regiment (13th and 14th batteries with 149/12 heavy field howitzers)
    - 6th Telegraphers Company, 3rd Engineer Regiment (Telegraphers)

=== IV Army Corps ===
- IV Army Corps — Lieutenant General Mario Nicolis de Robilant
  - 7th Division — Lieutenant General Nicola D'Avanzo
    - Brigade "Bergamo"
      - 25th Infantry Regiment (Battalions I-III; 12 × companies)
      - 26th Infantry Regiment (Battalions II, III, IV; 12 × companies — the regiment's I Battalion (1st, 2nd, 3rd, and 4th companies) was deployed overseas and the regiment formed the IV Battalion (13th, 14th, 15th, and 16th companies) as replacement)
    - Brigade "Valtellina"
      - 65th Infantry Regiment (Battalions I-III; 12 × companies)
      - 66th Infantry Regiment (Battalions I-III; 12 × companies)
    - 21st Field Artillery Regiment (Groups I-III; 8 × batteries with 75/27 mod. 11 field guns)
    - Mountain Artillery Group "Udine", 2nd Mountain Artillery Regiment (3 × batteries (16th, 17th, and 18th) with 65/17 mod. 13 mountain guns)
    - V Group, 1st Heavy Field Artillery Regiment (11th and 12th batteries with 149/12 heavy field howitzers)
    - 1st Sappers Company, 1st Engineer Regiment (Sappers)
  - 8th Division — Lieutenant General Guglielmo Lang
    - Brigade "Modena"
      - 41st Infantry Regiment (Battalions I-III; 12 × companies — the regiment's 1st Company was deployed overseas and the regiment formed the 1st bis Company as replacement)
      - 42nd Infantry Regiment (Battalions I-III; 12 × companies — the regiment's 1st Company was deployed overseas and the regiment formed the 1st bis Company as replacement)
    - Brigade "Salerno"
      - 89th Infantry Regiment (Battalions I, III, IV; 12 × companies — the regiment's II Battalion (5th, 6th, 7th, and 8th companies) was deployed overseas and the regiment formed the IV Battalion (13th, 14th, 15th, and 16th companies) as replacement)
      - 90th Infantry Regiment (Battalions I-III; 12 × companies — the regiment's 1st Company was deployed overseas and the regiment formed the 1st bis Company as replacement)
    - 28th Field Artillery Regiment (Groups I-III; 8 × batteries with 75/27 mod. 06 field guns)
  - 33rd Division — Lieutenant General Carlo Ricci (Reserve division formed shortly before Italy's entry into the war)
    - Brigade "Emilia"
      - 119th Infantry Regiment (Battalions I-III; 12 × companies)
      - 120th Infantry Regiment (Battalions I-III; 12 × companies)
    - Brigade "Liguria"
      - 157th Infantry Regiment (Battalions I-III; 12 × companies)
      - 158th Infantry Regiment (Battalions I-III; 12 × companies)
    - 40th Field Artillery Regiment (Groups I-II; 6 × batteries with 75/27 mod. 06 field guns)
    - 14th Sappers Company, 1st Engineer Regiment (Sappers)
  - Bersaglieri Division — Lieutenant General Alessandro Raspi
    - 6th Bersaglieri Regiment (Battalions VI, XIII, XIX)
    - 9th Bersaglieri Regiment (Battalions XXVIII, XXX, XXXII)
    - 11th Bersaglieri Regiment (Battalions XV bis, XXVII, XXXIII — the regiment's XV Battalion was stationed in Libya and the regiment formed the XV bis Battalion (renumbered XXXIX Battalion on 5 January 1916) as replacement)
    - 12th Bersaglieri Regiment (Battalions XXI, XXIII, XXXVI)
    - Mountain Artillery Group "Mondovì", 1st Mountain Artillery Regiment (4 × batteries (10th, 11th, 12th, and 54th) with 65/17 mod. 13 mountain guns)
    - 17th Sappers Company, 1st Engineer Regiment (Sappers)
  - Alpini Group A — Colonel Riccardo Tedeschi
    - 4th Alpini Regiment (Alpini battalions operated independent of their regiments, which had only training functions)
      - Regular Alpini battalions: Alpini Battalion "Ivrea" (5 × companies), Alpini Battalion "Aosta" (5 × companies), Alpini Battalion "Intra" (4 × companies)
      - Territorial Militia Alpini battalions: Alpini Battalion "Val d'Orco" (2 × companies), Alpini Battalion "Val Baltea" (2 × companies), Alpini Battalion "Val Toce" (2 × companies)
    - 8th Alpini Regiment (Alpini battalions operated independent of their regiments, which had only training functions)
      - Regular Alpini battalion: Alpini Battalion "Cividale" (4 × companies)
      - Territorial Militia Alpini battalions: Alpini Battalion "Val Natisone" (2 × companies)
    - Mountain Artillery Group "Bergamo", 3rd Mountain Artillery Regiment (4 × batteries (31st, 32nd, 33rd, and 61st) with 65/17 mod. 13 mountain guns)
  - Alpini Group B — Colonel Ernesto Alliana
    - 3rd Alpini Regiment (Alpini battalions operated independent of their regiments, which had only training functions)
      - Regular Alpini battalions: Alpini Battalion "Pinerolo" (4 × companies), Alpini Battalion "Exilles" (4 × companies), Alpini Battalion "Susa" (5 × companies)
      - Territorial Militia Alpini battalions: Alpini Battalion "Val Pellice" (3 × companies), Alpini Battalion "Val Dora" (2 × companies), Alpini Battalion "Val Cenischia" (2 × companies)
    - Mountain Artillery Group "Torino-Pinerolo", 1st Mountain Artillery Regiment (2 × batteries (7th and 9th) with 65/17 mod. 13 mountain guns — 8th Battery detached to V Army Corps)
  - Corps Troops
    - Regiment "Cavalleggeri di Alessandria" (14th) (Groups I-II; 5 × squadrons) (regiment arrived on 3 June)
    - 5th Bersaglieri Regiment (Battalions XIV, XXII bis, XXIV — the regiment's XXII Battalion was stationed in Libya and the regiment formed the XXII bis Battalion (renumbered XLVI Battalion on 5 January 1916) as replacement)
    - V Cyclists Battalion, 5th Bersaglieri Regiment
    - XLVII Bersaglieri Battalion (Mobile Militia) (formed by the 5th Bersaglieri Regiment)
    - 4th Field Artillery Regiment (Groups I-III; 8 × batteries with 75/27 mod. 11 field guns)
    - II Group (3rd and 4th squadrons), Mobile Militia Cavalry (group arrived on 3 June)
    - IV Group, 1st Heavy Field Artillery Regiment (8th, 9th, and 10th batteries with 149/12 heavy field howitzers)
    - 17th Telegraphers Company, 3rd Engineer Regiment (Telegraphers)

=== XII Army Corps ===
- XII Army Corps — Lieutenant General Luigi Segato
  - 23rd Division — Lieutenant General Giovanni Airaldi
    - Brigade "Aosta"
      - 5th Infantry Regiment (Battalions II, III, IV; 9 × companies — the regiment's I Battalion (1st, 2nd, 3rd, and 4th companies) was deployed overseas and the regiment formed the IV Battalion and 13th Company as replacement)
      - 6th Infantry Regiment (Battalions I, III, IV; 12 × companies — the regiment's II Battalion (5th, 6th, 7th, and 8th companies) was deployed overseas and the regiment formed the IV Battalion (13th, 14th, 15th, and 16th companies) as replacement)
    - Brigade "Verona"
      - 85th Infantry Regiment (Battalions I-III; 12 × companies)
      - 86th Infantry Regiment (Battalions I, III, IV; 9 × companies — the regiment's II Battalion (5th, 6th, 7th, and 8th companies) was deployed overseas and the regiment formed the IV Battalion and 13th Company as replacement)
    - 22nd Field Artillery Regiment (Groups I-III; 8 × batteries with 75/27 mod. 06 field guns)
    - I Group, 10th Field Artillery Regiment (3 × batteries with 75/27 mod. 06 field guns — detached from XII Army Corps)
    - 12th Sappers Company, 2nd Engineer Regiment (Sappers)
  - 24th Division — Major General Gustavo Fara
    - Brigade "Piemonte"
      - 3rd Infantry Regiment (Battalions II, III, IV; 9 × companies — the regiment's I Battalion (1st, 2nd, 3rd, and 4th companies) was deployed overseas and the regiment formed the IV Battalion and 13th Company as replacement)
      - 4th Infantry Regiment (Battalions I, II, IV; 12 × companies — the regiment's III Battalion (9th, 10th, 11th, and 12th companies) was deployed overseas and the regiment formed the IV Battalion (13th, 14th, 15th, and 16th companies) as replacement)
    - Brigade "Napoli"
      - 75th Infantry Regiment (Battalions I, II, IV; 9 × companies — the regiment's III Battalion (9th, 10th, 11th, and 12th companies) was deployed overseas and the regiment formed the IV Battalion and 9th bis Company as replacement)
      - 76th Infantry Regiment (Battalions I-III; 12 × companies)
    - 36th Field Artillery Regiment (Groups I-II; 5 × batteries with 75/27 mod. 11 field guns; and the Mountain Artillery Group "Messina" with 3 × batteries (37th, 38th, and 39th) with 65/17 mod. 13 mountain guns)
    - III Group, 10th Field Artillery Regiment (3 × batteries with 75/27 mod. 06 field guns — detached from XII Army Corps)
    - 4th Sappers Company, 2nd Engineer Regiment (Sappers)
  - Corps Troops
    - Regiment "Cavalleggeri di Lodi" (15th) (Groups I-II; 5 × squadrons) (regiment arrived on 4 June)
    - 10th bis Bersaglieri Regiment (Battalions XVI bis, XXXIV bis, XXXV bis — the 10th Bersaglieri Regiment was deployed to Vlorë in Albania and the regiment's depot in Palermo formed the 10th bis Bersaglieri Regiment as replacement. On 5 January 1916, the 10th bis Bersaglieri Regiment was renumbered 16th Bersaglieri Regiment and its battalions as follows: XVI bis renumbered LVII Battalion, XXXIV bis renumbered LVIII Battalion, XXXV bis renumbered LXIII Battalion)
    - 10th Field Artillery Regiment (Groups I-III; 8 × batteries with 75/27 mod. 06 field guns; I Group with 3 × batteries detached to 23rd Division and III Group with 3 × batteries detached to 24th Division)
    - IV Group, 2nd Heavy Field Artillery Regiment (8th, 9th, and 10th batteries with 149/12 heavy field howitzers)
    - 9th Telegraphers Company, 3rd Engineer Regiment (Telegraphers)

=== 2nd Army Troops ===
- 2 x Pack Howitzer Groups with 4 x batteries per group (1st, 4th, 5th, 8th, 9th, 10th, 11th, and 20th pack batteries) with 70/15 mountain guns
- 1 × Pontieri Battalion (6th, 7th, 8th, and 13th Pontieri companies), 4th Engineer Regiment (Pontieri)
- 8th Miners Company, 5th Engineer Regiment (Miners)
- 24th Telegraphers Company, 3rd Engineer Regiment (Telegraphers)
- Military Aviation Corps: 6th, 7th, and 8th Reconnaissance and Combat Squadrons flying Nieuport 10 fighters
- 3 × Aerostatic Balloons Field Sections
- 1 × Radio-telegraphers Section
- 1 × Field Photography Squad
- Attached siege artillery:
  - 2 x Groups with 2 x batteries per group (1st, 6th, 11th, and 12th batteries) with 149/35 A heavy guns
  - 1 x Group with 3 x batteries (5th, 6th, and 7th batteries) with 149/23 G siege guns

== 3rd Army ==
- 3rd Army — Lieutenant General Prince Emanuele Filiberto, Duke of Aosta (24 to 26 May: Lieutenant General General Garioni)

=== VI Army Corps ===
- VI Army Corps — Lieutenant General Carlo Ruelle
  - 11th Division — Lieutenant General Ettore Mambretti
    - Brigade "Re"
      - 1st Infantry Regiment (Battalions I-III; 12 × companies)
      - 2nd Infantry Regiment (Battalions I-III; 12 × companies)
    - Brigade "Pistoia"
      - 35th Infantry Regiment (Battalions I, III, IV; 12 × companies — the regiment's II Battalion (5th, 6th, 7th, and 8th companies) was deployed overseas and the regiment formed the IV Battalion (13th, 14th, 15th, and 16th companies) as replacement)
      - 36th Infantry Regiment (Battalions I-III; 12 × companies)
    - 14th Field Artillery Regiment (Groups I-III; 8 × batteries with 75/27 mod. 06 field guns) (3 × batteries arrived on 27 May)
    - I Group, 1st Heavy Field Artillery Regiment (1st, 2nd, and 3rd batteries with 149/12 heavy field howitzers)
    - 1 x Group with 3 × pack batteries (2nd, 7th, and 14th) with 70/15 mountain guns
    - 6th Sappers Company, 2nd Engineer Regiment (Sappers)
  - 12th Division — Major General Oreste Zavattari
    - Brigade "Casale"
      - 11th Infantry Regiment (Battalions I-III; 12 × companies)
      - 12th Infantry Regiment (Battalions I-III; 12 × companies)
    - Brigade "Pavia"
      - 27th Infantry Regiment (Battalions I-III; 12 × companies)
      - 28th Infantry Regiment (Battalions I-III; 12 × companies)
    - 30th Field Artillery Regiment (Groups I-III; 8 × batteries with 75/27 mod. 06 field guns)
    - 7th Sappers Company, 2nd Engineer Regiment (Sappers)
  - 1st Cavalry Division "Friuli" — Lieutenant General Nicola Pirozzi
    - I Cavalry Brigade
      - Regiment "Cavalleggeri di Monferrato" (13th) (Groups I-II; 5 × squadrons — 1 × squadron detached to the Carnia Zone)
      - Regiment "Cavalleggeri di Roma" (20th) (Groups I-II; 5 × squadrons)
    - II Cavalry Brigade
      - Regiment "Genova Cavalleria" (4th) (Groups I-II; 5 × squadrons)
      - Regiment "Lancieri di Novara" (5th) (Groups I-II; 5 × squadrons)
    - 94th Infantry Regiment, Brigade "Messina" (Battalions I-III; 12 × companies) (detached from the 13th Division, VII Army Corps)
    - I Battalion, 20th Infantry Regiment, Brigade "Brescia" (detached from 22nd Division, XI Army Corps)
    - VIII Cyclists Battalion, 8th Bersaglieri Regiment
    - XI Cyclists Battalion, 11th Bersaglieri Regiment
    - II Group, Horse Artillery Regiment (2 × batteries (3rd and 4th) with 75/27 mod. 12 guns)
    - II Group, 3rd Field Artillery Regiment (2 × batteries with 75/27 mod. 11 field guns — detached from I Army Corps)
  - Corps Troops
    - Regiment "Cavalleggeri di Caserta" (17th) (Groups I-II; 5 × squadrons) (regiment arrived on 28 May)
    - VI Cyclists Battalion, 6th Bersaglieri Regiment
    - XII Cyclists Battalion, 12th Bersaglieri Regiment
    - II Frontier Battalion, Reale Guardia di Finanza
    - 3rd Field Artillery Regiment (Groups I-III; 8 × batteries with 75/27 mod. 11 field guns; II Group with 2 × batteries (4th and 5th) detached to the 1st Cavalry Division "Friuli")
    - II Group, 2nd Heavy Field Artillery Regiment (4th and 5th batteries with 149/12 heavy field howitzers)
    - 8th Telegraphers Company, 3rd Engineer Regiment (Telegraphers)
    - 1/2 18th Sappers Company, 2nd Engineer Regiment (Sappers)
    - 19th Miners Company, 5th Engineer Regiment (Miners)
    - 12th Pontieri Company, 4th Engineer Regiment (Pontieri)
    - Military Aviation Corps: 1st and 2nd Reconnaissance and Combat Squadrons flying Blériot XI planes

=== VII Army Corps ===
- VII Army Corps — Lieutenant General Vincenzo Garioni
  - 13th Division — Lieutenant General Cleto Angelotti
    - Brigade "Granatieri di Sardegna"
      - 1st Regiment "Granatieri di Sardegna" (Battalions I, II, IV; 12 × companies — the regiment's III Battalion (9th, 10th, 11th, and 12th companies) was deployed overseas and the regiment formed the IV Battalion (13th, 14th, 15th, and 16th companies) as replacement)
      - 2nd Regiment "Granatieri di Sardegna" (Battalions I-III; 12 × companies)
    - Brigade "Messina"
      - 93rd Infantry Regiment (Battalions III, IV, V; 9 × companies; — the regiment's I Battalion (1st, 2nd, 3rd, and 4th companies) and II Battalion (5th, 6th, 7th, 8th companies) were deployed overseas and the regiment formed the IV and V battalions and 5 × companies (numbered 13th to 17th) as replacement)
      - 94th Infantry Regiment (detached to 1st Cavalry Division "Friuli", VI Army Corps)
    - 31st Field Artillery Regiment (Groups I-III; 8 × batteries with 75/27 mod. 06 field guns) (regiment arrived on 27 May)
    - 12th Pack Battery with 70/15 mountain guns
    - 2nd Sappers Company, 1st Engineer Regiment (Sappers)
  - 14th Division — Major General Giacinto Rostagno
    - Brigade "Pinerolo"
      - 13th Infantry Regiment (Battalions I-III; 12 × companies)
      - 14th Infantry Regiment (Battalions I-III; 12 × companies)) (I Battalion detached to 2nd Cavalry Division "Veneto", XI Army Corps)
    - Brigade "Acqui"
      - 17th Infantry Regiment (Battalions I-III; 12 × companies)
      - 18th Infantry Regiment (Battalions II, IV, V; 9 × companies; — the regiment's I Battalion (1st, 2nd, 3rd, and 4th companies) and III Battalion (9th, 10th, 11th, 12th companies) were deployed overseas and the regiment formed the IV and V battalions and 5 × companies (numbered 13th to 17th) as replacement)
    - 18th Field Artillery Regiment (Groups I-III; 8 × batteries with 75/27 mod. 06 field guns) (regiment arrived on by 28 May)
    - 7th Sappers Company, 1st Engineer Regiment (Sappers)
  - Corps Troops
    - Regiment "Cavalleggeri di Udine" (29th) (Groups I-II; 5 × squadrons) (regiment arrived on 10 June)
    - 2nd Field Artillery Regiment (Groups I-III; 8 × batteries with 75/27 mod. 11 field guns)
    - 13th Telegraphers Company, 3rd Engineer Regiment (Telegraphers) (had not arrived on by 24 May)
    - 6th Battery with 305/17 heavy howitzers (battery arrived on 10 July)

=== XI Army Corps ===
- XI Army Corps — Lieutenant General Giorgio Cigliana
  - 21st Division — Lieutenant General Carlo Mazzoli
    - Brigade "Regina" (Brigade headquarters detached to 2nd Cavalry Division "Veneto", XI Army Corps)
      - 9th Infantry Regiment (Battalions I-III; 12 × companies) (had not arrived on by 24 May)
      - 10th Infantry Regiment (detached to 2nd Cavalry Division "Veneto", XI Army Corps)
    - Brigade "Pisa" (had not arrived on by 24 May)
      - 29th Infantry Regiment (Battalions I-III; 12 × companies)
      - 30th Infantry Regiment (Battalions II, III, IV; 12 × companies — the regiment's I Battalion (1st, 2nd, 3rd, and 4th companies) was deployed overseas and the regiment formed the IV Battalion (13th, 14th, 15th, and 16th companies) as replacement)
    - 35th Field Artillery Regiment (Groups I-III; 8 × batteries with 75/27 mod. 11 field guns) (regiment arrived on by 28-30 May)
    - 4th Sappers Company, 1st Engineer Regiment (Sappers) (had not arrived on by 24 May)
  - 22nd Division — Lieutenant General Vittorio Signorile
    - Brigade "Brescia"
      - 19th Infantry Regiment (Battalions I-III; 12 × companies)
      - 20th Infantry Regiment (Battalions I, III, IV; 12 × companies — the regiment's II Battalion (5th, 6th, 7th, and 8th companies) was deployed overseas and the regiment formed the IV Battalion (13th, 14th, 15th, and 16th companies) as replacement) (I Battalion detached to the 1st Cavalry Division "Friuli", VI Army Corps)
    - Brigade "Ferrara" (had not arrived on by 24 May)
      - 47th Infantry Regiment (Battalions III, IV, V; 9 × companies; — the regiment's I Battalion (1st, 2nd, 3rd, and 4th companies) and II Battalion (5th, 6th, 7th, and 8th companies) were deployed overseas and the regiment formed the IV and V battalions and 5 × companies (numbered 13th to 17th) as replacement)
      - 48th Infantry Regiment (Battalions II, IV, V; 9 × companies; — the regiment's I Battalion (1st, 2nd, 3rd, and 4th companies) and III Battalion (9th, 10th, 11th, 12th companies) were deployed overseas and the regiment formed the IV and V battalions and 5 × companies (numbered 13th to 17th) as replacement)
    - 15th Field Artillery Regiment (Groups I-III; 8 × batteries with 75/27 mod. 11 field guns) (regiment arrived on 28 May)
    - 3rd Sappers Company, 1st Engineer Regiment (Sappers) (had not arrived on by 24 May)
  - 2nd Cavalry Division "Veneto" — Lieutenant General Giovanni Vercellana
    - III Cavalry Brigade
      - Regiment "Lancieri di Milano" (7th) (Groups I-II; 5 × squadrons)
      - Regiment "Lancieri Vittorio Emanuele II" (10th) (Groups I-II; 5 × squadrons)
    - IV Cavalry Brigade
      - Regiment "Lancieri di Aosta" (6th) (Groups I-II; 5 × squadrons) (regiment arrived on 9 June)
      - Regiment "Lancieri di Mantova" (25th) (Groups I-II; 5 × squadrons) (regiment arrived on 30 May)
    - Brigade "Regina" Headquarters (detached from 21st Division, XI Army Corps)
      - 10th Infantry Regiment (Battalions I-III; 12 × companies)
    - III Cyclists Battalion, 3rd Bersaglieri Regiment
    - VII Cyclists Battalion, 7th Bersaglieri Regiment
    - I Battalion, 1st Regiment "Granatieri di Sardegna", Brigade "Granatieri di Sardegna" (detached from 13th Division, VII Army Corps)
    - I Battalion, 14th Infantry Regiment, Brigade "Pinerolo" (detached from 14th Division, VII Army Corps)
    - I Group, Horse Artillery Regiment (2 × batteries (1st and 2nd) with 75/27 mod. 12 guns)
    - III Group, 2nd Heavy Field Artillery Regiment (6th and 7th batteries with 149/12 heavy field howitzers)
    - 16th and 17th Pack Batteries with 70/15 mountain guns
  - Corps Troops
    - Regiment "Cavalleggeri di Foggia" (11th) (Groups I-II; 5 × squadrons) (regiment arrived on 2 June)
    - 9th Field Artillery Regiment (Groups I-III; 8 × batteries with 75/27 mod. 11 field guns) (regiment arrived on by 30 May)
    - 5th Pontieri Company, 4th Engineer Regiment (Pontieri) (had not arrived on by 24 May)
    - 10th Telegraphers Company, 3rd Engineer Regiment (Telegraphers) (had not arrived on by 24 May)

=== 3rd Army Troops ===
- X Coastal Battalion, XI Coastal Battalion, XII Coastal Battalion, XIII Coastal Battalion, XIV Coastal Battalion, and XV Coastal Battalion, Reale Guardia di Finanza
- I Group, 2nd Heavy Field Artillery Regiment (1st, 2nd, and 3rd batteries with 149/12 heavy field howitzers)
- 19th Pack Battery with 70/15 mountain guns
- 5th Miners Company, 5th Engineer Regiment (Miners)
- 21st Telegraphers Company, 3rd Engineer Regiment (Telegraphers)
- 4th, 10th, and 11th Pontieri companies, 4th Engineer Regiment (Pontieri)
- Military Aviation Corps: 3rd, 13th, and 14th Reconnaissance and Combat Squadrons flying Blériot XI planes; 11th and 12th Reconnaissance and Combat Squadrons flying Farman MF.11 planes)
- 2 × Aerostatic Balloons Field Sections
- 1 × Radio-telegraphers Section
- 1 × Field Photography Squad
- Attached siege artillery:
  - 1 x Group with 4 x batteries (1st, 2nd, 3rd, and 4th batteries) with 149/23 G siege guns

== 4th Army ==
- 4th Army — Lieutenant General Luigi Nava

=== I Army Corps ===
- I Army Corps — Lieutenant General Ottavio Ragni
  - 1st Division — Lieutenant General Alfonso Pettiti di Roreto
    - Brigade "Parma"
      - 49th Infantry Regiment (Battalions I-III; 12 × companies)
      - 50th Infantry Regiment (Battalions I, IV, V; 9 × companies — the regiment's II Battalion (5th, 6th, 7th, and 8th companies) and III Battalion 9th, 10th, 11th, and 12th companies) were deployed overseas and the regiment formed the IV and V battalions and 5 × companies (numbered 13th to 17th) as replacement)
    - Brigade "Basilicata"
      - 91st Infantry Regiment (Battalions I-III; 12 × companies)
      - 92nd Infantry Regiment (Battalions I-III; 12 × companies)
    - 25th Field Artillery Regiment (Groups I-III; 8 × batteries with 75/27 mod. 06 field guns — 1 × Group with 3 × batteries detached to 31st Division) (regiment arrived on 1 June)
    - 6th and 13th Pack Batteries with 70A mountain guns (batteries arrived on 20 June)
    - 5th Sappers Company, 2nd Engineer Regiment (Sappers)
  - 2nd Division — Lieutenant General Saverio Nasalli Rocca
    - Brigade "Como"
      - 23rd Infantry Regiment (Battalions I, IV, V; 9 × companies — the regiment's II Battalion (5th, 6th, 7th, and 8th companies) and III Battalion 9th, 10th, 11th, and 12th companies) were deployed overseas and the regiment formed the IV and V battalions and 5 × companies (numbered 13th to 17th) as replacement)
      - 24th Infantry Regiment (Battalions I-III; 12 × companies)
    - Brigade "Umbria"
      - 53rd Infantry Regiment (Battalions I-III; 12 × companies)
      - 54th Infantry Regiment (Battalions I-III; 12 × companies)
    - 17th Field Artillery Regiment (Groups I-III; 8 × batteries with 75/27 mod. 06 field guns)
  - 10th Division — Lieutenant General Giovanni Scrivante
    - Brigade "Marche"
      - 55th Infantry Regiment (Battalions I-III; 12 × companies)
      - 56th Infantry Regiment (Battalions I-III; 12 × companies)
    - Brigade "Ancona"
      - 69th Infantry Regiment (Battalions I-III; 12 × companies)
      - 70th Infantry Regiment (Battalions I-III; 12 × companies)
    - 20th Field Artillery Regiment (Groups I-III; 8 × batteries with 75/27 mod. 06 field guns)
    - 11th Sappers Company, 1st Engineer Regiment (Sappers)
    - 14th Sappers Company, 2nd Engineer Regiment (Sappers)
  - Corps Troops
    - Regiment "Cavalleggeri di Padova" (21st) (Groups I-II; 5 × squadrons) (regiment arrived on 30 May)
    - 8th Field Artillery Regiment (Groups I-III; 8 × batteries with 75/27 mod. 06 field guns)
    - 12th Telegraphers Company, 3rd Engineer Regiment (Telegraphers)
    - 1/2 7th, and 21st Miners Companies, 5th Engineer Regiment (Miners)

=== IX Army Corps ===
- IX Army Corps — Lieutenant General Pietro Marini
  - 17th Division — Lieutenant General Diomede Saveri
    - Brigade "Reggio"
      - 45th Infantry Regiment (Battalions I-III; 12 × companies)
      - 46th Infantry Regiment (Battalions I-III; 12 × companies)
    - Brigade "Torino"
      - 81st Infantry Regiment (Battalions I-III; 12 × companies)
      - 82nd Infantry Regiment (Battalions IV, V, VI; 9 × companies — the regiment's I, II, and III battalions (1st to 12th companies) were deployed overseas and the regiment formed the IV, V, and VI battalions and 9 × companies (numbered 13th to 21st) as replacement)
    - 13th Field Artillery Regiment (Groups I-III; 8 × batteries with 75/27 mod. 11 field guns) (regiment arrived on 31 May)
    - 5th Sappers Company, 1st Engineer Regiment (Sappers)
  - 18th Division — Lieutenant General Vittorio Carpi
    - Brigade "Alpi"
      - 51st Infantry Regiment (Battalions I-III; 12 × companies)
      - 52nd Infantry Regiment (Battalions II, III, IV; 12 × companies — the regiment's I Battalion (1st, 2nd, 3rd, and 4th companies) was deployed overseas and the regiment formed the IV Battalion (13th, 14th, 15th, and 16th companies) as replacement)
    - Brigade "Calabria"
      - 59th Infantry Regiment (Battalions I-III; 12 × companies)
      - 60th Infantry Regiment (Battalions II, III, IV; 12 × companies — the regiment's I Battalion (1st, 2nd, 3rd, and 4th companies) was deployed overseas and the regiment formed the IV Battalion (13th, 14th, 15th, and 16th companies) as replacement)
    - 33rd Field Artillery Regiment (Groups I-III; 8 × batteries with 75/27 mod. 11 field guns)
    - 8th Sappers Company, 1st Engineer Regiment (Sappers)
  - Corps Troops
    - 3rd Bersaglieri Regiment (Battalions XVIII, XX, XXV)
    - 3rd Alpini Regiment (Alpini battalions operated independent of their regiments, which had only training functions)
      - Regular Alpini battalions: Alpini Battalion "Fenestrelle" (4 × companies)
      - Territorial Militia Alpini battalions: Alpini Battalion "Val Chisone" (3 × companies)
    - 7th Alpini Regiment (Alpini battalions operated independent of their regiments, which had only training functions)
      - Regular Alpini battalions: Alpini Battalion "Pieve di Cadore" (4 × companies), Alpini Battalion "Belluno" (4 × companies)
      - Territorial Militia Alpini battalions: Alpini Battalion "Val Piave" (2 × companies), Alpini Battalion "Val Cordevole" (2 × companies)
    - Regiment "Lancieri di Firenze" (9th) (Groups I-II; 5 × squadrons) (regiment arrived on 5 June)
    - 1st Field Artillery Regiment (Groups I-III; 8 × batteries with 75/27 mod. 11 field guns) (2 × batteries arrived on 26 May)
    - Mountain Artillery Group "Torino-Susa", 1st Mountain Artillery Regiment (2 × batteries (2nd and 3rd) with 65/17 mod. 13 — 1st Battery detached to V Army Corps and 51st Battery detached to the Carnia Zone)
    - Mountain Artillery Group "Belluno", 2nd Mountain Artillery Regiment (4 × batteries (22nd, 23rd, 24th, and 58th) with 65/17 mod. 13 mountain guns)
    - Mountain Artillery Group "Como", 3rd Mountain Artillery Regiment (3 × batteries (34th, 35th, 36th) with 65/17 mod. 13 mountain guns)
    - 5th Telegraphers Company, 3rd Engineer Regiment (Telegraphers)

=== 4th Army Troops ===
- 1 × Mobile Territorial Infantry Regiment (3 × battalions with reserve personnel)
- XVI Frontier Battalion, Reale Guardia di Finanza
- V Group, 2nd Heavy Field Artillery Regiment (11th and 12th batteries with 149/12 heavy field howitzers)
- VI Group, 2nd Heavy Field Artillery Regiment (13th and 14th batteries with 149/12 heavy field howitzers)
- 1 × Miners Battalion (12th, 16th, and 20th Miners Companies), 5th Engineer Regiment (Miners)
- 1st Pontieri Company, 4th Engineer Regiment (Pontieri)
- 22nd Telegraphers Company, 3rd Engineer Regiment (Telegraphers)
- 1 × Radio-telegraphers Section
- 1 × Telephotography Squad
- Attached siege artillery:
  - 1st Siege Park Section
    - 10th Battery with 149/35 A heavy guns (transferred on 29 May from the 1st Army)
    - 2nd Battery with 210/13 heavy howitzers (battery arrived on 30 May)
    - 7th Battery with 280 A heavy howitzers (battery arrived on 6 June)
    - 9th Battery with 210/8 heavy mortars (battery arrived on 31 May, later also the 12th Battery was transferred from the 1st Army to the 1st Siege Park Section)
  - 2nd Siege Park Section
    - 8th and 9th batteries with 149/35 A heavy guns
    - 4th Battery with 280 A heavy howitzers (battery arrived on 6 June)
    - 1st and 2nd batteries with 305/17 heavy howitzers (1st Battery arrived on 1 June, 2nd Battery arrived on 2 June)
    - 10th and 11th batteries with 210/8 heavy mortars
  - 2nd bis Siege Park Section
    - 7th Battery with 149/35 A heavy guns
    - 5th and 6th batteries with 280 A heavy howitzers (batteries arrived on 3 June)
    - 7th and 8th batteries with 210/8 heavy mortars (batteries arrived on 3 June)

== High Command units ==
- High Command (Comando Supremo) — Lieutenant General Luigi Cadorna
  - Brigade "Padova" (assigned to the defence of Venice)
    - 117th Infantry Regiment (Battalions I-III; 12 × companies)
    - 118th Infantry Regiment (Battalions I-III; 12 × companies)
  - Brigade "Trapani"
    - 143rd Infantry Regiment (Battalions I-III; 12 × companies) (departed for Libya on 6 May)
    - 144th Infantry Regiment (Battalions I-III; 9 × companies)
    - 149th Infantry Regiment (Battalions I-III; 12 × companies) (in Brindisi at the disposition of the Royal Italian Navy until 23 June; arrived on at the front on 4 July and joined the brigade)
  - Royal Carabinieri Regiment (Battalions I-III; 9 × companies)
  - 19th Sappers Company, 1st Engineer Regiment (Sappers) (assigned to the defence of Venice)
  - 1st Telegraphers Company, 3rd Engineer Regiment (Telegraphers) (assigned to the defence of Venice)
  - 7th Telegraphers Company, 3rd Engineer Regiment (Telegraphers)
  - 15th Pontieri Company, 4th Engineer Regiment (Pontieri) (assigned to the defence of Venice)
  - 15th Miners Company, 5th Engineer Regiment (Miners) (assigned to the defence of Venice)
  - Military Aviation Corps: 4th Reconnaissance and Combat Squadron flying Blériot XI planes; 5th Reconnaissance and Combat Squadron flying Nieuport 10 fighters; 9th and 10th Reconnaissance and Combat Squadrons flying Farman MF.11 planes
  - Dirigibles P4, P5, M1

=== Carnia Zone ===
- Carnia Zone — Lieutenant General Clemente Lequio
  - 1st Alpini Regiment (Alpini battalions operated independent of their regiments, which had only training functions)
    - Regular Alpini battalions: Alpini Battalion "Ceva" (5 × companies), Alpini Battalion "Pieve di Teco" (5 × companies), Alpini Battalion "Mondovì" (4 × companies)
    - Territorial Militia Alpini battalions: Alpini Battalion "Val Tanaro" (2 × companies), Alpini Battalion "Val Arroscia" (3 × companies), Alpini Battalion "Val Ellero" (2 × companies)
  - 2nd Alpini Regiment (Alpini battalions operated independent of their regiments, which had only training functions)
    - Regular Alpini battalions: Alpini Battalion "Borgo San Dalmazzo" (5 × companies), Alpini Battalion "Dronero" (5 × companies), Alpini Battalion "Saluzzo" (5 × companies)
    - Territorial Militia Alpini battalions: Alpini Battalion "Val Stura" (3 × companies), Alpini Battalion "Val Maira" (3 × companies), Alpini Battalion "Val Varaita" (3 × companies)
  - 8th Alpini Regiment (Alpini battalions operated independent of their regiments, which had only training functions)
    - Regular Alpini battalions: Alpini Battalion "Tolmezzo" (4 × companies), Alpini Battalion "Gemona" (4 × companies)
    - Territorial Militia Alpini battalions: Alpini Battalion "Val Tagliamento" (2 × companies), Alpini Battalion "Val Fella" (2 × companies)
  - VIII Coastal Battalion, XIX Coastal Battalion, and XX Coastal Battalion, Reale Guardia di Finanza
  - 1 × Squadron, Regiment "Cavalleggeri di Monferrato" (13th) (detached from I Cavalry Brigade, 1st Cavalry Division "Friuli", VI Army Corps)
  - Mountain Artillery Group "Conegliano", 2nd Mountain Artillery Regiment (4 × batteries (13th, 14th, 15th, and 55th) with 65/17 mod. 13 mountain guns)
  - 51st Battery, Mountain Artillery Group "Torino-Susa", 1st Mountain Artillery Regiment (with 65/17 mod. 13 mountain guns)
  - 52nd Battery, Mountain Artillery Group "Torino-Aosta", 1st Mountain Artillery Regiment (with 65/17 mod. 13 mountain guns)
  - 3rd and 15th Pack Batteries with 70/15 mountain guns
  - 6th and 21st Sappers Companies, 1st Engineer Regiment (Sappers)
  - 4th and 6th Miners Companies, 5th Engineer Regiment (Miners)
  - 19th Telegraphers Company, 3rd Engineer Regiment (Telegraphers)
  - Attached siege artillery:
    - 3rd Siege Park Section
      - 2nd and 3rd batteries with 149/35 A heavy guns
      - 1st and 2nd batteries with 280 A heavy howitzers (5th and 6th batteries arrived on 24 May at Stazione Carnia)
      - 3rd Battery with 280 C heavy howitzers (5th and 6th batteries arrived on 24 May at Stazione Carnia)
      - 1st Battery with 210/13 heavy howitzers (battery arrived on 24 May at Spilimbergo)
      - 3rd Battery with 305/17 heavy howitzers (battery arrived on 1 June)
      - 1st, 3rd, and 4th batteries with 210/8 heavy mortars (1st and 4th batteries arrived on 24 May at Spilimbergo, 3rd arrived on 29 May at Chiusaforte)
    - 4th Siege Park Section
      - 4th, and 5th batteries with 149/35 A heavy guns
      - 4th Battery with 305/17 heavy howitzers (battery arrived on 1 June)
      - 2nd, 5th, and 6th batteries with 210/8 heavy mortars (2nd Battery arrived on 24 May at Spilimbergo)

=== VIII Army Corps ===
- VIII Army Corps — Lieutenant General Ottavio Briccola
  - 16th Division — Major General Luciano Secco
    - Brigade "Cremona"
      - 21st Infantry Regiment (Battalions I-III; 12 × companies)
      - 22nd Infantry Regiment (Battalions I, III, IV; 12 × companies — the regiment's II Battalion (5th, 6th, 7th, and 8th companies) was deployed overseas and the regiment formed the IV Battalion (13th, 14th, 15th, and 16th companies) as replacement)
    - Brigade "Friuli"
      - 87th Infantry Regiment (Battalions I bis, II bis, III bis; 9 × companies — the regiment's I, II, and III battalions (1st to 12th companies) were deployed overseas and the regiment formed the I bis, II bis, and III bis battalions and 9 × companies (numbered 1st bis to 9th bis) as replacement)
      - 88th Infantry Regiment (Battalions I-III; 12 × companies)
    - 32nd Field Artillery Regiment (Groups I-III; 8 × batteries with 75/27 mod. 06 field guns) (regiment arrived on 29 May)
    - 8th Sappers Company, 2nd Engineer Regiment (Sappers)
  - 29th Division — Lieutenant General Fortunato Marazzi (Reserve division formed shortly before Italy's entry into the war)
    - Brigade "Perugia"
      - 129th Infantry Regiment (Battalions I-III; 12 × companies)
      - 130th Infantry Regiment (Battalions I-III; 12 × companies)
    - Brigade "Lazio"
      - 131st Infantry Regiment (Battalions I-III; 12 × companies)
      - 132nd Infantry Regiment (Battalions I-III; 12 × companies)
    - 37th Field Artillery Regiment (Groups I-II; 6 × batteries with 75/27 mod. 06 field guns) (regiment arrived on 31 May)
    - III Group (5th and 6th squadrons), Mobile Militia Cavalry (group arrived on 29 May)
    - IX Group (17th and 18th squadrons), Mobile Militia Cavalry (group arrived on 11 June)
    - Special Sappers Company, 2nd Engineer Regiment (Sappers)
  - Corps Troops
    - Regiment "Cavalleggeri di Umberto I" (23rd) (Groups I-II; 5 × squadrons) (regiment arrived on 9 June)
    - 7th Field Artillery Regiment (Groups I-III; 8 × batteries with 75/27 mod. 11 field guns) (regiment arrived on in early June)
    - II Cyclists Battalion, 2nd Bersaglieri Regiment (left Rome for the front on 30 May)
    - LIV Bersaglieri Battalion (Mobile Militia) (formed by the 2nd Bersaglieri Regiment)
    - 14th Telegraphers Company, 3rd Engineer Regiment (Telegraphers)

=== X Army Corps ===
- X Army Corps — Lieutenant General Domenico Grandi
  - 19th Division — Lieutenant General Giuseppe Ciancio
    - Brigade "Siena"
      - 31st Infantry Regiment (Battalions I-III; 12 × companies)
      - 32nd Infantry Regiment (Battalions I-III; 12 × companies)
    - Brigade "Bologna"
      - 39th Infantry Regiment (Battalions I-III; 12 × companies)
      - 40th Infantry Regiment (Battalions I, II, IV; 12 × companies — the regiment's III Battalion (9th, 10th, 11th, and 12th companies) was deployed overseas and the regiment formed the IV Battalion (13th, 14th, 15th, and 16th companies) as replacement)
    - 24th Field Artillery Regiment (Groups I-III; 8 × batteries with 75/27 mod. 06 field guns) (regiment arrived on 5–9 June)
    - 9th Sappers Company, 1st Engineer Regiment (Sappers)
  - 20th Division — Lieutenant General Eduardo Coardi di Carpenetto
    - Brigade "Savona"
      - 15th Infantry Regiment (Battalions I-III; 12 × companies)
      - 16th Infantry Regiment (Battalions II bis, IV, V; 9 × companies — the regiment's I, II, and III battalions (1st to 12th companies) were deployed overseas and the regiment formed the II bis, IV, and V battalions and 9 × companies (5th bis, 6th bis, 7th bis, 8th bis and the remainder numbered 13th to 17th) as replacement)
    - Brigade "Cagliari"
      - 63rd Infantry Regiment (Battalions I, II, IV; 12 × companies — the regiment's III Battalion (9th, 10th, 11th, and 12th companies) was deployed overseas and the regiment formed the IV Battalion (13th, 14th, 15th, and 16th companies) as replacement)
      - 64th Infantry Regiment (Battalions I-III; 12 × companies)
    - 34th Field Artillery Regiment (Groups I-III; 8 × batteries with 75/27 mod. 06 field guns) (regiment arrived on 5–6 June)
    - 10th Sappers Company, 1st Engineer Regiment (Sappers)
  - Corps Troops
    - Regiment "Cavalleggeri di Piacenza" (18th) (Groups I-II; 5 × squadrons) (regiment arrived on 6 June)
    - I Cyclists Battalion, 1st Bersaglieri Regiment (left Naples for the front on 5 June)
    - 12th Field Artillery Regiment (Groups I-III; 8 × batteries with 75/27 mod. 11 field guns) (regiment arrived on 6–9 June)
    - 15th Telegraphers Company, 3rd Engineer Regiment (Telegraphers)

=== XIII Army Corps ===
- XIII Army Corps — Lieutenant General Gaetano Zoppi (Reserve army corps formed shortly before Italy's entry into the war)
  - 25th Division — Major General Luigi Capello (Reserve division formed shortly before Italy's entry into the war)
    - Brigade "Macerata"
      - 121st Infantry Regiment (Battalions I-III; 12 × companies)
      - 122nd Infantry Regiment (Battalions I-III; 12 × companies)
    - Brigade "Sassari"
      - 151st Infantry Regiment (Battalions I-III; 12 × companies)
      - 152nd Infantry Regiment (Battalions I-III; 12 × companies)
    - 46th Field Artillery Regiment (Groups I-III; 8 × batteries with 75/27 mod. 06 field guns)
    - X Group (19th and 20th squadrons), Mobile Militia Cavalry (group arrived on 3 June)
    - 15th Sappers Company, 2nd Engineer Regiment (Sappers)
  - 30th Division — Lieutenant General Arcangelo Scotti (Reserve division formed shortly before Italy's entry into the war)
    - Brigade "Piacenza"
      - 111th Infantry Regiment (Battalions I-III; 12 × companies)
      - 112th Infantry Regiment (Battalions I-III; 12 × companies)
    - Brigade "Alessandria"
      - 155th Infantry Regiment (Battalions I-III; 12 × companies)
      - 156th Infantry Regiment (Battalions I-III; 12 × companies)
    - 39th Field Artillery Regiment (Groups I-II; 6 × batteries with 75/27 mod. 06 field guns) (regiment arrived on 13 June)
    - VI Group (11th and 12th squadrons), Mobile Militia Cavalry (group arrived on 1 June)
    - 18th Sappers Company, 1st Engineer Regiment (Sappers)
  - 31st Division — Lieutenant General Annibale Gastaldello (Reserve division formed shortly before Italy's entry into the war)
    - Brigade "Chieti"
      - 123rd Infantry Regiment (Battalions I-III; 12 × companies)
      - 124th Infantry Regiment (Battalions I-III; 12 × companies)
    - Brigade "Barletta"
      - 137th Infantry Regiment (Battalions I-III; 12 × companies)
      - 138th Infantry Regiment (Battalions I-III; 12 × companies)
    - 43rd Field Artillery Regiment (Groups I-II; 6 × batteries with 75/27 mod. 06 field guns) (regiment arrived on 2 June)
    - 1 × Group, 25th Field Artillery Regiment (3 × batteries with 75/27 mod. 06 field guns — detached from 1st Division, I Army Corps) (group arrived on 1 June)
    - VIII Group (15th and 16th squadrons), Mobile Militia Cavalry (group arrived on 12 June)
    - 13th Sappers Company, 1st Engineer Regiment (Sappers)
  - Corps Troops
    - Regiment "Piemonte Reale Cavalleria" (2nd) (Groups I-II, 5 × squadrons — I Group with 1st and 2nd Squadrons detached to XIV Army Corps) (regiment arrived on 5 June)
    - XLIX Bersaglieri Battalion (Mobile Militia) (formed by the 6th Bersaglieri Regiment)
    - L Bersaglieri Battalion (Mobile Militia) (formed by the 6th Bersaglieri Regiment)
    - LI Bersaglieri Battalion (Mobile Militia) (formed by the 3rd Bersaglieri Regiment)
    - 44th Field Artillery Regiment (Groups I-II; 6 × batteries with 75/27 mod. 06 field guns) (regiment arrived on 8–9 June)
    - 3rd Pontieri Company, 4th Engineer Regiment (Pontieri)
    - 18th Telegraphers Company, 3rd Engineer Regiment (Telegraphers)

=== XIV Army Corps ===
- XIV Army Corps — Lieutenant General Paolo Morrone (Reserve army corps formed shortly before Italy's entry into the war)
  - 26th Division — Lieutenant General Michele Salazar (Reserve division formed shortly before Italy's entry into the war)
    - Brigade "Catania"
      - 145th Infantry Regiment (Battalions I-III; 12 × companies)
      - 146th Infantry Regiment (Battalions I-III; 12 × companies)
    - Brigade "Caltanissetta"
      - 147th Infantry Regiment (Battalions I-III; 12 × companies)
      - 148th Infantry Regiment (Battalions I-III; 12 × companies)
    - 49th Field Artillery Regiment (Groups I-II; 5 × batteries with 75/27 mod. 06 field guns) (regiment arrived on 12 June)
    - 4th Squadron, Regiment "Cavalleggeri di Palermo" (30th) (former 6th Squadron, Regiment "Cavalleggeri di Lucca" (16th))
    - 19th Sappers Company, 2nd Engineer Regiment (Sappers)
  - 27th Division — Lieutenant General Guglielmo Pecori Giraldi (Reserve division formed shortly before Italy's entry into the war)
    - Brigade "Benevento"
      - 133rd Infantry Regiment (Battalions I-III; 12 × companies)
      - 134th Infantry Regiment (Battalions I-III; 12 × companies)
    - Brigade "Campania"
      - 135th Infantry Regiment (Battalions I-III; 12 × companies)
      - 136th Infantry Regiment (Battalions I-III; 12 × companies)
    - 38th Field Artillery Regiment (Groups I-II; 6 × batteries with 75/27 mod. 06 field guns) (regiment arrived on 8 June)
    - 20th Sappers Company, 2nd Engineer Regiment (Sappers)
  - 28th Division — Lieutenant General Giuseppe Queirolo (Reserve division formed shortly before Italy's entry into the war)
    - Brigade "Bari"
      - 139th Infantry Regiment (Battalions I-III; 12 × companies)
      - 140th Infantry Regiment (Battalions I-III; 12 × companies)
    - Brigade "Catanzaro"
      - 141st Infantry Regiment (Battalions I-III; 12 × companies)
      - 142nd Infantry Regiment (Battalions I-III; 12 × companies)
    - 45th Field Artillery Regiment (Groups I-II; 6 × batteries with 75/27 mod. 06 field guns) (regiment arrived on 9–12 June)
    - VII Group (13th and 14th squadrons), Mobile Militia Cavalry (group arrived on 13 June)
    - 21st Sappers Company, 2nd Engineer Regiment (Sappers)
  - Corps Troops
    - I Group, Regiment "Piemonte Reale Cavalleria" (2nd) (2 × squadrons (1st and 2nd) — detached from XIII Army Corps) (regiment arrived on 5 June)
    - LVI Bersaglieri Battalion (Mobile Militia) (formed by the 12th Bersaglieri Regiment)
    - 47th Field Artillery Regiment (Groups I-II; 5 × batteries with 75/27 mod. 06 field guns — 3rd Battery arrived on 15 October 1915)
    - 1 × Group, 19th Field Artillery Regiment (2 × batteries with 75/27 mod. 06 field guns — detached from 15th Division, V Army Corps)
    - 1 × Group, 27th Field Artillery Regiment (3 × batteries with 75/27 mod. 06 field guns) — detached from 5th Division, III Army Corps)
    - 2nd and 9th Pontieri Companies, 4th Engineer Regiment (Pontieri)
    - 23rd Telegraphers Company, 3rd Engineer Regiment (Telegraphers)

=== 3rd Cavalry Division "Lombardia" ===
- 3rd Cavalry Division "Lombardia" — Lieutenant General Carlo Guicciardi di Cervarolo
  - V Cavalry Brigade
    - Regiment "Cavalleggeri di Saluzzo" (12th) (Groups I-II; 5 × squadrons) (regiment arrived on 7 June)
    - Regiment "Cavalleggeri di Vicenza" (24th) (Groups I-II; 5 × squadrons)
  - VI Cavalry Brigade
    - Regiment "Savoia Cavalleria" (3rd) (Groups I-II; 5 × squadrons) (regiment arrived on 6 June)
    - Regiment "Lancieri di Montebello" (8th) (Groups I-II; 5 × squadrons) (regiment arrived on 3 June)
  - III Group, Horse Artillery Regiment (2 × batteries (5th and 6th) with 75/27 mod. 12 guns) (group arrived on 29 May at Ponte di Piave)

=== 4th Cavalry Division "Piemonte" ===
- 4th Cavalry Division "Piemonte" — Lieutenant General Alessandro Malingri di Bagnolo
  - VII Cavalry Brigade
    - Regiment "Nizza Cavalleria" (1st) (Groups I-II; 5 × squadrons) (regiment arrived on 5 June)
    - Regiment "Lancieri di Vercelli" (26th) (Groups I-II; 5 × squadrons) (regiment arrived on 5 June)
  - VIII Cavalry Brigade
    - Regiment "Cavalleggeri Guide" (19th) (5 × squadrons (regiment arrived on 8 June)
    - Regiment "Cavalleggeri di Treviso" (28th) (Groups I-II; 5 × squadrons) (regiment arrived on 7 June)
  - IV Cyclists Battalion, 4th Bersaglieri Regiment (left Turin for the front on 3 June)
  - IV Group, Horse Artillery Regiment (2 × batteries (7th and 8th) with 75/27 mod. 12 guns) (left Milan for Portogruaro on 4 June)

== Sources ==
- Nicolle, David (2003). The Italian Army of World War I. Osprey Publishing. ISBN 1-84176-398-5.
- Page, Thomas Nelson (1920). Italy and the World War. New York, Charles Scribner's Sons, Full Text Available Online.
- Thompson, Mark (2008). The White War: Life and Death on the Italian Front, 1915–1919. London: Faber and Faber. ISBN 978-0-465-01329-6.
