= Cannone da 149/23 =

Italian siege gun of WW1

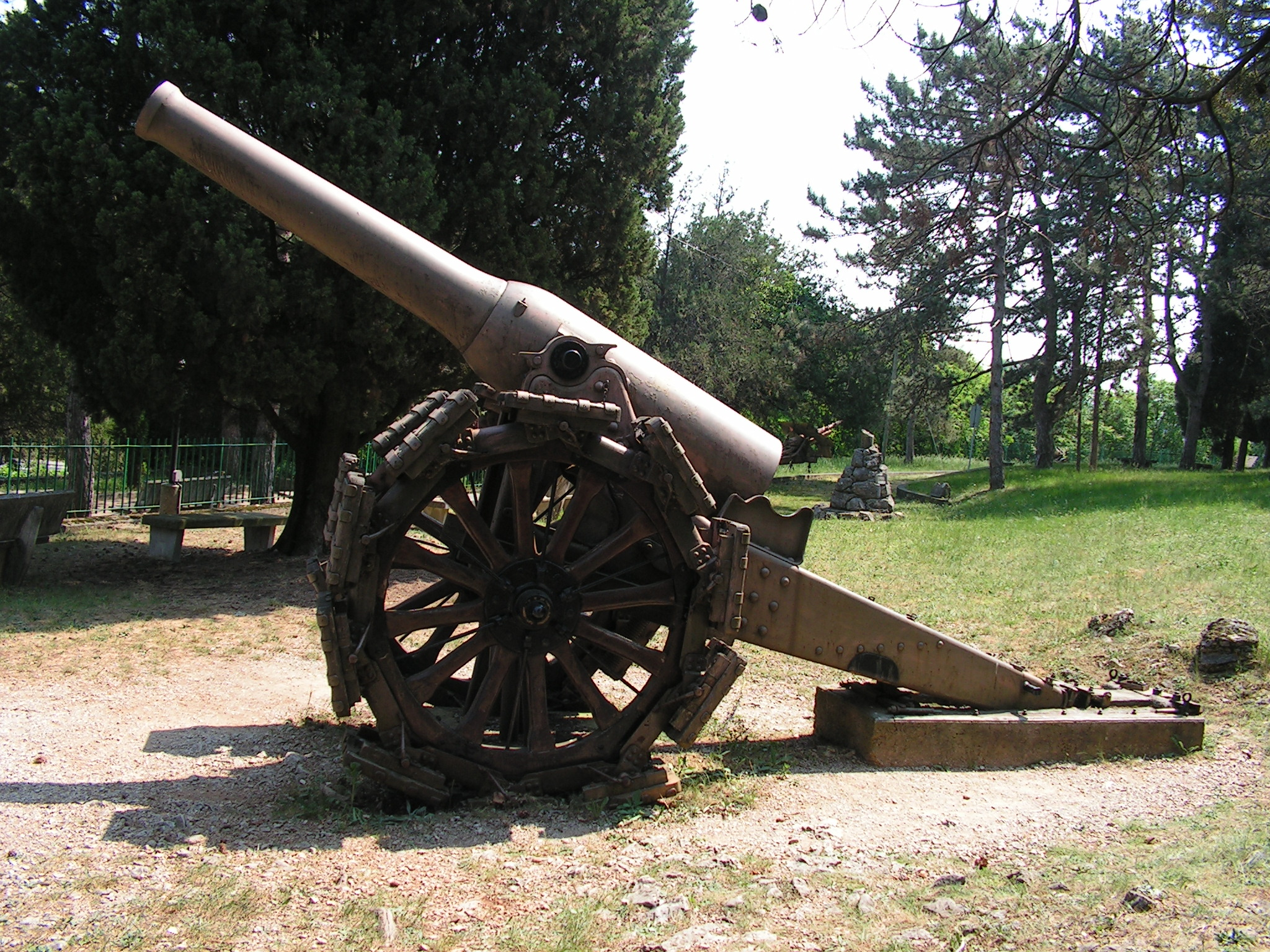
- A cannone da 149/23 at Redipuglia
- Type: Fortress Gun; Siege Gun; Field Artillery
- Place of origin: Kingdom of Italy

Service history
- In service: 1882−1918
- Used by: Kingdom of Italy; Austria-Hungary
- Wars: Italo-Turkish War; World War I

Production history
- Designer: Ansaldo
- Designed: 1877
- Manufacturer: Ansaldo
- Produced: 1882
- Variants: Coastal Artillery

Specifications
- Mass: 5,180 kg (11,420 lb)
- Barrel length: 3.42 m (11 ft 3 in) L/23
- Shell: Separate-loading, bagged charges and projectiles
- Shell weight: 30.4 kg (67 lb)
- Caliber: 149.1 mm (5.87 in)
- Recoil: None
- Carriage: Box trail
- Elevation: -10° to +35°
- Traverse: None
- Rate of fire: 1 rpm
- Muzzle velocity: 520 m/s (1,700 ft/s)
- Maximum firing range: 9 km (5.6 mi)

The Cannone da 149 G later known as the Cannone da 149/23 was an Italian fortress gun and siege gun which served with Italy during the Italo-Turkish War and World War I. Captured guns may have been used by Austria-Hungary.

== History ==
The 149/23 was designed and built by Gio. Ansaldo & C. and entered service in 1882. It was fairly conventional for its time and most nations had similar guns such as the de Bange 155 mm cannon. However, by the time the First World War broke out, it was obsolescent and in need of replacement. Although the majority of combatants had heavy field artillery prior to the outbreak of the First World War, none had adequate numbers of heavy guns in service, nor had they foreseen the growing importance of heavy artillery once the Italian Front stagnated and trench warfare set in. Since aircraft of the period were not yet capable of carrying large diameter bombs the burden of delivering heavy firepower fell on the artillery. The majority of combatants scrambled to find anything that could fire a heavy shell and that meant emptying the fortresses and designing field carriages for converted coastal and naval artillery.

== Design ==
The 149/23 was a short barreled breech-loading cannon on a rigid two-wheeled box trail carriage. The barrel was a typical built-up gun of the period with a mix of steel and iron construction. The gun had an interrupted screw breech and it fired separate-loading, bagged charges and projectiles.

Like many of its contemporaries, the 149/23 carriage was tall and narrow with two wooden 12-spoke wheels of 1.5 m (4 ft 11 in) diameter. This was because the guns were designed to sit behind a parapet with the barrel overhanging the front. Since the guns weren't expected to go very far they weren't designed with mobility in mind. Like many of its contemporaries, its carriage did not have a recoil mechanism. However, when used in a fortress the guns could be connected to an external recoil mechanism which connected to a steel eye on the concrete firing platform and a hook on the carriage between the wheels. A set of wooden ramps were also placed behind the wheels and when the gun fired the wheels rolled up the ramp and was returned to position by gravity. There was also no traversing mechanism and the gun had to be levered into position to aim. A drawback of this system was the gun had to be re-aimed each time which lowered the rate of fire.

To facilitate towing on soft ground and lessen recoil the wheels were often fitted with Bonagente grousers patented by the Italian major Crispino Bonagente. These consisted of twelve rectangular plates connected with elastic links and are visible in many photographs of World War I artillery from all of the combatants. The combination of Bonagente grousers and ramps were usually enough to handle recoil for field use. For towing the tail of the gun hooked onto a limber for towing by a horse team or artillery tractor.

== Coastal Artillery ==
In addition to its siege role, the 149/23 was deployed in the coastal artillery role. In this role, the guns were mounted in 140 mm (5.5 in) thick dome shaped steel gun turrets that were set in concrete fortifications. There was also a version on an unprotected garrison mount with limited traverse. The recoil system for this version consisted of a U-shaped gun cradle which held the trunnioned barrel and a slightly inclined firing platform with a hydro-gravity recoil system. When the gun fired the hydraulic buffers slowed the recoil of the cradle which slid up a set of inclined rails on the firing platform and then returned the gun to position by the combined action of the buffers and gravity.

== The Cannon of Adamello ==
The Cannon of Adamello is a 149/23 that can still be visited on the Cresta Croce, in the Adamello Range, where it had been brought to support operations in the mountains. The cannon arrived in Temù from the Edolo railway station on February 9, 1916, and was transported by road to Malga Caldea at an altitude of 1,580 m (5,180 ft). From there it was broken down into two large sled loads which were towed by 200 artillerymen and engineers up to Rifugio Giuseppe Garibaldi at an altitude of 2,535 m (8,317 ft) on 17 April. Finally, on 27 April the gun reached the Passo del Venerocolo. On the night of 6 June 1917, the gun was transferred to Cresta Croce at 3,276 m (10,748 ft) and on 15 June began to bombard the positions of the Kaiserjäger of Lieutenant Felix Hecht von Eleda on the Corno di Cavento. The gun was called "l'ippopotamo' ("the hippopotamus") by its crew, as it was as totally out of its intended environment as they themselves.

== Photo Gallery ==
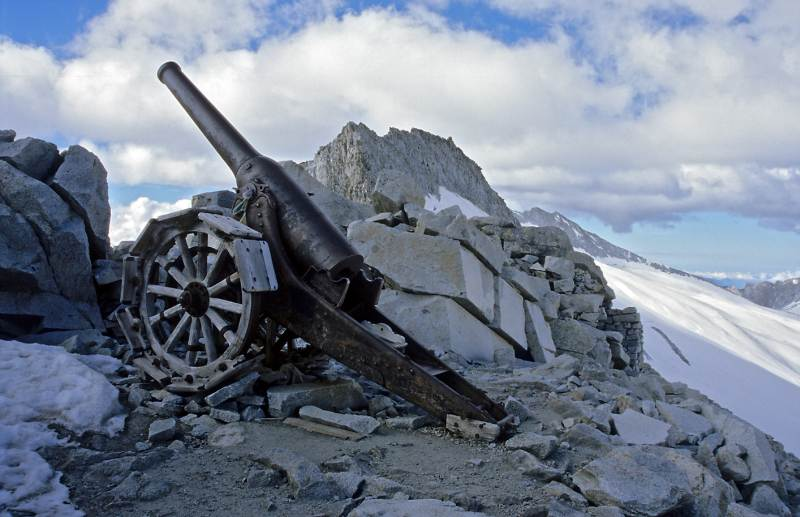
The Cannon of Adamello.

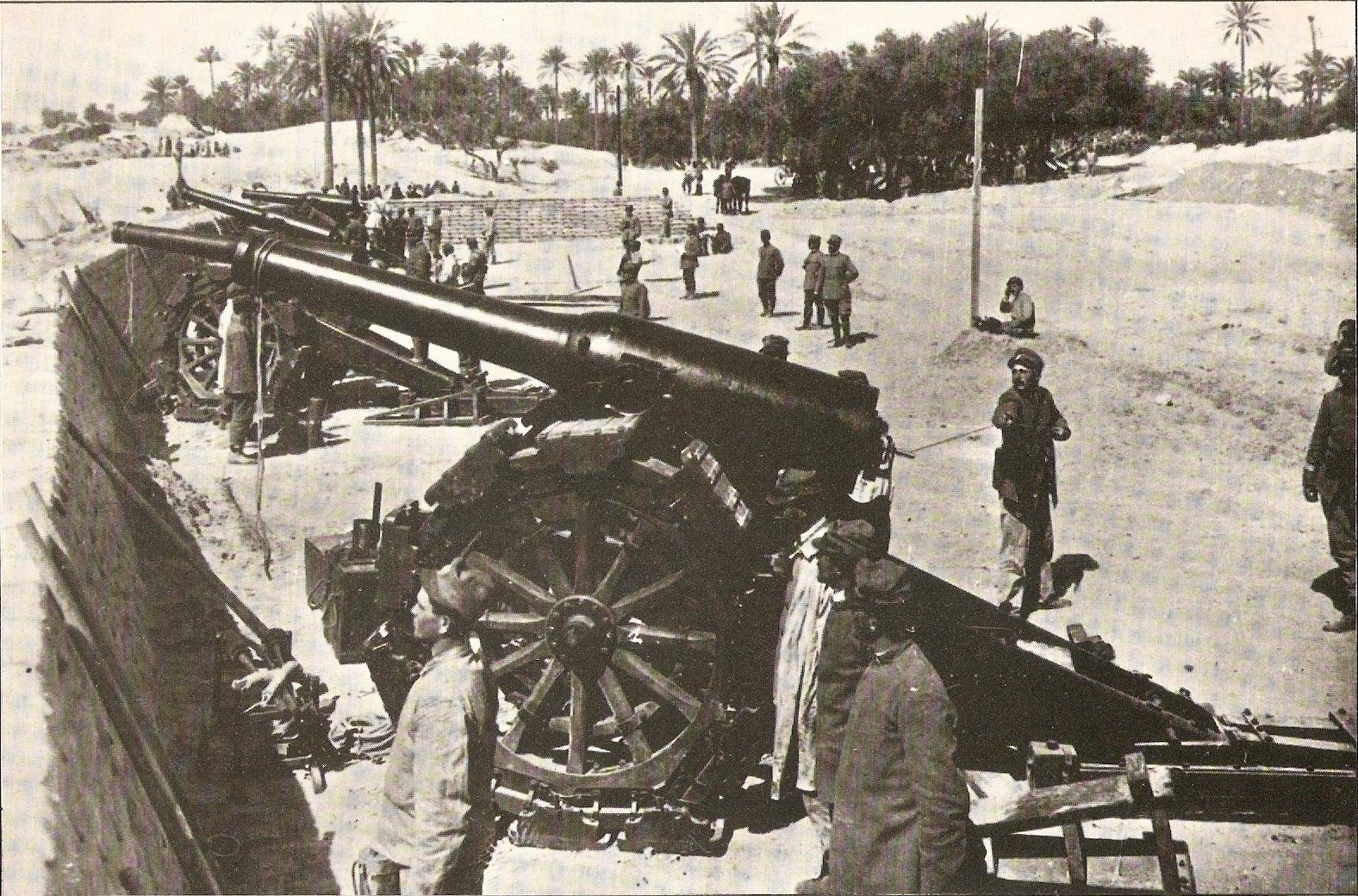
A battery near Tripoli.

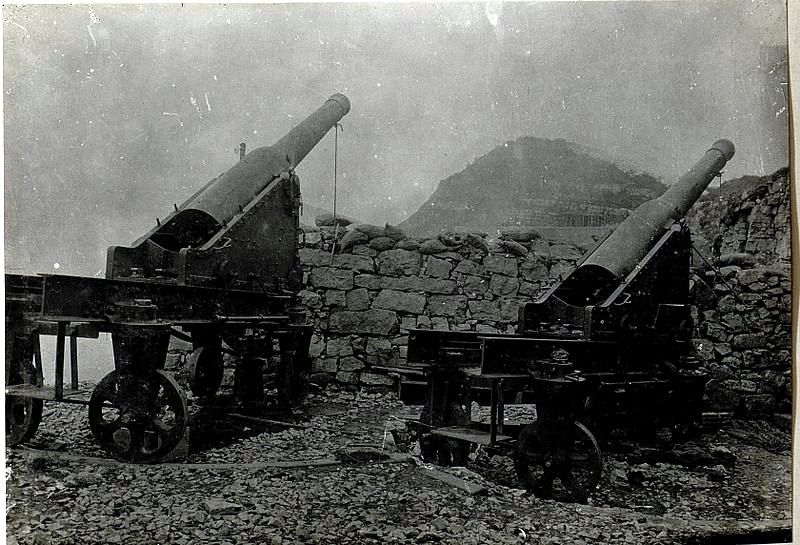
149/23's on a garrison mount.

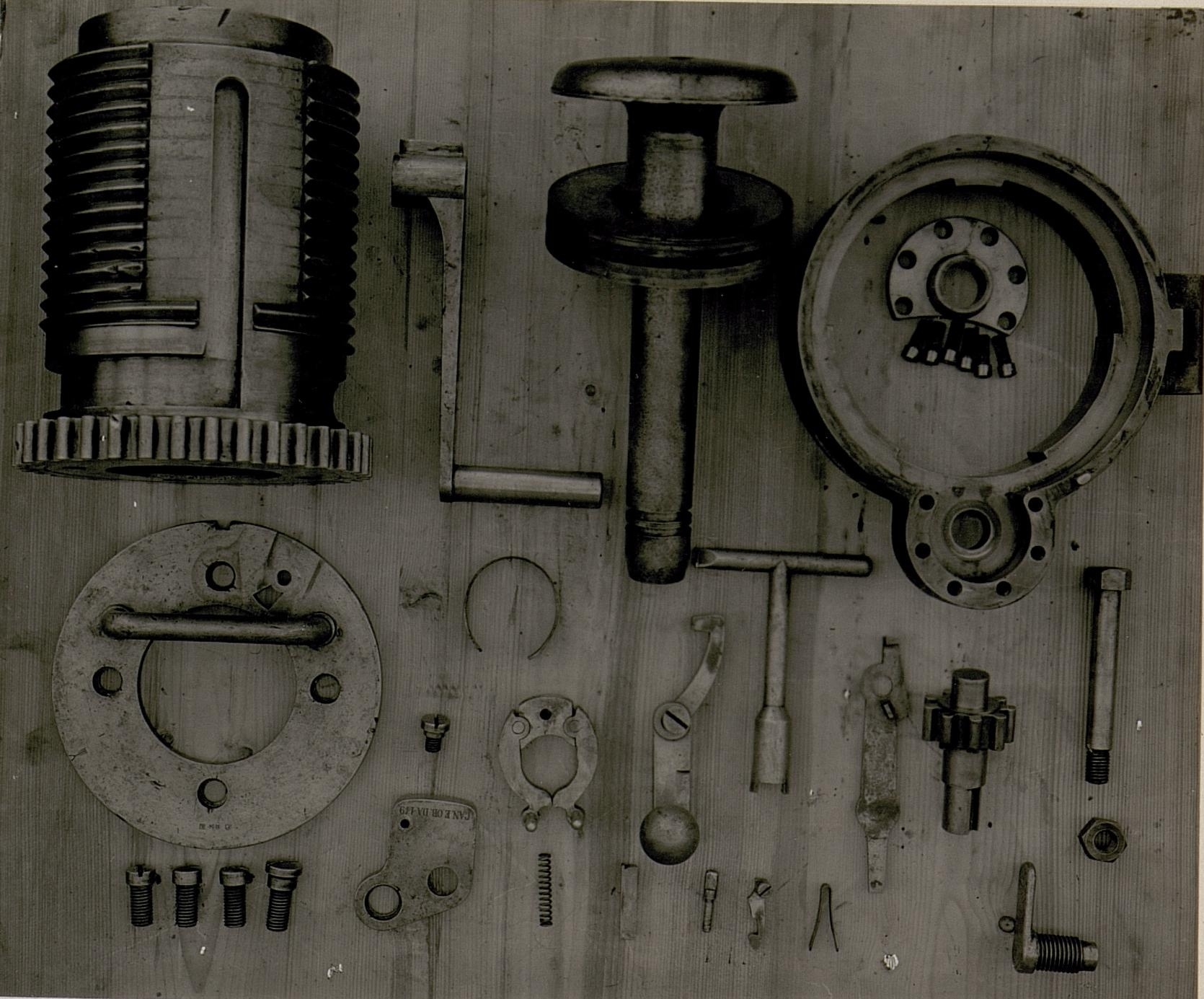
A disassembled breech mechanism.

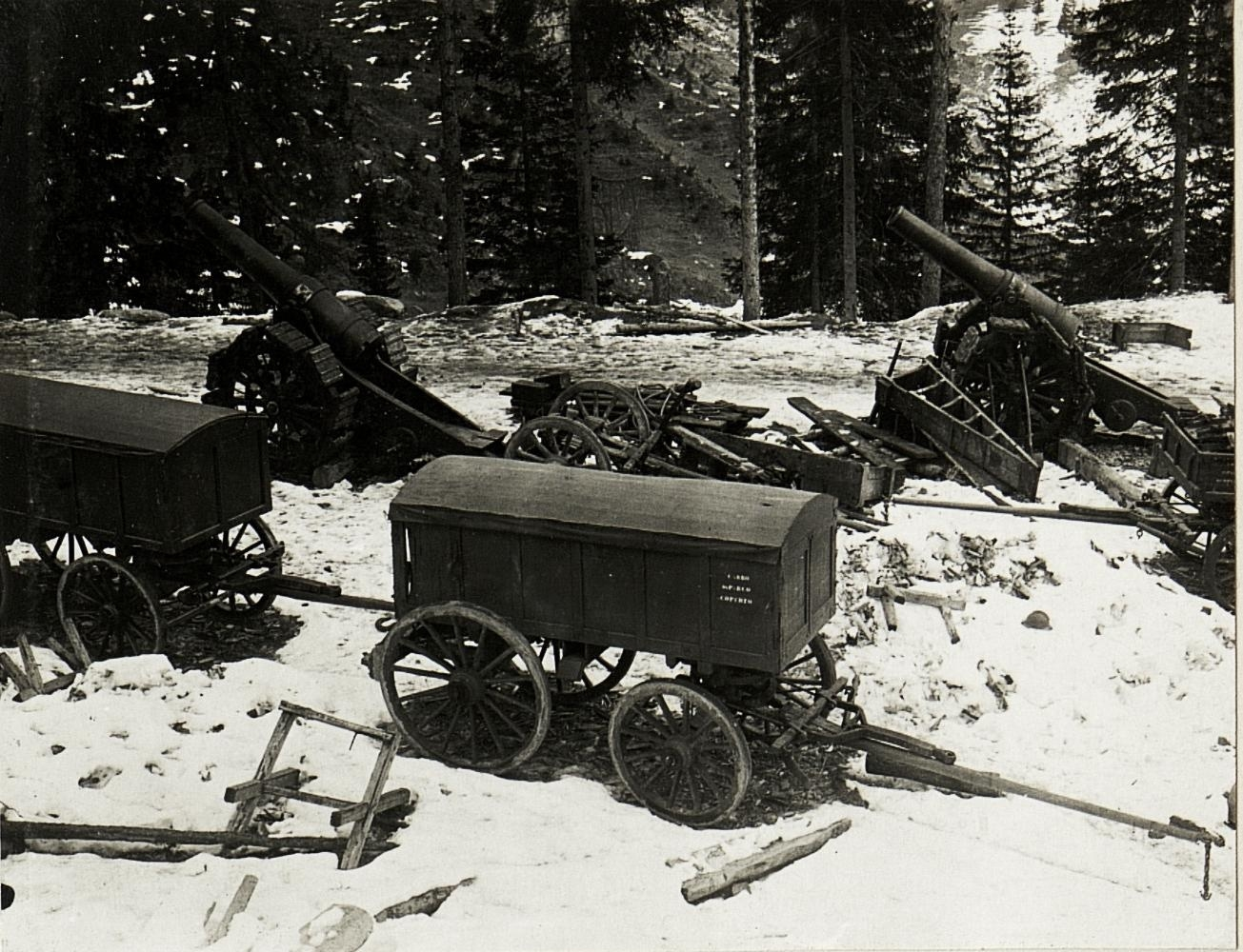
The Austrians and Germans captured many 149/23's during the Battle of Caporetto.

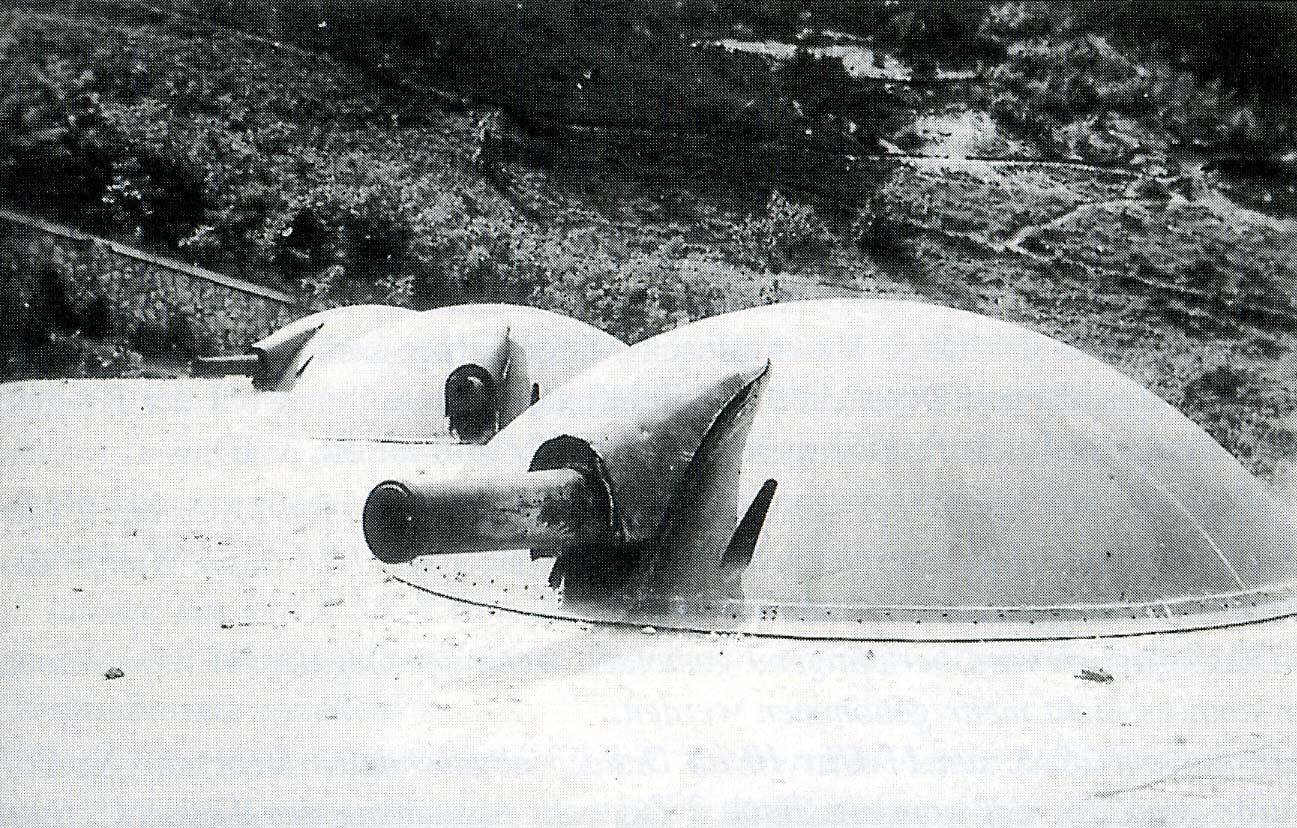
149/23 cannons in armored turrets at Forte Casa Ratti.
