= Cannone da 70/15 =

Cannone da 70 A Mont. Cannone da 70/15
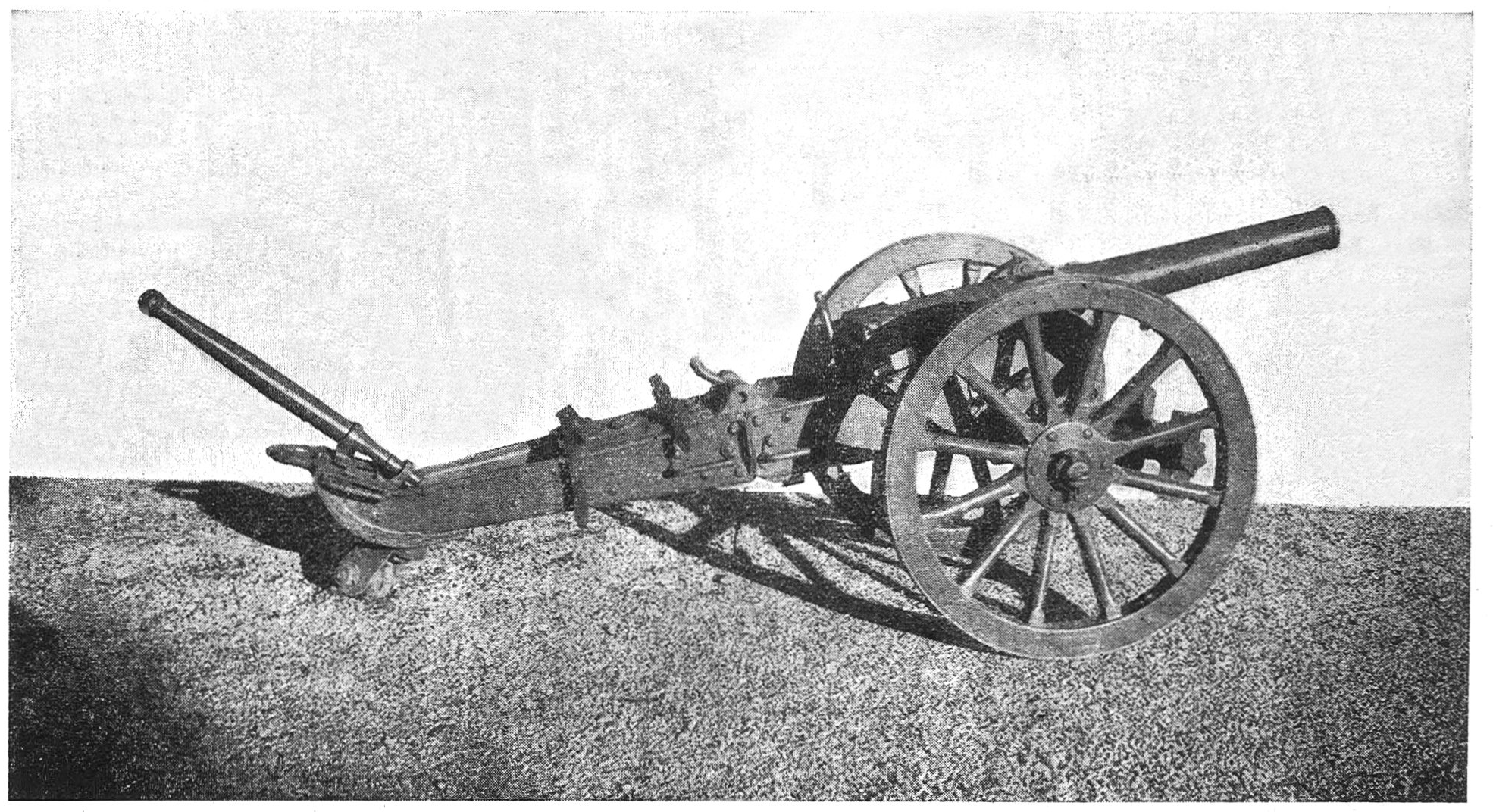
- Right view of a Cannone da 70/15.
- Type: Mountain gun
- Place of origin: Kingdom of Italy

Service history
- In service: 1903–1943
- Used by: Italy
- Wars: Italo-Turkish War; World War I Second Italo-Ethiopian War; World War II

Production history
- Designer: Captain Regazzi
- Designed: 1902
- Manufacturer: Ansaldo; Armstrong-Pozzuoli; ARET
- Produced: 1902–1918

Specifications
- Mass: 387 kg (853 lb)
- Barrel length: 1.15 m (3 ft 9 in) L/16.4
- Shell: 70 x 86 mm R
- Shell weight: 4.84 kg (10 lb 11 oz)
- Caliber: 70 mm (2.8 in)
- Breech: Interrupted screw
- Recoil: None
- Carriage: Box trail
- Elevation: -12° to 21°
- Traverse: 0°
- Rate of fire: 8 rpm
- Muzzle velocity: 353 m/s (1,158 ft/s)
- Maximum firing range: 6.6 km (4.1 mi)

The Cannone da 70 A Mont., in 1926 officially renamed Cannone da 70/15 was a mountain gun used by Italy during World War I. By World War II it had been relegated to the infantry gun role in units assigned to Italian East Africa.

== Background ==
The 70/15 was designed in 1902 by Italian artillery Captain Regazzi to replace the Canonne da 7 BR Ret. Mont. that was first introduced in 1881. The 70/15 was technically obsolescent when it went into service in 1904 but it took the Italians almost a decade to field its replacement the Cannone da 65/17 modello 08/13.

== Design ==
The 70/15 was a breech-loaded mountain gun with an interrupted screw breech, a box trail carriage, two wooden-spoked steel-rimmed wheels. There was no recoil mechanism, no gun shield, no traversing mechanism, and elevation was controlled by a jackscrew beneath the breech. It could be broken down into four mule loads for transport or hooked to a limber for towing.

== History ==
The 70/15 was first used during the Italo-Turkish War by the 3rd Mountain Artillery Regiment. The 70/15 was still in service during World War One due to insufficient numbers of more modern replacements. Due to its light, simple, inexpensive, and rugged construction Ansaldo built 710 70/15s barrels from 1916 to 1918, while Armstrong Pozzuoli and other state arsenals built the gun carriages. It remained in colonial service throughout World War II. It was gradually phased out of the mountain role and given a new role as an infantry support gun.

After World War One most were transferred to the Italian Border Guard. At the outbreak of World War Two, 92 guns were still in service with the I Group/1° GaF Artillery, the VII Group/2° GaF Artillery, and IIbis Group/3° GaF Artillery in Albania. In Italian East Africa, the 70/15 was used by the XCI Colonial Artillery Group/XCI Colonial Brigade, the XCII Colonial Artillery Group/XCII Colonial Brigade, and the CI Colonial Artillery Group.

== Photo Gallery ==
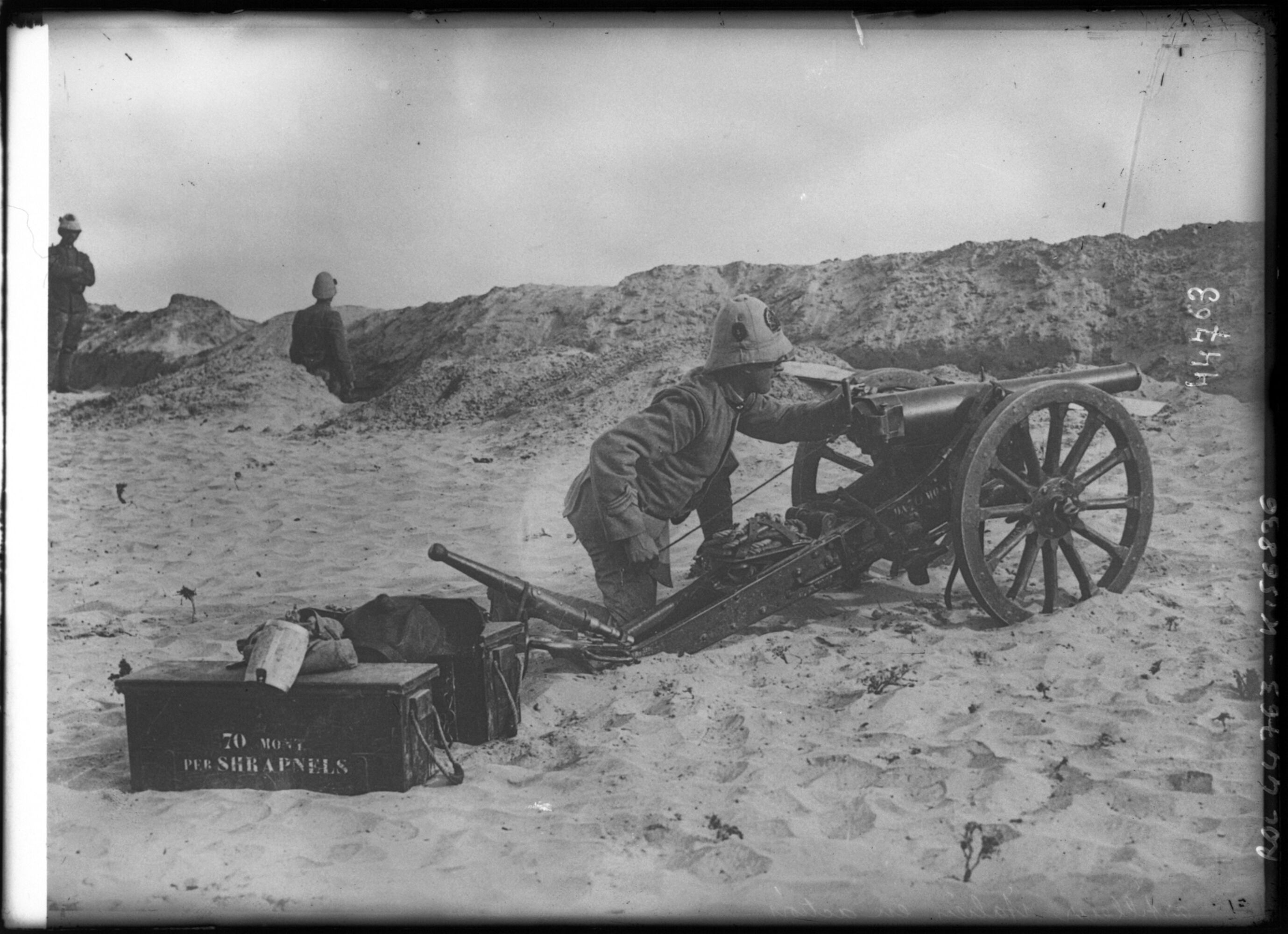
Italian artilleryman with a 70/15.

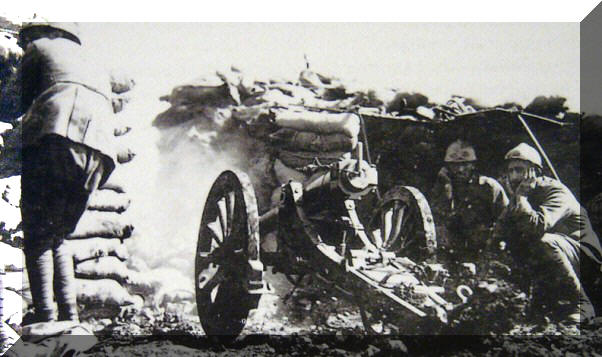
Cannone da 70/15 in action.

== Sources ==
- Comando Supremo (1917). Dati tecnici sommari sulle Artiglierie in servizio. Roma.
- Ministero della Guerra (1938). Dati tecnici sulle Artiglierie in servizio. Roma.
- Castronovo, Valerio (1997). Storia dell'Ansaldo Vol. 4 - L'Ansaldo e la Grande Guerra, 1915-1918. Roma: Laterza.
- Cappellano, Filippo (1999). "La Vickers-Terni e la produzione di artiglierie in Italia nella prima guerra mondiale". Società Italiana di Storia Militare - Quaderno 1999 Magazine.
