= Obice da 280 =

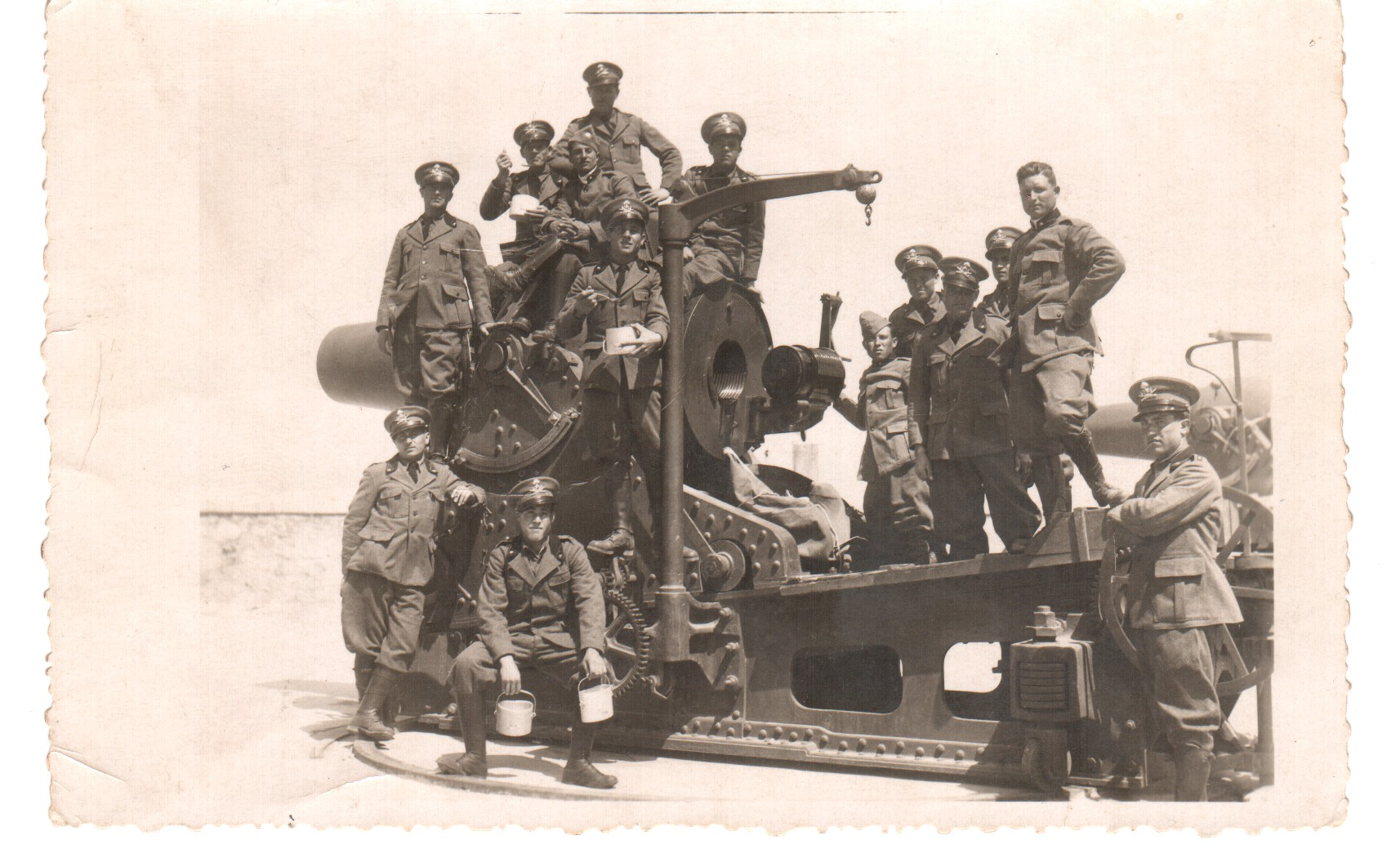
- An Obice da 280 on Rhodes in 1943.
- Type: Coastal artillery Siege howitzer
- Place of origin: Kingdom of Italy

Service history
- In service: 1890−1945
- Used by: Kingdom of Italy
- Wars: World War I World War II

Production history
- Designer: Armstrong
- Designed: 1884
- Manufacturer: Ansaldo
- Produced: 1890
- No. built: ?
- Variants: 280/10; 280/11; 280/16

Specifications
- Mass: Barrel: 17.9 tonnes (17.6 long tons; 19.7 short tons); Carriage: 16.17 tonnes (15.91 long tons; 17.82 short tons)
- Barrel length: 2.86 m (9 ft 5 in) L/9
- Shell: Separate loading bagged charge and projectile
- Shell weight: 199–235 kg (439–518 lb)
- Caliber: 280 mm (11 in)
- Breech: Interrupted screw
- Recoil: Hydro-gravity
- Carriage: Box trail
- Elevation: +6° to +75°
- Traverse: 360°
- Muzzle velocity: 460 m/s (1,500 ft/s)
- Maximum firing range: 11.6 km (7.2 mi)

The Obice da 280 was an Italian coastal defense and siege howitzer designed in 1884 by the British Armstrong firm and produced under license by the Ansaldo company during the late 1800s. It was used during both the First and Second World Wars.

== History ==
After the independence and unification of Italy, the Italians were not self-sufficient in arms design and production. Foreign firms such as Armstrong, Krupp, Schneider, and Vickers all provided arms and helped establish local production of their designs under license.

In addition to Italy, the design was also produced under license in Japan. Major Pompeo Grillo, a heavy artillery specialist was hired in April 1884 to help the construction of a new artillery plant in Osaka. The description from Brassey's Naval Annual of 1892 reads "The howitzer was a 28-cm rifled breech-loader of cast iron, 9 calibers long made at Osaka, from the designs of guns made for the Italians by Sir W.G. Armstrong". The Japanese version played an important role in the destruction of the fortifications and sinking the Russian fleet during the Siege of Port Arthur in the Russo-Japanese War.

== Design ==
In the coastal artillery role, the Obice da 280 was intended to pierce the thin decks of armored warships with high angle plunging fire, rather than piercing their armored belt. The Obice da 280 was a typical built-up gun of the period with an inner cast iron barrel reinforced with multiple layers of steel hoops. Starting in 1890 the Italians produced the design in a number of different lengths and they were designated by their diameter and length in calibers 280/9, 280/10, 280/11, and 280/16. The Obice da 280 was a breech loaded design with an interrupted screw breech, and used separate loading bagged charges and projectiles.

In the Coastal Defense role, the Obice da 280 was mounted on a rectangular carriage which consisted of a large diameter geared steel ring set into a concrete slab behind a parapet. The mounts allowed high angles of elevation with 360° of traverse. The mount pivoted in the middle and was traversed by a worm gear which attached to the base. The recoil system for the consisted of a U-shaped gun cradle which held the trunnioned barrel and a slightly inclined firing platform with hydraulic buffers. When the gun fired the hydraulic buffer slowed the recoil of the cradle which slid up a set of inclined rails on the firing platform and then returned to position by the combined action of the buffers and gravity.

== World War I ==
In 1908 the Italian coastal artillery analyzed reports from the Russo-Japanese War of the performance of the Japanese guns and found them unsatisfactory. This led to the adoption of two new guns to replace the Obice da 280, the Obice da 305/17 and the Mortaio da 260/9 Modello 16. However, neither fully replaced the Obice da 280 and a number were still on hand when Italy joined the war in 1915.

Although the majority of combatants had heavy field artillery prior to the outbreak of the First World War, none had adequate numbers of heavy guns in service, nor had they foreseen the growing importance of heavy artillery once the Italian Front stagnated and trench warfare set in. Two sources of heavy artillery suitable for conversion to field use were coastal fortifications and surplus naval guns. Suitable field and rail carriages were built for these guns in an effort to give their forces the heavy field artillery needed to overcome trenches and hardened concrete fortifications.

At the outbreak of the First World War, it is estimated there were 22 Obice da 280's deployed in coastal batteries. 12 guns were deployed near Spartà and 10 were deployed near Calabria guarding the straights of Messina. For transport, the Obice da 280 could be broken down into multiple wagon loads for towing to the front by artillery tractors and then reassembled onsite on using cranes and winches. Many were removed from their coastal fortifications and were deployed on the Isonzo front in 1917 and were captured by the Austrians in the Battle of Caporetto. What use the Austrians made of the captured guns is unknown?

== World War II ==
An unknown number survived until the Second World War and were once again deployed in coastal fortifications.

== Ammunition ==
- Common - Cast iron body filled with black powder, 235 kg (518 lb).
- High-Explosive - Steel shell loaded with TNT, 218 kg (481 lb).
- Semi-Armor Piercing - Hardened steel shell loaded with TNT, 199 kg (439 lb).

== Weapons of comparable performance, role and era ==
- 28 cm Haubitze L/12 - A German coastal defense howitzer.
- Mortier de 270 mm modèle 1889 - A French coastal defense mortar.

== Photo Gallery ==
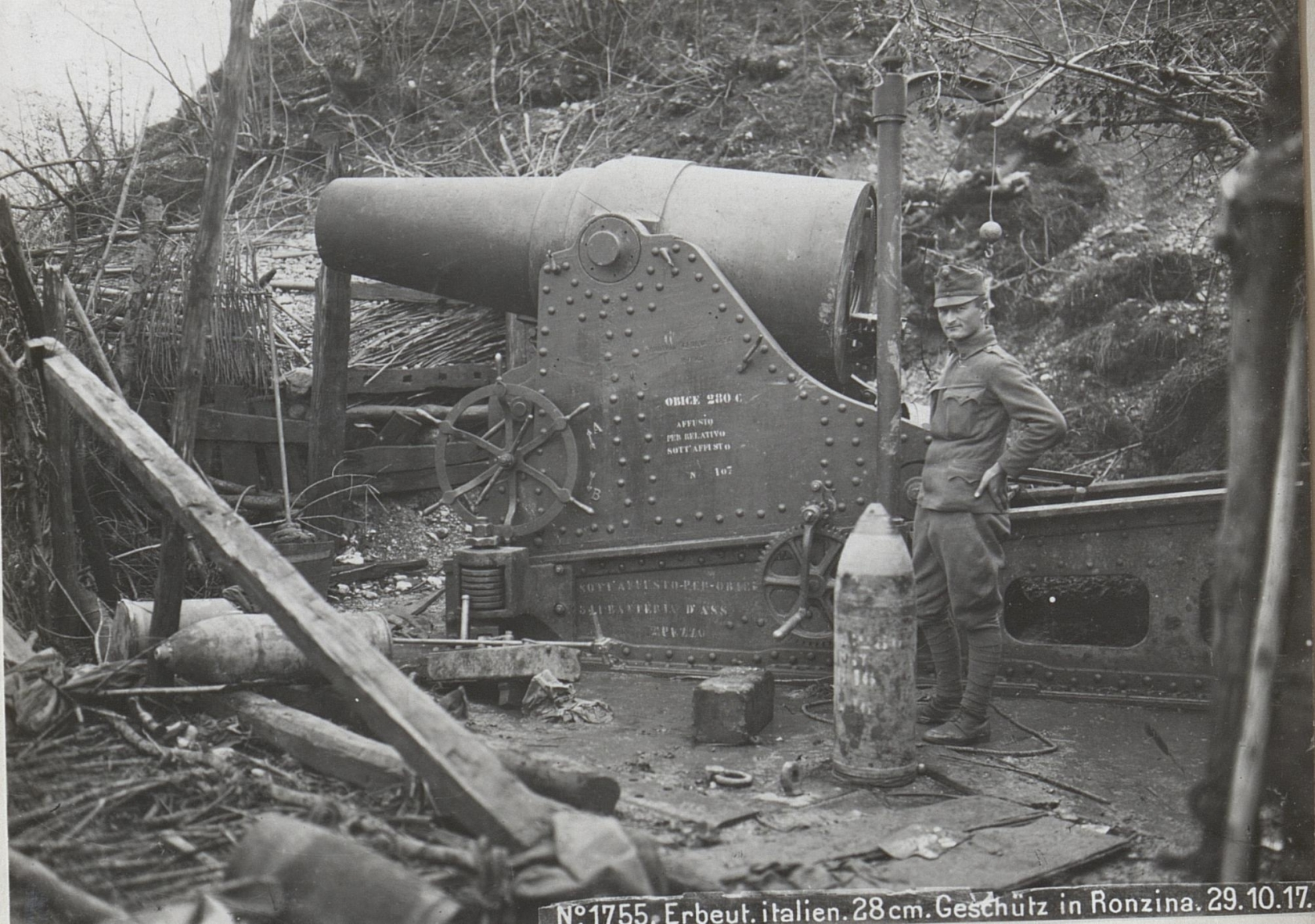
A Obice da 280 captured by the Austrians.

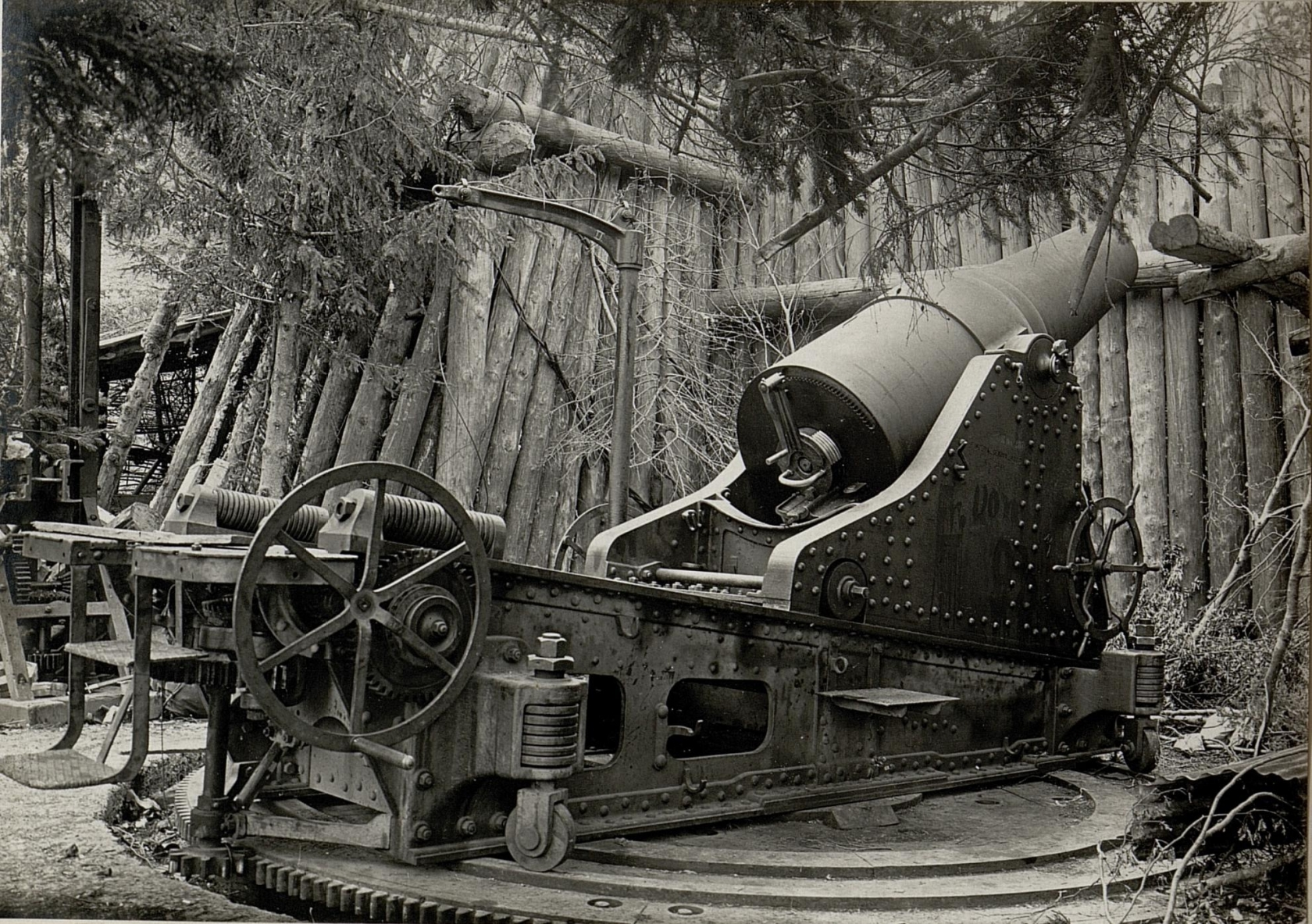
A good detail photo showing the breech and carriage details.

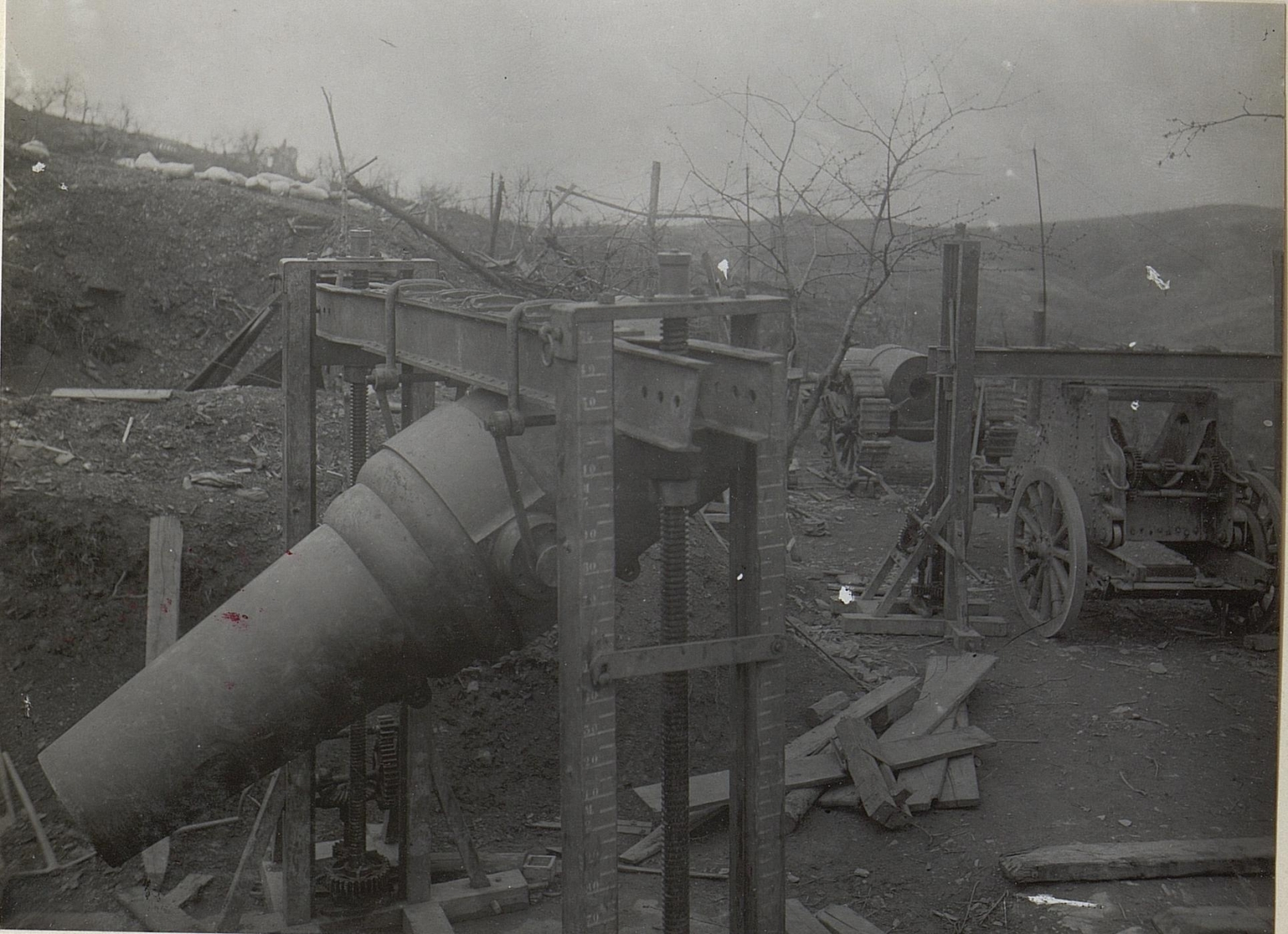
A Obice da 280 being assembled in the field.

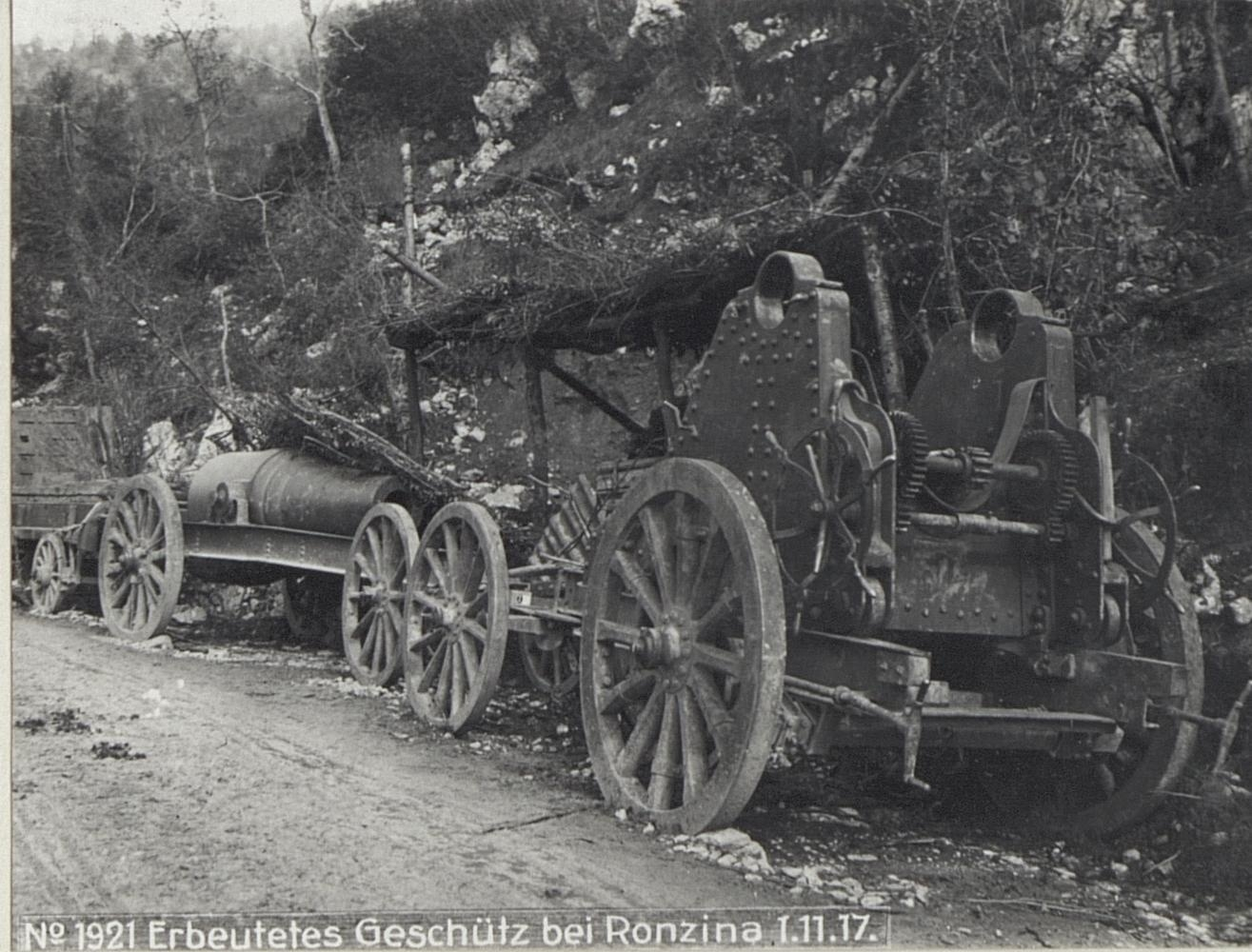
A Obice da 280 abandoned during the Italian retreat from Caporetto.
