= Artillery of World War I =

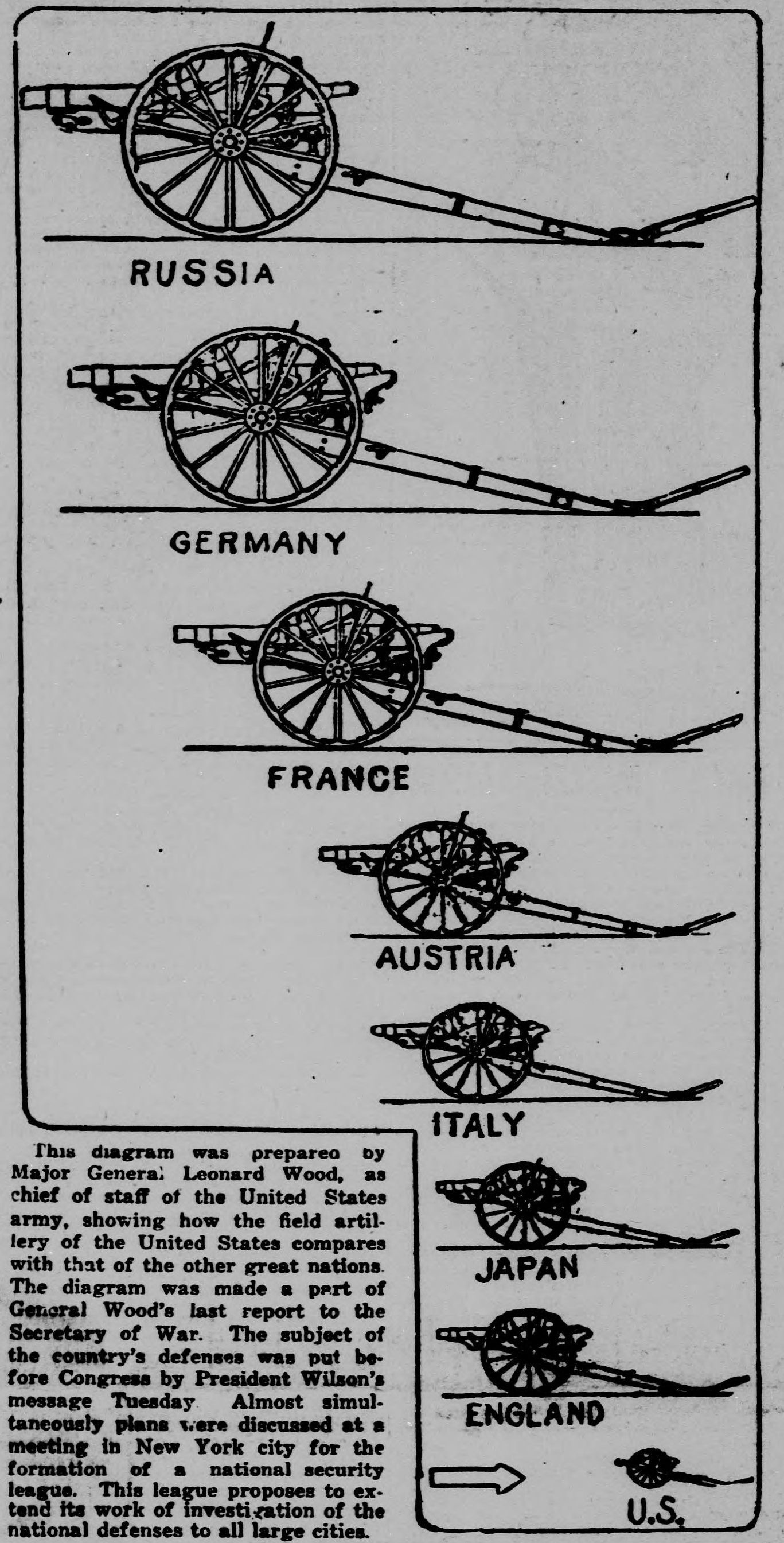
Military Field Artillery Numbers by Country in 1914

The artillery of World War I, improved over that used in previous wars, influenced the tactics, operations, and strategies that were used by the belligerents. This led to trench warfare and encouraged efforts to break the resulting stalemate at the front. World War I raised artillery to a new level of importance on the battlefield. Artillery was seen as dominating World War 1. We see how artillery dominated World War 1 through "the photographs, memoirs, poetry and prose and how they show the different effects of shellfire".

The First World War saw many developments in artillery warfare. Artillery could now fire the new high explosive shells, and throw them farther and at a higher rate of fire. During this time the Western Front is known for having fire without movement. This meant that enemies in trenches were no longer always safe, and could constantly be fired upon. In some areas, artillery concentration was common, with several guns firing onto an area such as a line of trenches, each gun firing several rounds per minute for hours. Artillery barrages were also used to divert the enemy's attention from the site of attack before a battle. Paths behind the lines were also fired upon so that enemy reinforcements could not safely reach the front lines.

Mortars were revived by the Germans because of their ability to shoot at an angle above 45 degrees, and therefore could theoretically (although not often) drop shells directly into an enemy trench before exploding, increasing lethality. Artillery shells were used for chemical weapon emission by the German troops in 1915, and the Allies followed their example after the Second Battle of Ypres.

== Strategy ==
Artillery is generally split into two categories: light artillery and heavy artillery. Light artillery, commonly known as field artillery, is designed to be lightweight and easy to transport on the battlefield. The need for light weight limited the size of the shells and the damage they could inflict on the enemy. Heavy artillery is difficult to transport and typically used in fixed positions during siege warfare. Heavy artillery typically requires specialized troops and transport infrastructure.

The belligerents were not prepared for the nature of World War I. Military doctrine before the war, particularly for the Germans, focused on aggressive attacks on the enemy, based on Germany's experience in the Franco-Prussian War of 1870–1871. This doctrine failed to account for the numerous new technologies that defined World War I, including machine guns, wire obstacles and the greatly improved artillery. These changes made the war primarily a defensive art, and also resulted in artillery being the greatest cause of casualties, unlike previous wars. Early in the war, the Germans attempted several attacks without adequate artillery support, with disastrous results.

Before the war, light artillery was becoming more common among the world's militaries. However, the development of trench warfare and the resulting stalemates increased the importance of heavy artillery. While the light artillery remained in use, it was supplemented by heavy artillery installed in fixed positions. Because of the need for heavy artillery, many older guns from the 19th century were used. While these guns lacked the capabilities of newer artillery, they could still fire large shells over long distances.

Several new methods and tactics for artillery were developed during the war, including:

- Box barrage
- Chinese barrage
- Clock method of calling fall of shot
- Creeping barrage
- Artillery sound ranging

While artillery was able to inflict major damage on the enemy, it faced several disadvantages. Throughout the war, forces struggled to locate their targets, and when they did locate them, it was difficult to hit them. Communications between infantry and artillery was also a major problem that was never solved during the course of the war. This meant that the artillery could not adapt its firing to meet the needs of infantry. Finally, artillery was expensive, demanding time and materials of the belligerents.

== Technology ==
Despite the advent of new technologies like aircraft, machine guns, and armored vehicles, artillery was the primary weapon of land warfare in World War I. Artillery was the principal threat to ground troops in the war and was the main reason for the development of trench warfare.

During this time, when better technology started to arise, improved agricultural practices increased food supply and the population, which meant that more farm boys could join the army.

The introduction of the French 75mm was important to note in the design and capabilities of artillery. It was a quick firing gun which increased the rate of fire to as many as 25 rounds per minute, and it was able to fire out 7,500 yards. Before this invention, each time an artillery weapon was fired, the entire gun would be pushed backwards by the force of the shell firing. This meant that the gun had to be re-set into position each time it was fired. Long barrel recoil technology placed the gun within a barrel that included a system to absorb the momentum from firing the gun, allowing the weapon to remain stationary when it was fired. Between the years of 1908 and 1911, French artillery and the whole French army came out with a more intense and aggressive attitude during the war. The artillery they used was being operated by batteries. This shows the increase of technology over time. At first, the gun would have to be reset each time, and then it transitioned into a quick firing gun that could hold more rounds, and then finally it was a gun that used batteries and became more intense then ever before.

The German General Staff had learned from the Russo-Japanese War (1904-1905) the importance of heavy artillery in destroying enemy guns and positions, and advocated the use of heavy artillery in the field army. While heavy artillery is normally not mobile and only suitable for sieges, the Germans were able to develop mobile weapons that were more powerful than traditional light artillery.

Germany also improved mortar technologies. While artillery generally fires in a trajectory closest to the horizontal, mortars fire closer to the vertical. Mortars had largely fallen out of use in the 1800s; however, the Germans saw the potential of mortars while observing the Russo-Japanese War in 1905. By the time the war arrived in 1914, Germany had a stockpile of mortars ready for use. The French and British were caught completely off-guard by the return of mortars. Once they saw these weapons being used by their enemy and proving effective, Britain and France quickly devised and introduced mortars of their own. Mortars were particularly effective in trench warfare since the vertical trajectory of their shells potentially allowed them to fall straight into enemy trenches.

World War I also saw the development of the first anti-aircraft artillery, as well as light mortars that could be carried by infantry troops.

== National forces ==
=== Austria-Hungary ===
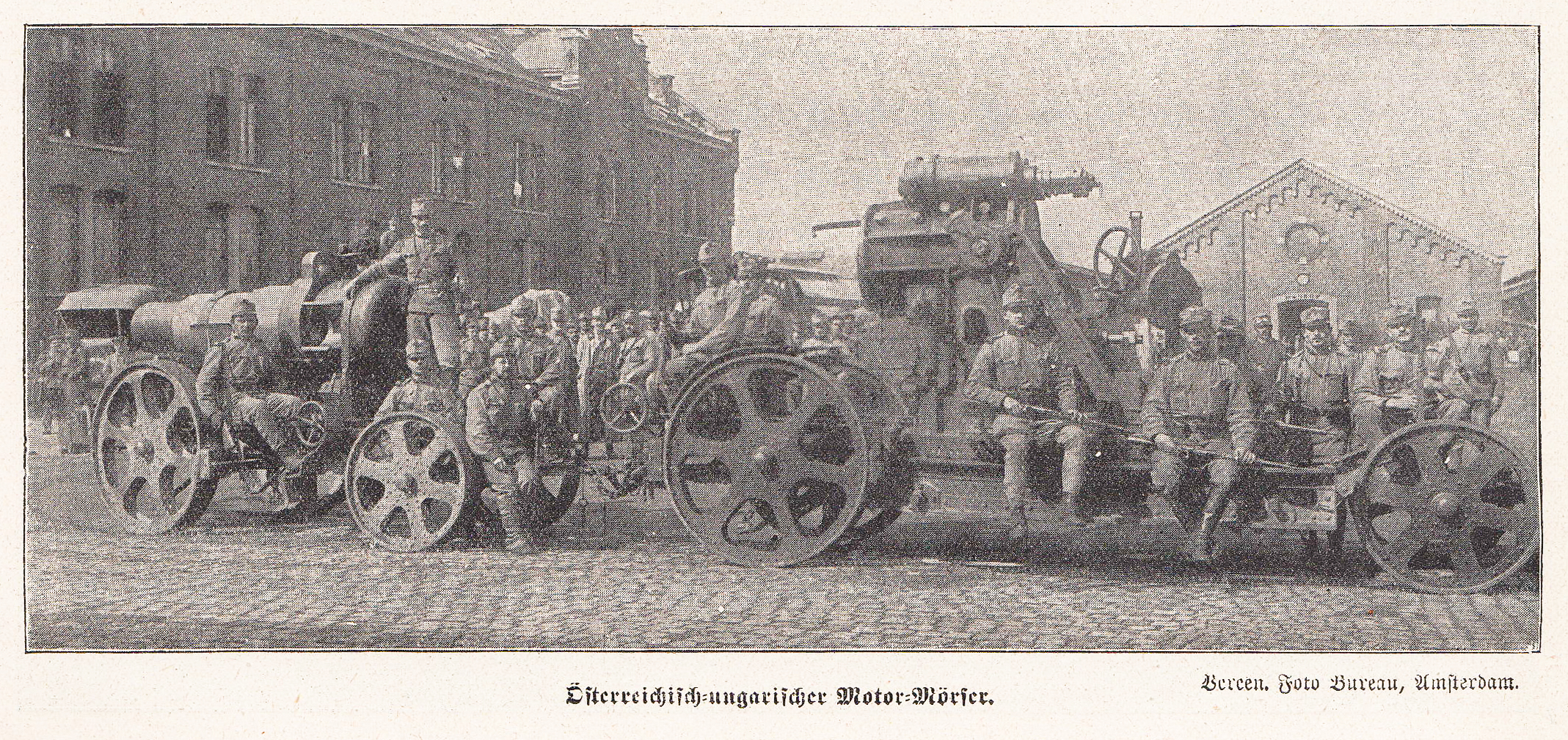
Austro-Hungarian artillery 1914

Among the European powers, in proportion to its national income, Austria-Hungary paid the lowest attention to the development and maintenance of its army. Despite having developed new types of world class modern cannons, the majority of the Austro-Hungarian artillery pieces were from old and very obsolete types. Only Germany and Austria-Hungary developed heavy field artillery before World War I. The armed forces of Austria-Hungary were in decline at the start of the war due to the insufficient finance of the armament. While they had powerful artillery, their technology was often behind their rivals due to the absolute dominance of old types of cannons. They did well at building efficient and mobile artillery, particularly their mountain guns which worked well in mountainous terrain. However, due to a mix of cost-savings and tradition, they failed to adopt technological improvements, such as steel barrels. Austria-Hungary ceased to exist at the end of the war and most of its artillery was seized by the Italians.

=== France ===
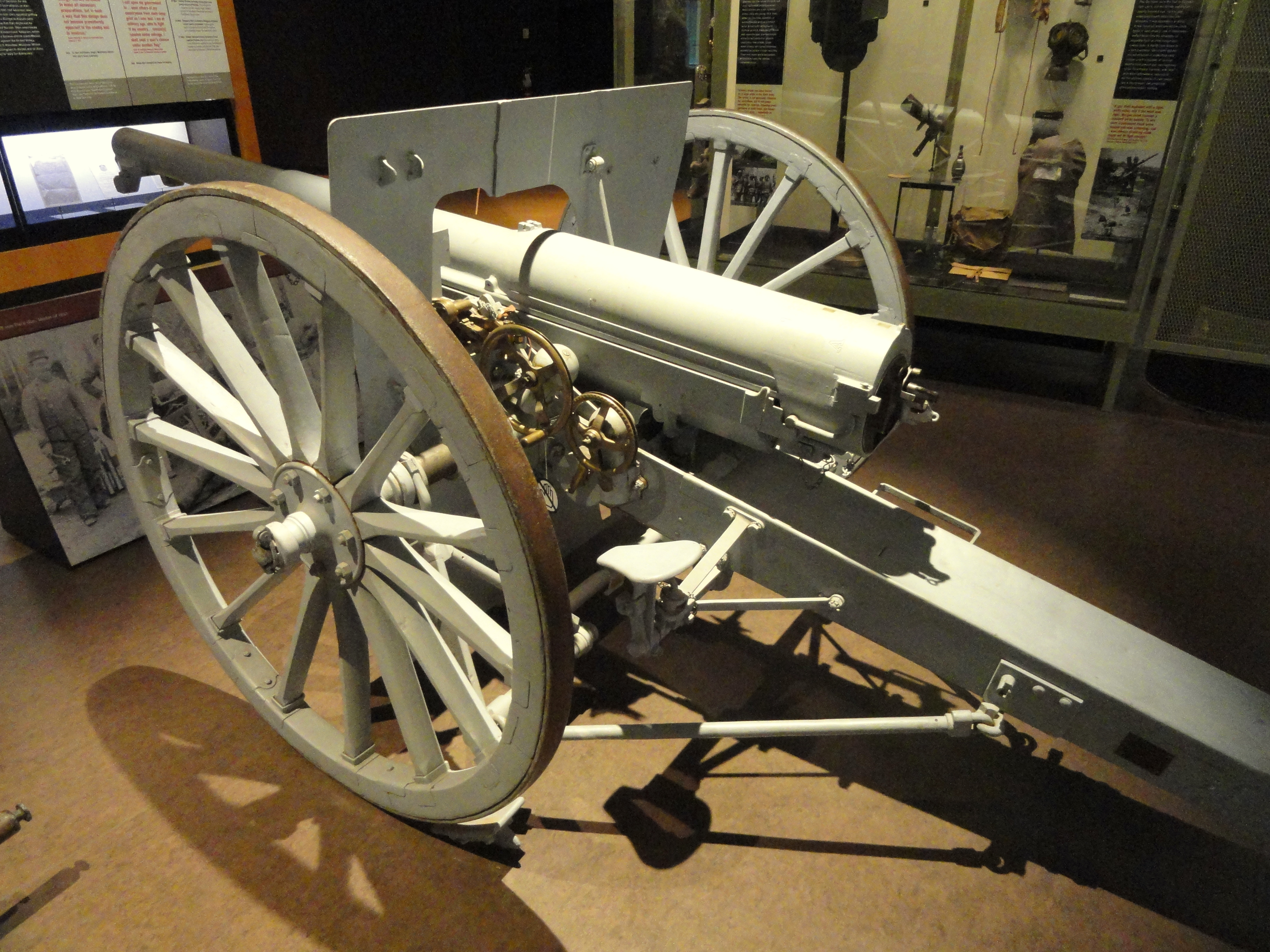
French 75 provided mobility and rapid fire but not enough range for the new war

The long barrel recoil technology incorporated by the French into the 75 mm field gun revolutionized artillery and made previous artillery obsolete. "The introduction of the 75mm M-1897 heralded a revolution in the design and capabilities of artillery. It was a quick firing gun, meaning that as it was fitted with hydraulic recoil mechanism it did not need to be relaid" However, early in the war, the French over-relied on this gun under the assumption that it was the only artillery they needed. The development of trench warfare demonstrated the need for a wider variety of artillery, which mostly entered service in 1916 and 1917. Much of this artillery was kept in service and used against German forces in the Battle of France in 1940 during World War II. France did not develop heavy field artillery prior to World War I. Like the British Army, French forces suffered heavier casualties in trench warfare than their German enemies during the first years of the war due to the lack of heavy artillery in the French Army.

=== Germany ===
The German Empire had the best artillery of all participating countries when the war began in 1914. The Germans had carefully researched previous conflicts and developed state-of-the-art technology that out-performed their rivals. Like all countries, Germany struggled to replace artillery lost in combat, and it was forced to improvise with available materials as the war progressed. Germany was also a country who contributed to "the remarkable changes in the conduct of war." After the war, Germany was forced to destroy most of its artillery under provisions of the Treaty of Versailles of 1919.

=== British Empire ===
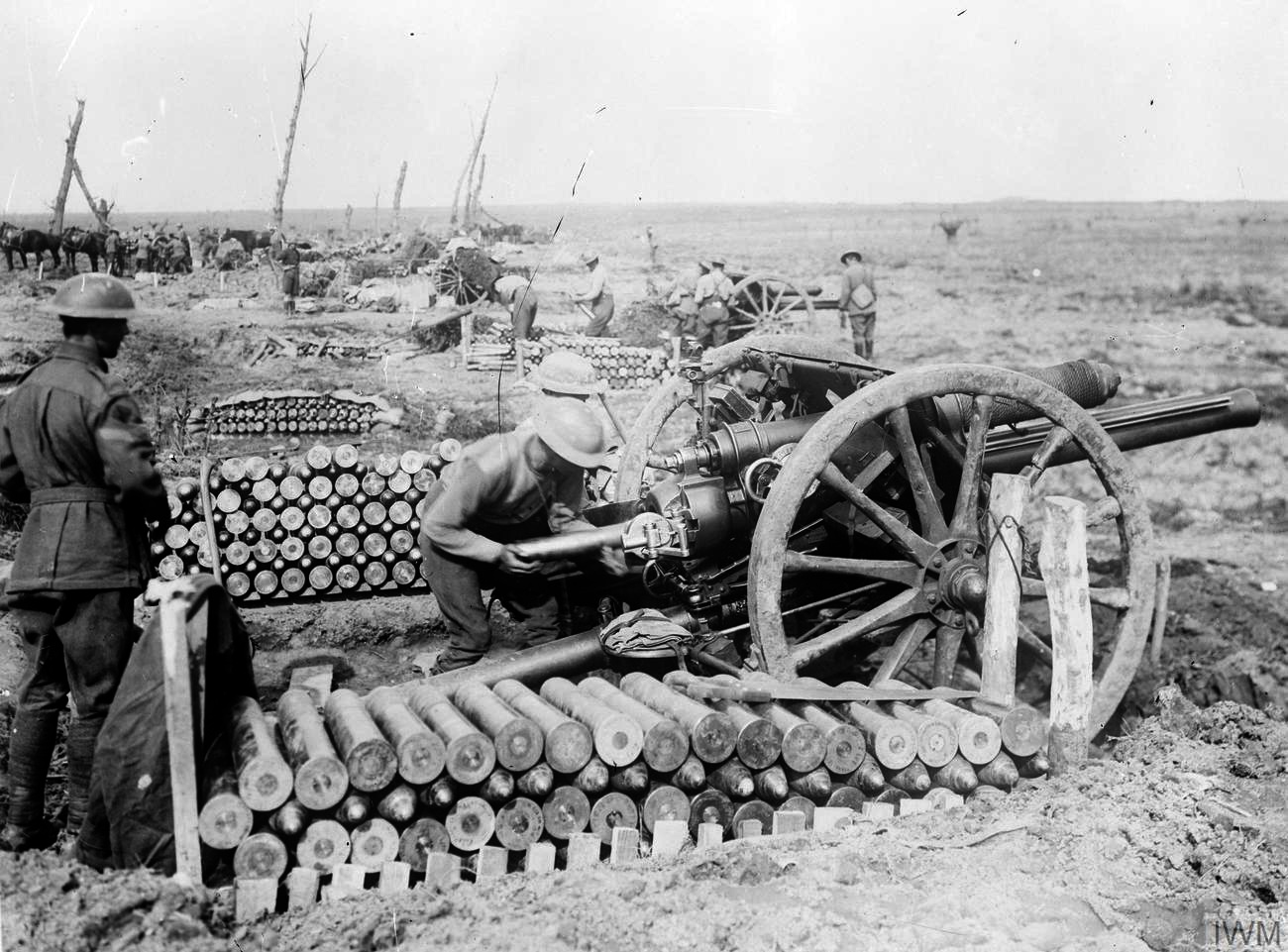
British 18-pounder

The United Kingdom's preparations were largely guided by its experience in the Second Boer War of 1899–1902. The British purchased the field guns that the Boers had used against them, and used these as prototypes for their own weapons. The British also modeled their howitzers after those used by the Boers. Some British designs were used by the United States. The British also supplied guns to Australia and New Zealand. Despite the long tradition of British naval heavy artillery developments, the British Empire did not have heavy field artillery before World War I, which disadvantaged the British infantry in the first years of the war. Although they started out without heavy field artillery, during the years of 1914-1918, warfare dealt with immense change. This included the artillery they were using. There was a new form of war fighting and it was "a combination of artillery and aircraft."

=== Italy ===
The Italians had many types of artillery in WW1, ranging from Italian designs such as the heavy 149/23, 210/8 and 149/35 field artillery and light 65/17 to foreign designs such as the commun French 105 mle 1913 Schneider. The Italians were also the biggest users of self propelled heavy artillery with more than 100 italian Autocannone da 102/35 su SPA 9000 built. The Italians also used artillery that they captured from Austria-Hungary. After the war, the Italians seized most of the Austro-Hungarian weaponry, with some remaining in service during World War II.

=== United States ===
The United States lacked industry that could build artillery and was only able to do so in collaboration with European manufacturers. With the outbreak of the war in 1914, this collaboration came to an end as European manufacturers focused on equipping their home countries. When the United States entered the war in April 1917, it was clear that its artillery would not be sufficient, so the United States mostly used French and British artillery.

== List of artillery weapons ==
=== Allied Powers ===
- 3-inch M1902 field gun
- BL 12-inch railway howitzer
- BL 12-inch howitzer
- BL 60-pounder gun
- BL 9.2-inch howitzer
- Canon de 155 C modèle 1917 Schneider
- Canon de 155 L modèle 1877/14 Schneider
- Canon de 155 mm GPF
- Canon de 75 modèle 1897
- De Bange 90 mm cannon
- Lahitolle 95 mm cannon
- Ordnance QF 18-pounder
- QF 4.7-inch Gun Mk I–IV
- Cannone da 149/23
- Cannone da 149/35
- Cannone da 65/17

=== Central Powers ===
- 10 cm M. 14 Feldhaubitze
- 10.5 cm leFH 16
- 15 cm Kanone 16
- 15 cm Krupp schwere Positionhaubitze Model 1905
- 15 cm sFH 13
- 21 cm Mörser 16
- 25 cm Erdmörser
- 35 cm Marinekanone L/45 M. 16
- 38 cm Belagerungshaubitze M 16
- 42 cm Gamma Mörser
- 42 cm Haubitze M. 14/16
- 7.7 cm FK 16
- 7.7 cm FK 96
- 9 cm Feldkanone M 75/96
- Big Bertha (howitzer)
- Paris Gun
- Skoda 305 mm Model 1911

== See also ==
- Field artillery
- Infantry support guns
- Mortars
- Weapons of World War I

== Bibliography ==
- Clarke, Dale (2004). British Artillery 1914-19 Field Artillery. Oxford: Osprey. ISBN 1-84176-688-7.
- Clarke, Dale (2005). British Artillery 1914-19 Heavy Artillery. Oxford: Osprey. ISBN 978-1-8417-6788-8.
- Clarke, Dale (2014). World War I Battlefield Artillery Tactics. Oxford: Osprey. ISBN 978-1-78200-590-2.
- Hogg, Ian V. (1998). Allied artillery of World War One. Marlborough: Crowood Press. ISBN 1-86126-104-7.
- Ortenburg, Georg (2005). Waffen für Millionenheere (in German). Augsburg: Bechtermünz. ISBN 3-82890-521-8.
- Gudmundsson, Bruce I. (1993). On Artillery. London: Praeger. ISBN 0-27594-673-8.
- Rawling, Bill (1992). Surviving Trench Warfare - Technology and the Canadian Corps, 1914-1918. Toronto: University of Toronto Press.
- Winter, J. M. (1989). The Experience of World War I. Oxford University Press. ISBN 0-19-520776-9.
- Nash, David (1980). Imperial German Army handbook, 1914-1918. Shepperton: Ian Allan. ISBN 0-7110-0968-6.
- Strong, Paul (2013). Artillery in the Great War. Barnsley: Pen & Sword Military. ISBN 978-1-78303-012-5.
