= 24 cm Kanone M. 16 =

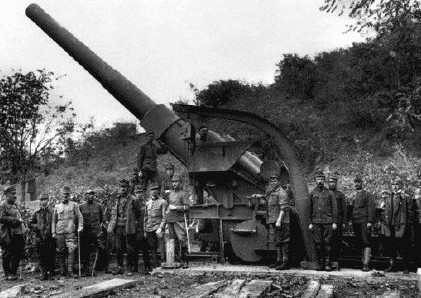
- The crew poses around their gun during World War I
- Type: Super-heavy siege gun
- Place of origin: Austria-Hungary

Service history
- In service: 1916–45
- Used by: Austria-Hungary; Czechoslovakia; Nazi Germany
- Wars: World War I (limited); World War II

Production history
- Designer: Škoda
- Designed: 1915–16
- Manufacturer: Škoda
- Produced: 1916–21
- No. built: 8

Specifications
- Mass: 86,000 kg (190,000 lb)
- Barrel length: 9.6 m (31 ft 6 in) L/40
- Crew: 42
- Shell: separate-loading, cased charge
- Shell weight: 198 kilograms (437 lb)
- Caliber: 240 millimetres (9.4 in)
- Breech: horizontal sliding-block
- Recoil: Hydro-pneumatic
- Carriage: firing platform
- Elevation: +10° to +41° 30'
- Traverse: 360°
- Rate of fire: 1 rpm
- Muzzle velocity: 794 m/s (2,600 ft/s)
- Maximum firing range: 26,300 m (28,800 yd)
- Filling weight: 19.5 kilograms (43 lb)

The 24 cm Kanone M. 16 was a super-heavy siege gun used by Austria-Hungary during World War I and by Nazi Germany during World War II. Only two were finished during World War I, but the other six were completed in the early twenties and served with the Czechoslovak Army until they were bought by the Germans after the German occupation of Czechoslovakia in 1938. During World War I, one gun served on the Western Front and the other on the Italian Front. During World War II, they saw action in the Battle of France, Operation Barbarossa and the siege of Leningrad.

== Development ==
The Austro-Hungarian Army was very pleased with its large siege howitzers like the 42 cm Haubitze M. 14/16, but they were all short-ranged. The Army asked Škoda to design a gun able to destroy important targets deep in the enemy's rear in 1916. To save time and resources, it was designed in concert with the 38 cm Belagerungshaubitze M 16 and used the same carriage and firing platform as the larger weapon. The gun used the forward trunnion mounts on the carriage, while the howitzer used the rear ones. Some sources claim that the gun was adapted from Škoda's 1901 naval gun of the same calibre and length, but this is wrong because the M. 16 gun weighed almost 8 tonnes (7.9 long tons; 8.8 short tons) less than the older naval gun.

== Description ==
The 40-caliber barrel was constructed of twelve parts, notably the inner tube and various inner and outer jacket pieces. The hydro-pneumatic recoil system was mounted on the cradle above the gun. It used the same horizontal sliding-block breech as the 38 cm Belagerungshaubitze M 16. The gun carriage rested on a base box or bedding platform which measured 6.5 metres (21 ft) long, 5.2 metres (17 ft) wide and 1.4 metres (4.6 ft) high. The base box incorporated a turntable resting on a ball race capable of 360° traverse. At the rear of the turntable was a 2 tonnes (2.0 long tons; 2.2 short tons) tilting crane used to move ammunition from the shell cart to the roller race and to help assemble the roller race and to remove the breech. The roller race was mounted directly behind the gun on four tilting arms. When the gun returned to the prescribed loading angle of 6° the roller race was raised so that it met the rear end of the breech, a shell was placed on roller race by the crane and it was hand-rammed with the shell sliding forward on the rollers. It was followed by a cartridge case containing the propellant. While the gun was being elevated to its firing angles between +10° and +41° 30' the roller race was lowered out of the recoil path of the gun.

The gun was transported in four loads, the barrel, carriage and one for each half of the base box. Each load was carried by an eight-wheeled electric-powered trailer with the electricity provided by an Austro-Daimler Artillery Generator truck (Artillerie-Generatorzugwagen) M. 16, designed by Ferdinand Porsche. The 6-cylinder, 20.32 litres (1,240 cu in) gasoline engine powered two electric generators which fed electric motors in each wheel of the trailer and the rear wheels of the truck. Top speed was 14 kilometres per hour (8.7 mph). The solid rubber tires could be removed and the trucks could tow their trailers on the rails. For longer distances they could be towed by ordinary locomotives. One additional truck towed the ammunition trailer, which carried 28 rounds with their cartridge case as well as the loading crane.

It took eight to twenty hours in soft soil or gravel to excavate the large firing pit required to hold the halves of the base box. Six to eight hours were required to actually assemble the gun itself. Each half of the base box was maneuvered into position on rails that ran along each side of the pit and then it was jacked up off the wagon and the wagon was then removed. Each base box half was jacked down onto wheels that ran on the guide rails and then they were bolted together. The complete base box was pulled over the pit, the wheels removed and it was jacked down into the pit. Three rails were placed on top of the base box to guide the carriage wagon into position and the carriage was jacked up while the wagon was removed and it was then jacked down and bolted to the base box. The barrel wagon was guided into place using the same rails and two block and tackles were attached to the barrel clamp. The crew pulled on the ropes and slid the barrel into the cradle. The last steps were to connect the recoil brakes' pistons to the barrel, fill and test the recoil brake and recuperator, and install the roller race. Disassembly took around six hours.

== History ==
It appears that only two guns were delivered during the war, although nine guns and two spare barrels had been ordered. In the Spring of 1918, they equipped the Third and Fourth Companies, each with one gun, of the 1st Heavy Artillery Regiment. Photographic evidence shows one gun near Dornbirn, Austria on the Italian Front and the other was near Reifenberg, Germany.

Only four more guns were under construction when the war ended. Škoda completed all of these by the end of 1921 as the new Czechoslovak Army decided to buy them. When the Czechs mobilized during the Munich Crisis, the guns formed the Fifth and Sixth Batteries of the Third Battalion of Artillery Regiment 301, each battery with 2 guns, the two remaining guns being held in reserve. Nazi Germany bought all six of these weapons, the spare barrel and all their electric trucks, after the Munich Agreement in January 1939 for a price of over 55 million crowns.

The M. 16 was known as the schwere 24 cm Kanone(t) in German service. They were assigned to the Second Battalion of Artillery Regiment 84, where they formed three two-gun batteries. The battalion did not participate in the Invasion of Poland, but fought on the Somme during the Battle of France. A second reserve barrel was ordered on 31 July 1940 for delivery on 28 February 1942. For the rest of 1940, and until May 1941, the battalion was emplaced on Cap-Gris-Nez in the Pas de Calais to interdict British coastal convoys in the English Channel and to protect German ones. During Operation Barbarossa, the battalion was assigned to Army Group North and fought in the siege of Leningrad, between January and June 1942, part-way through the siege, all six guns had to be returned to Škoda for repair and retubing. This was delayed when barrel Nr. 8 ruptured on 10 December 1942 and a number of roughly-machined barrel ingots in storage since 1918 proved to be substandard. The first two guns to be refitted were shipped to the battalion on 18 July 1943, but the rest were further delayed. The next pair of guns were shipped to the front on 11 January 1945. The battalion remained with Army Group North for the rest of the war until its surrender in the Courland Pocket at the end of the war. By the end of the war all of the guns but two had either been captured or destroyed, with the final two being destroyed to prevent capture on 9 May, 1945.

== Bibliography ==
- Gander, Terry and Chamberlain, Peter. Weapons of the Third Reich: An Encyclopedic Survey of All Small Arms, Artillery and Special Weapons of the German Land Forces 1939-1945. New York: Doubleday, 1979 ISBN 0-385-15090-3
- Ludvigsen, Karl (2014). "Chapter 4: Land Trains and Mortar Movers". Professor Porsche's Wars. Pen & Sword Military. pp. 45–59. ISBN 978-1-52672-679-7.
- Ortner, M. Christian. The Austro-Hungarian Artillery From 1867 to 1918: Technology, Organization, and Tactics. Vienna, Verlag Militaria, 2007 ISBN 978-3-902526-13-7
- Prášil, Michal. Škoda Heavy Guns. Atglen, PA: Schiffer, 1997 ISBN 0-7643-0288-4
