= Austro-Daimler artillery tractors =

Film: Austro-Daimler artillery tractor of the Hungarian Red army in Kassa, 1919 (1080p)

Immediately before World War I, Austro-Daimler constructed several series of the first petrol-engined four-wheel drive artillery tractors. These were some of the first commercially successful vehicles for both the Austro-Daimler company and their designer Ferdinand Porsche.

== Siege mortars ==
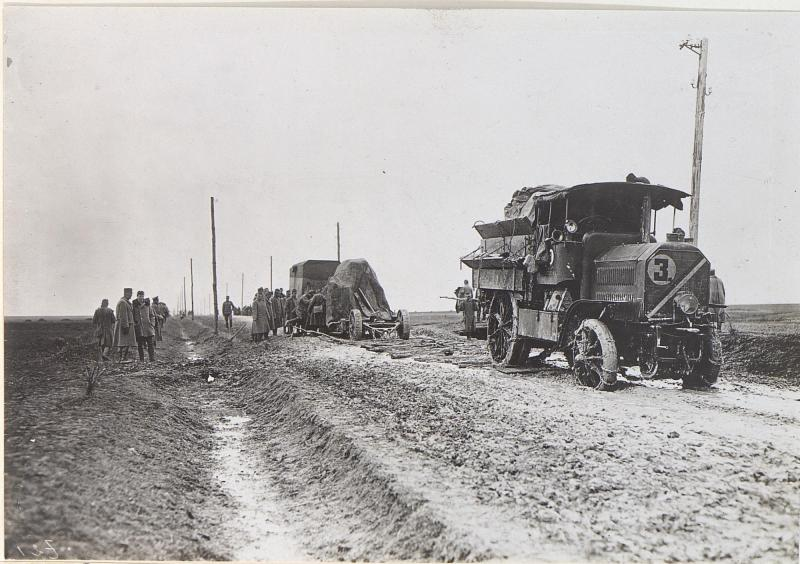
M 12 detached from the trailer of its M11 mortar. Note the tyre chains for grip in the mud and the bench seats for the crew.

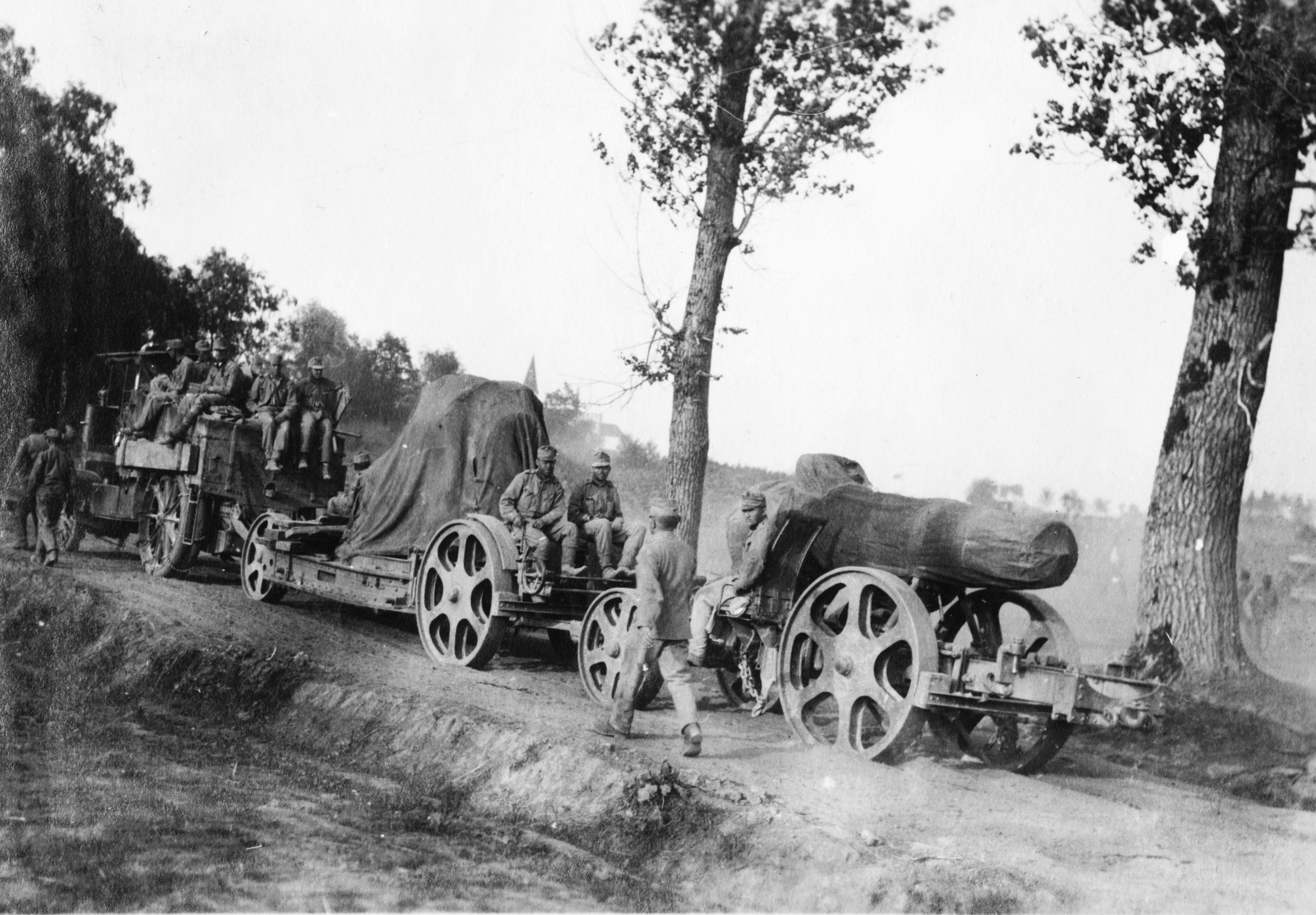
Škoda M11 mortar, split into its two trailer loads, being drawn by an M 12

In the period before World War I, France and Belgium fortified their Eastern borders by constructing a series of large forts, notably around Liège. To counter these forts during a potential invasion, Germany sought large siege artillery, from Krupp.

Although Italy and Austria-Hungary were, with Germany, members of the Triple Alliance, Italy's adherence to this in time of war was doubted. From 1903, the Austro-Hungarian general staff began to plan for the expectation of a war against Italy. This would require improved heavy artillery, and the means to move it in mountainous country. Particular concerns were the forts of Verena, Campolongo and Campomolon.

The army of Austria-Hungary also obtained large siege mortars. These were difficult to transport, even though they could be separated into two loads: barrel and carriage.

== Austro-Daimler ==
Austro-Daimler had previously provided the Lohner–Porsche car for trials with the Austro-Hungarian Army. In 1904, Paul Daimler had produced the first armoured car with a turret. Austro-Daimler's first successful contract to build vehicles for the army was to be a series of artillery tractors to move these mortars. Paul Daimler had returned to Daimler at Stuttgart in 1905 and in 1906 Ferdinand Porsche had been appointed as his successor as the chief engineer at Austro-Daimler in Wiener Neustadt, with Otto Köhler as his design engineer.

== M 06 ==
Captain Robert Wolf (Note: Wolf was soon promoted to Major, eventually to become a General) was the head of Army research and development. He was an advocate of army mechanisation and now sought a tug or artillery tractor for the new heavy siege artillery.

One of Porsche's first projects was the M 06, intended as this artillery tug. It used Paul Daimler's four-wheel drive system from the armoured car chassis, lengthened to a wheelbase of 3,200 millimetres (130 in). Engine power was increased with an 8,500 cc engine of 50 bhp. Drive through the steering joints of the front wheels used the same system as Paul Daimler's armoured car, with a series of bevel gears and vertical shafts within the kingpins. It was also fitted with a drum winch.

The inspector general of artillery, Archduke Leopold Salvator, had his own ideas about mechanical transport. Having a mechanical background, he had already patented his own design of four-wheel drive system. This used a complex central differential and diagonal shafts to each wheel. Škoda constructed a 40 bhp example named 'Lion', (Note: The Austro-Hungarian army developed a tradition of naming military vehicles after animals.) although its four-wheel steering was so heavy that the steering wheel had to be made large enough to allow two men to haul on it.

== M 08 ==
The first large production contract for the military, was the M 08 of 1908. Wolf approached Eduard Fischer, managing director of Austro-Daimler, and his engineer Porsche to provide a dozen tractors for towing large mortars. These were of similar size to and developed from the M 06 design, but with significant improvements. The first of these was a new engine, of twice the power. Although intended as tractor units, they also had a wooden load-carrying body at the rear. This was made deeper than on the M 06, with the top edge sloping downwards to the rear. The overall silhouette of the tractor gave rise to its name of 'Robbe' or Seal.

The engine was Austro-Daimler's own design for an inline-six of 13,854 cc and giving a power of 80 bhp. The cylinders were cast, in typical fashion for the time, as three pairs of non-monobloc cylinders with sidevalves.

Following Robert Wolf's influence, each vehicle was fitted with its own drum winch under the nose, which could be used to climb slopes too steep for the solid rubber tyres to grip on. One of the first batch was also equipped as a recovery vehicle, with a large winch on the rear deck, carrying 1,000 feet of cable.

Although well-received by the military, this whole new type of military vehicle was far from perfected as yet, particularly for its four-wheel drive system and the difficulty of driving it.

== M 09 ==
The M 09 or 'Titan' of 1911 was an evolutionary development of the M 08 and used the same 80 bhp engine.

Around this time, the German Daimler company were no longer investors in the Austro-Daimler company. This pleased the Austro-Hungarian military, who at this time saw Germany as both a potential (and eventual) ally, but also a potential enemy. Investment instead came from the Bohemian Škoda Works in Plzeň, who were Austro-Hungarian and more acceptable to the military. Especially so as they had recently moved their head office to Vienna. Škoda's controlling interest also led to Eduard Fischer's replacement as managing director by Škoda's secretary, Burmann, although the real executive power now became Porsche's alone.

== M 12 ==
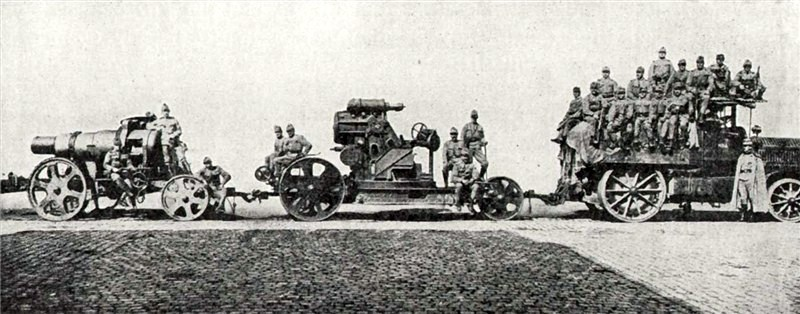
Škoda M 11 30.5cm siege mortar, with M 12 tractor carrying the crew

The Austro-Hungarian Army increased its artillery with an even heavier mortar, the Škoda M 11 30.5cm siege mortar, intended for use against the Italian fortifications. Development of this piece began in 1906 and two dozen of them were ordered by the end of 1911. In March 1912, Austro-Daimler began work on a more powerful artillery tractor for them and the first tractors were completed by the end of the year. A rapid start was possible because the Army was in such a rush for them that it used a 'slush fund' to pay for them, rather than waiting for a formal tender and budget allocation process.

This new M 12 tractor was nicknamed the 'Hundred', after its 100 hp engine of 20,300 cc. Another inline-six, this had twin spark ignition and twin updraught carburettors. The chassis and drivetrain were similar to the M 09 and used the same system of bevel shafts in the kingpins. The centre differential was lockable. Weight had increased to 8,000 kilograms (18,000 lb) and required new ten-spoke cast wheels, rather than the previous eight-spoke. The rear wheels were larger than the front, at 1.5 metres (59 in), and also had double tyres fitted, although these were still of a treadless solid rubber pattern. Each tractor was now capable of towing between 30 and 36 tons, depending on road conditions. The wooden side boards of the tractor body folded down to make rows of lengthwise bench seats to carry the mortar crew.

Eight mortar batteries were formed, with two apiece, and each mortar train potentially requiring three tractors. Forty 'Hundreds' were supplied for this, rather than the full forty eight, as some of the mortars were used defensively, or were expected to be moved by rail.

=== War service ===
Although intended for use by the Austro-Hungarian Army, against Italian fortifications, their first use came on the Western Front in a historically decisive campaign at the start of World War I. Germany planned to invade France by passing through the neutral country of Belgium, in order to attack France's less defended Northern flank. This involved assaulting the Belgian forts, particularly Liège and its ring of forts, which began on the 6 August 1914 with a rapid assault, repulsed by the Belgians, and which then developed into a protracted siege. This was what the forts had been designed to withstand and they were expected to hold out for at least a month, allowing time for a counterattack to be mounted.

This early in the war, only the two prototypes of the German Krupp 420 mm (17 in) mortar had been completed. To defeat Liège. Germany called upon its Austro-Hungarian ally for support. Eight of the Škoda 305mm mortars, with their tractors, were deployed but the Liège forts surrendered by the 16 August, before they had arrived. (Note: There is some question as to the deployment of the Škoda mortars. Ludwigsen describes them as having been used at Liège.)

The process was repeated at Namur, from 21 to 23 August. The Austro-Hungarian mortars arrived by rail on the 20 August, spent two days driving the 50 kilometres (31 mi) to their positions, and went into action on 22 August. German experience and the Austro-Hungarian mortars made their siege against similar forts even quicker. After a further drive of 60 kilometres (37 mi) they arrived at Maubeuge on 29 August and that fort surrendered on 8 September.

=== M 12/14, M 12/15, M 12/16 ===
The M 12 continued to be built after the first batch. By 1915 developed versions, the M 12/14 and M 12/15, had been produced. In 1916 the 13 1/4 ton M 12/16 was built as a cable-drum carrier.

This increasing weight highlighted a drawback to the wheels and their plain rubber tyres. The Hungarian importer of the fully-tracked Holt tractor, Dr Leo Steiner, arranged a test in May 1914. An early M12 was driven 500 feet across 'semi-swamp' terrain before becoming bogged down, whilst the Holt managed to cross the whole 750 feet width of it.

== M 17 ==
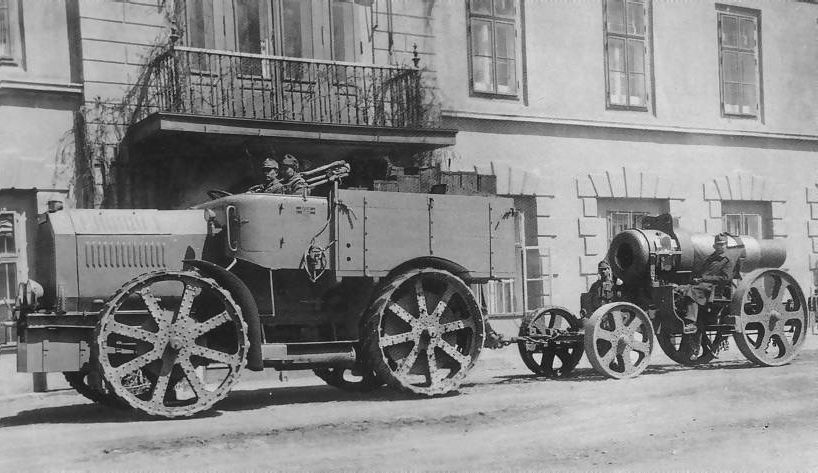
M 17 'Goliath' with Škoda M 11 305mm mortar, outside the Austro-Daimler works in 1917

To improve its performance on poor ground, with the trial against the Holt tractor in mind, Porsche developed a new version of the tractor. The M 17 or 'Goliath' had equally-sized wheels front and rear of 1,460 millimetres (57.5 in). These were constructed of riveted steel and had wide cleated rims for grip, rather than rubber tyres, which also saved on rubber, a strategic material. The tractor had a wheelbase of 3 metres (9.8 ft) and a weight of 10 tons. A whole new engine design was produced, an inline-four of 13,500 cc producing 80 bhp @ 800 rpm and with a governed top speed of 1,050 rpm. This had inclined overhead valves, based on Austro-Daimler's aircraft engine work. The bodywork was redesigned, with a steel half-height cab, but the previous fixed roof replaced by folding canvas.

Performance of this tractor was improved enough that the whole mortar train, on its two trailers and ammunition limber, could be hauled by a single tractor. Eleven shells could also be carried in the tractor body.

Large numbers of the M17 were produced throughout the war, for general haulage and as a tractor for the 15cm Autokanone M.15/16, the new designation 'Autokanone' denoting the first artillery piece to be designed from the outset for motorised haulage.

== Sources ==
- Glanfield, John (2013). The Devil's Chariots. Bloomsbury Publishing. ISBN 9781472802675.
- Ludvigsen, Karl (2014). "Chapter 2: Power to the Dual Monarchy". Professor Porsche's Wars. Pen & Sword Military. pp. 16–27. ISBN 978-1-52672-679-7.
- Romanych, Marc; Rupp, Martin (2013). 42cm "Big Bertha" and German Siege Artillery of World War I. Osprey Publishing. ISBN 978-1-78096-017-3.
- Rothenburg, Gunther E. (1976). The Army of Francis Joseph. West Lafayette: Purdue University Press. ISBN 9781557531452.
