= 305 mm howitzer M1915 =

Type 1915 305 mm howitzer
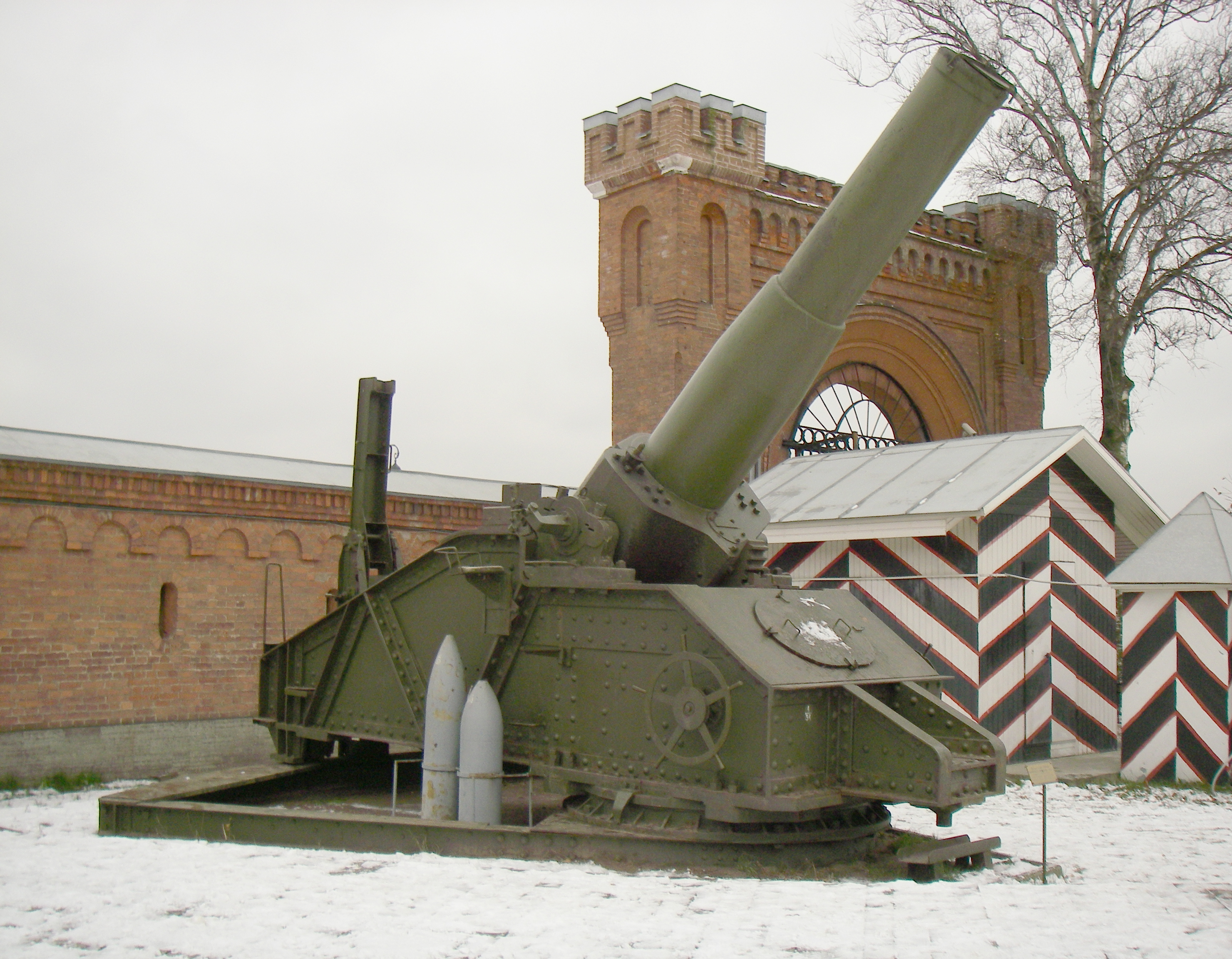
- Type 1915 in Saint Petersburg Artillery Museum.
- Type: Heavy gun
- Place of origin: Russian Empire

Service history
- Used by: Russian Empire; Soviet Union
- Wars: World War I World War II

Specifications
- Mass: 63.9 t (140,874 lbs)
- Caliber: 305 mm (12 in)
- Elevation: 58°
- Traverse: 60°
- Rate of fire: 0.3 rounds per minute
- Muzzle velocity: 442 m/s (1,450 ft/s)
- Maximum firing range: 13.47 km (8.36 mi)

305 mm howitzer Model 1915 (Russian: 305-мм гаубица образца 1915 года) was a Russian heavy howitzer that saw service during World War I and II. Originally intended for Naval use, it was later purchased by the Army at a cost of 271,500 Rubles per piece, with the first order of 8 being sent on 13 August 1915.

== See also ==
- List of siege artillery

=== Weapons of comparable role, performance and era ===
- BL 12 inch Howitzer British equivalent
- Skoda 305 mm Model 1911 Austro-Hungarian equivalent
