= BL 12-inch howitzer =

BL 12-inch howitzer Mk II, IV (Note: Mk II = Mark 2, Mk IV = Mark 4. Britain used Roman numerals to denote Marks (i.e. models) of ordnance until after World War II. Hence this article describes the second and fourth models of British BL 12-inch howizers. Marks I, III and V were the models of the unrelated BL 12-inch railway howitzer.)
- 12-inch howitzer Mk IV manned by Newfoundland troops training in the UK, 1942
- Type: Heavy siege howitzer
- Place of origin: United Kingdom

Service history
- In service: 1916–1945
- Used by: Russian Empire; Soviet Union; United Kingdom
- Wars: World War I World War II

Production history
- Designer: Vickers
- Designed: 1914–1916
- Manufacturer: Vickers
- Unit cost: Russia: 310,000 rubles (1914)
- Produced: 1916–1917
- No. built: Mk II: 14; Mk IV: 43
- Variants: See variants

Specifications
- Mass: 37.5 t (83,000 lb) + 20 t (44,000 lb) of earth in front box
- Length: 23 ft 4 in (7.11 m)
- Barrel length: Howitzer Mk II: Overall: 14 ft 6.5 in (4.432 m); Bore: 13 ft 4 in (4.06 m) L/13.3; Howitzer Mk IV: Overall: 18 ft 6.5 in (5.652 m); Bore: 17 ft 3.6 in (5.273 m) L/17.3
- Width: 12 ft 4 in (3.76 m)
- Height: 8 ft 10 in (2.69 m)
- Shell: See ammunition
- Shell weight: 750 lb (340 kg)
- Calibre: 12 in (304.8 mm)
- Breech: Welin breech block with Smith-Asbury mechanism, percussion fired
- Recoil: Variable hydropneumatic
- Carriage: Siege carriage
- Elevation: +20° to +65°
- Traverse: 30° right & left
- Muzzle velocity: Mk II: 1,261 ft/s (384 m/s); Mk IV: 1,522 ft/s (464 m/s)
- Maximum firing range: Mk II: 11,350 yd (10.378 km); Mk IV: 14,350 yd (13.122 km)

The Ordnance BL 12-inch howitzer was a scaled-up version of the successful BL 9.2-inch siege howitzer.

== History ==
Following the success of their BL 9.2-inch howitzer, Vickers designed an almost identical version scaled up to a calibre of 12 inches, the Mk II entering service on the Western Front in August 1916. Eight complete equipments are reported as arriving in August 1916 and being in action in France shortly afterwards.

It was similar but unrelated to the BL 12-inch railway howitzers Mk I, III and V produced by the Elswick Ordnance Company at the same time. The Mk IV was a more powerful version with longer barrel produced from 1917.

== Service history ==
=== United Kingdom ===
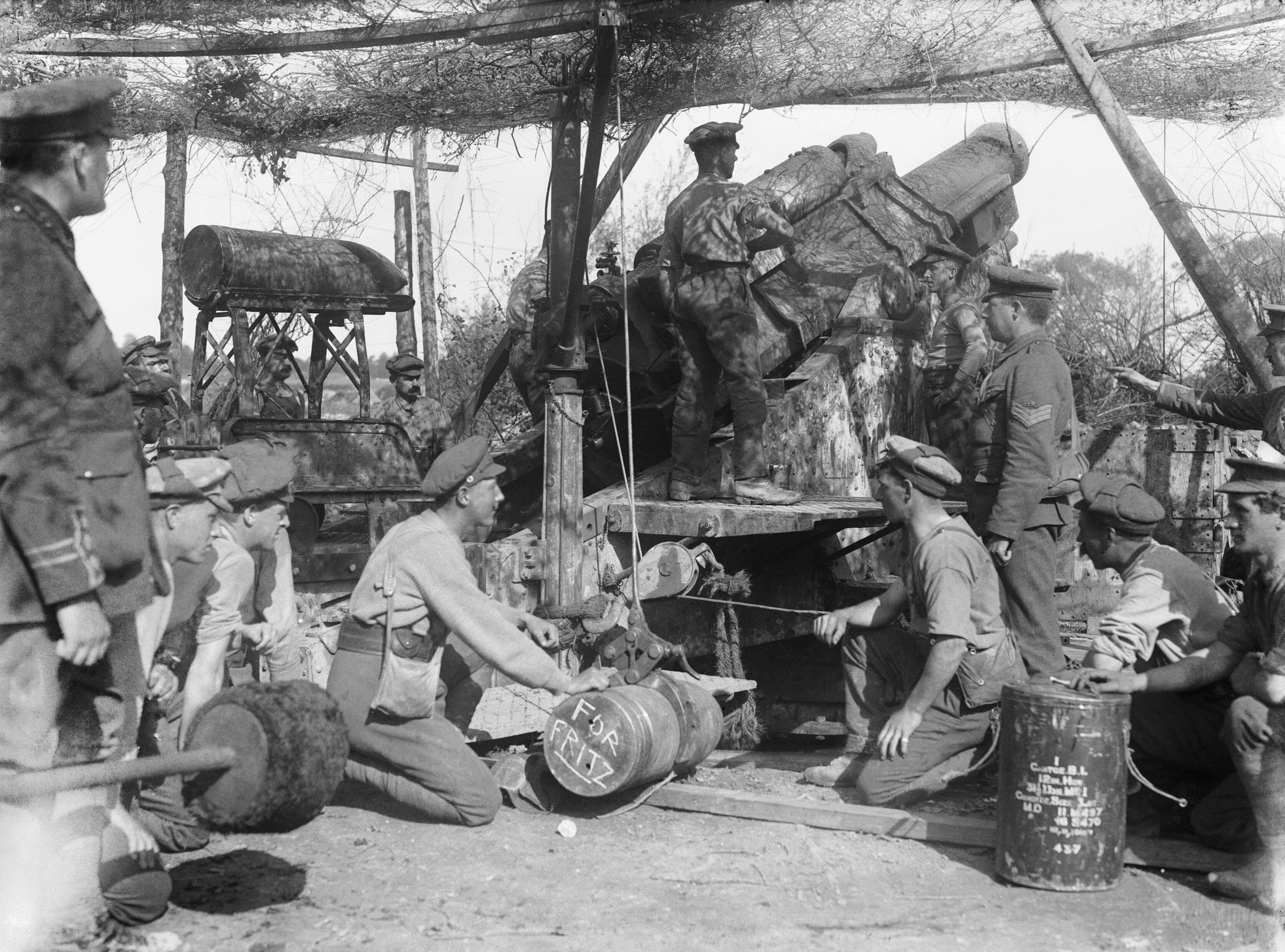
Shell marked "For Fritz" is readied for loading, bombardment of Thiepval September 1916

As with other large-calibre weapons, it was operated by the Royal Garrison Artillery in World War I.

The 12-inch was dismantled and transported in six loads mounted on traction engine wheels, and drawn by traction engines or Holt 75 caterpillar tractors, explaining why troops called it the “12-inch Road Hog”. It was then reassembled on its static siege mounting on top of a steel holdfast, with 22 tons of earth in a box sitting on the front of the holdfast in front of the gun, to counteract the kick of firing.

Guns still remaining in World War II were deployed in 1940 for British home defence in anti-invasion positions. In 1943, a “Siege Train” was proposed and an anti-concrete shell designed. The idea was dropped and the shells never produced. The 12 inch Howitzer was declared obsolete in March 1945.

=== Russian Empire / Soviet Union ===
On October 8, 1914, the Main Artillery Directorate (GAU) signed a contract with Vickers (Deadline of July 1915) for the supply of four 305 mm siege howitzers (310,000 rubles for each howitzer) and 3,200 HE shells (640 rubles each). At the same time, 143 tractors were ordered from England to transport 305 mm and 203 mm howitzers. On December 2, 1914, a new order was placed for 5 howitzers (Deadline of October 1915), and 4,000 HE shells. The total cost of the second order is £147,000.

In 1915, 2 howitzers arrived in Russia from England, and the remaining 7 arriving in 1916. By the spring of 1917, 8 howitzers were included in one battalion of the 202nd Artillery Brigade, forming 4 batteries with the letter "D". The subsequent fate of these howitzers could not be determined.

By 1922, the Red Army or warehouses did not have complete 305-mm Vickers howitzers. In May 1922, three carriages from these howitzers were sent to the Tambov artillery depot. The shells from the howitzers were included in the ammunition load of the 305 mm howitzer Model 1915.

== Variants ==
Gun variant:

- Mk II – Bore of 13.3 calibres
- Mk IV – Bore of 17.3 calibres

Carriage variant:

- Carriage, Siege, Mk I – Similar to the siege carriage of the 9.2-inch howitzer. Designed to be used with the Mk II gun.
- Carriage, Siege, Mk II – The addition of a hydraulic rammer. Designed to be used with the Mk IV gun.

== Ammunition ==
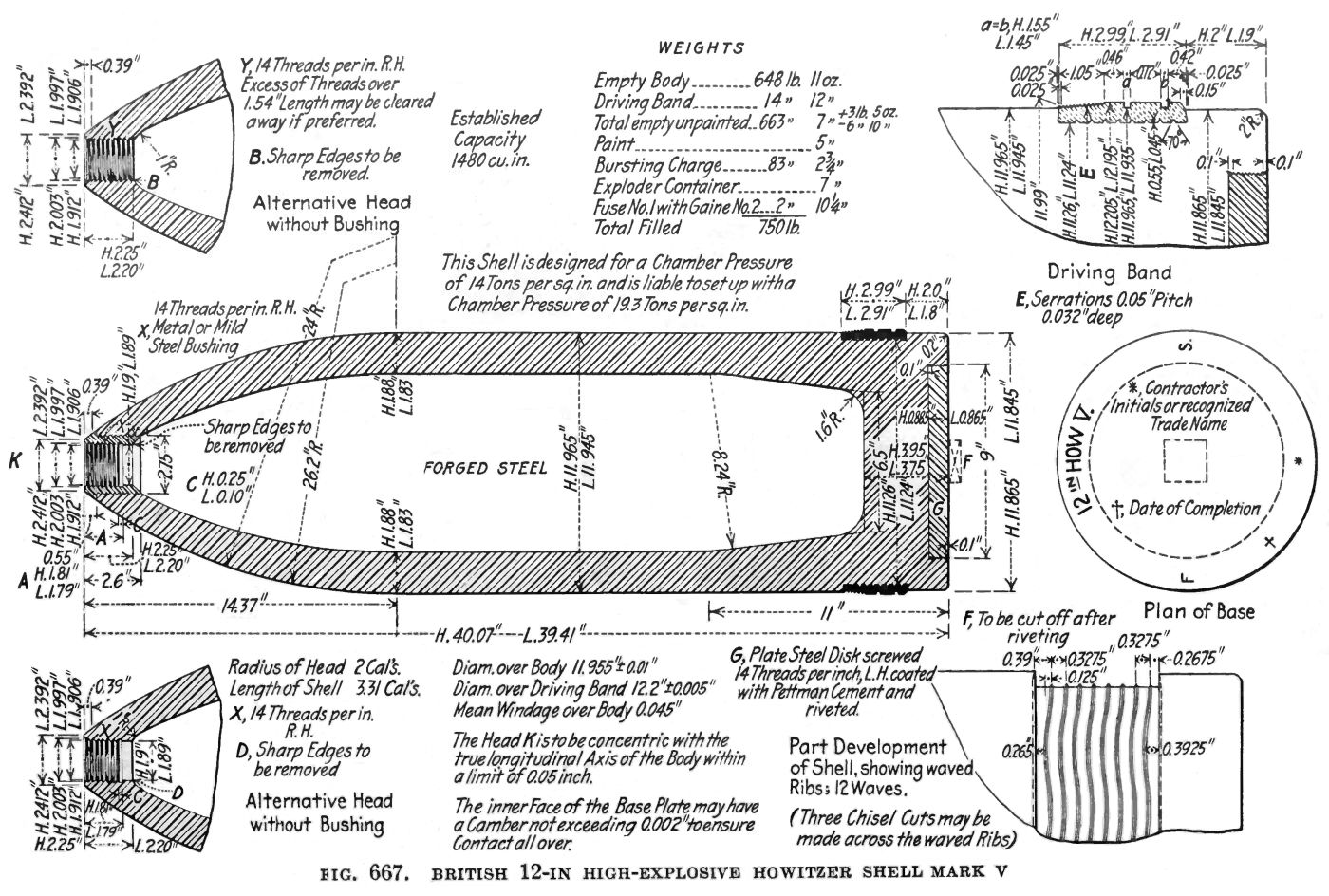
Mk V HE shell, World War I

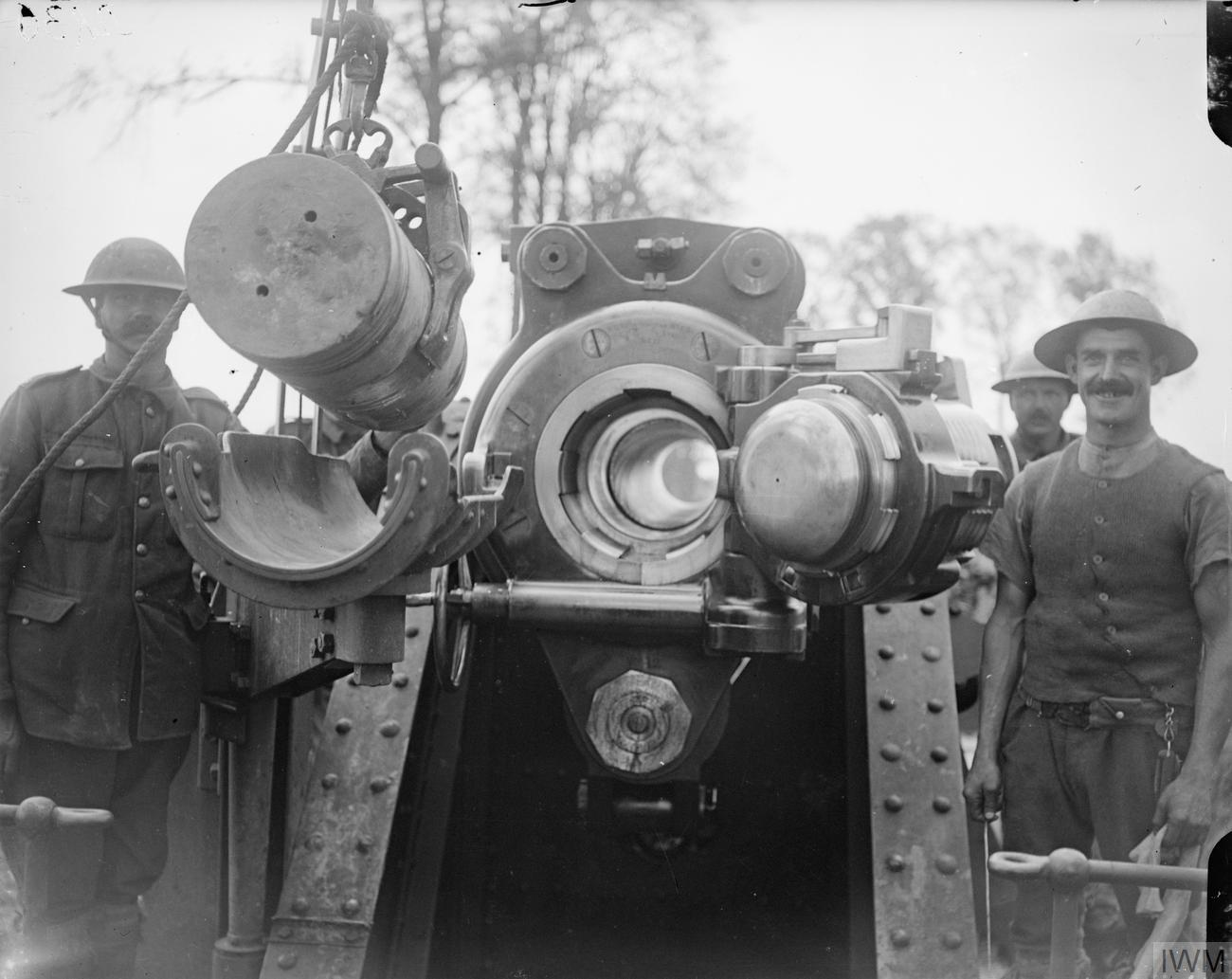
12-inch shell being loaded

== See also ==
- List of siege artillery

=== Weapons of comparable role, performance and era ===
- 305 mm howitzer M1915 — Russian equivalent (and could use the Vickers ammo)
- Skoda 305 mm Model 1911 — Austro-Hungarian equivalent

== Bibliography ==
- Dale Clarke, British Artillery 1914-1919. Heavy Artillery. Osprey Publishing, Oxford UK, 2005 ISBN 978-1-84176-788-8
- I.V. Hogg & L.F. Thurston, British Artillery Weapons & Ammunition 1914-1918. London: Ian Allan, 1972. ISBN 978-0-7110-0381-1
