= 42 cm Haubitze M. 14/16 =

42 cm L/15 Küstenhaubitze M. 14
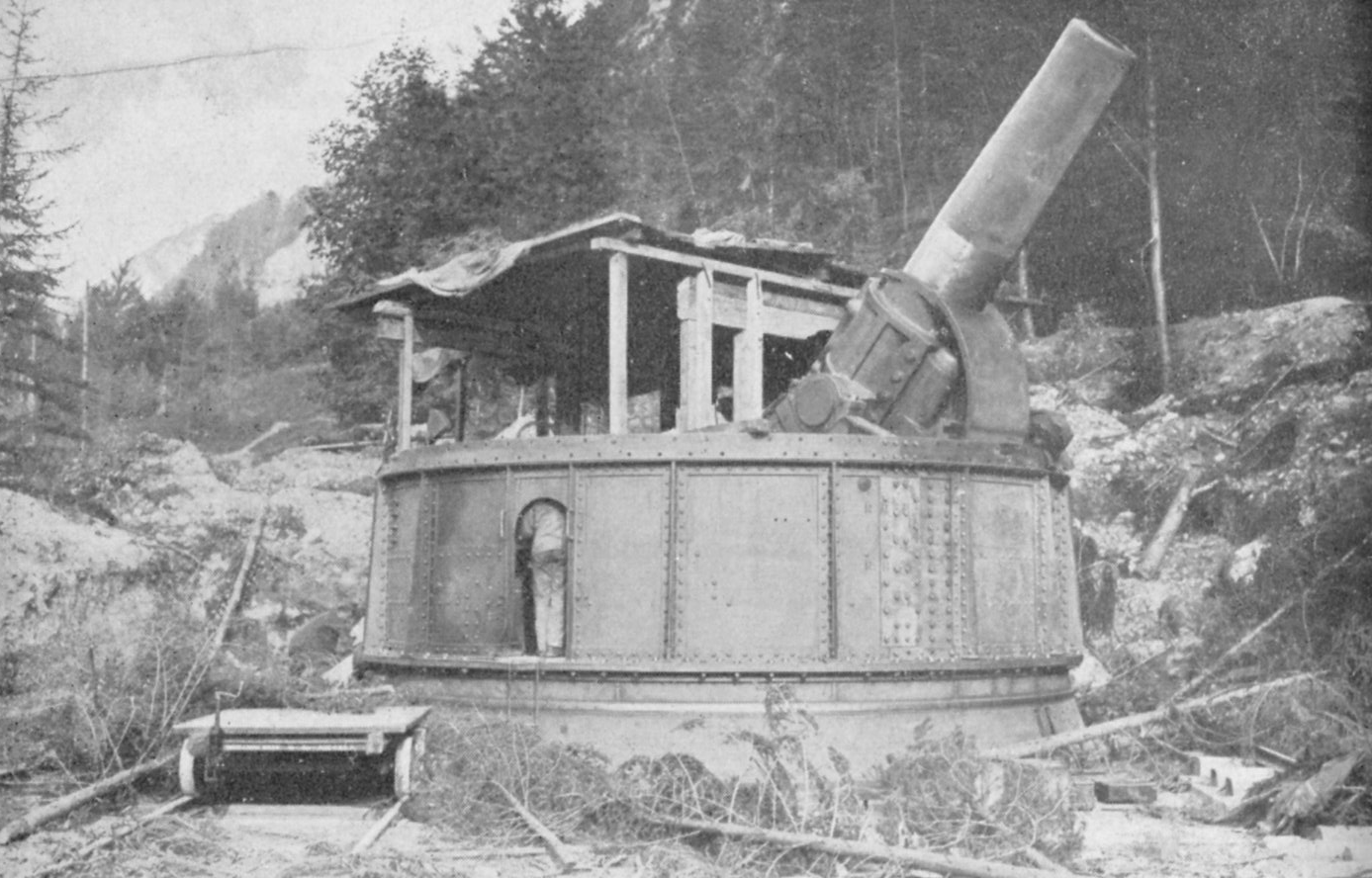
- The 42 cm L/15 Küstenhaubitze M. 14
- Type: Superheavy siege howitzer
- Place of origin: Austria-Hungary

Service history
- In service: 1914–1945
- Used by: Austria-Hungary; Czechoslovakia; Kingdom of Italy; Nazi Germany; Hungary; Romania
- Wars: World War I, World War II

Production history
- Designer: Škoda
- Designed: 1909–1914
- Manufacturer: Škoda
- Produced: 1914–1918
- No. built: 8
- Variants: Autohaubitze M. 16, Autohaubitze M. 17

Specifications (42 cm Autohaubitze M. 17)
- Mass: 105,000 kilograms (231,000 lb)
- Barrel length: 6.29 metres (248 in) L/15
- Crew: 27
- Shell: 1,020 kilograms (2,250 lb)
- Caliber: 420 millimetres (17 in)
- Breech: horizontal sliding-block
- Recoil: Hydro-pneumatic
- Carriage: firing platform
- Elevation: +40° to 70°
- Traverse: 360°
- Rate of fire: 1 round per 5 minutes
- Muzzle velocity: 435 metres per second (1,430 ft/s)
- Maximum firing range: 14,600 metres (16,000 yd)

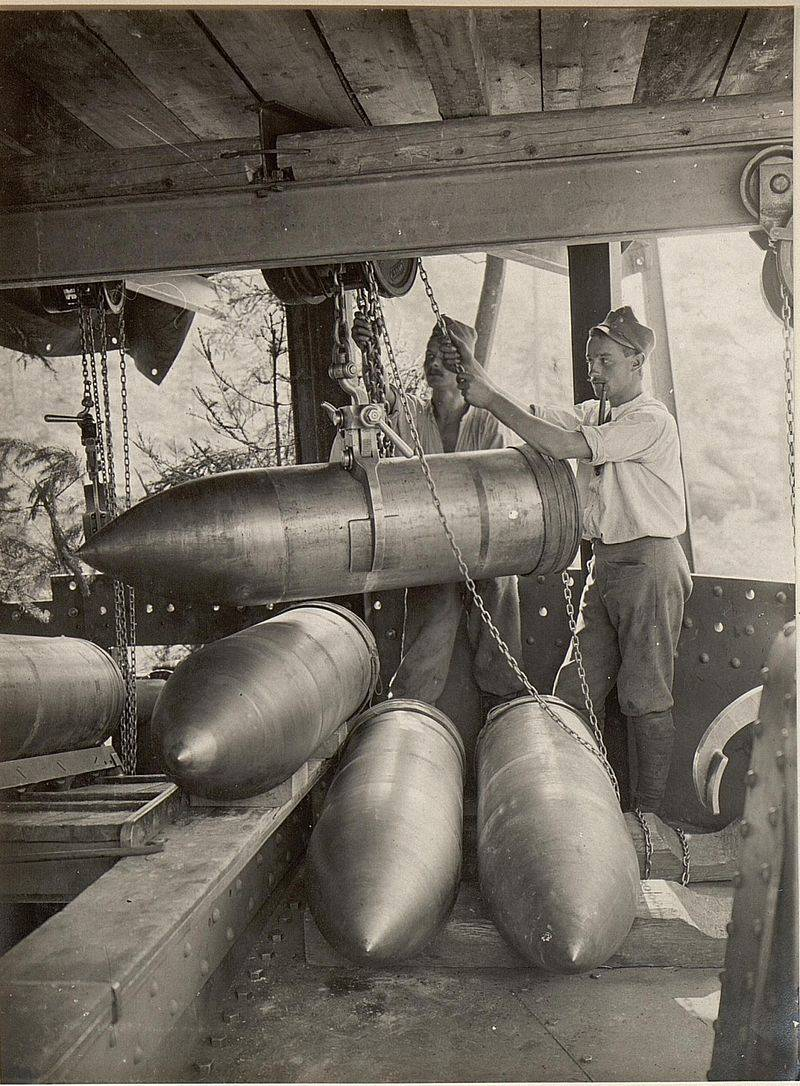
High-explosive shells for the 420 mm howitzer

The 42 cm L/15 Küstenhaubitze M. 14 (42 cm, 15 caliber, Coastal Howitzer Model 14) was a superheavy siege howitzer used by Austria-Hungary during World War I and by Nazi Germany during World War II.

It was designed to penetrate the weakly armored decks of modern dreadnoughts in accord with the prevailing coastal defense doctrine that held it was better to attack the weakest point with high-angle indirect fire than to attempt to challenge their strongly armored sides with exceedingly expensive guns that had to be equally well armored to withstand return fire from the battleship. Howitzers were significantly cheaper and could be hidden behind hills to avoid the expense of armoring them. The known problem of hitting a moving target with indirect fire was to be alleviated by massed fire from multiple weapons all firing with the same data.

Two howitzers were bought to defend the main Austro-Hungarian naval base at Pola on the Adriatic. They were to be installed on a turntable carriage with an armored dome able to traverse a full 360° for all-around defense. The turntable rested on a ball-race ring, set in a concrete foundation. However, with Pola unthreatened after the outbreak of the war, it was decided that they might be better used in support of the Army. The first howitzer was already fixed in place, but the second was not yet installed and Skoda was able to adapt it for mobile use by January 1915. On the 14th of that month, Howitzer No. 2, assigned to Küstenhaubitze Batterie (Coastal Howitzer Battery) no. 1, fired its first shot at the railway station in Tarnów, Austrian Poland.

Eight M. 14s were eventually ordered (along with a spare barrel and cradle), although one was retained by Skoda. Barrel production was very slow, so slow that barrels originally ordered for coastal mounts were put into service as part of the 42 cm Autohaubitze (Motorized Howitzer) M. 16.

One surviving gun was used in 1940 by Nazi Germany to shell the Ouvrage Schoenenbourg from a position near Oberotterbach; the 60- and 80-cm guns later used by the Third Reich (for example at Sevastopol) were not ready in time for the French campaign, so World War I vintage heavy pieces like this Škoda and also a surviving Gamma-Gerät weapon had to be used. The Škoda, apparently the sole M17 model, entered German possession following the annexation of Czechoslovakia in 1938–39, and was renamed from 42 cm houfnice vz. 17 to 42 cm Haubitze(t); it also served at Leningrad and Sevastopol, even though its barrel life was rated to only 1,000 rounds.

Another piece, an M16 model, was captured at Győr in Hungary during the Hungarian–Romanian War of 1919, together with the 38 cm Belagerungshaubitze M 16 no 2 "Gudrun". It is exhibited at the National Military Museum in Bucharest.

== Bibliography ==
- Gander, Terry and Chamberlain, Peter. Weapons of the Third Reich: An Encyclopedic Survey of All Small Arms, Artillery and Special Weapons of the German Land Forces 1939–1945. New York: Doubleday, 1979 ISBN 0-385-15090-3
- Ortner, M. Christian. The Austro-Hungarian Artillery From 1867 to 1918: Technology, Organization, and Tactics. Vienna, Verlag Militaria, 2007 ISBN 978-3-902526-13-7
- Prášil, Michal. Škoda Heavy Guns. Atglen, PA: Schiffer, 1997 ISBN 0-7643-0288-4
