= 25 cm Erdmörser =

The 25 cm Erdmörser (Earth Mortar) was a simple, mostly wooden mortar used for trench warfare fighting by the Imperial German Army in World War I. It consisted of a 25 cm (9.8 in) diameter (according to French sources, German sources state 24 cm (9.4 in), 65 cm (26 in) long wooden tube reinforced with iron wire with a 2.4 m (7 ft 10 in) long wooden slide attached. When in use, the tube end was placed on the ground in the trench with the slide resting on the parapet, giving an approximately 45 degree firing angle. The mortar had a range between 40 and 300 m (130 and 980 ft). Makeshift ammunition was made of sheet metal mine casings (tin cans) filled with amonal and scraps of metal (gears, bolts, nails, etc. One was even found with half a set of dentures) and a wooden bottom. Propellant consisted of a charge between 60 and 300 g (2 and 11 oz) that ignited a fuze by using glow plugs. These mortars weren't standardized, being a field expedient, and were given nicknames such as "barrel cannon" or "jam jar". They were soon supplanted by the Albrecht mortar.
