= 15cm Krupp schwere Positionhaubitze Model 1905 =

1905 artillery piece developed by Krupp

- Place of origin: Germany, Ottoman Empire

Service history
- Used by: Ottoman Empire, Bulgaria
- Wars: First Balkan War, World War I

Production history
- Designer: Krupp
- Manufacturer: Krupp
- Developed from: 15 cm sFH 02
- No. built: 38

Specifications
- Mass: 2290 kg
- Barrel length: 2.1 m barrel
- Caliber: 149.1 mm L/14
- Recoil: 1200 mm
- Elevation: + 43° / - 5°
- Traverse: 5°
- Maximum firing range: 7100 m
- References: https://www.bulgarianartillery.it/Bulgarian%20Artillery%201/Krupp%20150mm%201905_Hb_Turkey.htm

The 15 cm Krupp schwere Positionhaubitze Model 1905 (English: "15 cm Krupp heavy position howitzer Model 1905") was a 150mm artillery piece developed by Krupp and used by the Ottoman Empire in the First Balkan War and World War I.

A development of the 15 cm sFH 02, the 1905 featured a longer L/14 barrel and a gun shield. Krupp's internal designation was "15 cm schwere Positionhaubitze L/14 mit Rohrrucklauf". Since the guns were a bit over the allowed weight for horse-pulled artillery, the 18 pieces completed were sold to the Ottoman Empire and were delivered in 1908, where they were deployed in the defense of Adrianople. The Ottomans also produced 20 artillery pieces under license at the Imperial Arsenal (Top Hâne i Âmire) in Istanbul prior to the end of World War I.

Bulgaria captured 14 of the 18 original guns after the Siege of Adrianople (1912–1913). One gun was captured by the Australian 1st Light Horse Brigade on 16 Oct 1918 at Mafraq and was shipped back to Goulburn, New South Wales in 1921, where it is still on display.
