= Holdfast (artillery) =

Methods used for securing artillery

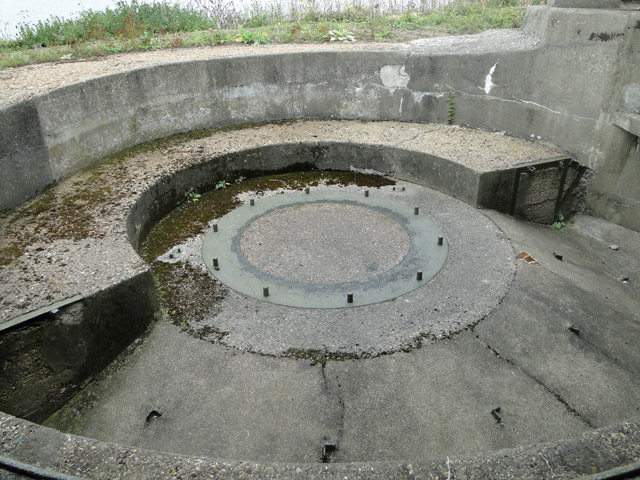
A concrete holdfast with a ring of 10 bolts at Landguard Fort, Felixstowe, England

A holdfast or hold fast is a means by which artillery is fixed firmly to the ground.

One type of holdfast is a concrete base or plinth that a gun is bolted to. These were used, for example, to secure coastal battery guns in pillboxes during World War II.
