= 38 cm Belagerungshaubitze M 16 =

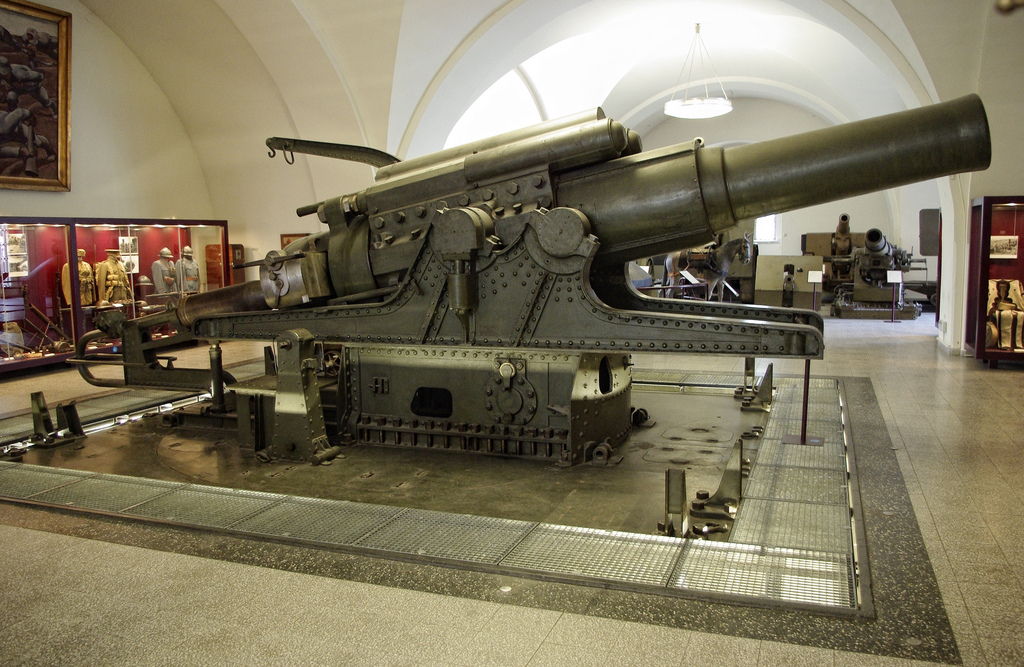
- Škoda 380 mm Model 1916 howitzer, at the Heeresgeschichtliches Museum, Vienna, Austria.
- Type: Superheavy siege howitzer
- Place of origin: Austria-Hungary

Service history
- In service: 1916–1918
- Used by: Austria-Hungary; Kingdom of Italy; Romania
- Wars: World War I

Production history
- Designer: Škoda
- Designed: 1915–1916
- Manufacturer: Škoda
- Produced: 1916–1918
- No. built: 10

Specifications
- Mass: 81,700 kilograms (180,100 lb)
- Barrel length: 6.46 metres (21 ft 2 in) L/17
- Shell: 750 kilograms (1,650 lb)
- Caliber: 380 millimetres (15 in)
- Breech: horizontal sliding-wedge
- Recoil: Hydro-pneumatic
- Carriage: firing platform
- Elevation: 40° to 75°
- Traverse: 360°
- Rate of fire: 1 rd per 5 minutes
- Muzzle velocity: 459 m/s (1,510 ft/s)
- Maximum firing range: 15,000 metres (16,000 yd)

The 38 cm Belagerungshaubitze M 16 (38 centimetres (15 in) Siege Howitzer Model 16) was a super-heavy siege howitzer used by Austria-Hungary during World War I.

== History and design ==
Two howitzers were initially ordered and both 'Barbara' and 'Gudrun', as they were nicknamed, were delivered in time to participate in the South Tyrol offensive of May 1916. They were very successful and the Austro-Hungarians ordered another fourteen howitzers and two spare barrels, although only eight of these were delivered before the end of the war.

The design was based on a scaled-up Škoda 30.5 cm Mörser M. 16 design, which sped things up considerably. The howitzer was transported in four loads, the barrel, mount and one for each half of the firing, or bedding, platform. Each load was carried by an eight-wheeled electric-powered trailer with the electricity provided by a Daimler Artillerie-Generatorzugwagen (Artillery Generator truck) M. 16, designed by Ferdinand Porsche. The 6-cylinder, 150 hp (110 kW), 20.32 liter gasoline engine powered two electric generators which fed electric motors in each wheel of the trailer and the rear wheels of the truck. Top speed was 14 kilometers per hour. The solid rubber tires could be removed and the trucks could tow their trailers on the rails. For longer distances they could be towed by ordinary locomotives.

After the first two guns were made, the following models were built with several improvements. The carriage which was modified to have two pairs of trunnions, allowing the 24 cm Kanone M. 16 to also be used.

== Combat use ==
A 52 cubic meter pit had to be excavated to hold the firing platform which took eight to twenty hours, depending on soil conditions. The bedding halves then were winched into position on rails and jacked down into the pit. The carriage was then mounted on the bedding and the barrel mated to it. All this took six to eight hours to prepare for firing. A small tilting crane was mounted on the left side of the turntable to move shells from their transport carts to the loading tray. It was also used to assemble the loading tray and to change the breech. The howitzer could only be loaded at 11° elevation because the shells had to be rammed by a hand-powered winch with pushrod. The eight later weapons used the same carriage as the 24 cm Kanone M. 16; it had trunnion mounts for both types and the gun used the forward mounts while the howitzer used the rear ones.

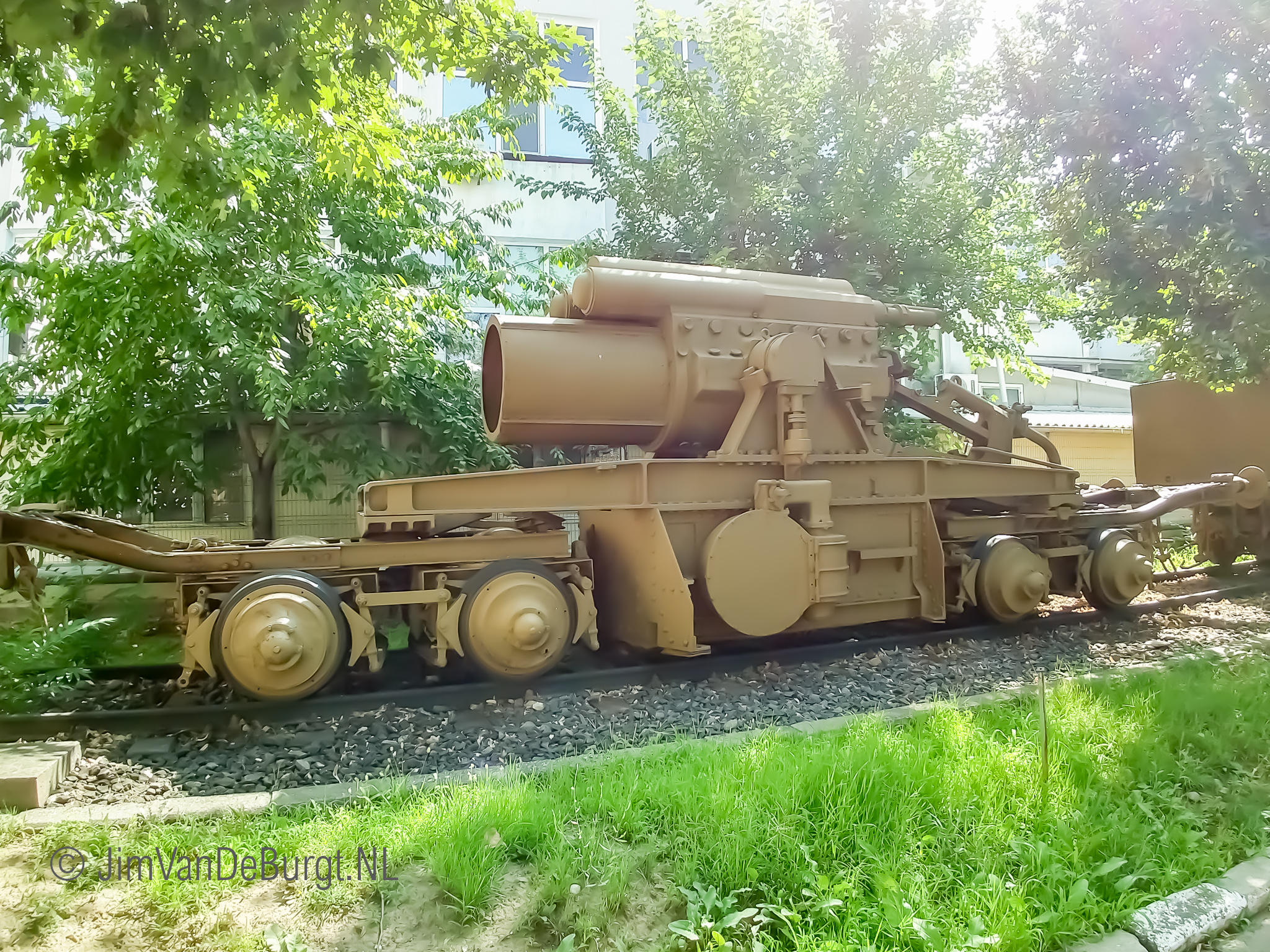
The mount of 'Gudrun' on the rail trailer at the National Military Museum, Romania

Eight guns were handed over to the Italians after the Great War. During the Second World War, five of these were used by the Guardia alla Frontiera but none were ever used in combat. The fate of the other weapons is unclear. None were put into service by the Nazis after the Anschluss, possibly because of a lack of ammunition, and it is not certain that Romania actually used their weapon during World War II. Howitzer No. 6 survives in the Heeresgeschichtliches Museum, Vienna, Austria, while 'Gudrun', Howitzer No. 2 is in Bucharest, in the National Military Museum, Romania.

== See also ==
=== Weapons of comparable role, performance and era ===
- BL 15 inch Howitzer British equivalent

== Bibliography ==
- Christian M. Ortner. The Austro-Hungarian Artillery From 1867 to 1918: Technology, Organization, and Tactics. Vienna, Verlag Militaria, 2007 ISBN 978-3-902526-13-7
- Michal Prášil. Škoda Heavy Guns. Atglen, PA: Schiffer, 1997 ISBN 0-7643-0288-4
- Herbert Gantschacher. Viktor Ullmann - the Skoda 38cm Howitzer in "VIKTOR ULLMANN ZEUGE UND OPFER DER APOKALYPSE - WITNESS AND VICTIM OF THE APOCALYPSE - Testimone e vittima dell'Apocalisse - Prič in žrtev apokalipse - Svědek a oběť apokalypsy" - Complete original authorized edition in German and English language with summaries in Italian, Slovenian and Czech language, ARBOS-Edition ISBN 978-3-9503173-3-6, Arnoldstein-Klagenfurt-Salzburg-Vienna-Prora-Prague 2015.
