= Škoda 305 mm Model 1911 =

WWI Austro-Hungarian siege howitzer

Škoda 30.5 cm Mörser M.11
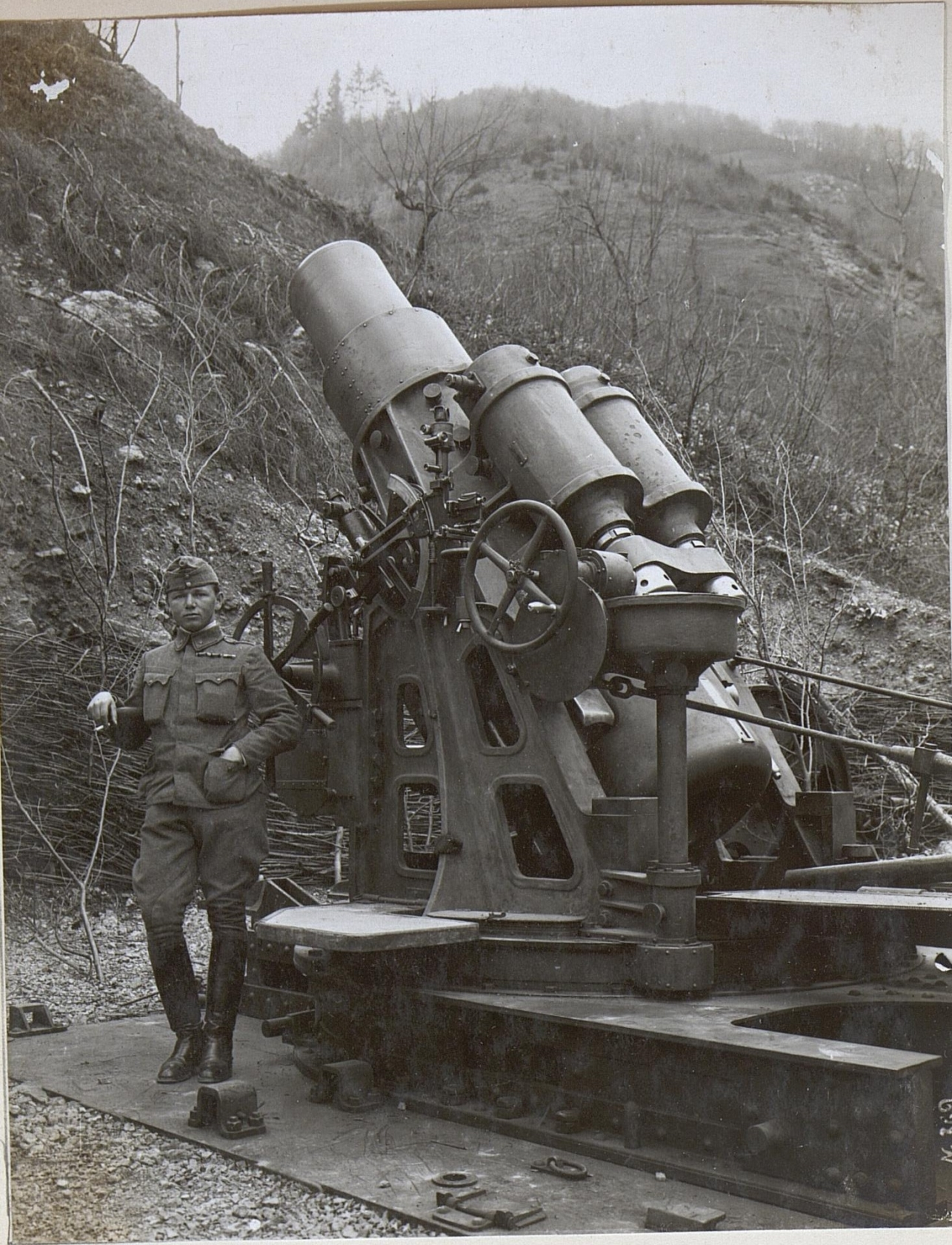
- Škoda 30.5 cm Mörser M.11 in firing position in 1917
- Type: Siege howitzer
- Place of origin: Austria-Hungary

Service history
- In service: 1911–1945
- Used by: Austria-Hungary; Czechoslovakia; German Empire; Nazi Germany; Hungary; Italy; Romania; Yugoslavia
- Wars: World War I World War II

Production history
- Designer: Škoda Works
- Designed: 1906–1911
- Manufacturer: Škoda Works
- Produced: 1911–1918?
- No. built: 79
- Variants: M.11/16, M.16

Specifications (M.11)
- Mass: 20,830 kg (45,922 lb)
- Barrel length: 3.05 m (10 ft) L/10
- Crew: 15–17
- Shell: 287 kg (633 lb) (light); 384 kg (847 lb) (heavy)
- Caliber: 305 mm (12 in)
- Breech: Horizontal sliding-block
- Carriage: Box trail
- Elevation: +40° to 70°
- Traverse: 120°
- Rate of fire: 10–12 rounds/hour
- Muzzle velocity: 340 m/s (1,115 ft/s)
- Effective firing range: 9,600 m (10,500 yd)
- Maximum firing range: 11,300 m (12,400 yd)

The Škoda 30.5 cm Mörser M.11 is a siege howitzer produced by Škoda Works and used by the Austro-Hungarian Army during World War I and by Nazi Germany in World War II.

== Development ==
Development began in 1906, when a development contract was placed by the Austro-Hungarian high command with Škoda Works in Plzeň to develop a weapon capable of penetrating the concrete fortresses being built in Belgium and Italy. Development work continued until 1909, when the first prototype was finished and, in 1910, fired secretly in Hungary.

The weapon was able to penetrate 2 m (6 ft 7 in) of reinforced concrete with its special armour-piercing shell, which weighed 384 kg (847 lb). There were a few technical problems with the first piece, but, after few reconstructions in 1911, the upgraded piece made another round of testing in Felixdorf and in the mountains of Tyrol. After that, Moritz von Auffenberg, the Minister of War, placed an order for 24 of the new weapons.

== Description ==
The weapon was transported in three sections by a 100-horsepower 15 ton Austro-Daimler M 12 artillery tractor. It broke down into barrel, carriage and firing platform loads, each of which had its own trailer. It could be assembled and readied to fire in around 50 minutes.

The mortar could fire two types of shell, a heavy armour-piercing shell with a delayed action fuse weighing 384 kg, and a lighter 287 kg shell fitted with an impact fuze. The light shell was capable of creating a crater 8 meters wide and 8 meters deep, as well as killing exposed infantry up to 400 m (440 yd) away.

The weapon required a crew of 15–17, and could fire 10 to 12 rounds an hour. After firing, it automatically returned to the horizontal loading position.

In 1916, the M.11 design was upgraded and the new M.11/16 was produced - the difference was mainly that the firing platform had been modified to allow for a traverse of 360 degrees. Also in 1916, a new model was released, the M.16, which had longer barrel (L/12) and longer range 12,300 metres (13,500 yd).

== History ==
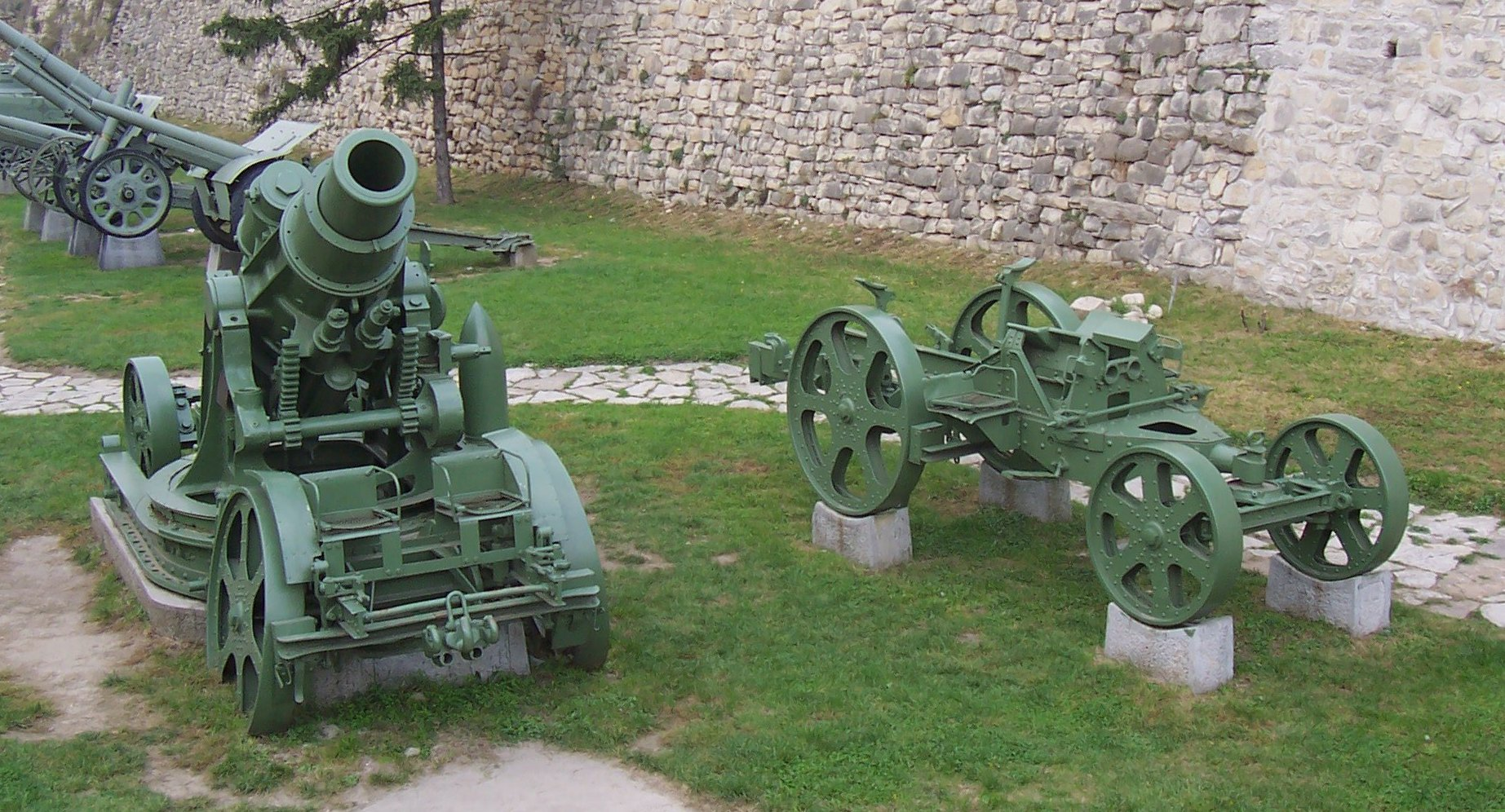
The howitzer with its transport cart; for transport, the barrel would be removed from the body and placed on the cart, at the Belgrade Military Museum, Serbia.

Eight Mörsers were loaned to the German Army and they were first fired in action on the Western Front at the start of World War I. They were used in concert with the Krupp 42 cm howitzer ("Big Bertha") to destroy the rings of Belgian fortresses around Liege (Battle of Liège), Namur (Fortified Position of Namur) and Antwerp (Forts Koningshooikt, Kessel and Broechem). The 305mm was used with great success at Namur, Givet and Maubeuge where it was noted that while the German 42 cm howitzer had the more powerful punch, it was limited to rail transport while the Škoda mortars could be set up elsewhere. While the weapon was used on the Eastern, Italian and Serbian fronts until the end of the war, it was only used on the Western front at the beginning of the war.

In 1915, ten howitzers were used in support of the Austro-Hungarian-German invasion of Serbia under the German General August von Mackensen. One of these is restored in Belgrade Military Museum. By the end of the war, 79 of the weapons of all three types were in service. Only 24 were destroyed.

In the period between the world wars, large numbers of mortars were in service in Yugoslavia (4 M.11 and 6 M.16), Romania, Italy (23 M.11, 16 M.11/16 and 16 M.16), Czechoslovakia (17 M.16) and Hungary (3 M.11 and 2 M.16). There were only two in Austria; one in the Arsenal army museum in Vienna, the second as a training weapon in Innsbruck.

In 1939, Germany seized all 17 pieces from Czechoslovakia and repaired the howitzer from the Arsenal Museum, designating them 30.5 cm Mörser 638(t). In 1941, they obtained five more weapons after the defeat of Yugoslavia and placed them into service as the 30.5 cm Mörser 638(j). They saw service against Poland, France and the Soviet Union in World War II, where they served with Heavy Artillery Battalions (schwere Artillerie-Abteilungen) 624, 641 and 815 as well as two Heavy Static Artillery Batteries (schwere Artillerie-Batterie bodenstandig) 230 and 779.

The 624th, 641st and 815th Battalions took part in the Siege of Sevastopol (1941–42).

It is unclear if the howitzers of the Romanian Army were employed on the Eastern Front and used against the Red Army. At least one M.11 was seized from Yugoslavia and saw coastal defense service in the Adriatic as the 30.5 cm Mörser 639(j). It may have been upgraded somehow, as its Yugoslav designation was the 305 mm M 11/30. The Hungarian Army's five guns served in the 101. and 102. artillery groups from 1938 and were used against the Yugoslavians and the USSR.

Today, four weapons survive; an M.11 is in Rovereto, Italy (Museo Storico Italiano della Guerra), a second is displayed in Belgrade's Military Museum and a third is in Bucharest National Military Museum, Romania, along with the only surviving M.16.

== Gallery ==
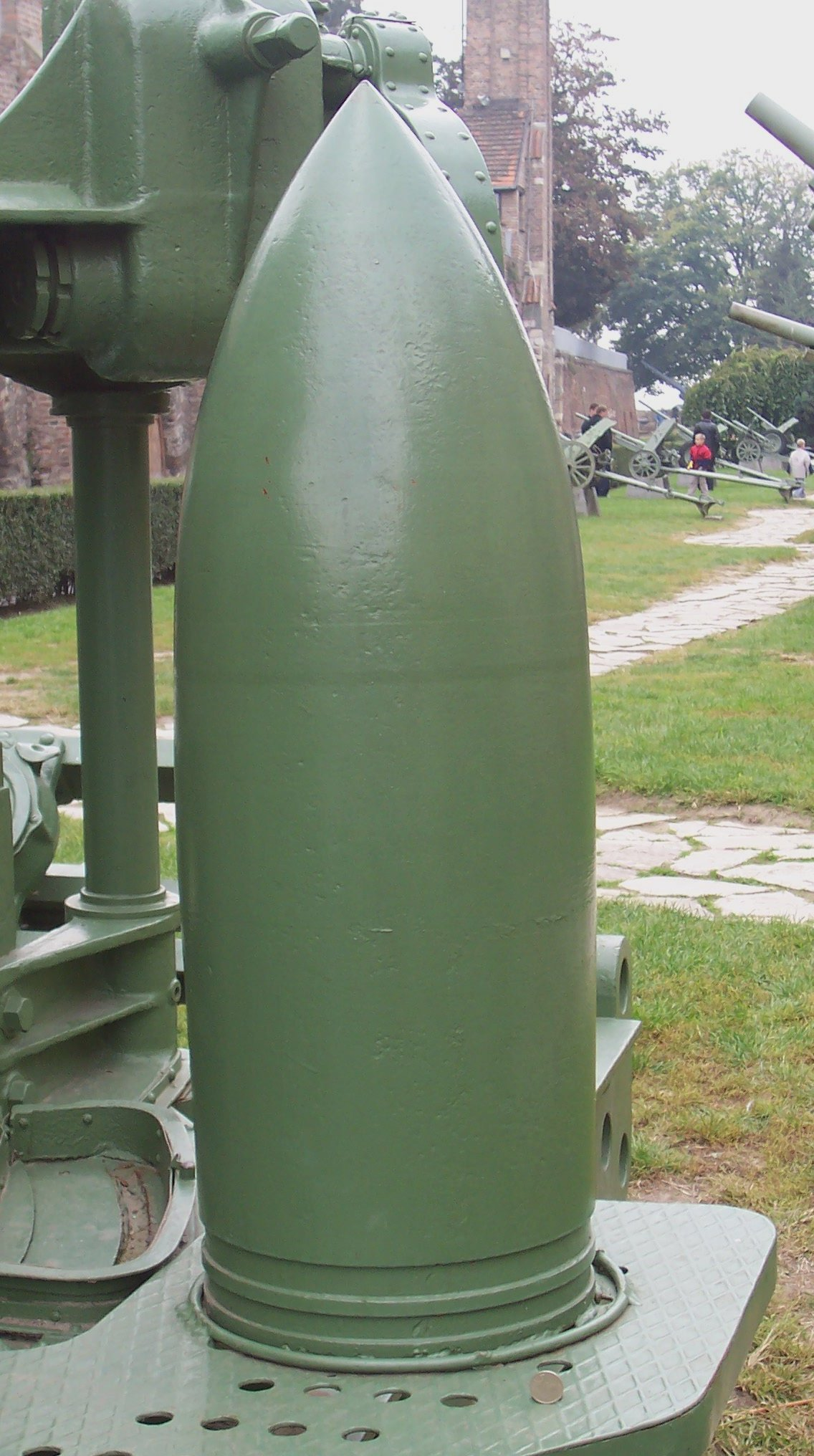
A 30.5 cm shell; the coin (24 mm diameter) near the base is for size comparison

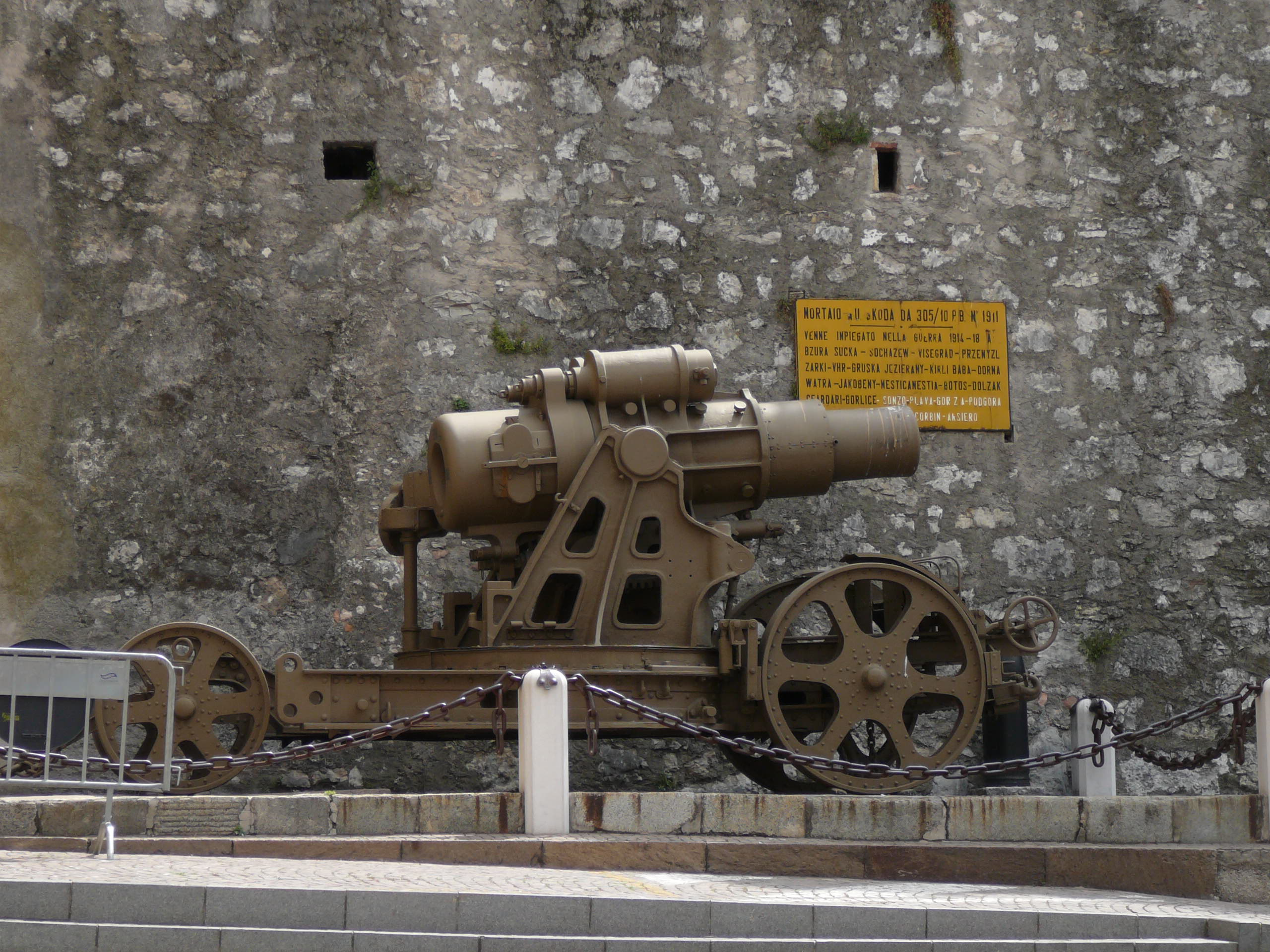
A M.11 at Rovereto, Italy

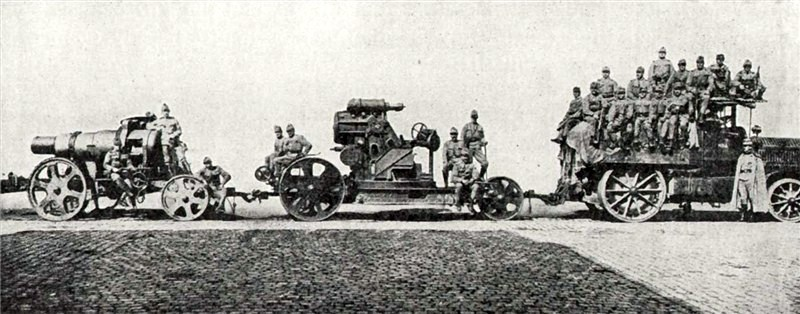
Barrel, body and crew towed by an M 12 tractor, c. 1914

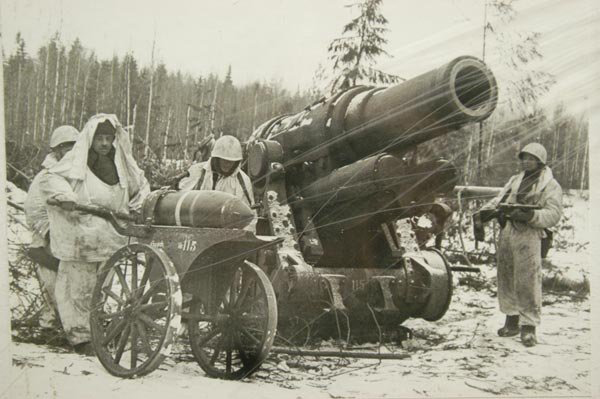
A M.16 captured by Soviet troops that was being used by the Germans during The Siege of Leningrad.

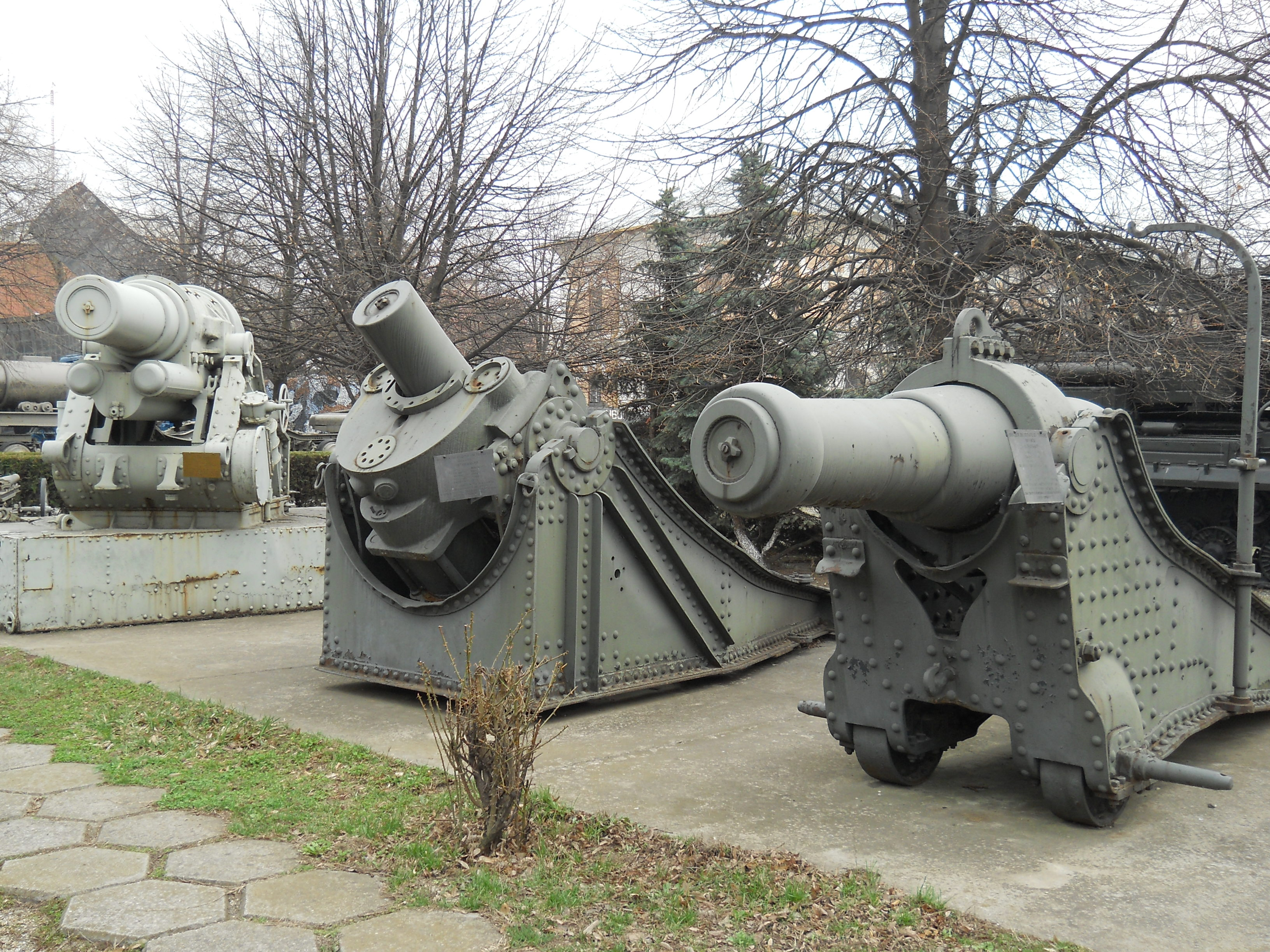
A M.16 far left at the National Military Museum, Bucharest, Romania

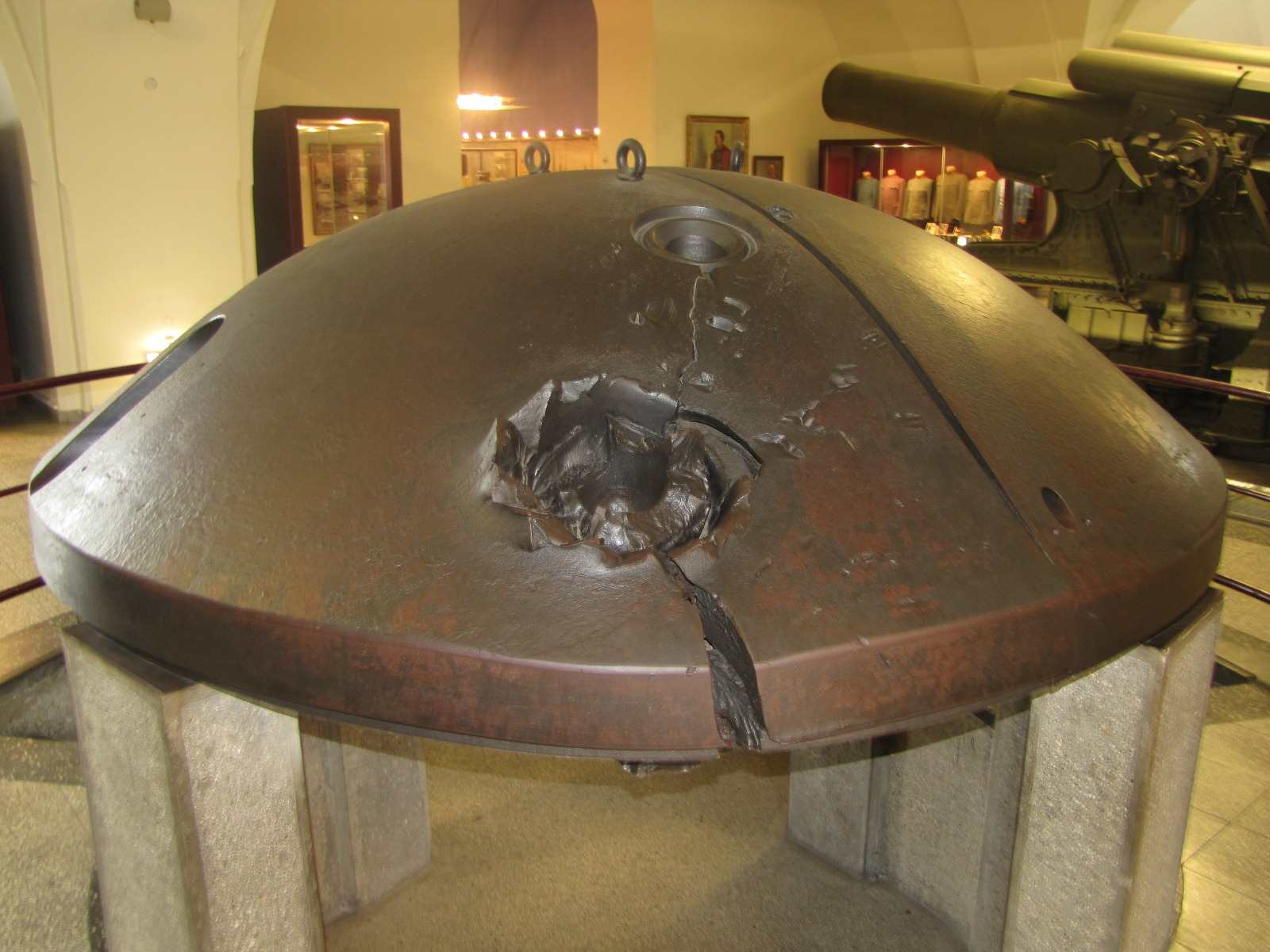
A turret cupola from one of Antwerp's fortresses hit and split by a 30.5 cm shell during the Siege of Antwerp in 1914.

== Weapons of comparable role, performance and era ==
- BL 12 inch Howitzer British equivalent
- 305 mm howitzer M1915 Russian equivalent

== Bibliography ==
- Engelmann, Joachim & Scheibert, Horst (1974). Deutsche Artillerie 1934–1945: Eine Dokumentation in Text, Skizzen und Bildern: Ausrüstung, Gliederung, Ausbildung, Führung, Einsatz. Limburg/Lahn, Germany: C. A. Starke. OCLC 5673937.
- Gander, Terry & Chamberlain, Peter (1979). Weapons of the Third Reich: An Encyclopedic Survey of All Small Arms, Artillery, and Special Weapons of the German Land Forces, 1939–1945. Garden City, New York: Doubleday. ISBN 0-385-15090-3.
- Ortner, M. Christian (2007). The Austro-Hungarian Artillery From 1867 to 1918: Technology, Organization, and Tactics. Vienna: Verlag Militaria. ISBN 978-3-902526-13-7.
- Hogg, Ian V. (1997). German Artillery of World War Two. London: Greenhill Books. ISBN 1-85367-480-X.
- Kovács Vilmos: A Magyar Királyi Honvédség nehéztüzérsége. Haditechnika, 1995, Április-Június. (photos and Hungarian text)
- Romanych, M. & Rupp, M. (2013). 42cm "Big Bertha" and German Siege Artillery of World War I. London: Osprey Publishing. ISBN 978-1-78096-017-3.
- Schirmer, Hermann (1937). Das Gerät der Artillerie vor, in und nach dem Weltkrieg: Das Gerät der schweren Artillerie. Bernard & Graefe. OCLC 29133423.
